= Château Latour-Martillac =

French wine

Coordinates: 44.71156°N 0.53931°W

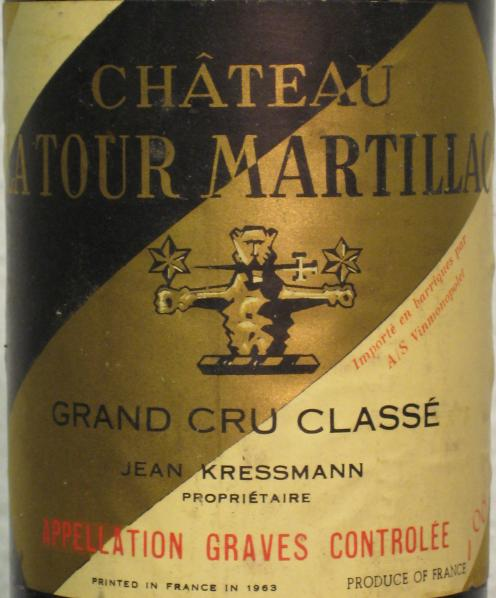
Detail of a Château Latour-Martillac 1962 label

Château Latour-Martillac, previously Château La Tour-Martillac and known as Kressmann La Tour, is a Bordeaux wine from the Pessac-Léognan appellation, rated a Cru Classé (Classed Growth) in the 1953 Classification of Graves wine. The winery is located in the central part of France’s Bordeaux wine region Graves, in the commune of Martillac.

The winery has produced a red second wine named Lagrave Martillac since 1986, and a dry white since 1990.

== History ==
A small fortified castle from the 12th century existed until the French Revolution, leaving behind only the tower that gives the estate its name. Viticulture first began in the 19th century when the land was attached to the estate of Château de la Brède, birthplace of Montesquieu. Under the ownership of Monsieur Charropin, the estate took the identity of Latour-Martillac, but the wine it produced was not noted as remarkable until the involvement of Edward Kressmann. A German wine trader, he became gradually more involved in the vinification from when he first began distributing Latour-Martillac, until he acquired the estate in 1929.

Following the death of the owner, Kressmann faced the risk of losing a wine that had been a favourite of his clients for generations, so he bought it outright.

Already by 1884, Edward Kressmann had planted white grape varieties and, in 1892 launched the wine Graves Monopole Dry which was successful. The estate was eventually passed on to Alfred Kressmann, followed by his son, Jean, in charge since 1940 but inheriting the estate in 1955, who acquired adjacent land expanding the vineyard area to 30 hectares.

Currently, the estate is under the management of the following generation of the Kressmann family, the brothers Tristan and Loïc, working with the consultants Denis Dubourdieu from 1986 and Michel Rolland between 1989 and 2005.

== Production ==
The vineyard area extends to 42 hectares (100 acres), of which 33 ha (82 acres) are dedicated the red wine varieties, 60% Cabernet Sauvignon, 35% Merlot and 5% Petit verdot, and 9 ha (22 acres) for white wine production of the varieties 55% Sémillon, 40% Sauvignon blanc and 5% Muscadelle.

The annual production averages 20,000 cases of the red Grand Vin and 11,000 of the dry white. Of the second wine, Lagrave Martillac made from the estate's youngest vines, there are produced 4,000 cases of red and 2,000 cases of dry white.
