= Château Haut-Bailly =

Bordeaux wine from the Pessac-Léognan appellation

Coordinates: 44.7332°N 0.5815°W

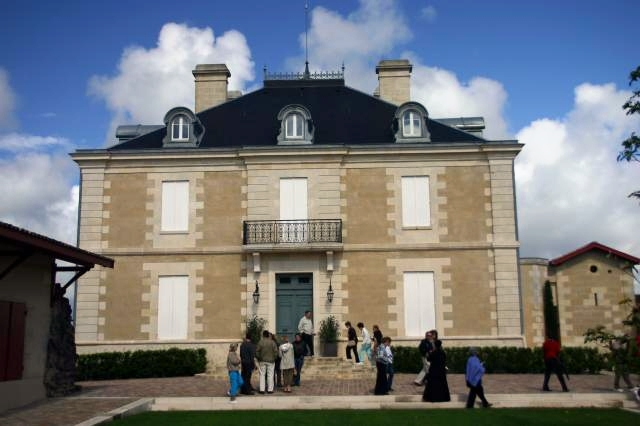
Château Haut-Bailly

Château Haut-Bailly is a Bordeaux wine from the Pessac-Léognan appellation, ranked among the Crus Classés for red wine in the Classification of Graves wine of 1953 and 1959. The winery and vineyards are located south of the city of Bordeaux, in the commune of Léognan.

Château Haut-Bailly's vineyard is located along the left bank of the Garonne river. Neighboring estates include Château Malartic-Lagravière, Château Smith Haut Lafitte and Château Carbonnieux. The estate's second wine is named La Parde de Haut-Bailly.

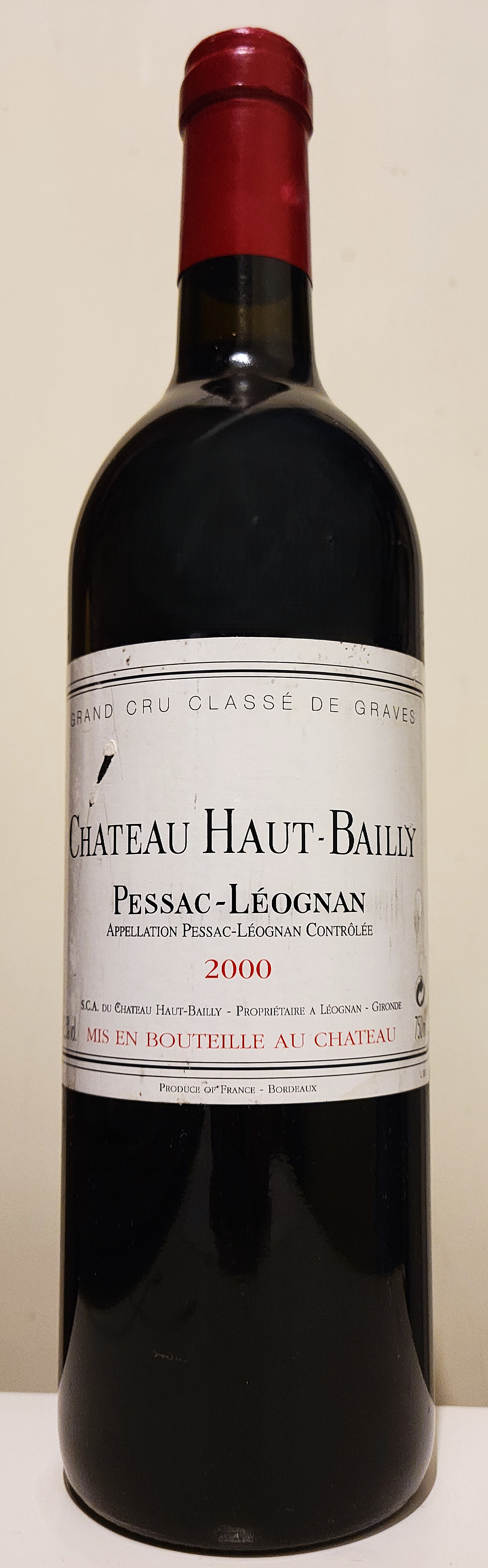
Grand Vin 2000

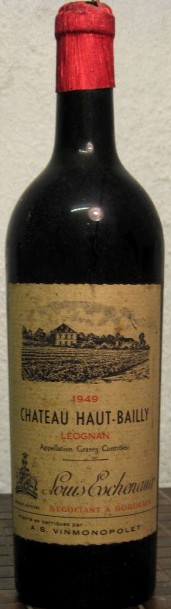
A bottle of Château Haut-Bailly 1949, then under the Graves appellation, but with Léognan clearly labelled.

== History ==
The vineyard is believed to have been created during the 16th century by a rich family from the Pays Basque region. By 1630 it was acquired by the Parisian banker Firmin Le Bailly, who gave his name to the estate. A classification of the leading Graves châteaux by Wilhelm Franck in 1845 illustrates that Haut-Bailly had become known by then, but came to be famous in 1872 when it was bought by Alcide Bellot des Minières, a known viticulturist at the time. Followed by a period of prosperity, such as the 1878 vintage judged outstanding among its peers, there came a decline. With the onset of phylloxera, Bellot des Minières also neglected to follow the examples of other estates who combated the disease, and instead of grafting, relied on spraying with copper ammonia solution. After Bellot des Minières' death in 1906, the estate came to his widow, Marie-Fanny Olivari and then to her daughter, Valentine.

After two decades, Haut-Bailly was sold to Franz Malvesin who during his ownership experimented with some questionable techniques, such as pasteurization and early bottling. After his death in 1923 practices were reverted to normal, though under the various following owners, the results were unremarkable.

In 1955, the property was bought by the Belgian wine merchant Daniel Sanders, beginning a prosperous period of quality and restored reputation. Though known for his meticulous control, there was near the end of Sanders' life a perceived dip in quality in the 1970s, as he was reluctant to release management control to his son, but this eventually happened at his death in 1980, and Jean Sanders was able to resume progress. For several years the late oenologist Émile Peynaud was retained at Haut-Bailly.

The current owner, since 1998, is the estate of the late American banker Robert G. Wilmers who died on 16 December 2017, with Daniel Sanders' grand daughter Veronique Sanders functioning as general manager, and Gabriel Vialard employed as technical manager.

== Production ==
The soil consists of sand mixed with the gravel that gives the Graves appellation its name. From a 32-hectare (79-acre) estate, the vineyard area extends 28 hectares (69 acres) with the plantings are divided up as 65% Cabernet Sauvignon, 25% Merlot and 10% Cabernet Franc.

The grapes for Haut-Bailly are harvested by hand, processed, and then fermented for up to ten days in both temperature controlled stainless steel and concrete vats of varying sizes. After maceration the wines are aged for eighteen months in oak barrels, many of which are new.

In total the estate produces 150,000 bottles annually. In a typical vintage, between thirty and forty percent of the wine is relegated to the estate's second wine, Haut-Bailly II, produced since 1967, under the name Domaine de la Parde until 1979, then La Parde de Haut-Bailly until 2018. A generic Pessac-Léognan third wine, titled HB, has been produced since 1987 and was known as Pessac-Léognan by Chateau Haut-Bailly until 2018. Unlike many producers from the Graves appellation, no white wine is made at Haut-Bailly.

The estate has also produced a wine for the duty-free market, Harmony de Haut Bailly, with Gebr. Heinemann. The estate also oversees the wine production at the neighboring Château Le Pape.

== Gallery ==
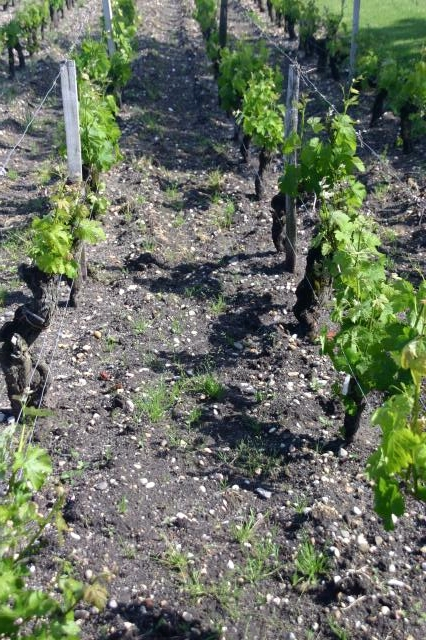
Château Haut-Bailly's vineyard, note the sand and gravel soil composition.

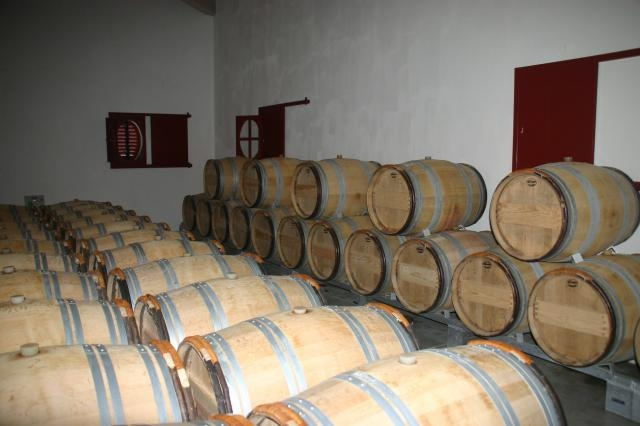
Barrel aging room at Château Haut-Bailly.

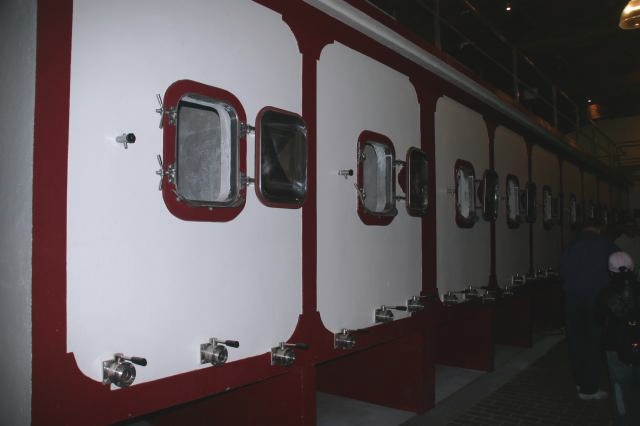
Château Haut-Bailly's temperature controlled concrete fermentation vats.

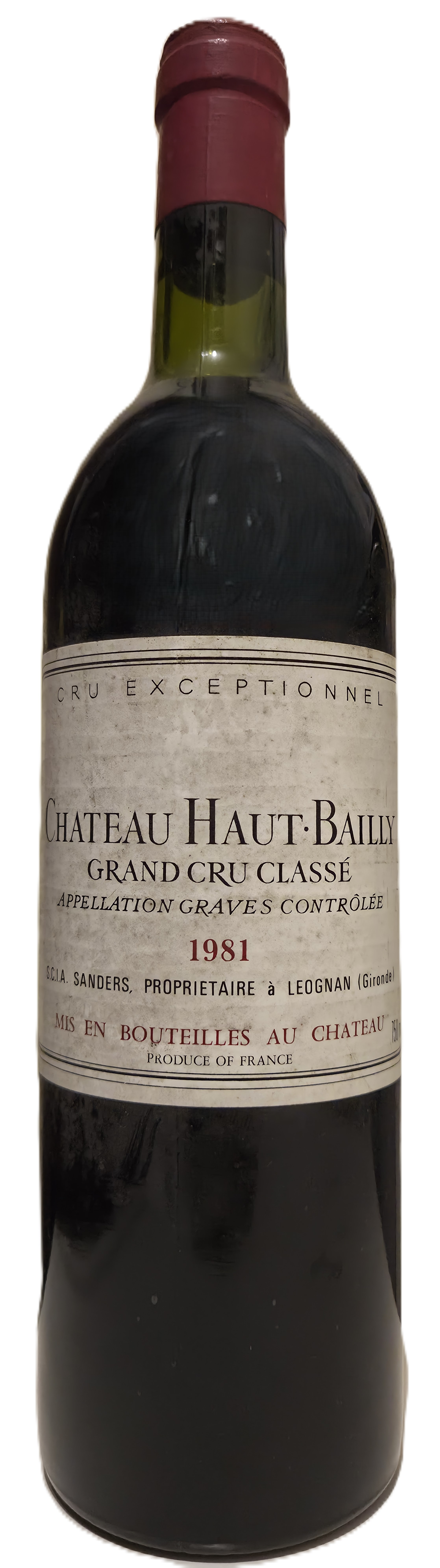
Grand Vin 1981
