= Classification of Graves wine =

Classification of wines from Bordeaux, France

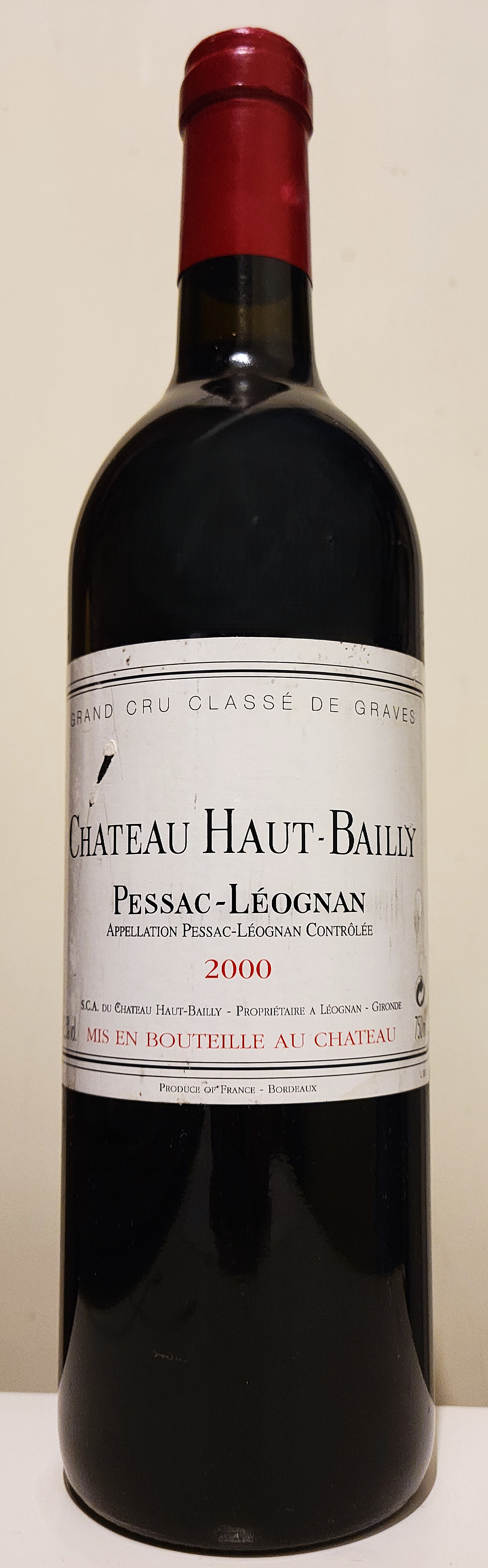
Château Haut-Bailly 2000

Château La Mission Haut-Brion 1990

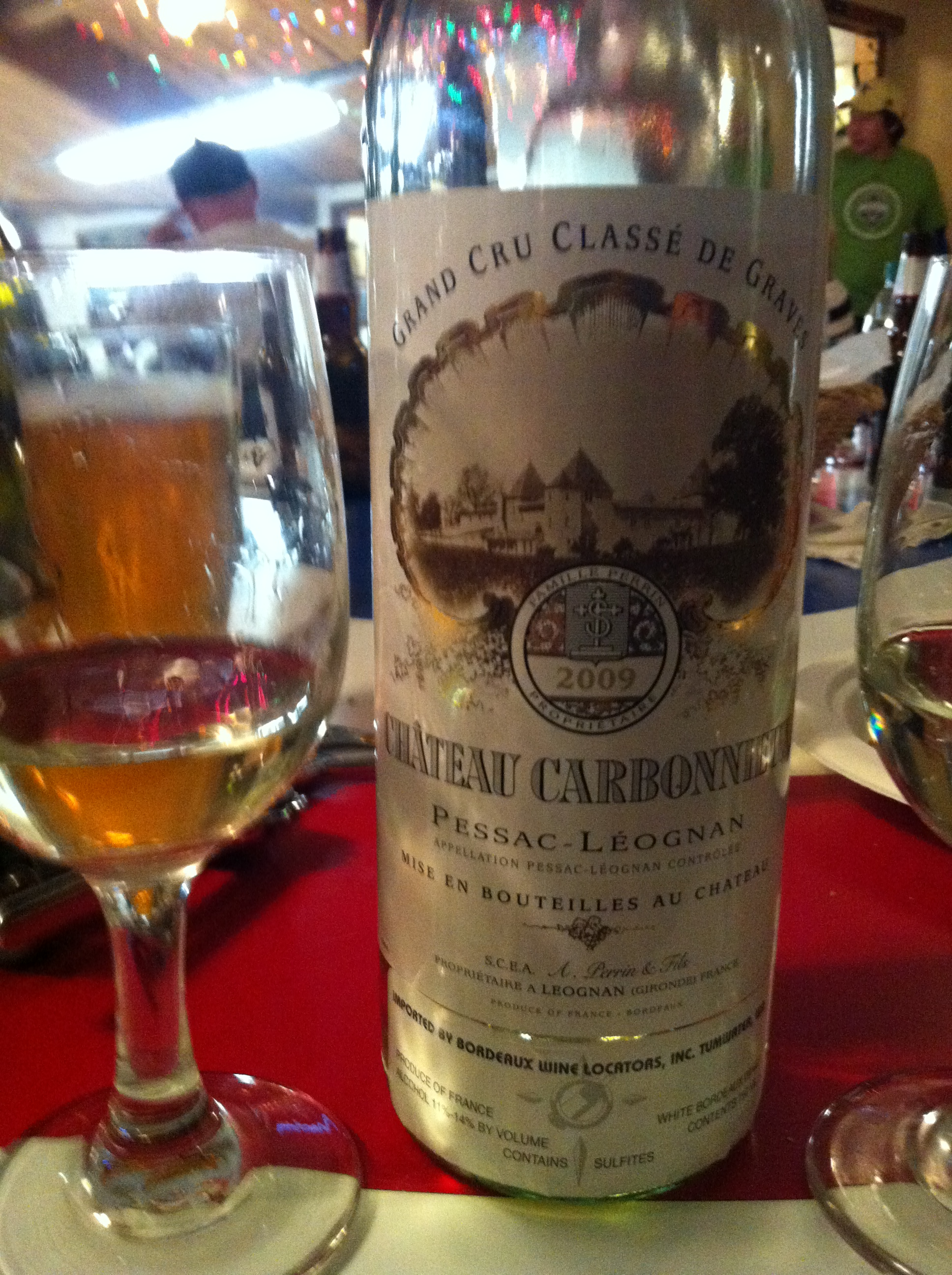
A white Pessac-Leognan wine from the classified estate Château Carbonnieux

The wines of Graves in the wine-growing region of Bordeaux were classified in 1953 by a jury appointed by the Institut National des Appellations d'Origine, and approved by the Minister of Agriculture in August of that year. The selection was revised with a few additions in February 1959. The classification concerns both red and white wines, and all chateaux belong to the appellation Pessac-Léognan, which eventually came into effect on September 9, 1987.

== 1959 classification ==
Crus classé	Commune	Colour
Château Bouscaut	Cadaujac	red and white
Château Carbonnieux	Léognan	red and white
Domaine de Chevalier	Léognan	red and white
Château Couhins	Villenave-d'Ornon	white
Château Couhins-Lurton	Villenave d'Ornon	white
Château de Fieuzal	Léognan	red
Château Haut-Bailly	Léognan	red
Château Haut-Brion^{[a]}	Pessac	red
Château Latour-Martillac	Martillac	red and white
Château Laville Haut-Brion	Talence	white
Château Malartic-Lagravière	Léognan	red and white
Château La Mission Haut-Brion	Pessac	red
Château Olivier	Léognan	red and white
Château Pape Clément	Pessac	red
Château Smith Haut Lafitte	Martillac	red
Château La Tour Haut-Brion^{[b]}	Talence	red

== See also ==
- Regional wine classification
- Bordeaux wine regions
- History of Bordeaux wine

== Notes ==
a. Also rated as a Premier Cru in the Bordeaux Wine Official Classification of 1855.
b. Château La Tour Haut-Brion was discontinued after the 2005 vintage.
