= Pessac-Léognan =

Wine growing area in France

Coordinates: 44.7597°N 0.6041°W

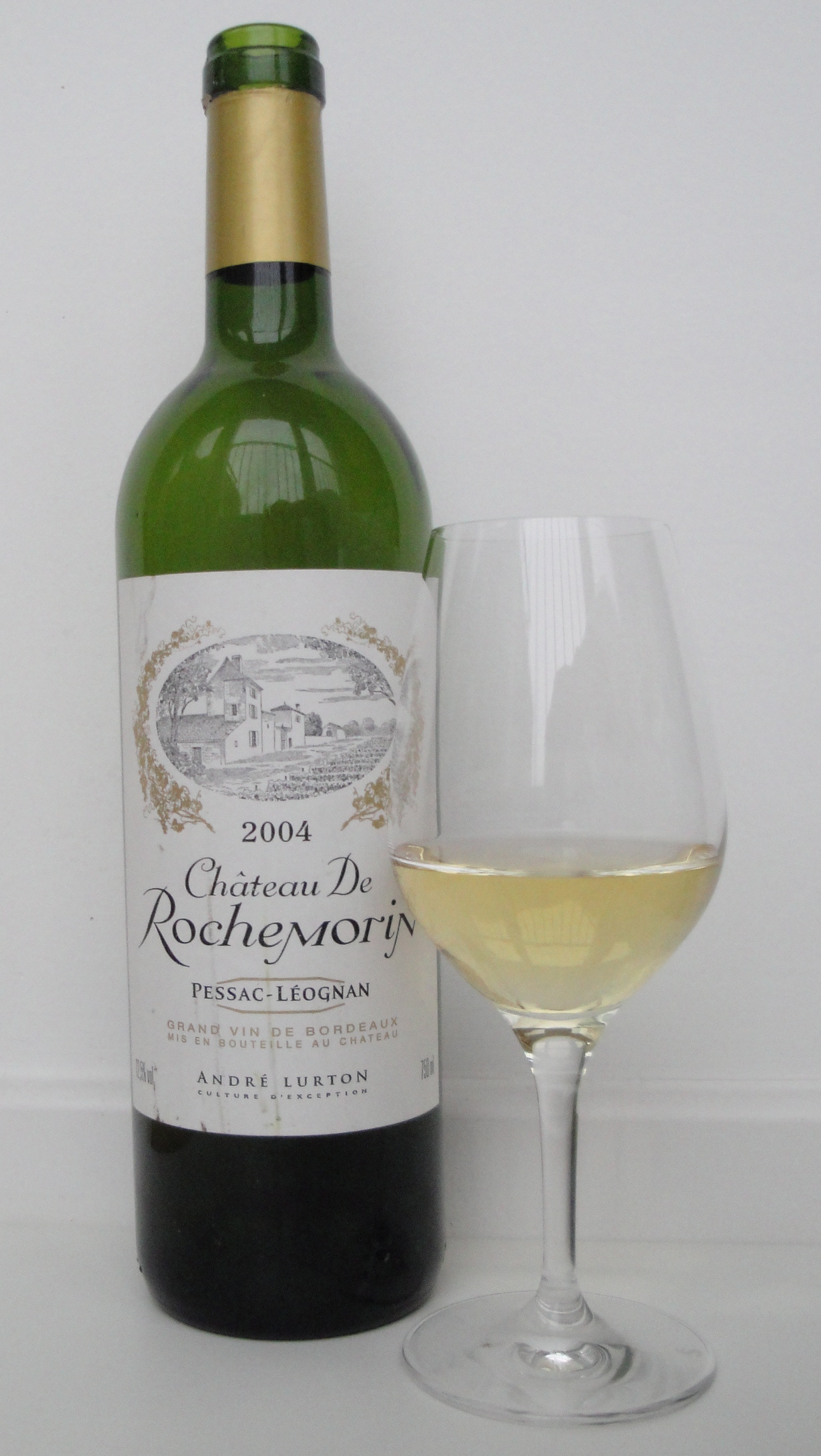
A white wine from Pessac-Léognan.

Pessac-Léognan (French: [pɛsak leɔɲɑ̃]) is a wine growing area and Appellation d'Origine Contrôlée, in the northern part of the Graves region of Bordeaux. Unlike most Bordeaux appellations, Pessac-Léognan is equally famous for both red and (dry) white wines, although red wine is still predominant. It includes the only red-wine producer outside the Haut-Médoc classified in the Bordeaux Wine Official Classification of 1855, the premier cru Château Haut-Brion, and also includes all of the châteaux listed in the 1953/59 classification of Graves. These classed growths account for a third of the wine produced in Pessac-Léognan.

== Geography ==
Pessac-Léognan, France lies on the left bank of the Garonne. It is immediately south of the city of Bordeaux (with a small portion to the west): indeed some of the northern vineyards of Pessac-Léognan are completely surrounded by the housing estates of Bordeaux, as a result of the city's southward expansion. It consists of 8 communes: (from north to south) Mérignac, Talence, Pessac, Gradignan, Villenave-d'Ornon, Cadaujac, Léognan and Martillac. A significant part of the area is forested. It includes 1,580 hectares (3,900 acres) of vines. The soil is very gravelly.

== History ==
Pessac-Léognan has a long wine-making history. Red wine from this region (and the rest of Graves) was the wine originally loved by the English as claret, during the 300 years that Aquitaine was under English rule, from 1152 to 1453. The area includes the oldest named property in Bordeaux, Château Pape Clément, founded by Pope Clement V in 1306. In the mid-seventeenth century, Château Haut-Brion became the first château of international renown, being praised by Samuel Pepys in 1663, while the Médoc was still swamp.

However, the appellation of Pessac-Léognan is relatively recent, dating to 1987. Before then, the area was part of the Graves AOC, and known informally as Haut-Graves.

== Wine ==
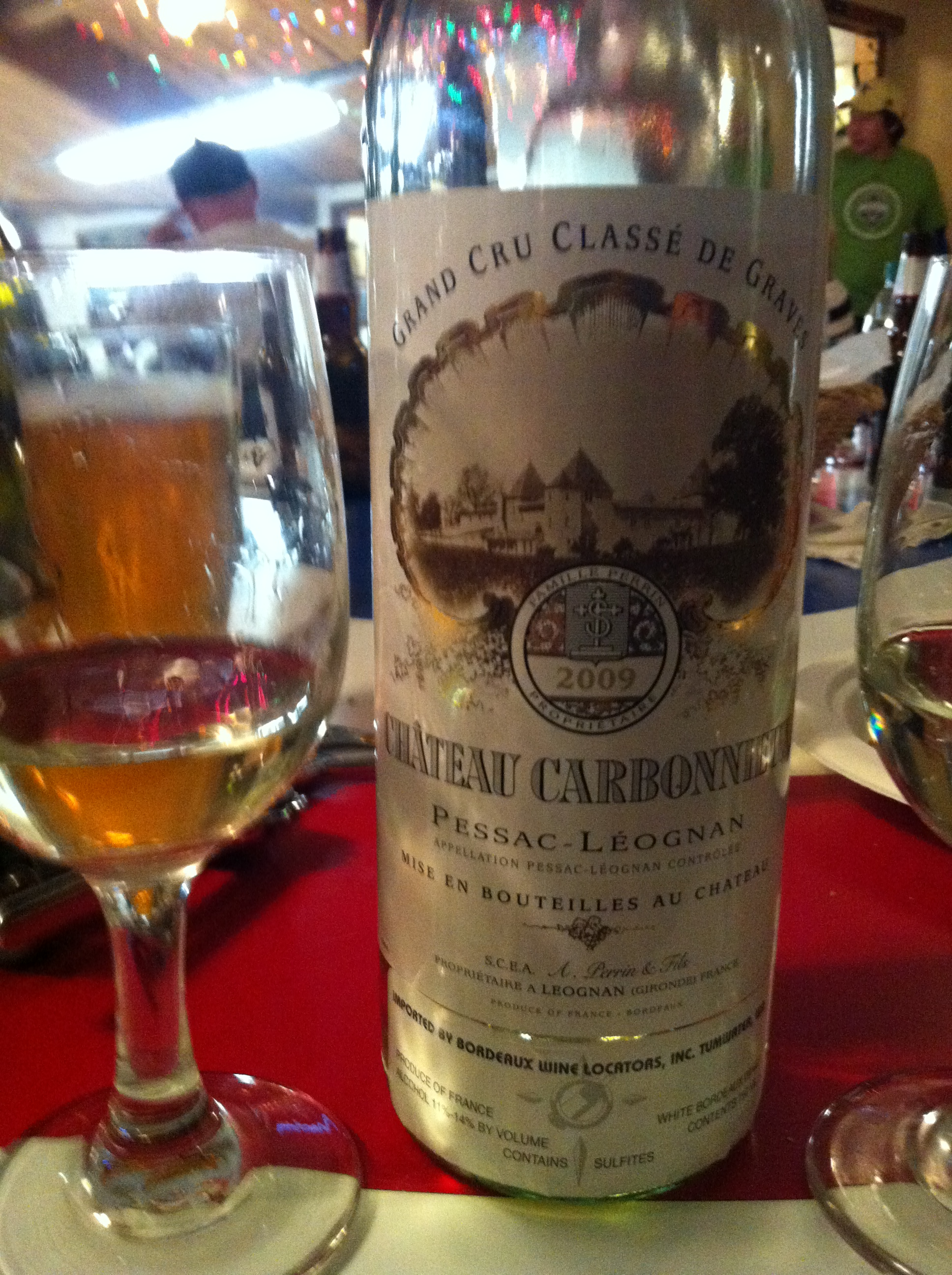
A white Pessac-Leognan wine from the classified estate Château Carbonnieux.

=== Red wine ===
As with the Médoc to the north, Cabernet Sauvignon is the predominant grape, but a somewhat greater proportion of Merlot is typically used in the blend. Cabernet Franc is also used, with small amounts of Petit Verdot and Malbec. Styles vary more widely than in most Bordeaux AOCs, but typical flavours are blackcurrant and cedar, and the wines are often described as 'earthy'.

=== White wine ===
Sauvignon blanc and Sémillon are the grapes used, usually blended. The wine is typically fermented in barrels at a low temperature. Nectarine is a typical flavor when the wines are young, maturing (over 7–15 years) into flavours of nuts, honey and custard. They are said to be among France's greatest whites.

== Food matching ==
The traditional pairing for reds is with roast lamb, although they are flexible enough to have with ham, beef or game. The whites complement fish and seafood.

== Châteaux ==
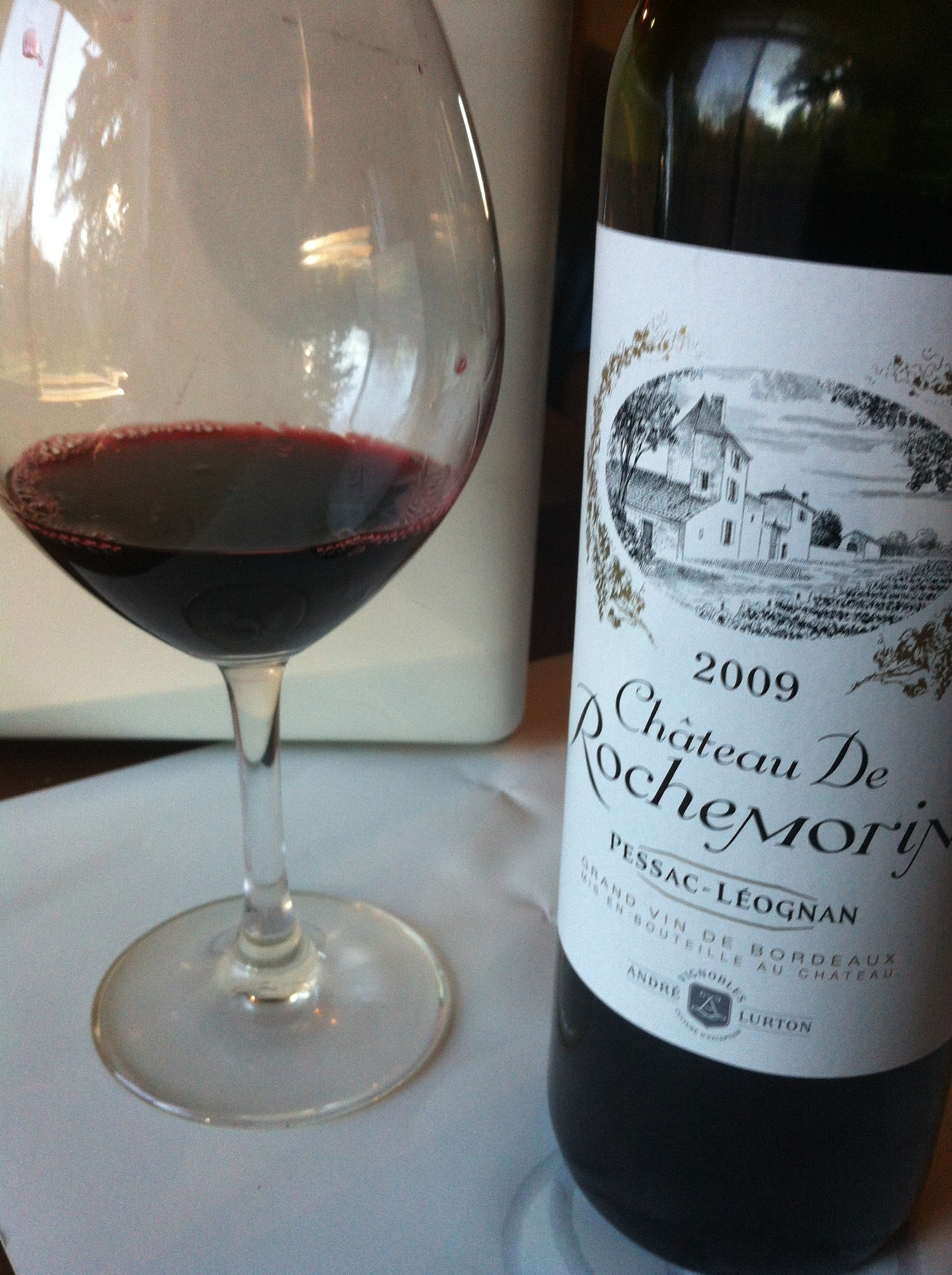
A red wine from the Pessac-Léognan region.

=== First growth (1855 classification) ===
Château Haut-Brion

=== Classed growths (1959 classification) (by commune) ===
==== Cadaujac ====
Château Bouscaut, Château Bardins

==== Léognan ====
Domaine de Chevalier, Château Carbonnieux, Château de Fieuzal, Château Haut-Bailly, Château Malartic Lagravière, Château Olivier

==== Martillac ====
Château Latour-Martillac, Château Smith Haut Lafitte, Clos Marsalette, Château D'Eyran,

==== Pessac ====
Château Haut-Brion, Château Pape Clément, Château Le Sillage, de Malartic

==== Talence ====
Château La Mission Haut-Brion, Château Laville Haut-Brion, Château La Tour Haut-Brion

==== Villenave d'Ornon ====
Château Couhins, Château Couhins-Lurton

=== Other notable châteaux ===
Château Les Carmes Haut-Brion, Château La Louvière, Château Rochemorin, Château Cruzeau, Château Haut-Lagrange

== See also ==
- French wine
- Bordeaux wine regions
