= Domaine de Chevalier =

Coordinates: 44.72081°N 0.62262°W

Domaine de Chevalier is a Bordeaux wine from the Pessac-Léognan appellation, ranked among the Crus Classés for red and white wine in the Classification of Graves wine of 1953 and 1959. The winery and vineyards are located south of the city of Bordeaux, in the commune of Léognan. It is one of a very few Bordeaux estates to be named domaine instead of château.

== History ==
The estate dates from the 18th century, and viticulture of significance was begun during the 19th century when it was run by Arnaud Ricard, also the proprietor of Château Malartic-Lagravière; from 1900 to 1945 it was owned by Gabriel Beaumartin, a son-in-law. Severe frosts in 1945 made partial replanting necessary, and normal production was not resumed until 1953. Managed by Claude Ricard since 1948, the Ricard family was forced to sell the estate in 1983 to the Bernard family of Cognac, though Claude Ricard stayed on as advisor for several years.

Stéphane Derenoncourt is retained as consultant oenologist.

== Production ==
From a property of 80 hectares, the vineyard area consists of 35 hectares of red grape varieties: 65% Cabernet Sauvignon, 30% Merlot, 2.5% Cabernet Franc, and 2.5% Petit Verdot; and 4.5 hectares of white grape varieties: 70% Sauvignon blanc and 30% Sémillon.

The Grand vin, Domaine de Chevalier, is annually produced in 7,000 cases of the red wine and 1,200 cases of the dry white. The red and white second wines, L'Esprit de Chevalier, has a production of 5,800 and 800 cases, respectively.
