= Château Bouscaut =

Type of Bordeaux wine

Coordinates: 44.74680°N 0.54842°W

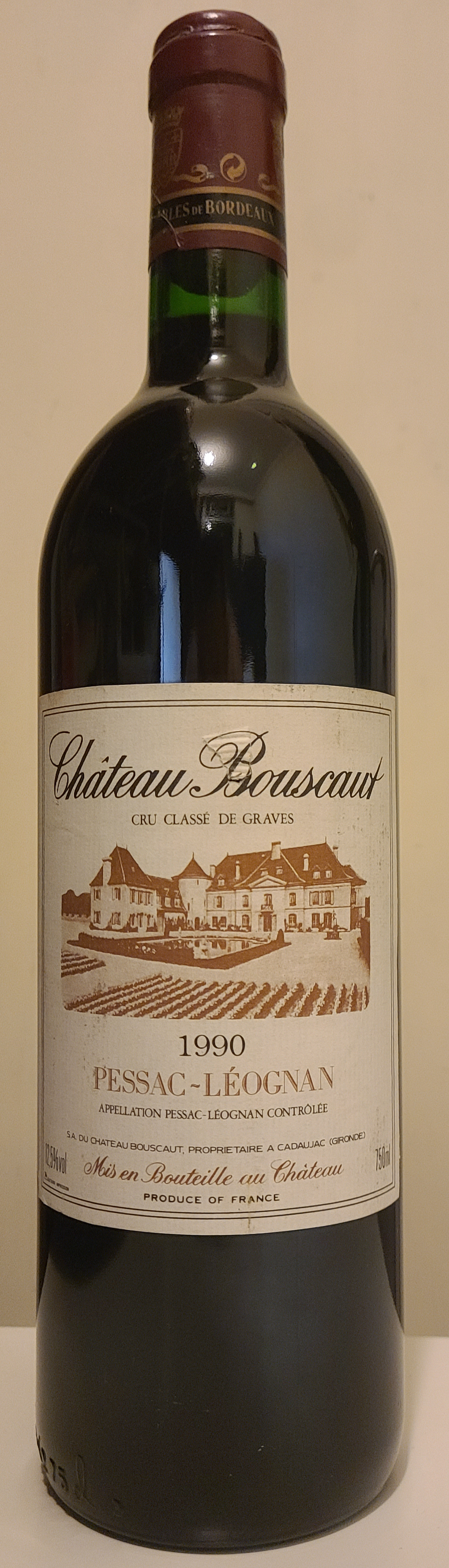
Château Bouscaut 1990

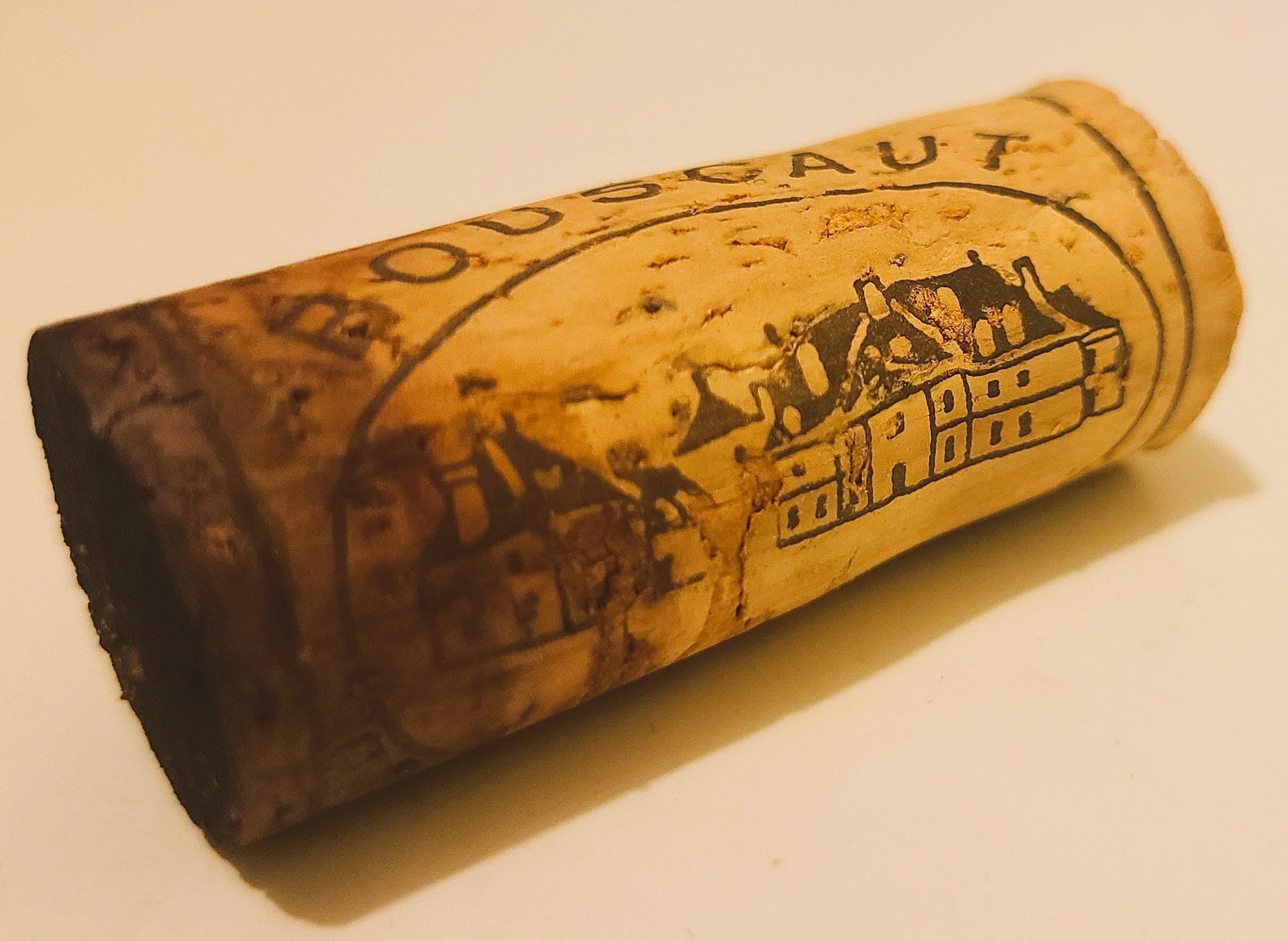
Cork of Bouscaut 1990

Château Bouscaut (French: [ʃɑto busko]) is a Bordeaux wine from the Pessac-Léognan appellation, ranked among the Crus Classés for red and dry white wine in the classification of Graves wine of 1953 and 1959. The winery and vineyards are located south of the city of Bordeaux, in the commune of Cadaujac.

In addition to red and dry white Grand vin the estate also produces the second wine Les Chênes de Bouscaut.

== History ==
Viticulture began at the estate during the 18th century, though its reputation became established just before and after World War I. Under the ownership of Victor Place the 18th-century chateau suffered a serious fire in 1962, and was rebuilt, before the estate was sold to an American syndicate in 1968, with Wohlstetter-Sloan installed as new owners. In 1980 Bouscaut was acquired by Lucien Lurton, the owner of Château Brane-Cantenac.

The current owners of Château Bouscaut are Sophie Cogombles-Lurton Laurent Cogombles.

== Production ==
The vineyard area consists of 47 hectares, 40 of which are planted with the grape varieties 55% Merlot, 40% Cabernet Sauvignon and 5% Malbec. The remaining 7 hectares are cultivated with equal amounts of the white varieties Sémillon and Sauvignon blanc.

The Grand vin, Château Bouscaut, is annually produced in 100,000 bottles of the red wine and 20,000 bottles of the dry white. Of the second wines, Les Chênes de Bouscaut (having replaced the former La Flamme de Bouscaut), 60,000 bottles of red and 25,000 bottles of the dry white are annually produced. The estate is also connected to the production of neighbouring estates Château Lamothe-Bouscaut and Château Valoux.

== Sources ==
- "Bouscaut Fact Sheet" (PDF). Archived from the original (PDF) on 8 July 2011. chateau-bouscaut.com

Footnotes
