= Château Olivier =

Coordinates: 44.74791°N 0.59779°W

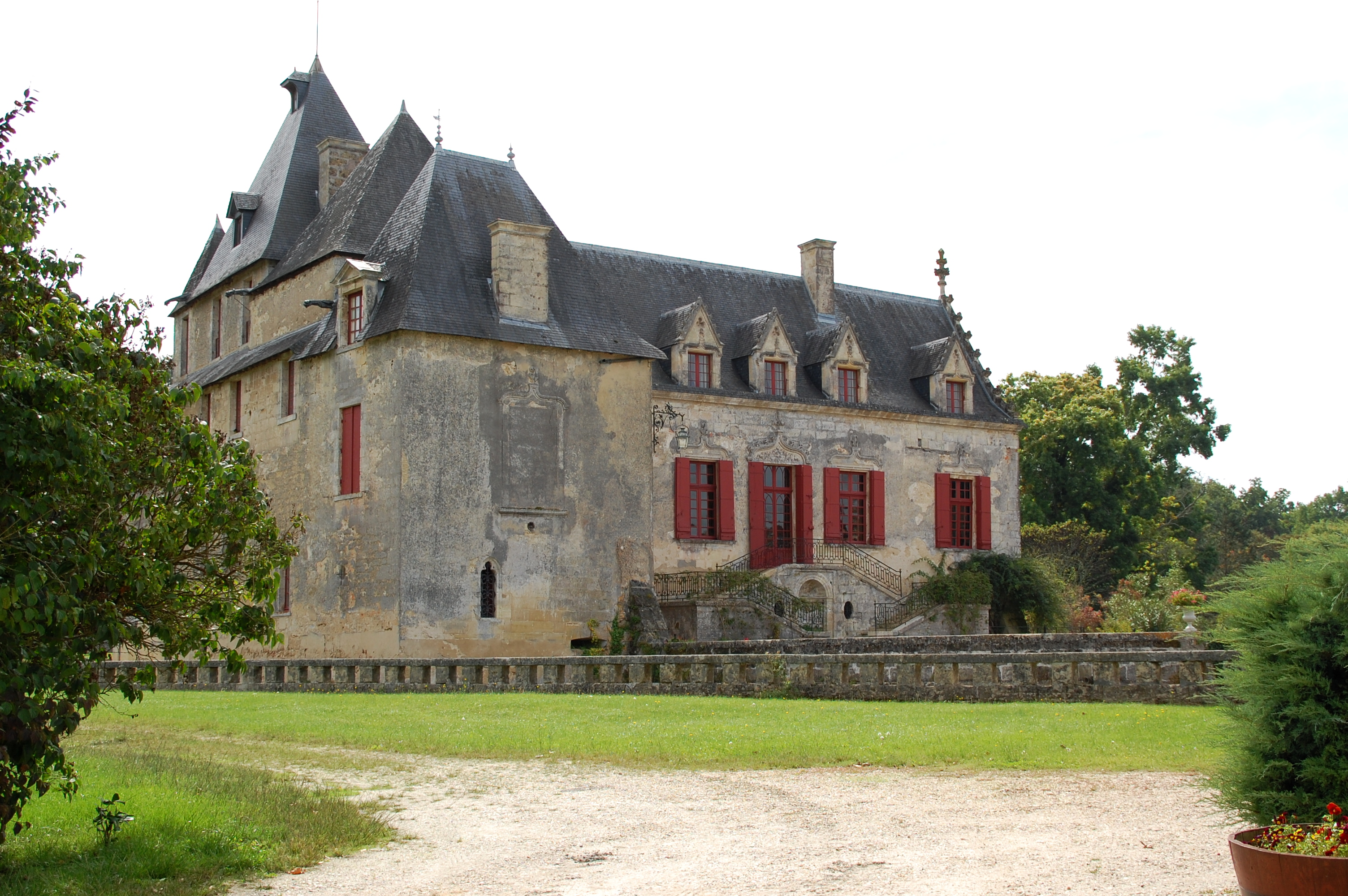
Château Olivier

Château Olivier is a Bordeaux wine from the Pessac-Léognan appellation, ranked among the Crus Classés de Graves for red and dry white wine in the Classification of Graves wine of 1953 and 1959. The winery and vineyards are located south of the city of Bordeaux, in the commune of Léognan.

In addition to red and dry white Grand vin the estate also produces the second wine La Seigneurie d'Olivier du Chateau Olivier.

== History ==
Although the estate has a long history dating back to the 14th century when the property was occupied by the d'Olivey family, viticulture first began when it came to Count Charles-Joseph Maurice d'Etchegoyen in 1846. The estate's actual château, today classified as a monument historique, is of such a nature that it was one of only two Léognan estates given the prefix "château" in the first French edition of Cocks & Féret.

Olivier passed to the Bousset-Salvat family, and then to Alexandre Watcher, and by the marriage of Agnew Watcher and Jacques de Bethmann in the early 20th century, the present owners De Bethmann family took control. Château Olivier was managed by Jean-Jacques de Bethmann, until his death in July 2012 led to his son Alexandre de Bethmann assuming control.

== Production ==
From a largely forested estate of 220 hectares the vineyard area consists of 50 hectares, 38 of which are planted with grape varieties of 45% Cabernet Sauvignon, 45% Merlot and 10% Cabernet Franc. 12 hectares are cultivated with white varieties of 55% Sémillon, 40% Sauvignon blanc and 5% Muscadelle.

The Grand vin, Château Olivier, is annually produced in 18,000 cases of the red wine and 6,000 cases of the dry white.
