= Château Couhins =

Château Couhins is a Bordeaux wine estate from the Pessac-Léognan appellation, ranked among the Grands Crus Classés for dry white wine in the Classification of Graves wine of 1959. The winery is located in close Southern vicinity of the city of Bordeaux, in the commune of Villenave-d'Ornon.

The estate also produces a red Grand vin, red and dry white second wines named "Couhins La Gravette", and a red third wine, "La Dame de Couhins".

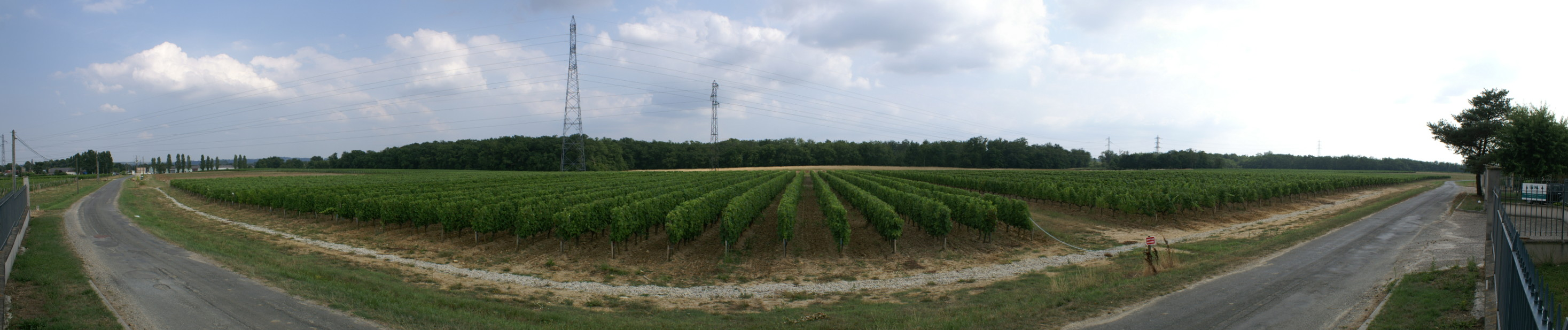
Panorama of the Château Couhins vineyards.

== History ==
Once a large and celebrated estate, owned by the Gasqueton and Hanappier families, it became the property of Institut National de la Recherche Agronomique (INRA) in 1968, which became INRAE in 2020. The institute conducts some of its research on sustainable grape and wine production at the estate. A smaller portion was sold on to André Lurton, now a neighboring estate named Château Couhins-Lurton.

== Production ==
The vineyard area is divided between 7 hectares with white grape varieties of 85% Sauvignon blanc and 15% Sémillon and 15 hectares with red grape varieties of 50% Merlot, 40% Cabernet Sauvignon, 9% Cabernet Franc and 1% Petit Verdot.

Of the Grand vin Château Couhins dry white there is annually produced 20,000 bottles, and of the red 30,000 bottles. Of the second wines Couhins la Gravette there is produced 30,000 bottles of red and 8,000 bottles of dry white, and 5,000 bottles of the red third wine La Dame de Couhins.
