= Château de l'Hospital =

Coordinates: 44.693°N 0.418°W

Château de l'Hospital is a Bordeaux winery in the Graves AOC. It is a 12-acre (4.9 ha) domain. The red wine is made of cabernet franc, cabernet sauvignon, and a small amount of malbec. Madame de Lacaussade took over as winemaker in 1964 following her husband's accidental fall in a vinifying vat and later death, as her sons were not keen to become winemakers.
