= Château de Fieuzal =

French wine

Coordinates: 44.7158°N 0.6096°W

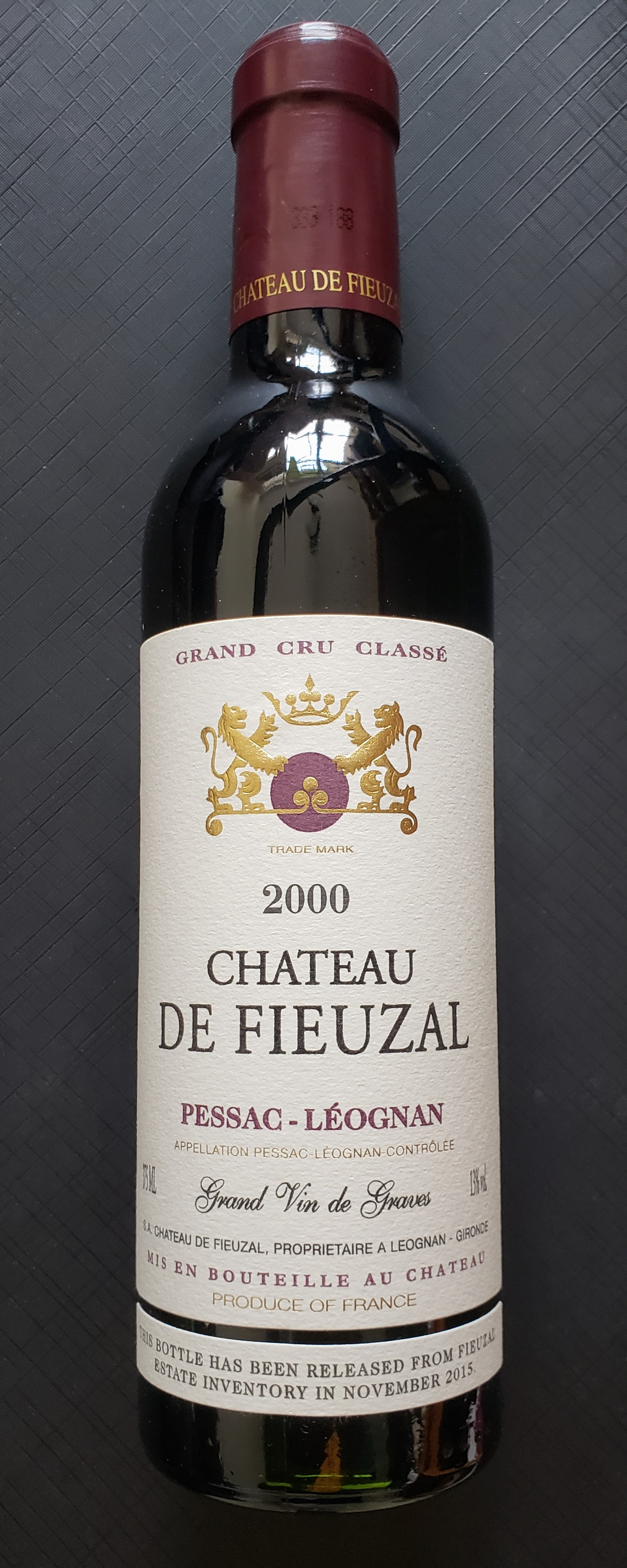
Grand Vin 2000

Château de Fieuzal is a Bordeaux wine from the Pessac-Léognan appellation, ranked among the Crus Classés for red wine in the Classification of Graves wine of 1953 and 1959, though the estate also produces a dry white wine which was not classified. The winery and vineyards are located south of the city of Bordeaux, in the commune of Léognan.

== History ==
An old estate, it was once the property of the La Rochefoucauld family, which came to prominence for its wine under the management of the Swede Erik Bocké whose wife inherited the estate after World War II. Château de Fieuzal was acquired by Lochlann Quinn in 2001.

== Production ==
The vineyard area consists of 48 hectares, 39 hectares of red vines consisting of 60% Cabernet Sauvignon with 33% Merlot, 4.5% Cabernet Franc and 2.5% Petit Verdot, and 9 hectares of white with equal amounts of Sémillon and Sauvignon blanc

Of the Grand vin Château de Fieuzal and the second wine L'Abeille de Fieuzal there is typically a total annual production of 13,000 cases of red wine and 4,000 of dry white.
