= Château Smith Haut Lafitte =

Wine produced in the Bordeaux region of France

Coordinates: 44.73251°N 0.55857°W

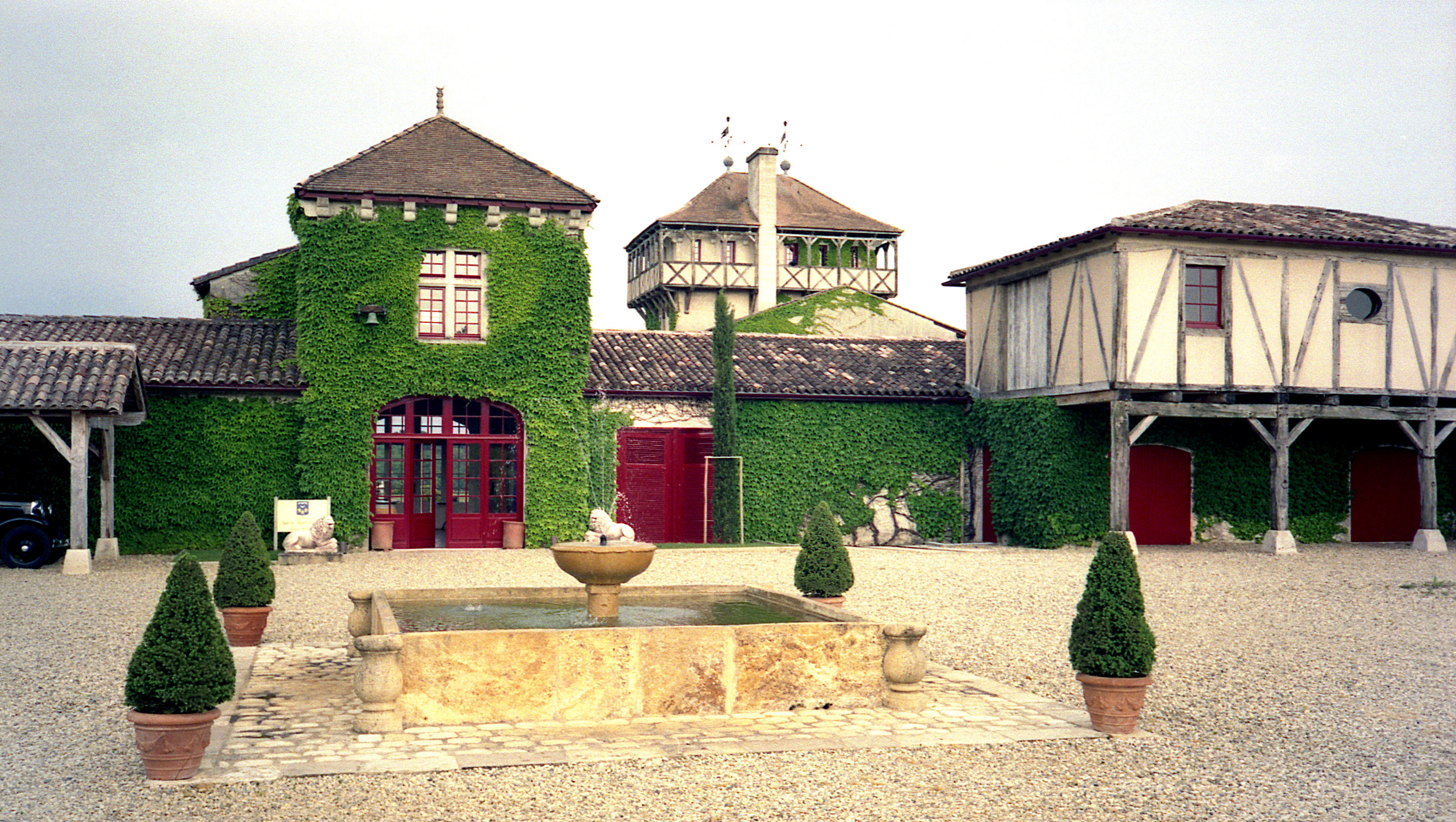
Château Smith Haut Lafitte

Château Smith Haut Lafitte is a Bordeaux wine from the Pessac-Léognan appellation, ranked among the Crus Classés for red wine in the Classification of Graves wine of 1953 and 1959. The winery and vineyards are located south of the city of Bordeaux, in the commune of Martillac.

== History ==
The estate originates in the 14th century with the house of Verrier Du Boscq, who planted vines on a gravelly plateau named Lafitte already in 1365. In 1720, it was bought by the Scotsman Georges Smith, who added his name to the lieu-dit (English: place-name) and who built the manor house of the property.

The Louis Eschenauer company bought the estate in 1958, after having already distributed the wine from the early 20th century. In 1990, Daniel Cathiard bought Smith Haut Lafitte and embarked on an investment programme, including the building of a new cellar.. Daniel Cathiard died in January 2026.

== Production ==
The vineyard area consists of 67 hectares (170 acres), 56 hectares of which are planted with grape varieties of 55% Cabernet Sauvignon, 35% Merlot and 10% Cabernet Franc. The remaining 11 hectares are cultivated with white varieties of 90% Sauvignon blanc, 5% Sémillon and 5% Sauvignon gris.

The Grand vin, Château Smith Haut Lafitte, is annually produced in 10,000 cases of the red wine and 2,500 cases of the dry white. The second wine, Les Hauts de Smith, has a production of 5,500 cases and exists in red, white and rosé versions. The rosé is produced as a Bordeaux AOC.

There is an alternative second wine called Le Petit Haut Lafitte, which is produced exclusively as a red wine, with a higher mix of Cabernet grapes for a more left bank feel; this wine is steadily gaining popularity

== Gallery ==
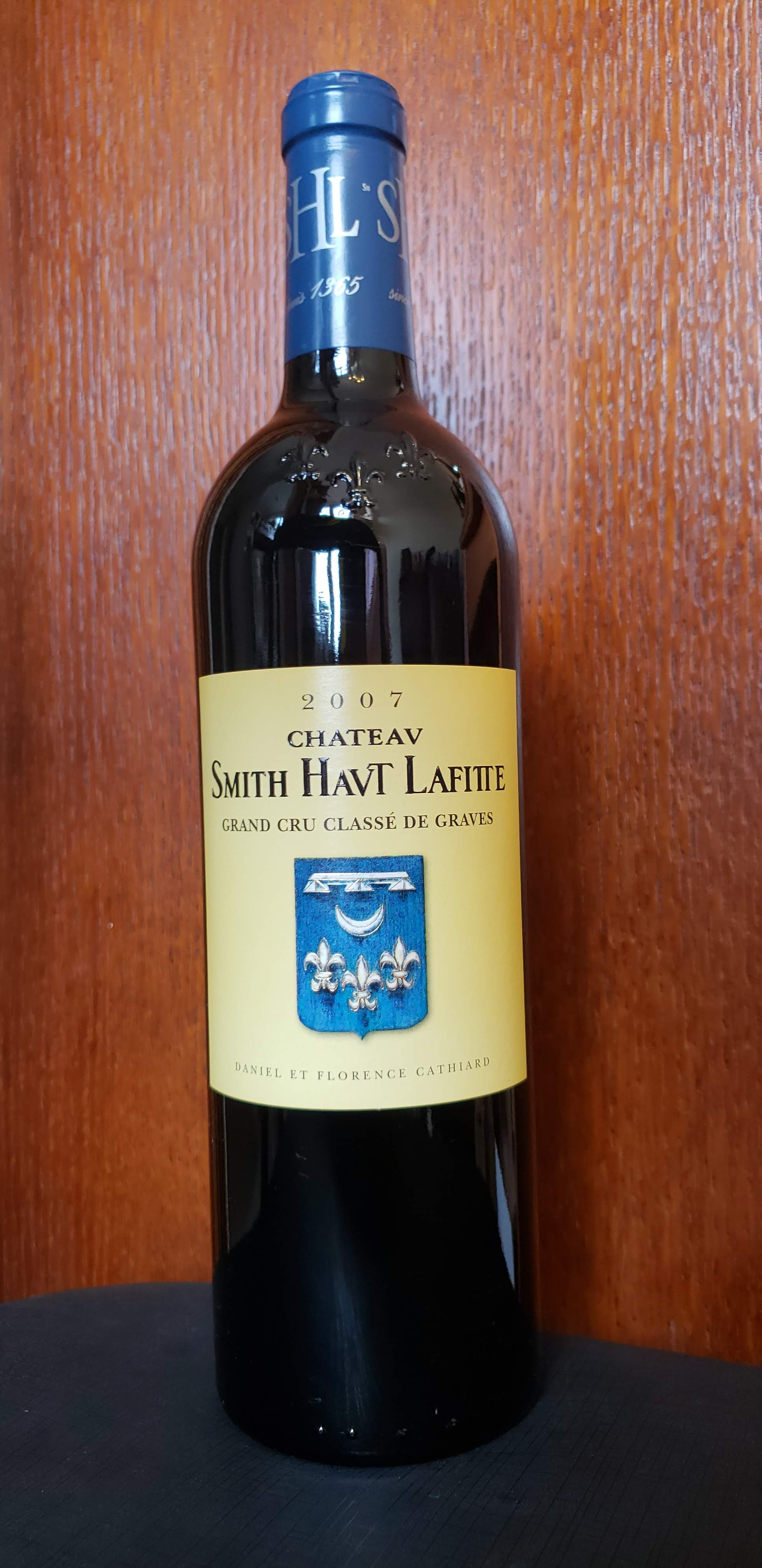
Château Smith Haut Lafitte, 2007 vintage

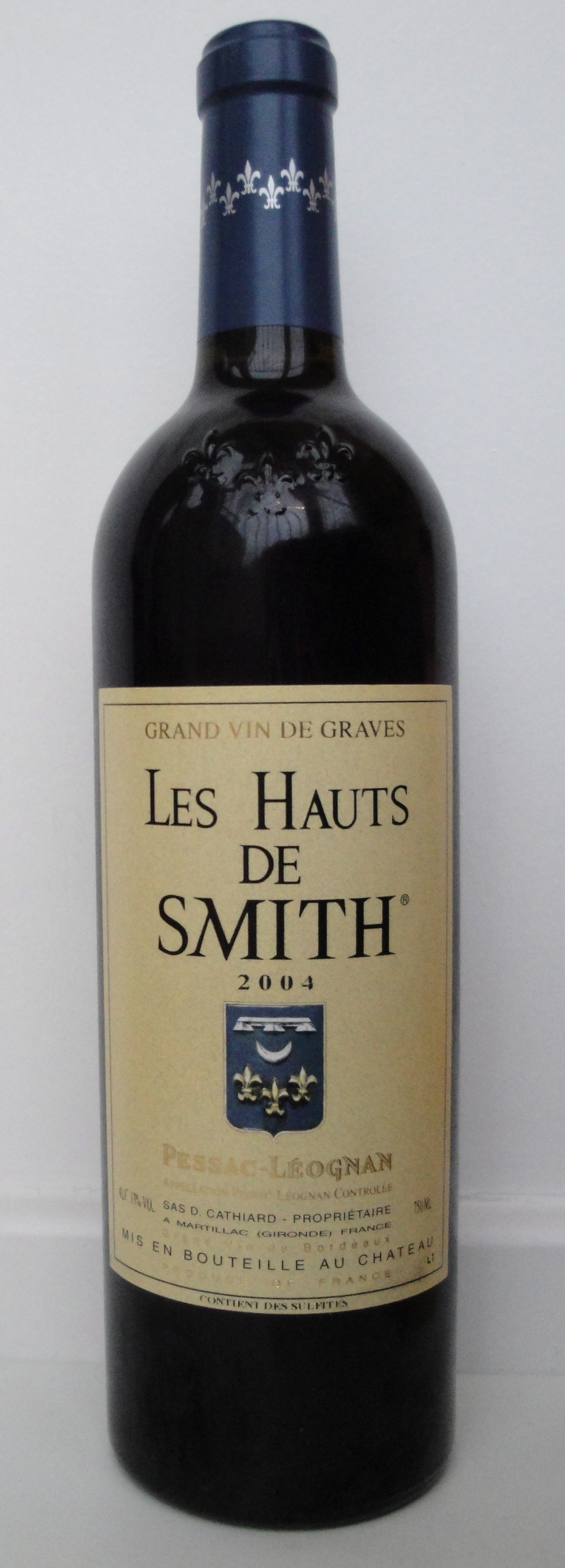
Les Hauts de Smith, the second wine of Château Smith Haut Lafitte
