= Léognan =

- Commune
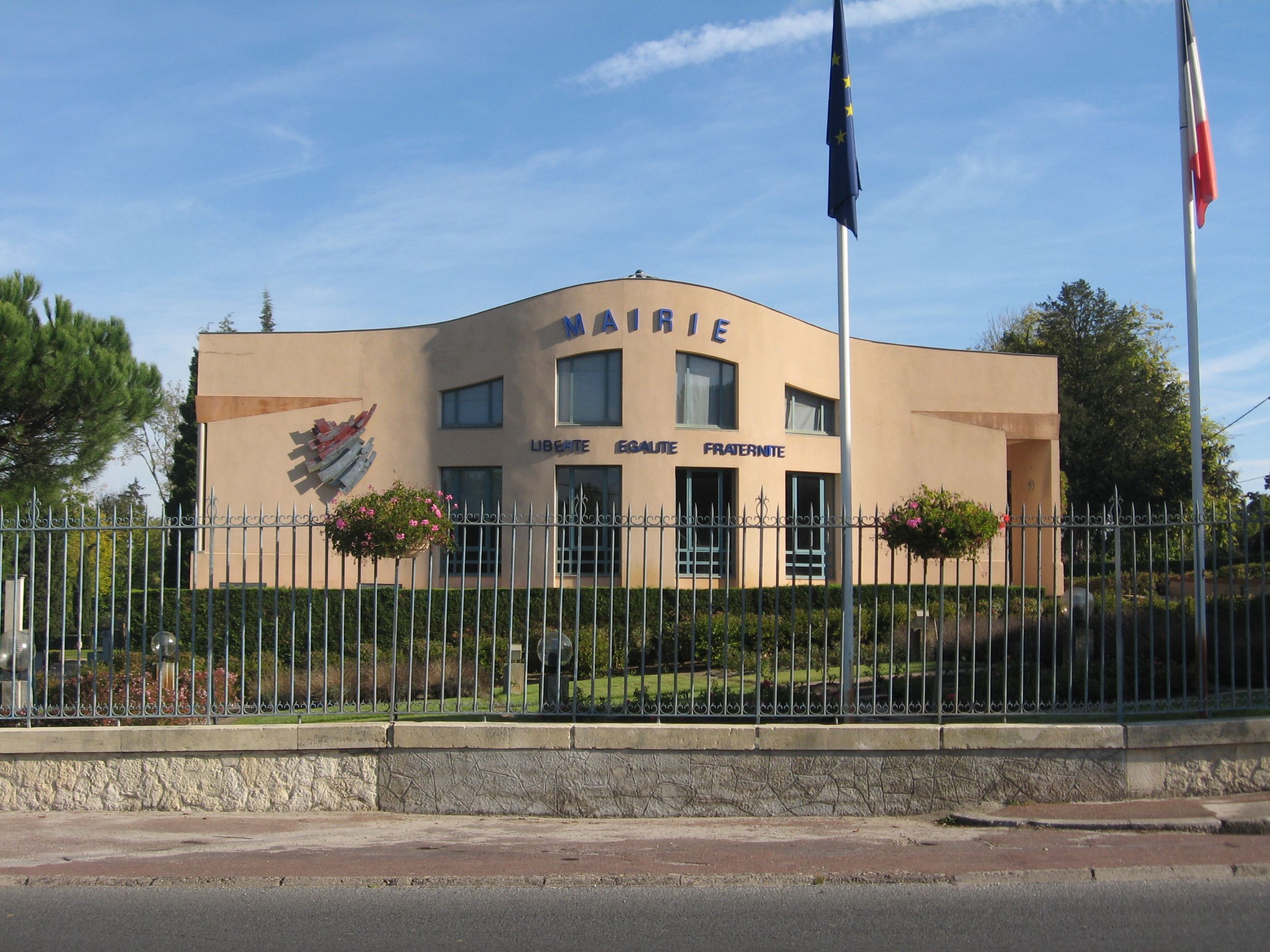
- Town hall

- Coat of arms
- Location of Léognan
- Location within France Location within Nouvelle-Aquitaine
- Coordinates: 44°43′46″N 0°35′59″W
- Country: France
- Region: Nouvelle-Aquitaine
- Department: Gironde
- Arrondissement: Bordeaux
- Canton: La Brède
- Intercommunality: Montesquieu

Government
  - Mayor (2020–2026): Laurent Barban
- Area^{1}: 41.43 km^{2} (16.00 sq mi)
- Elevation: 50 m (160 ft)
- Highest elevation: 62 m (203 ft)
- Lowest elevation: 13 m (43 ft)
- Population (2023): 10,670
  - Density: 257.5/km^{2} (667.0/sq mi)
- Time zone: UTC+01:00 (CET)
  - Summer (DST): UTC+02:00 (CEST)
- INSEE/Postal code: 33238 /33850
- ^{1} French Land Register data, which excludes lakes, ponds, glaciers > 1 km^{2} (0.386 sq mi or 247 acres) and river estuaries.

Léognan (French pronunciation: [leɔɲɑ̃]; Gascon: Leunhan) is a commune in the Gironde department, Nouvelle-Aquitaine, southwestern France.

== Population ==
Its inhabitants are called Léognanais in French.

Historical population
Year	Pop.	±% p.a.
1968	3,044	—
1975	5,141	+7.77%
1982	7,737	+6.01%
1990	8,008	+0.43%
1999	8,269	+0.36%
2007	8,967	+1.02%
2012	9,586	+1.34%
2017	10,372	+1.59%
2023	10,670	+0.47%
Source: INSEE

== Wine ==
It is located in the Graves area of the Bordeaux county, known for its red wine (Pessac-Léognan appellation):

- Château Haut-Bailly
- Domaine de Chevalier
- Château de Fieuzal
- Château Olivier
- Château Carbonnieux
- Château Malartic Lagravière

The processing plant for Cacolac has been located here since 2000.

== See also ==
- Communes of the Gironde department
