= Château Couhins-Lurton =

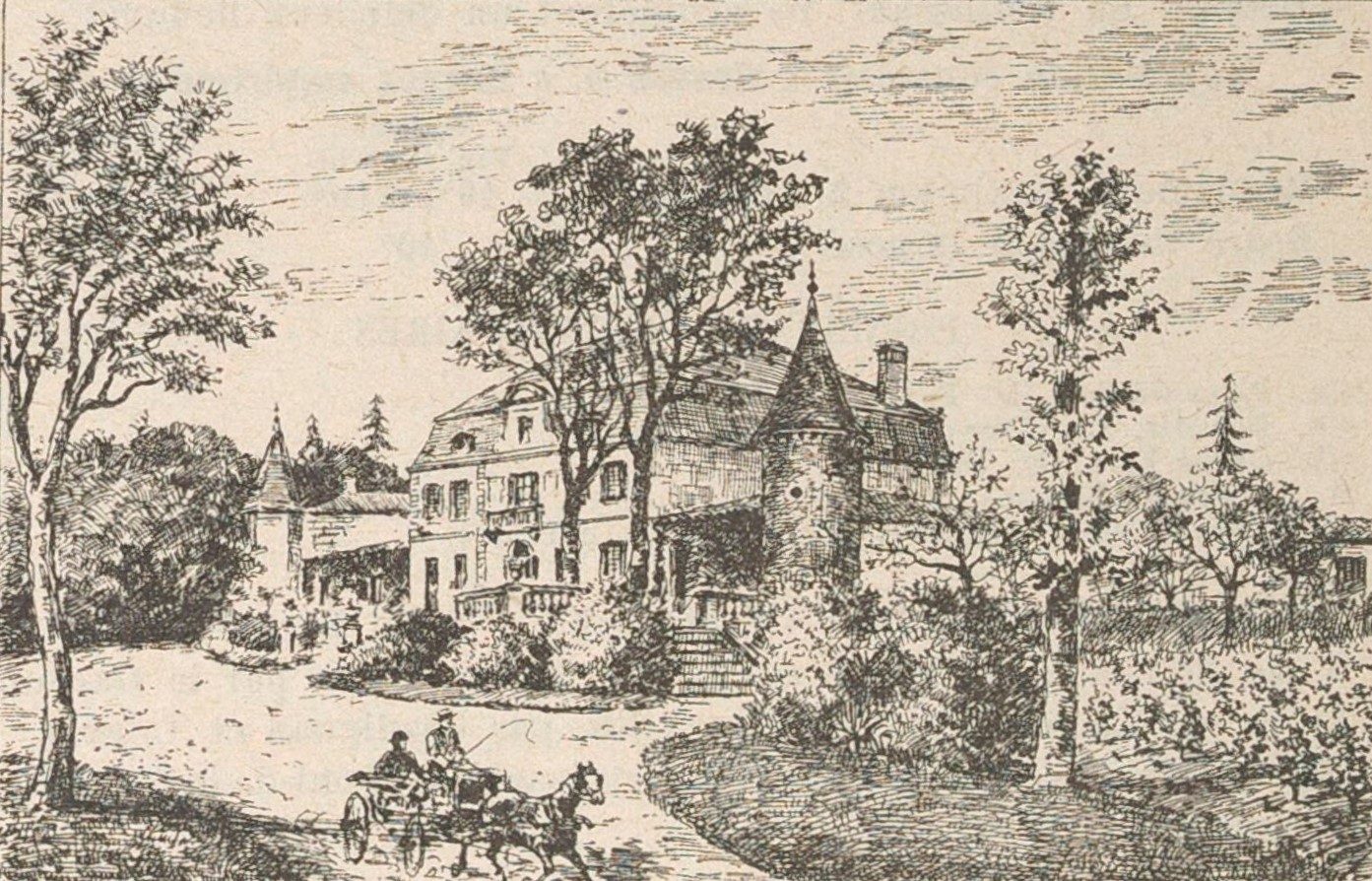
Illustration of Château Couhins in the book Bordeaux et ses vins by Charles Cocks and Edouard Féret published in 1949

Château Couhins-Lurton is a Bordeaux wine from the Pessac-Léognan appellation, ranked among the Crus Classés for dry white wine in the Classification of Graves wine of 1959. The winery is located in close vicinity of the city of Bordeaux, in the commune of Villenave-d'Ornon.

In addition to the classed dry white Grand vin, the estate also produces a red.

== History ==
Once a large and celebrated estate, owned by the Gasqueton-Hanappier families, it was acquired by the Institut National de la Recherche Agronomique (INRA) in 1968, and André Lurton who had worked at the estate as a fermier since 1967, bought from INRA a smaller portion of Château Couhins. The 2003 vintage of Château Couhins-Lurton was the first classified Bordeaux wine to be sealed with an alternative wine closure when it was released with a stelvin screw cap closure.

== Production ==
The vineyard area is divided between 6 hectares with 100% of the white grape variety Sauvignon blanc and 17.4 hectares with the red grape varieties of 77% Merlot and 23% Cabernet Sauvignon.
