= Graves (wine region) =

Bordeaux wine region

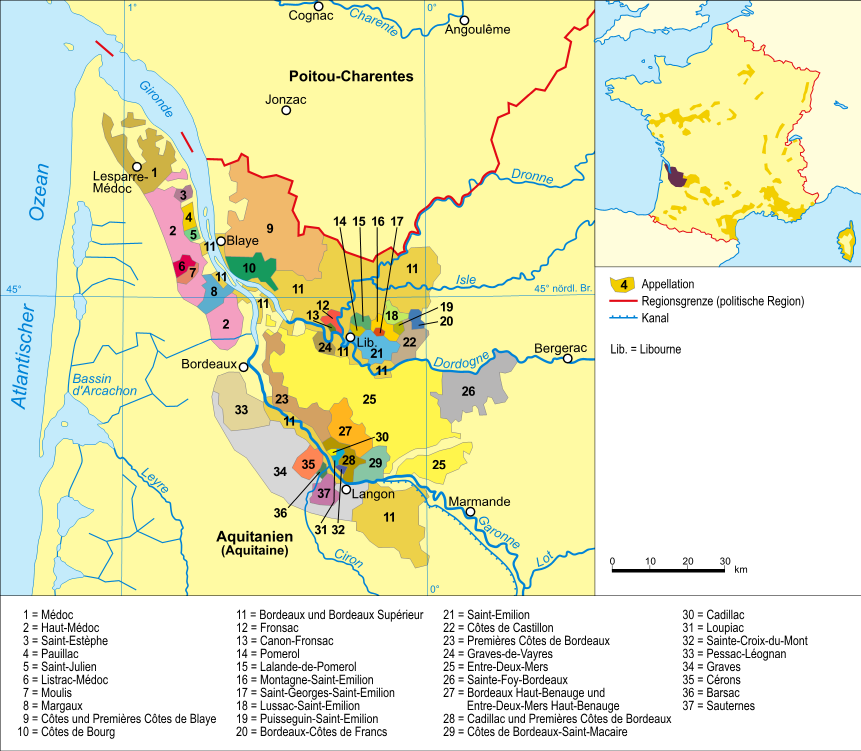
Appellations within the Bordeaux wine region. The appellations of Graves are numbered 33–37 on the map.

Graves (French: [ɡʁav], gravelly land) is an important subregion of the Bordeaux wine region. Graves is situated on the left bank of the Garonne River, in the upstream part of the region, southeast of the city Bordeaux and stretches over 50 kilometres (31 mi). Graves is the only Bordeaux subregion famed for all three of Bordeaux's three main wine types (reds, dry whites and sweet wines) although red wines dominate the total production. Graves AOC is also the name of one Appellation d'origine contrôlée (AOC) that covers most but not all of the Graves subregion.

The area encompasses villages including Sauternes, Pessac, Talence, Léognan, Martillac, Saint-Morillon, and Portets.

The name "Graves" derives from its intensely gravelly soil. The soil is the result of glaciers from the Ice Age, which also left white quartz deposits that can still be found in the soil of some of the top winemaking estates.

== History ==
The Graves is considered the birthplace of claret. Its wine production for export dates back to Eleanor of Aquitaine, who married Henry II, King of England, creating a flourishing trade between both countries: wine versus coal and iron. In the Middle Ages, the wines that were first exported to England were produced in this area. At that time, the Médoc subregion, north of Bordeaux, still consisted of marshland unsuitable for viticulture though Graves were naturally better drained.

Château Pape Clément, which was founded at the turn of the 14th century by the future Pope Clement V, was the first named chateau in all of Bordeaux. In 1663, Samuel Pepys's mention of Château Haut-Brion was the first recorded mention of French claret in London.

After Médoc was drained by the Dutch in mid-17th century, Médoc gradually took over the role as the source of the most prized Bordeaux wines. In the Bordeaux Wine Official Classification of 1855, only one Graves property, Château Haut-Brion, one of the four original First Growths, was included among the red wines, with all the rest being Médoc properties. All the sweet wines of the 1855 classification were from Sauternes, which is a part of Graves.

A classification of Graves wine was carried out in 1953 for its red wine producers. Dry white wines were included in an updated 1959 classification. In 1987, the part of Graves containing most of the producers of its most expensive wines, closest to the city of Bordeaux itself, created a separate AOC under the name Pessac-Léognan. This has had the effect of devaluing the name and price of wines simply labeled with the Graves appellation.

== Wine styles ==
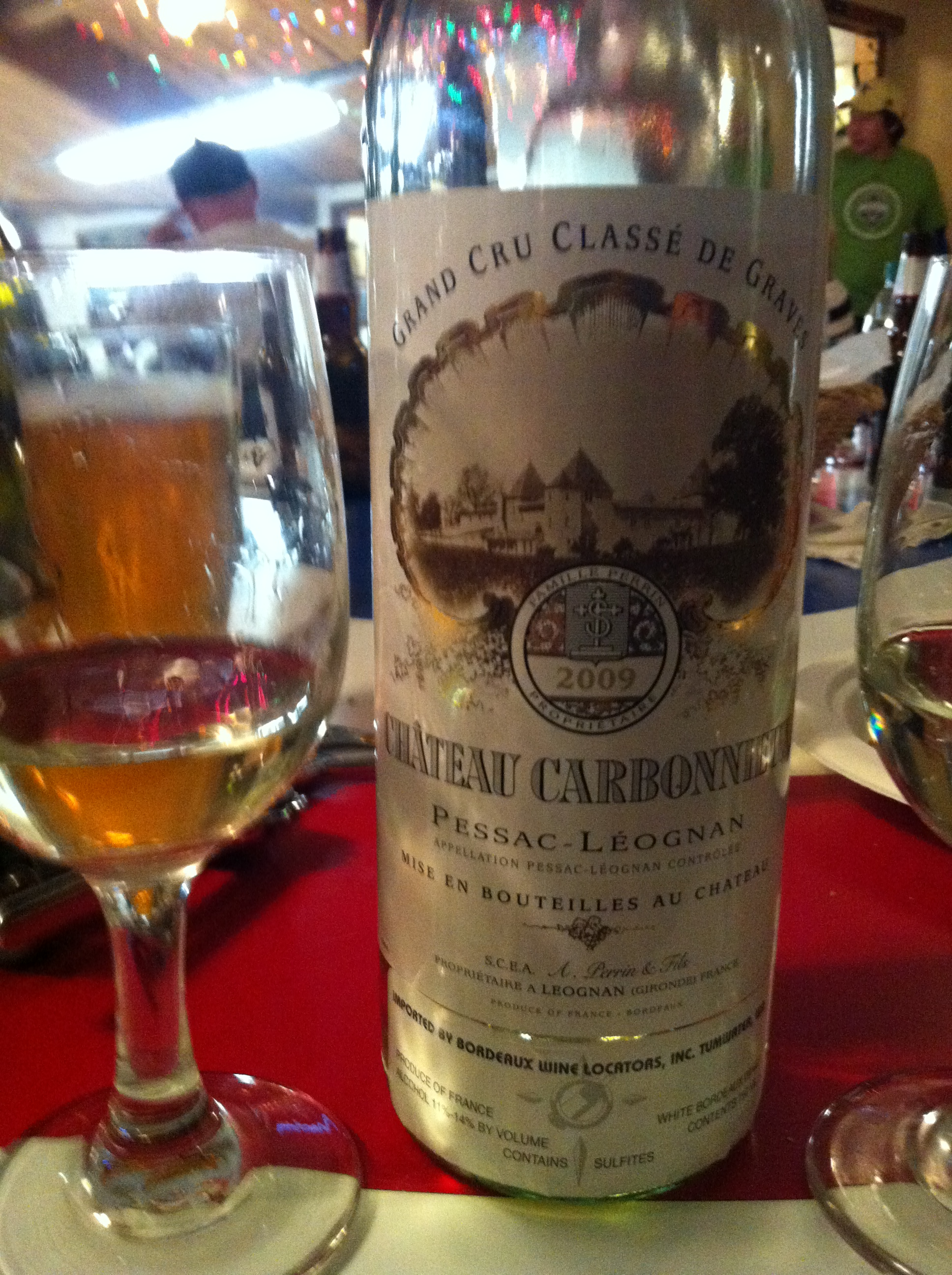
A white Pessac-Leognan wine from the classified estate Château Carbonnieux

As with Médoc, Cabernet Sauvignon is the predominant grape, but a somewhat greater proportion of Merlot is typically used in the blend, with smaller amounts of Cabernet Franc, Petit Verdot and Malbec. The dry white wines are a blend of Sauvignon blanc and Sémillon.

A well-known sweet white dessert wine is made in the commune of Sauternes, which is located in the southeast corner of the Graves region.

== Appellations in Graves ==
The Graves subregion contains the following Appellations d'origine contrôlées (AOCs).

=== Graves AOC ===
Graves AOC is the basic appellation of the Graves subregion, and can be used for both red and dry white wine. 3,100 hectares (7,700 acres) of vineyards were dedicated to this appellation in 2004.

=== Graves Supérieures AOC ===
Graves Supérieures AOC is an appellation for sweet white wine covering the same area as Graves AOC. The wines are generally considered as simpler than those of Cérons AOC. About 500 hectares (1,200 acres) of vineyards were dedicated to the production of Graves Supérieures in 2004.

=== Pessac-Léognan AOC ===
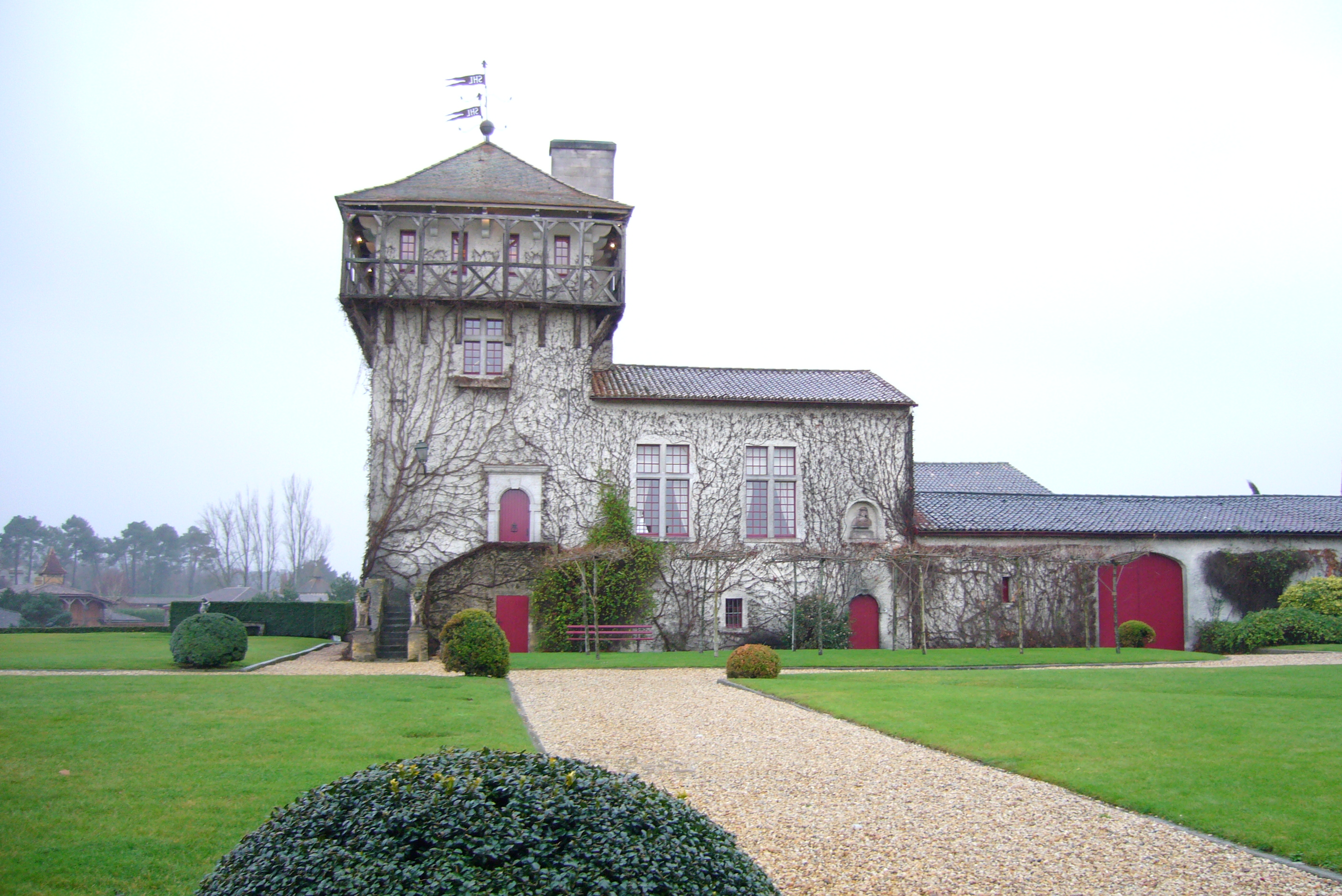
Château Smith Haut Lafitte is one of the classified wineries of Pessac-Léognan.

This part of the Graves, located just south of the city of Bordeaux, is home to the first growth estate Château Haut-Brion, as well as all the 1953 classified Graves Growths, including Château La Mission Haut-Brion and Château Laville Haut-Brion. In addition to wine production, the area is known for its crops of pine trees, and vineyards are often separated by rows of forest trees. The soil of Pessac-Léognan is composed of gravel terraces with sediments from different geological eras.

Pessac-Léognan received appellation status in 1987, and produces both red and white wines. All of the estates named in the 1959 Graves classification are located in this appellation. Cabernet Sauvignon is the dominant grape variety, followed by Merlot and the white wine grapes Sauvignon blanc and Sémillon. The white wines of this area are barrel fermented and aged on their lees.

=== Sauternes AOC and Barsac AOC ===
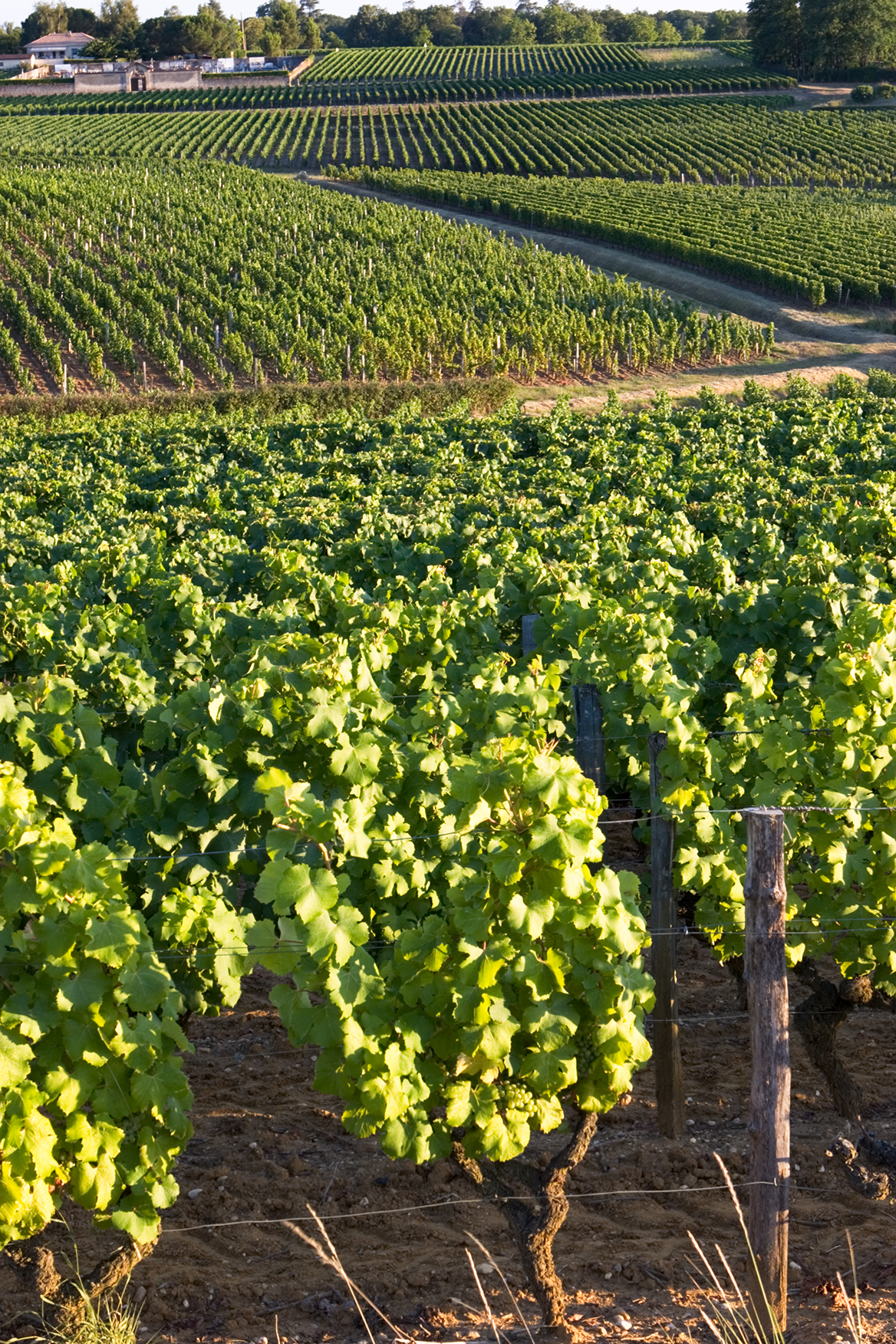
A Sauternes vineyard

Sauternes is an appellation of Graves known for its intensely sweet, white, dessert wines such as the Premier Cru Supérieur classified Château d'Yquem.

Wines produced in the commune of Barsac, such as Premiers Crus Château Climens and Château Coutet, are allowed to be labeled with the commune name (as Barsac AOC) or with Sauternes. The intense sweetness is the result of the grapes being affected by Botrytis cinerea, a fungus commonly known as noble rot. In the autumn, the Ciron river produces mist that descends upon the area and persists until after dawn. These conditions are conducive to the growth of the fungus, which desiccates the grape and concentrates the sugars inside. The three main grapes are of this are Sémillon, Sauvignon blanc and Muscadelle.

Production costs for this area's botrytized wines are comparatively high. The evaporation and fungus affections produces low yields, which are one fifth to one sixth of that in other Bordeaux regions. The berries are normally harvested individually from the bunch, with pickers going through the vineyards several times between September and November to ensure the berries are picked at their optimal points. The wine is then fermented in small oak barrels, further adding to the cost. Even with half bottles of the First Growths priced at several hundred dollars, these wines still have difficulties turning a profit, and in the mid 20th century, a string of bad vintages drove many growers in the region out of business.

=== Cérons AOC ===
Cérons AOC is an appellation for sweet white wines of similar style as Sauternes but with no producers as noted as the classified Sauternes properties and therefore with lower prices. On the other hand, the wines are considered superior to those of Graves Supérieures AOC of which Cérons effectively is an enclave.

== See also ==
- List of vins de primeur
- Bordeaux wine
- Bordeaux wine regions
