= Cacolac =

Milk-based drink

- Region of origin: Bordeaux
- Introduced: 1954

Cacolac is a milk-based drink created in 1954 in Bordeaux, France, by the Lanneluc and Lauseig families. Throughout France, it is available in about 70% of all cafés, hotels, and restaurants. Since 1978, it has also been available in grocery stores in glass bottles and cans.

== Producer ==
The food company Cacolac is still directed by the family of the creators. It employs twenty-eight people, and the manufacturing plant has been located in Léognan, in the Gironde department in Aquitaine since 2000. It also distributes the products by itself.

== Recipe ==
Contrary to popular belief, Cacolac is simply chocolate milk, although it has a different flavor to it. The nutritional value of this drink is low, and it can be drunk either hot or cold.

== Marketing ==
The company was offered free publicity almost daily for some time. In fact, the puppet footballer Jean-Pierre Papin of Les Guignols was presented as a big fan of the drink. Danone had tried to market the fresh version of the drink by investing heavily in advertising campaigns, but had little success.
