= Château Malartic-Lagravière =

Coordinates: 44.7223°N 0.6026°W

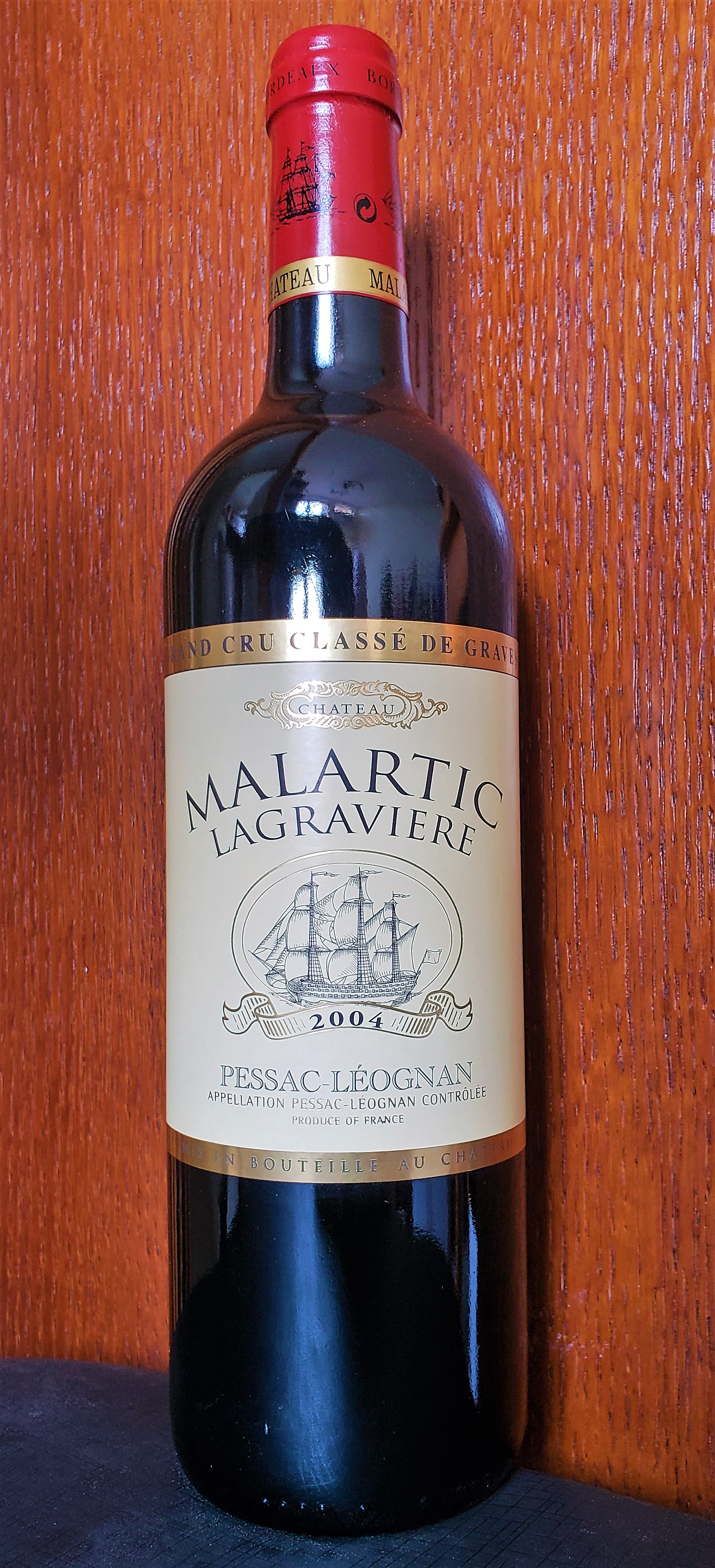
Grand Vin 2004

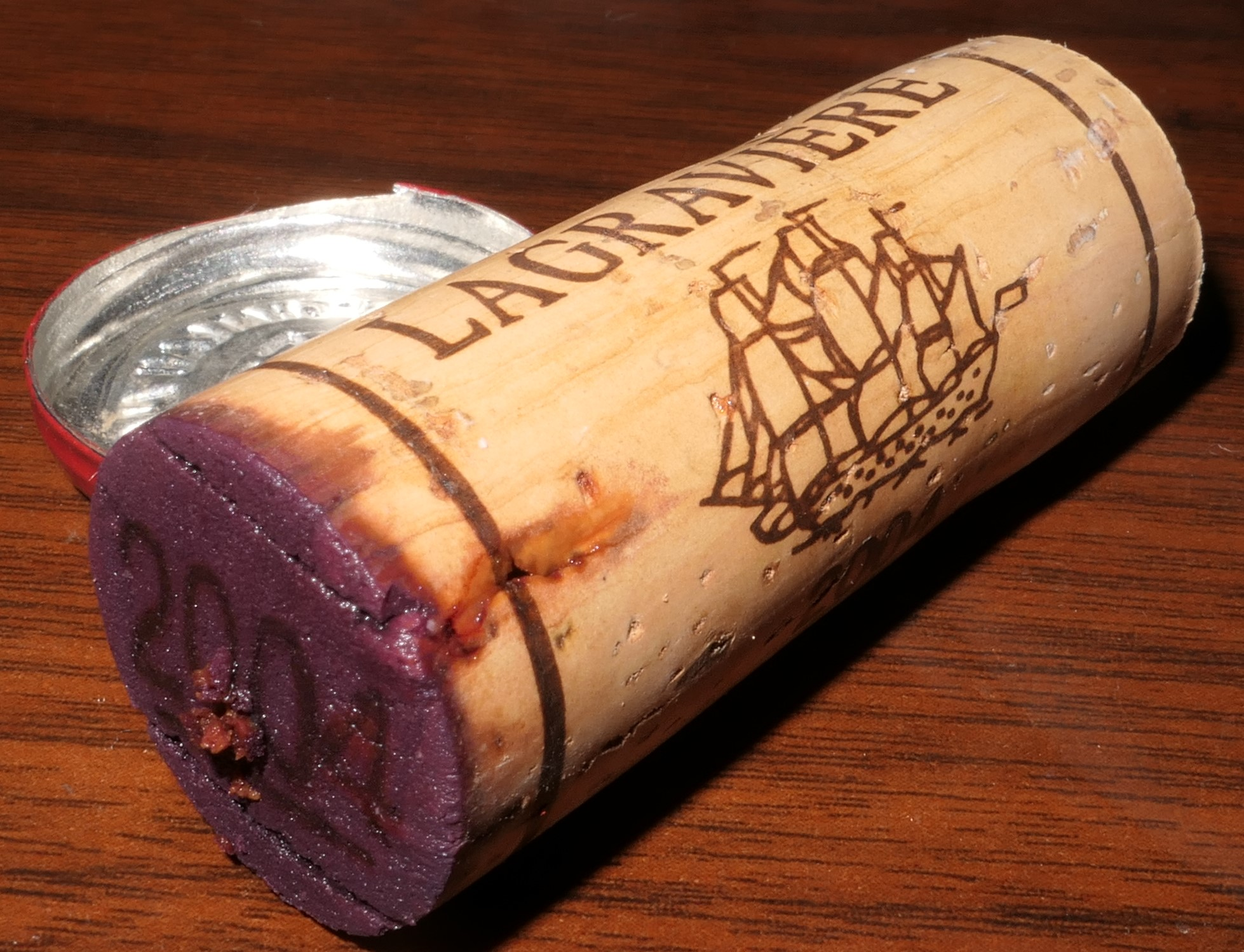
Fresh Cork

Château Malartic-Lagravière, originally Domaine de Lagravière, is a Bordeaux wine from the Pessac-Léognan appellation, ranked among the Crus Classés for red and white wine in the Classification of Graves wine of 1953 and 1959. The winery and vineyards are located south of the city of Bordeaux, in the commune of Léognan.

== History ==
The Domaine de Lagravière was bought in 1803 by Pierre de Malartic whose uncle, Comte de Malartic through battles against the British in Canada and Mauritius brought fame to the name and the maritime theme which is associated with this estate. The Malartic name was not applied to the estate until after 1850 however.

The estate has belonged to the Bonnie family since 1997, with oenologists Michel Rolland and Athanase Fakorellis as consultants.

== Production ==
From a property of 47 hectares (120 acres), the vineyard area consists of 41 hectares (100 acres) of the red grape varieties 45% Cabernet Sauvignon, 45% Merlot, with 8% Cabernet Franc and 2% Petit Verdot, and 6 hectares (15 acres) of the white grape varieties 80% Sauvignon blanc and 20% Sémillon.

The Grand vin, Château Malartic-Lagravière, is annually produced in 16,000 cases of the red wine and 2,500 cases of the dry white. There are also red and white second wines, Sillage de Malartic, and a rosé, Le Rosé de Malartic.
