= Château Carbonnieux =

Coordinates: 44.74533°N 0.56894°W

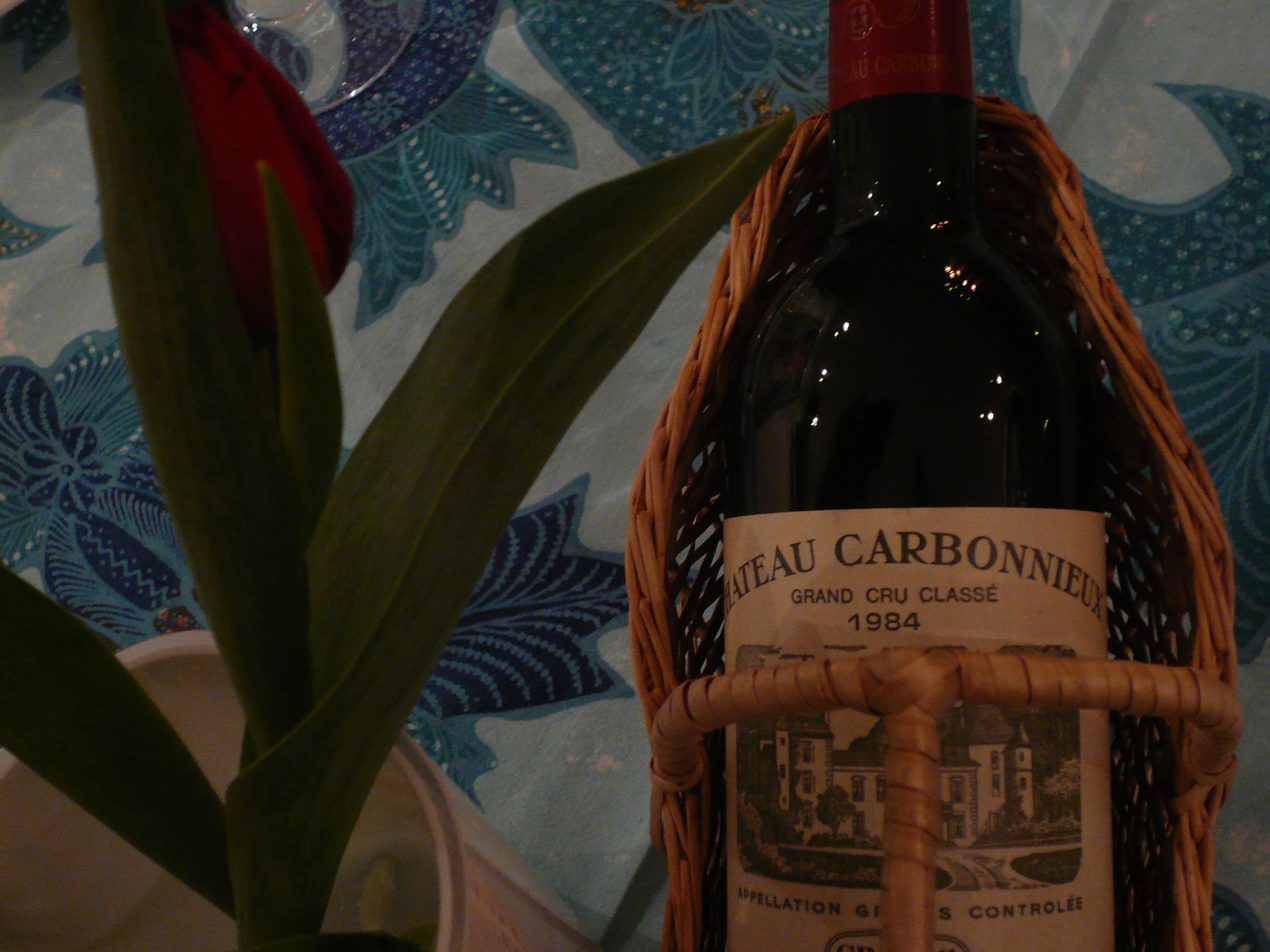
Château Carbonnieux in a presentation basket.

Château Carbonnieux is a Bordeaux wine estate located in the Pessac-Léognan region of the Graves. The estate was one of the first estates included in the Graves wine classification and is known for its red and white wine production.

Chateau Carbonnieux has two Graves classifications for both its red and white wines. These are Grand Cru Classé and Grand Vin de Graves. The red wines are the Bordeaux blend of Cabernet Sauvignon, Merlot and Cabernet Franc. Petit Verdot is used for structure for the Grand Vin but not for the Grand Cru Classé. The white wine is a blend of Sauvignon Blanc and Semillon.

Historically, Chateau Carbonnieux was better known for its white wines than its reds.

== Wines ==
In addition to the main wines, Carbonnieux produces two second wines: La Croix de Carbonnieux, made from the same plots as the grand vin; and Château Tour Léognan, made from young vines.
