= Cadaujac =

- Commune
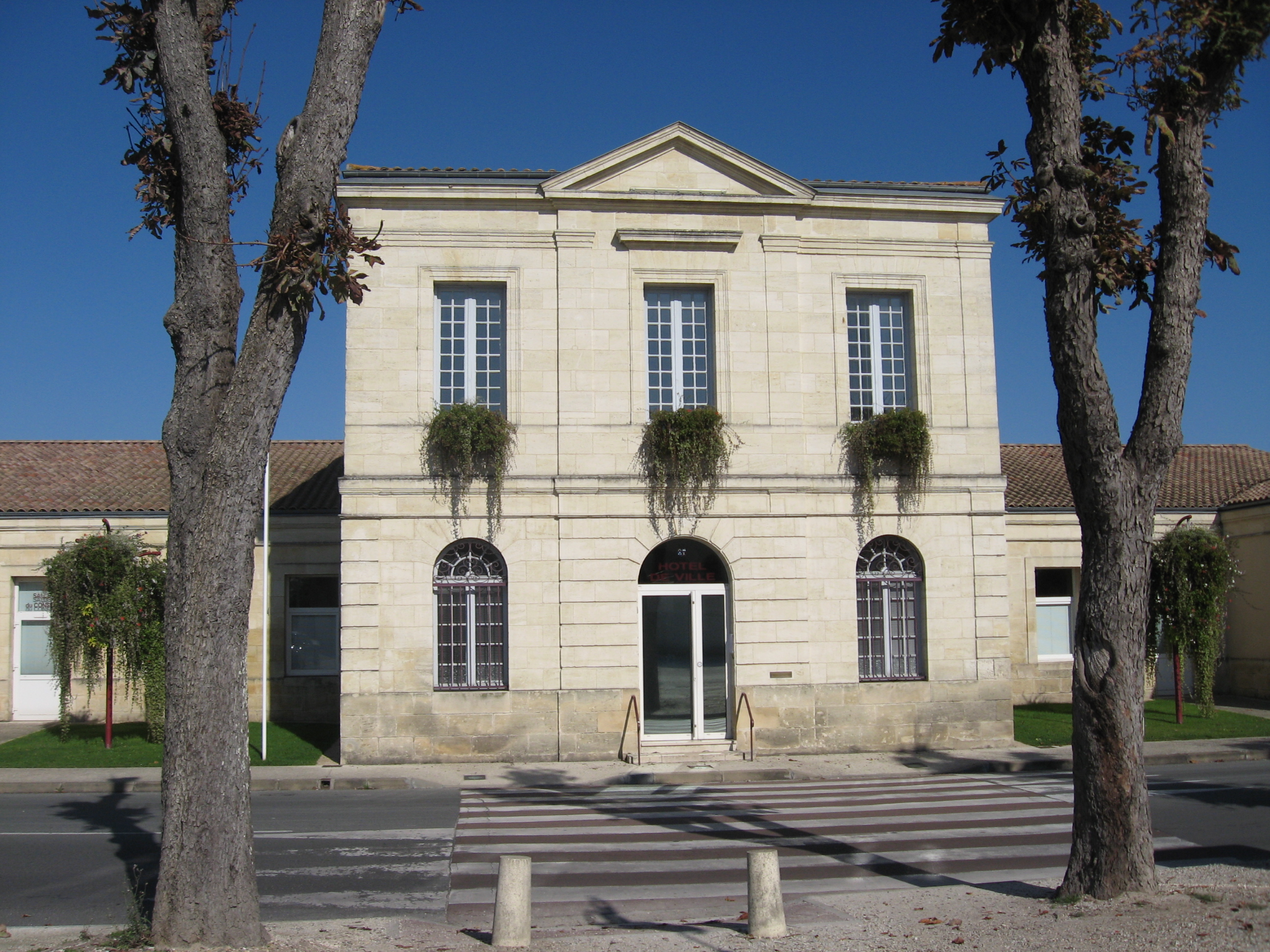
- Town hall

- Coat of arms
- Location of Cadaujac
- Location within France Location within Nouvelle-Aquitaine
- Coordinates: 44°45′23″N 0°31′44″W
- Country: France
- Region: Nouvelle-Aquitaine
- Department: Gironde
- Arrondissement: Bordeaux
- Canton: La Brède
- Intercommunality: Montesquieu

Government
  - Mayor (2020–2026): Francis Gazeau
- Area^{1}: 15.33 km^{2} (5.92 sq mi)
- Elevation: 11 m (36 ft)
- Highest elevation: 36 m (118 ft)
- Lowest elevation: 3 m (9.8 ft)
- Population (2023): 6,909
  - Density: 450.7/km^{2} (1,167/sq mi)
- Time zone: UTC+01:00 (CET)
  - Summer (DST): UTC+02:00 (CEST)
- INSEE/Postal code: 33080 /33140
- ^{1} French Land Register data, which excludes lakes, ponds, glaciers > 1 km^{2} (0.386 sq mi or 247 acres) and river estuaries.

Cadaujac (French pronunciation: [kadoʒak]) is a commune in the Gironde department in Nouvelle-Aquitaine in southwestern France. Cadaujac station has rail connections to Langon and Bordeaux.

== Population ==
Historical population
Year	Pop.	±% p.a.
1968	2,152	—
1975	2,537	+2.38%
1982	2,823	+1.54%
1990	4,137	+4.89%
1999	4,408	+0.71%
2007	4,716	+0.85%
2012	5,429	+2.86%
2017	6,097	+2.35%
2023	6,909	+2.11%
Source: INSEE

== International relations ==
Twinned with Tramore, County Waterford, Ireland

== See also ==
- Communes of the Gironde department
