= Martillac =

- Commune
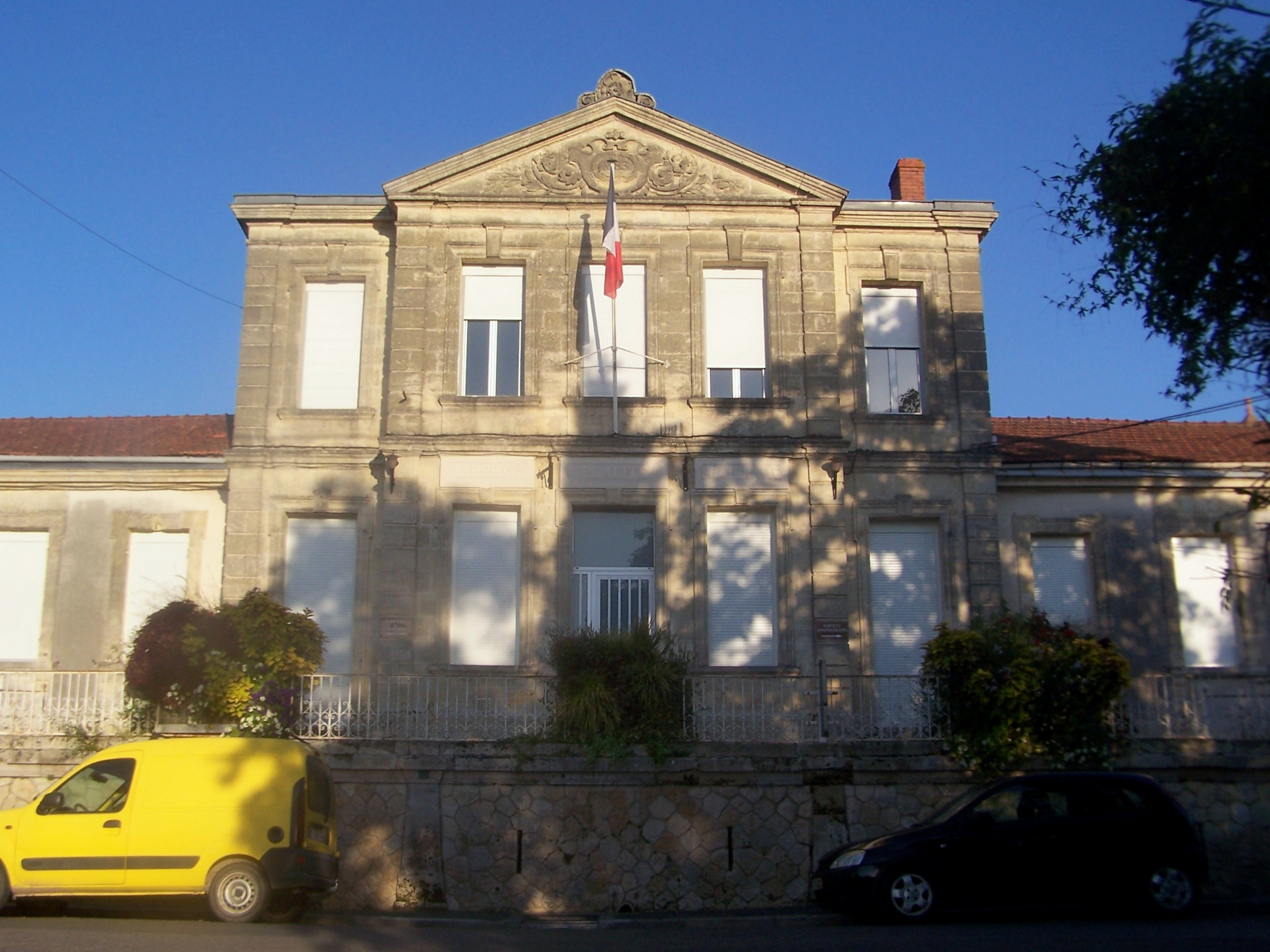
- The town hall in Martillac

- Coat of arms
- Location of Martillac
- Location within France Location within Nouvelle-Aquitaine
- Coordinates: 44°42′51″N 0°32′32″W
- Country: France
- Region: Nouvelle-Aquitaine
- Department: Gironde
- Arrondissement: Bordeaux
- Canton: La Brède
- Intercommunality: Montesquieu

Government
  - Mayor (2020–2026): Dominique Claverie
- Area^{1}: 17.09 km^{2} (6.60 sq mi)
- Elevation: 45 m (148 ft)
- Highest elevation: 59 m (194 ft)
- Lowest elevation: 8 m (26 ft)
- Population (2023): 3,659
  - Density: 214.1/km^{2} (554.5/sq mi)
- Time zone: UTC+01:00 (CET)
  - Summer (DST): UTC+02:00 (CEST)
- INSEE/Postal code: 33274 /33650
- ^{1} French Land Register data, which excludes lakes, ponds, glaciers > 1 km^{2} (0.386 sq mi or 247 acres) and river estuaries.

Martillac (French pronunciation: [maʁtijak]; Occitan: Martilhac) is a commune in the Gironde department in Nouvelle-Aquitaine in southwestern France.

== Population ==
Historical population
Year	Pop.	±% p.a.
1968	965	—
1975	1,090	+1.76%
1982	1,309	+2.65%
1990	1,652	+2.95%
1999	2,020	+2.26%
2007	2,293	+1.60%
2012	2,770	+3.85%
2017	3,067	+2.06%
2023	3,659	+2.99%
Source: INSEE

== See also ==
- Communes of the Gironde department
