= Sémillon =

Variety of grape

- Grape (Vitis)
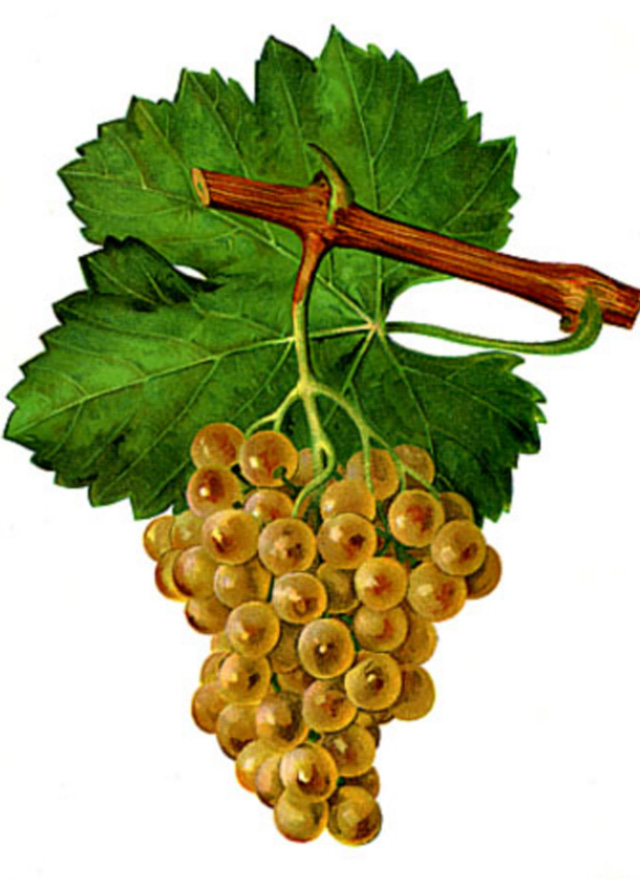
- Sémillon in Viala and Vermorel
- Color of berry skin: Blanc
- Also called: Blanc doux, Colombier, Malaga, Groendruif, Wyndruif, Hunter River Riesling
- Origin: West of France
- Notable regions: France, Australia, Chile, Argentina, South Africa, New Zealand, etc.
- Hazards: Sunburn, Botrytis cinerea
- VIVC number: 11480

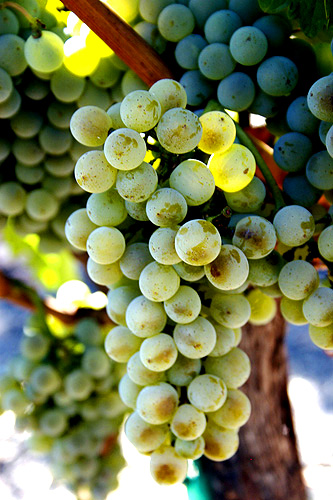
Ripe Sémillon grapes growing at a winery in the Napa Valley AVA.

Sémillon (French pronunciation: [semijɔ̃]) is a golden-skinned grape used to make dry and sweet white wines, mostly in France and Australia. Its thin skin and susceptibility to botrytis make it dominate the sweet wine region Sauternes AOC and Barsac AOC.

== History ==
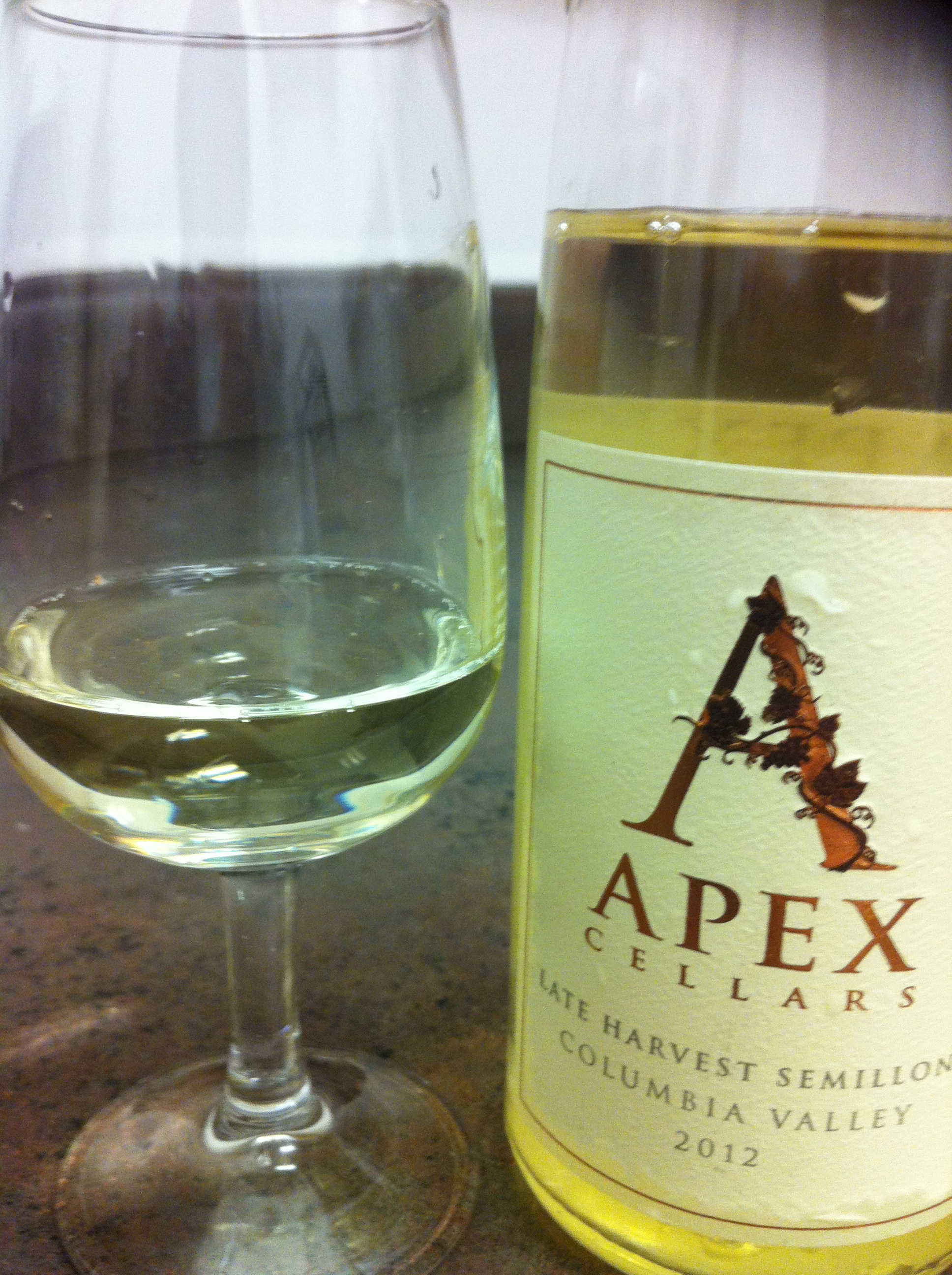
A Late-Harvest Semillon from Washington State.

The Sémillon grape is native to the Bordeaux region. It was known as Sémillon de Saint-Émilion in 1736, while Sémillon also resembles the local pronunciation of the town's name ([semi'ʎuŋ]). It first arrived in Australia in the early 19th century and by the 1820s the grape covered over 90% of South Africa's vineyards, where it was known as Wyndruif, meaning "wine grape". It was once considered to be the most planted grape in the world, although this is no longer the case. In the 1950s, Chile's vineyards were made up of over 75% Sémillon. Today, it accounts for just 1% of South African Cape vines.

== Viticulture ==
Sémillon, which is relatively easy to cultivate, consistently produces six to eight tons of grapes per acre from its vigorous vines. It is fairly resistant to disease, except for rot. The grape ripens early, when, in warmer climates, it acquires a pinkish hue. Since the grape has a thin skin, there is also a risk of sunburn in hotter climates; it is best suited to areas with sunny days and cool nights.

Sémillon wines are rather heavy, with low acidity and an almost oily texture. It has a high yield and wines based on it can age a long time. Along with Sauvignon blanc and Muscadelle, Sémillon is one of only three approved white wine varieties in the Bordeaux region.

The grape is also key to the production of sweet wines such as Sauternes. For the grapes to be used for sweet wine production, they need to have been affected by Botrytis (also known as "noble rot"). This fungus dries out the grapes, thus concentrating the sugar and flavours in the grape berry.

== Regional production ==
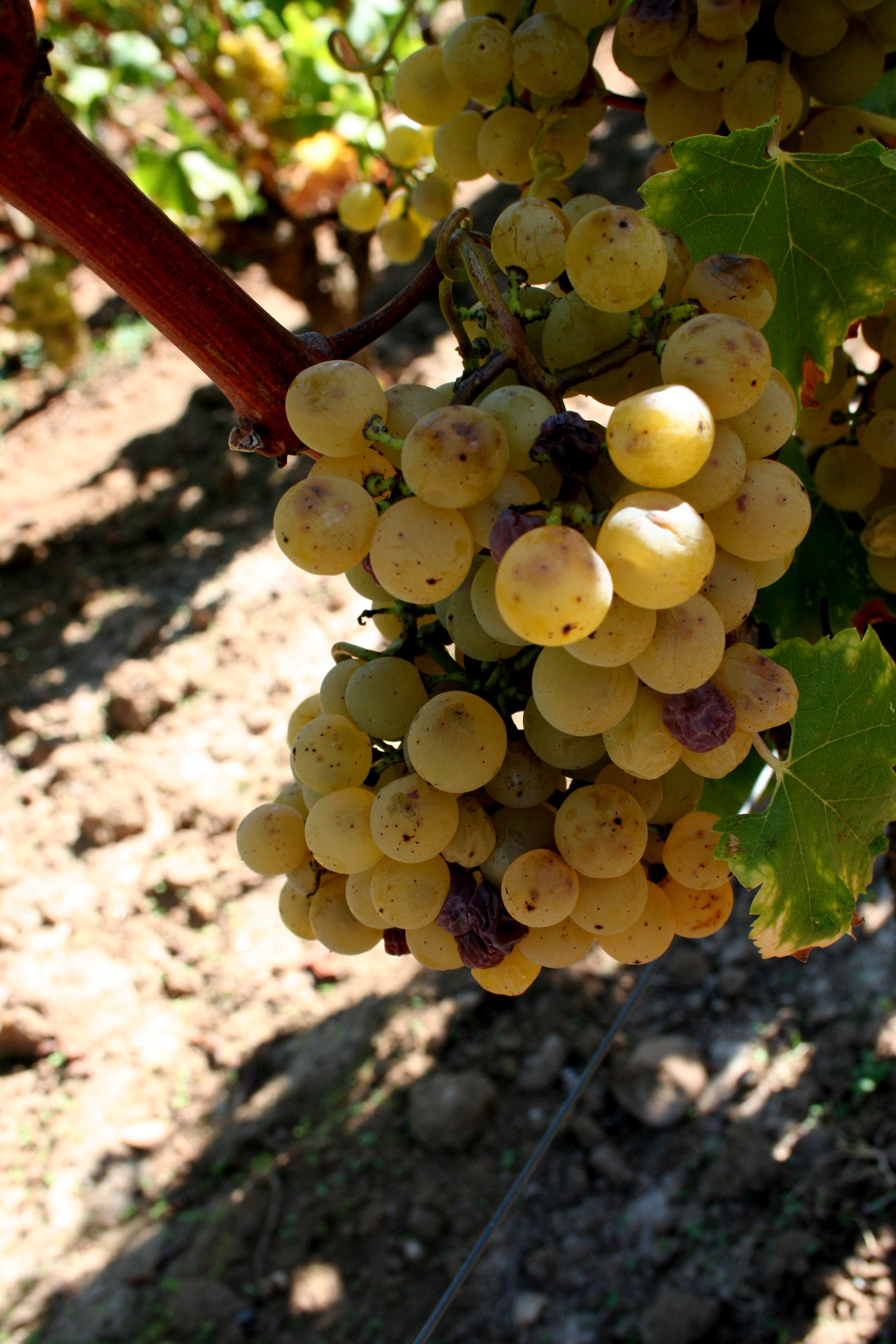
Semillon showing signs of developing noble rot in the Barsac region of Bordeaux.

Sémillon is an important cultivar in two significant wine producing countries. In France, Sémillon is the preeminent white grape in the Bordeaux wine regions. The grape has also found a home in Australia; whereas today the country's major white varieties are Chardonnay and Sauvignon blanc, early in the country's viticultural development it was Sémillon, at that time mislabeled as Riesling, that was the most significant white variety.

=== France ===
In France, the Sémillon grape is grown mostly in Bordeaux where it is blended with Sauvignon blanc and Muscadelle. When dry, it is referred to as Bordeaux blanc and is permitted to be made in the appellations of Pessac-Léognan, Graves, Entre-Deux-Mers and other less-renowned regions. In this form, Sémillon is generally a minor constituent in the blend. However, when used to make the sweet white wines of Bordeaux (such as those from Sauternes, Barsac and Cérons) it is often the dominant variety. In such wines the vine is exposed to the "noble rot" of Botrytis cinerea which consumes the water content of the fruit, concentrating the sugar present in its pulp. When attacked by Botrytis cinerea, the grapes shrivel and the acid and sugar levels are intensified.

Due to the declining popularity of the grape variety, fewer clones are cultivated in nurseries causing producers to project a future shortage of quality wine. In 2008, 17 Bordeaux wine producers, including Château d'Yquem, Château Olivier, Château Suduiraut and Château La Tour Blanche, formed an association to grow their own clones.

=== Australia ===
Sémillon is widely grown in Australia, particularly in the Hunter Valley north of Sydney, where for a long time it was known as "Hunter River Riesling". Four styles of Sémillon-based wines are made there:

- a commercial style, often blended with Chardonnay or Sauvignon blanc;
- a sweet style, after that of Sauternes;
- a complex, minerally, early picked style which has great longevity;
- and an equally high quality dry style, which can be released soon after vintage as a vat- or bottle-aged example.

The latter two styles were pioneered by Lindemans, Tulloch, McWilliam's Elizabeth, Drayton's and Tyrrell's, and are considered unique to Australia.

Most examples of these bottle-aged Hunter Semillons exhibit a buttercup-yellow colour, burnt toast or honey characteristics on the nose and excellent complex flavours on the palate, with a long finish and soft acid. Young Hunter Valley semillon is almost always a dry wine, usually exhibiting citrus flavours of lemon, lime or green apple. Cooler-year Hunter Semillons seem to be the most highly sought after, with some of the 1974 and 1977 vintages still drinking well. The newer, fruit-accentuated styles are championed by the likes of Iain Riggs at Brokenwood Wines and The Rothbury Estate.

Sémillon is also finding favour with Australian producers outside the Hunter Valley in the Barossa Valley and Margaret River regions. The Adelaide Hills is becoming a flourishing region for Semillon, with the cooler climate producing some wines of great complexity. Vineyards such as Amadio and Paracombe produce some premium blends of the classical style.

=== South Africa ===
Semillon is one of the Cape's true heritage white varietals, with origins as early as the 17th century (when it became known as Groendruif which translates as Green grape), the grape variety accounted for more than 90% of plantings in the first half of the 19th century. While South African Semillon has not quite taken off as a serious commercial category in single varietal form in the modern era, there are stunning wines being made from especially older vineyards (some of them centurions). More often, the variety plays a role in beefing up the volume of Sauvignon blancs.

The best South African Semillons have juicy fruit with often an ethereal-like citrus perfume, fine texture, herbal interest and manage to marry the intensity of flavour with finesse.

A red mutation of Semillon is today rarely found, although it was once quite common in South Africa. Semillon Rouge is also a synonym for Merlot.

=== Other regions ===
Outside of these regions, however, Sémillon is unpopular and often criticised for lack of complexity and intensity. As such, plantings have decreased over the last century. As referenced above, the grape can still be found in South Africa and Chile. The latter is reputed to have the largest plantings of this grape, although the number of acres planted with Sémillon fluctuates often. California growers plant Sémillon primarily to blend it with Sauvignon blanc. There are some wineries in the Washington State that have produced Sémillon as a varietal wine since the early 1980s; others actively produce Sémillon for Ice Wine and Late Harvest wines. At least one winery in Idaho grows and produces a varietal offering and at least four vineyards in Texas are growing Sémillon. The grape is also planted in Argentina, Canada (Niagara and British Columbia) and recently in New Zealand.

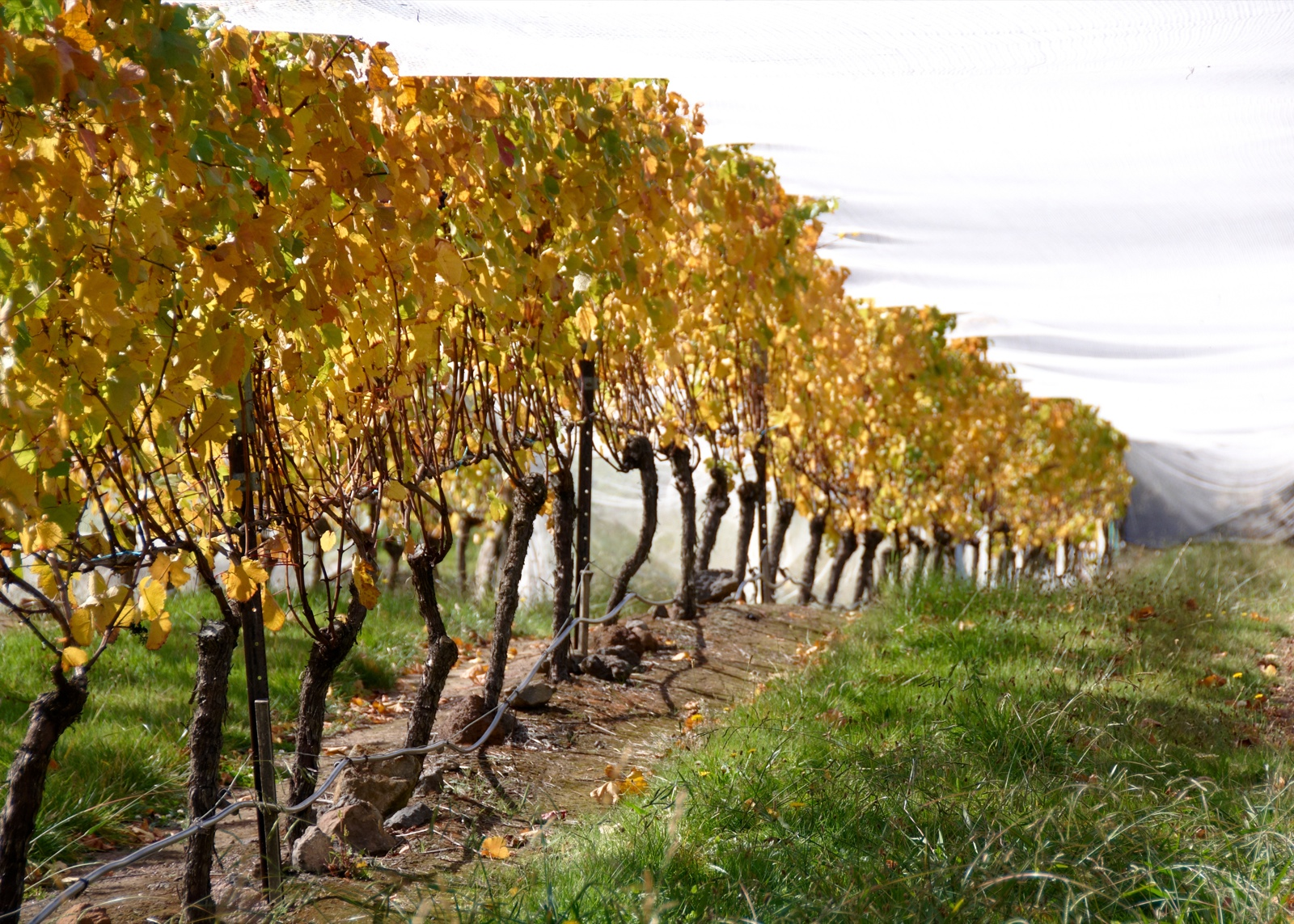
Sémillon vines growing in Gisborne, New Zealand

== See also ==
- International variety
