= First Growth =

Classification of wines

First Growth (French: Premier Cru) status is a classification of wines primarily from the Bordeaux region of France.

The wines considered “best of the best” are assigned the rank of Premier Cru, with only five wines, Château Lafite Rothschild, Château Margaux, Château Haut-Brion, Château Latour, and Château Mouton Rothschild rated “First Growth”.

== History ==
=== Bordeaux reds ===
The need for a classification of the best Bordeaux wines arose from the 1855 Exposition Universelle de Paris. The result was the Bordeaux Wine Official Classification of 1855, a list of the top ranked wines, named the Grand Crus Classés (Great Classified Growths). With several thousand Chateaux producing their wines in Bordeaux, to be classified was to carry a mark of high prestige.

Within the Grand Cru Classé list, wines were further ranked and placed in one of five divisions. The best of the best wines were assigned the highest rank of Premier Cru; only four wines, Château Latour, Château Lafite Rothschild, Château Margaux and Château Haut-Brion were deemed worthy. Of all the 61 great classified wines, all but one came from the Médoc region. The exception was the premier cru Château Haut-Brion, produced in Graves.

The 1855 list remained unchanged for over a hundred years until finally Mouton Rothschild was promoted to Premier Cru status in 1973, after decades of relentless lobbying by its powerful owner, Baron Philippe de Rothschild. Of lesser importance, in 1988 the premier cru Château Haut-Brion was changed in appellation from Graves to Pessac-Leognan to represent apparent changes in soil structure caused by the urbanisation of areas surrounding Bordeaux.

=== Bordeaux sweet wines ===
Also in 1855, 21 of the best sweet wines from Bordeaux were classified as Grand Crus Classés in a separate list. In the original classification, nine wines (primarily from the Sauternes and Barsac regions) were classed as Premier Cru, while 11 were assigned the lower (though still prestigious) rank of Deuxième Cru (Second Growth). One wine (Château d'Yquem) was considered so great it was granted a special Premier Cru Supérieur classification.

=== Other classification schemes in Bordeaux ===
With the exception of Château Haut-Brion from Graves, the 1855 Classification did not include producers in the regions of Graves, Saint-Émilion and Pomerol. For details on their own classification schemes, see their sections below.

=== Other classification schemes in France ===
Burgundy maintains its own classification scheme based on specific appellations. Although the terminology used is similar, the classification hierarchy is different and also attaches to the vineyards themselves. The most-highly rated vineyards are graded as Grand Cru, while those at the next level are classified as Premier Cru.

== First Growth wines today ==
=== Bordeaux reds ===
==== Premier Grand Cru ====
- Château Lafite Rothschild Médoc (Pauillac)
- Château Margaux Médoc (Margaux)
- Château Latour Médoc (Pauillac)
- Château Haut-Brion Graves (Pessac-Leognan)
- Château Mouton-Rothschild Médoc (Pauillac)

=== Bordeaux sweet wines ===
==== Premier Cru Supérieur ====
- Château d'Yquem (Sauternes)

==== Premier Cru ====
- Château La Tour Blanche, Bommes (Sauternes)
- Château Lafaurie-Peyraguey, Bommes (Sauternes)
- Château Clos Haut-Peyraguey, Bommes (Sauternes)
- Château de Rayne-Vigneau, Bommes (Sauternes)
- Château Suduiraut, Preignac (Sauternes)
- Château Coutet, Barsac
- Château Climens, Barsac
- Château Guiraud, Sauternes
- Château Rieussec, Fargues (Sauternes)
- Château Rabaud-Promis, Bommes (Sauternes)
- Château Sigalas-Rabaud, Bommes (Sauternes)

The communes of Bommes, Fargues and Preignac were once separate communes but now fall into the single commune of Sauternes.

== The Graves classification ==
After the Second World War the omission of wines of Graves from the official classification was having a negative effect on the price and desirability of wines from the region. To improve marketing the region announced in 1953 its own classification of red wines and one white wine, with more white wines added in 1959. Sixteen wines were given special classification.

- Château Bouscaut (red & white)
- Château Carbonnieux (red & white)
- Château Couhins (white)
- Château Couhins-Lurton (white)
- Domaine de Chevalier (red & white)
- Château de Fieuzal (red)
- Château Haut-Bailly (red)
- Château Haut-Brion (red)
- Château La Mission Haut-Brion (red)
- Château La Tour Haut-Brion (red)
- Château Latour-Martillac (red & white)
- Château Laville Haut-Brion (white)
- Château Malartic-Lagravière (red & white)
- Château Olivier (red & white)
- Château Pape Clément (red)
- Château Smith Haut Lafitte (red)

== The Saint-Émilion classification ==
Missing from the 1855 list, the Bordeaux region of Saint-Émilion offered its own classification in 1955 to improve market demand and prices. The Classification of Saint-Émilion wine differs from the 1855 list in that it is updated approximately every ten years based on new assessments of quality. For each new release of the classification, wines may be promoted or demoted within the list. A wine may even be removed entirely, while other unclassified wines may be added. In 2006, for example, eleven wines were removed from the list, six new wines added, and two existing wines promoted to a higher division.

The Saint-Émilion Classification currently labels 15 wines as First Growths. These Premiers Grands Crus Classés, subdivided into two further classes : A (2 wines) and B (13 wines). A further 64 wines are currently classified as Grands Crus Classés.

=== Premiers Grands Crus Classés A ===
- Château Figeac
- Château Pavie

=== Premiers Grands Crus Classés B ===
- Château Beauséjour (Duffau-Lagarrosse)
- Château Beau-Séjour Bécot
- Château Bélair-Monange
- Château Canon
- Château Canon-la-Gaffelière
- Clos Fourtet
- Château Larcis Ducasse
- Château La Gaffelière
- Château Magdelaine
- Château Pavie-Macquin
- Château Troplong Mondot
- Château Trottevieille

=== Former Premier Crus Classés ===
- Château Angélus
- Château Ausone
- Château Cheval Blanc

== Pomerol ==
Pomerol has refused to create any sort of classification scheme but it has produced red wines that are among the most expensive in the world, such as Petrus.

== See also ==
- French wine
- Bordeaux wine
- Wine labels
- Second wine
