= Aaron Pott =

American winemaker

- Born: Aaron Pott; October 18, 1966 (age 59); Eugene, Oregon
- Education: University of California, Davis
- Occupation: Winemaker
- Known for: Winemaking; Napa Valley wines
- Spouse: Claire Pott
- Children: 2
- Website: Pottwine.com

Aaron Pott is an American winemaker known for his work in both California and France. He has held winemaking and leadership roles at wineries in Napa Valley and Saint-Émilion and is the co-founder of Pott Wine.

== Early life and education ==
Pott developed an early interest in wine during his youth, which led him to pursue formal studies in oenology. He attended the University of California, Davis, where he studied winemaking and gained practical experience working in the research laboratory at the Robert Mondavi Winery. He later continued his education in France, earning a master's degree in viticulture from the Université de Bourgogne in Dijon.

== Career ==
Following his graduation, Pott began his professional career as an assistant winemaker at Newton Vineyard in Napa Valley, where he worked under winemaker John Kongsgaard. During this time, he was introduced to French consultant Michel Rolland.

Pott subsequently moved to Saint-Émilion, where he became winemaker at Château Troplong-Mondot, a Premier Grand Cru Classé estate. After approximately one year, he joined Château La Tour Figeac, also a Grand Cru Classé estate, where he served as winemaker and general manager for five years.

After six years in France, Pott returned to the United States and joined Beringer Wine Estates in Napa Valley as a winemaker. He collaborated with European winemakers, including Jean-Louis Mandrau and André Porcheret.

In 2004, Pott was appointed winemaker and general manager at Quintessa Estate in Napa Valley.

== Pott Wine and consulting ==
In 2007, Pott co-founded Pott Wine with his wife, Claire Pott. The Napa Valley-based label produces wines sourced in part from the couple’s vineyard property on Mount Veeder. He also established Huis Clos Consulting, through which he has advised a number of Napa Valley producers.

His consulting clients have included Blackbird Vineyards, Seven Stones Winery, Greer Wines, Perliss Vineyards, St. Helena Winery, and Fe Vineyards.

== Other ventures ==
In 2024, Pott teamed up with Napa Valley vintner Stephanie Honig to create Missing Thorn, a premium de-alcoholized wine.

== Personal life ==
Pott lives in Napa Valley with his wife, Claire, and their two children, Tosca and Isolde Pott.

== Awards ==
- 2012, Winemaker of the Year, Food & Wine
