= Château La Tour Figeac =

Bordeaux wine estate in France

Château La Tour Figeac is a Bordeaux wine estate in the appellation Saint-Émilion, ranked Grand cru classé in the Classification of Saint-Émilion wine, and is currently owned by the Rettenmaier family. It is situated between Château Cheval Blanc and Château Figeac near the border to Pomerol.

== History ==
Until 1879, this property was a part of the Figeac estate, when a 37-hectare (91-acre) section was bought by a M. Corbière. Later half the land was sold and further divided into the estates Château La Tour du Pin Figeac (Moueix) and Château La Tour du Pin Figeac (Giraud-Bélivier).

In 1973 the estate was sold by François Rapin to the Rettenmaier family, and it has been managed by Otto Maximilian Rettenmaier since 1994. Between 1994 and 1997 the wines were made by 2012 Food and Wine Magazine Winemaker of the Year Aaron Pott. The technical director is Christine Derenoncourt, with Stéphane Derenoncourt engaged as a consultant oenologist.

== Production ==
A biodynamic estate, the vineyards extend 14.5 hectares (36 acres) with a grape variety distribution of 60% Merlot and 40% Cabernet Franc.

The annual production of the Grand vin is typically at 3,300 cases, with the production of the second wine, L'Esquisse de La Tour Figeac at 1,250 cases. For the 2000 vintage, the second wine was replaced by a 100% Merlot named Cuvée M00.
