= Château Beauséjour =

Château Beauséjour was a historic estate in Saint-Émilion in the Bordeaux region of France that until 1869 formed a single property, since divided into two neighbouring wineries. A name also used elsewhere, to date Château Beauséjour may refer to:

- Château Beau-Séjour Bécot, formerly Château Beauséjour-Dr-Fagouet
- Château Beauséjour (Duffau-Lagarrosse), formerly Château Beauséjour-Duffau-Lagarrosse
- Château Beauséjour (Montagne Saint-Émilion)
