= Château Grand Corbin-Despagne =

Coordinates: 44.92312°N 0.17755°W

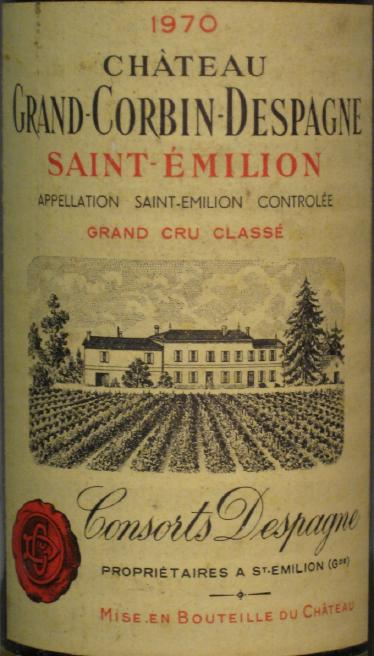
Detail of a Château Grand Corbin-Despagne 1970 label

Château Grand Corbin-Despagne is a wine from the Saint-Émilion appellation of the Bordeaux wine region of France, ranked a Grand Cru (Great Growth) in the Classification of Saint-Émilion wine. The winery is located in the northern part of the Saint-Émilion commune, close to the border of Pomerol.

A second wine is produced from the vineyard's younger vines, Petit Corbin-Despagne.

== History ==
The estate consists of the largest portion of the historic Corbin seigneury which during the Middle Ages belonged to The Black Prince and was second in importance only to Château Figeac.

With documented ties to the land from the 17th century, the Despagne family have produced wine since the 19th century. Following an expansion of the estate in 1852, a reputation of consistent quality has evolved around the Grand-Corbin-Despagne wine, receiving awards at various exhibitions in Paris before and after the beginning of the 20th century. The estate's wine is considered consistently among the best crus of Saint-Émilion's sandy glacis.

The estate is still owned and run by the Despagne family.

== Production ==
The vineyard area extends 24 hectares with grape varieties of 75% Merlot, 24% Cabernet Franc, 1% Cabernet Sauvignon and 1% Malbec. The total production of the Grand vin Château Grand Corbin-Despagne and the second wine Petit Corbin-Despagne averages between 6,500 and 8,500 cases per year.
