= Château Beauséjour (Duffau-Lagarrosse) =

Bordeaux wine from the appellation Saint-Émilion

Coordinates: 44.8923°N 0.1647°W

Château Beauséjour, formerly fully titled Château Beauséjour-Duffau-Lagarrosse, is a Bordeaux wine from the appellation Saint-Émilion, ranked Premier grand cru classé B in the Classification of Saint-Émilion wine. The winery is located in the Right Bank of France's Bordeaux wine region in the commune of Saint-Émilion, in the department Gironde.

The estate also produces the second wine Croix de Beauséjour.

== History ==
Château Beauséjour was once a vineyard cultivated by the monks of the Church of St-Martin during the Middle Ages. It was acquired by the Gerès family in the 17th century, the land then named Peycoucou. By marriage the estate came to the de Carle family, seigneurs of Figeac, and in 1787 General Jacques de Carle renamed the property to Beauséjour. When the historic estate in its entirety came to Pierre-Paulin Ducarpe, it was divided in 1869 between his two children. The son inherited the half which was sold in 1924 to Dr. Fagouet, altering the name to Château Beauséjour-Dr-Fagouet (present day Château Beau-Séjour Bécot) and his daughter who wed Doctor Duffau-Lagarrosse, received what became Château Beauséjour-Duffau-Lagarrosse.

The estate was set up as a non-trading company (société civile) in 1963, and remains owned by the Duffau-Lagarrosse family.

Nicolas Thienpont, director of winemaking at Château Pavie Macquin, is in overall charge of a 2009 effort to raise the estate's potential, assisted by consultant oenologists Michel Rolland and Stéphane Derenoncourt.

== Production ==
The vineyard area extends 7 hectares with the grape varieties of 81% Merlot, 16% Cabernet Franc and 3% Cabernet Sauvignon. Of the Grand vin, Château Beauséjour there is a total annual production of 25–30,000 bottles. The estate also produces the second wine, Croix de Beauséjour.
