= Clos de l'Oratoire =

Bordeaux wine from the appellation Saint-Émilion

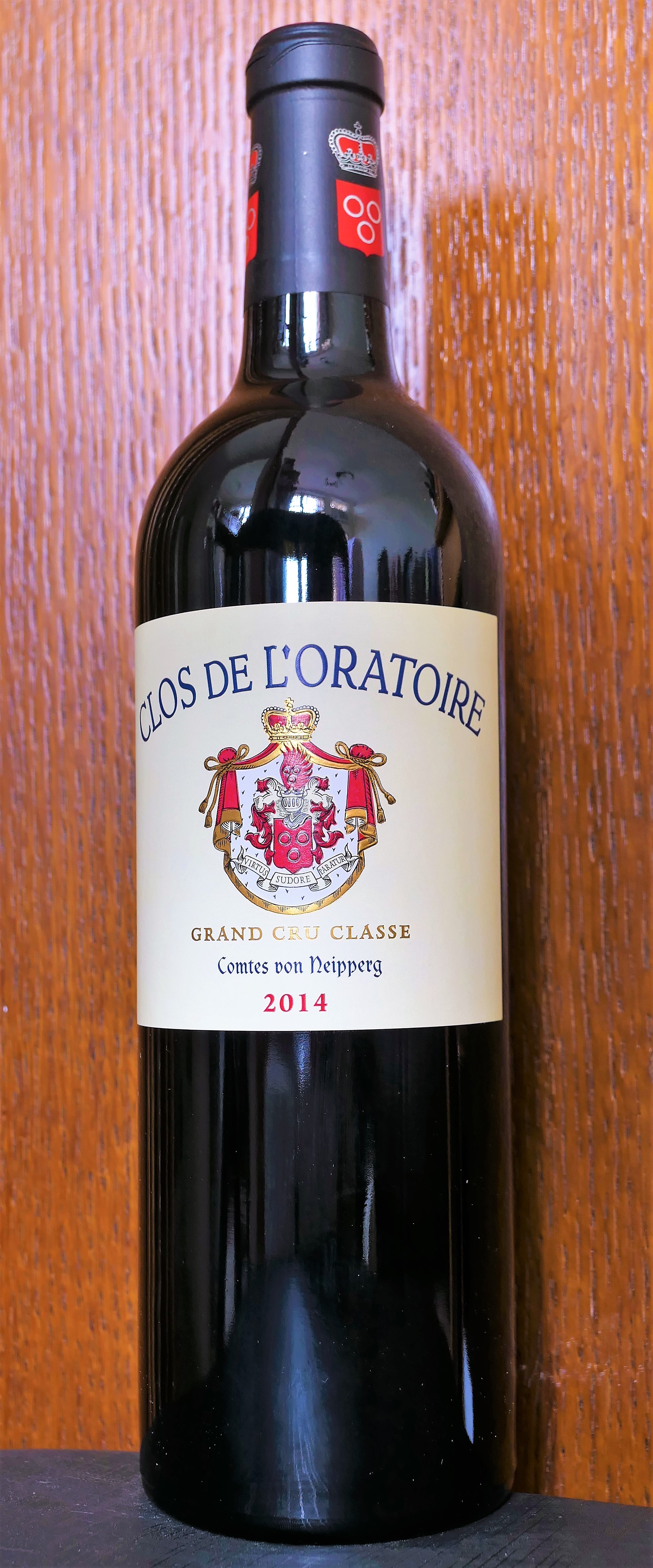
Grand Vin 2014

Clos de l'Oratoire is a Bordeaux wine from the appellation Saint-Émilion, ranked Grand cru classé in the Classification of Saint-Émilion wine. The winery is located in the Right Bank of France’s Bordeaux wine region in the commune of Saint-Émilion, in the department Gironde.

== History ==
The estate dates back to the mid-19th century, created by the Beylot family, a firm of Libourne négociants. Since its origin, this vineyard has been run in close conjunction with its larger neighbour, Peyraud which came to be Château Peyrau. Identified as having the best parcels, Clos de l'Oratoire was separated from Peyrau, and by the 1969 reclassification of Saint-Émilion, Clos de l'Oratoire was ranked Grand Cru Classé.

In 1972 shares were bought in the estates by Joseph-Hubert, Count of Neipperg, and in 1991 he passed control to his son count Stephan von Neipperg who bought the remaining 30% from the other investors. Von Neipperg's other properties include Château Canon-la-Gaffelière and the "super-cuvée" La Mondotte. The oenologist Stéphane Derenoncourt is retained as consultant.

== Production ==
The vineyard area extends 10.3 hectares with the grape varieties of 90% Merlot, 5% Cabernet Franc and 5% Cabernet Sauvignon. Of the Grand vin Clos de l'Oratoire there is a typically an annual production of 4,000 cases.
