= Château la Tour du Pin Figeac =

Château la Tour du Pin Figeac may refer to two Bordeaux wine estates in Saint-Émilion:

- Château La Tour du Pin Figeac (Moueix)
- Château La Tour du Pin Figeac (Giraud-Bélivier)
