= Château Canon (Saint-Émilion) =

Coordinates: 44.8931°N 0.1634°W

Château Canon, originally Clos St-Martin, is a Bordeaux wine from the Saint-Émilion appellation, ranked among the Premiers grands crus classés B in the Classification of Saint-Émilion wine. The winery is located just southwest of the old town of Saint-Émilion within the commune of the same name, closely neighbouring the estates such as Château Magdelaine, Château La Gaffelière and Château Ausone and has since the early 20th century been considered one of the top Saint-Émilions.

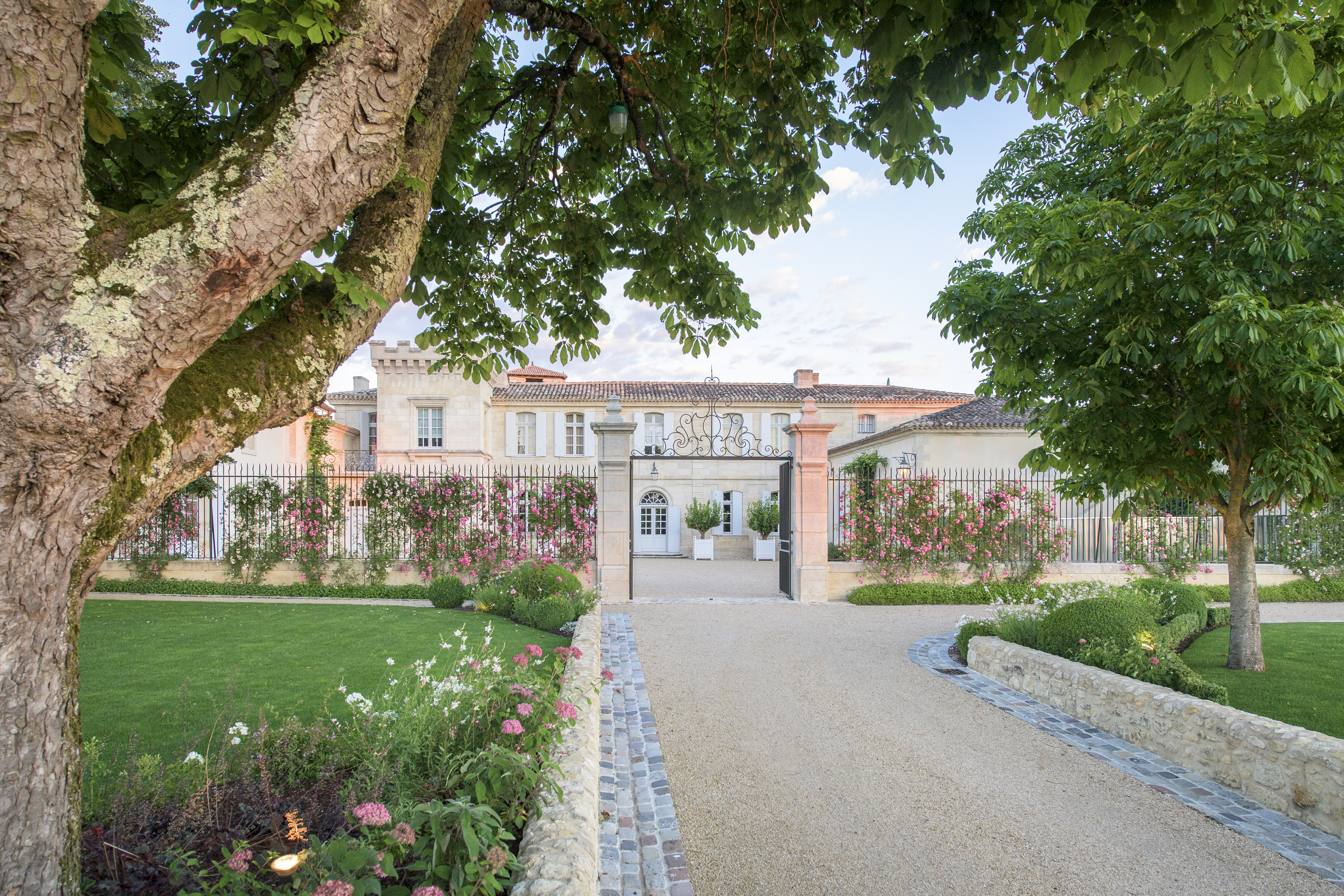
Entrance gate to chateau

== History ==
Originally a small vineyard planted around the Church of St-Martin by Jean Biès in the early 18th Century, the estate was named Clos St-Martin, sold in 1760 to Jacques Kanon, probably the source of the name Canon. A true clos, the original 12 hectare vineyard was encircled by a wall, which Kanon expanded by acquiring seven small surrounding vineyards. He sold it on in 1770 with great profit to Raymond Fontémoing, a leading Libournais négociant. Still named Clos St-Martin, the name was not altered until 1853, when the modern name was taken, to the fury of the proprietors of Château Canon of Fronsac.

Purchased by André Fournier in 1919, the estate remained in the Fournier family with success until vine disease problems arose in the early 1990s, and it was sold on to the Wertheimer family in 1996.

== Production ==
The vineyard area extends 21.5 hectares (of which 13 lie within the original clos, with grape varieties of 60% Merlot and 40% Cabernet Franc.

Chateau Canon annually produces on average 7,500 cases of the Grand vin Chateau Canon and the second wine Clos de Canon.
