= Michel Rolland =

French winemaker (1947–2026)

Michel Rolland (French pronunciation: [miʃɛl ʁɔlɑ̃]; 24 December 1947 – 20 March 2026) was a French Bordeaux-based oenologist, with hundreds of clients across 13 countries. "It is his consultancies outside France that have set him apart from all but a handful of his countrymen." It is frequently addressed that his signature style, which he helps wineries achieve, is fruit-heavy and oak-influenced, a preference shared by influential critic Robert Parker.

Rolland owned several properties in Bordeaux, including Château Bertineau Saint-Vincent in Lalande de Pomerol, Château Rolland-Maillet in Saint-Émilion, Château Fontenil in Fronsac, and Château La Grande Clotte in Lussac-Saint-Émilion as well as joint venture partnerships with Bonne Nouvelle in South Africa, Val de Flores in Argentina, Rolland Galarreta in Spain and Yacochuya (Salta) and Clos de los Siete in Argentina.

== Early life and education ==
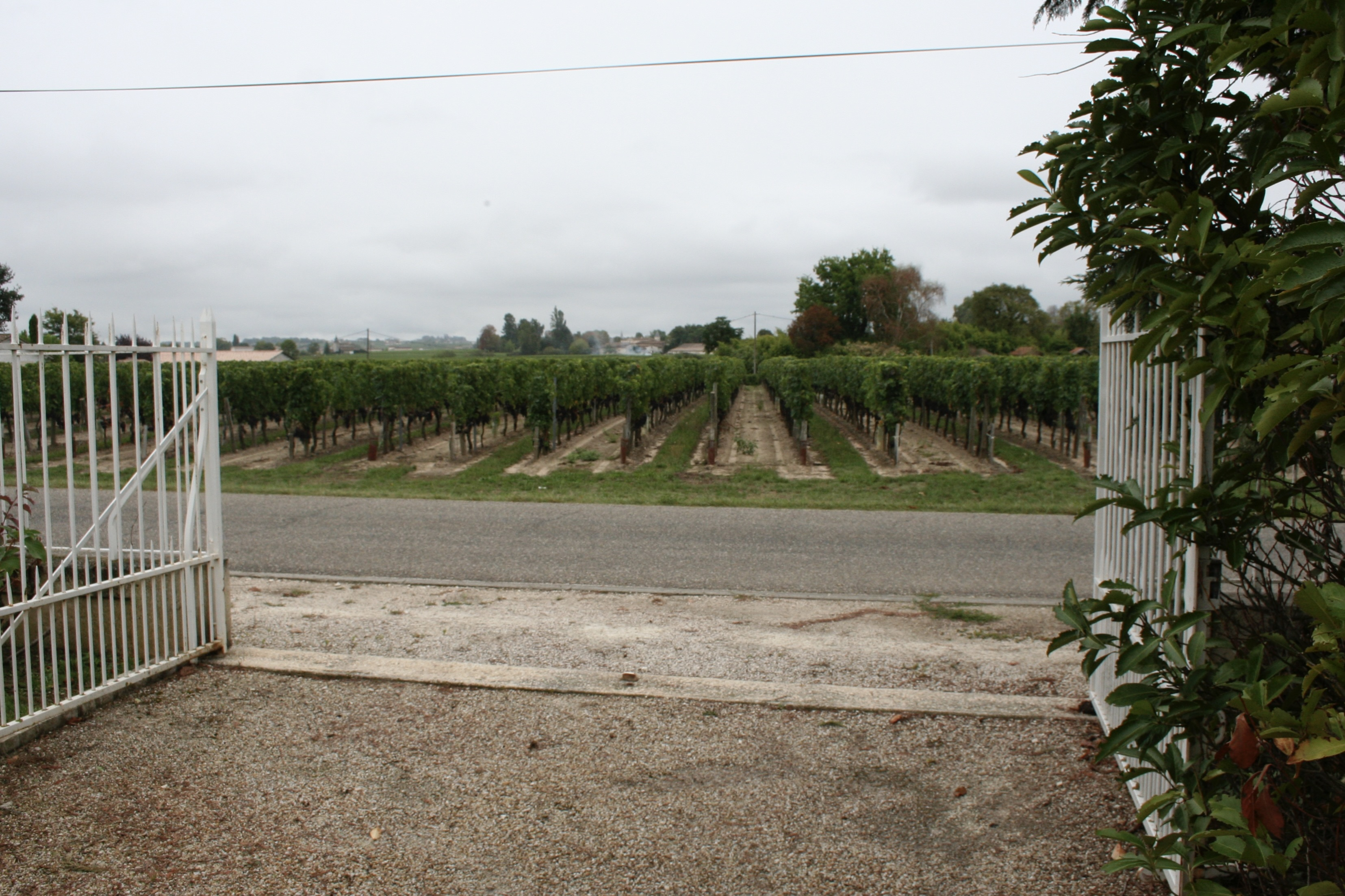
Vineyards at the Rolland family estate of Château Le Bon Pasteur in Pomerol.

Born into a wine making family in Libourne, Rolland grew up on the family's estate Château Le Bon Pasteur in Pomerol. After high school, Rolland enrolled at Tour Blanche Viticultural and Oenology school in Bordeaux with his father's encouragement. Excelling in his studies, he was one of five students chosen by director Jean-Pierre Navarre to evaluate the program's quality against that of the prestigious Bordeaux Oenology Institute. Rolland later enrolled in the institute, where he met his wife and fellow oenologist, Dany Rolland, and graduated as part of the class of 1972.

At the institute, Michel Rolland studied under the tutelage of renowned oenologists Pierre Sudraud, Pascal Ribéreau-Gayon, Jean Ribéreau-Gayon, and Émile Peynaud. Rolland has said these men were a great influence upon him and considered them the "Fathers of Modern Oenology".

== Career ==
In 1973, Rolland and his wife bought into an oenology lab on the Right Bank of Bordeaux in the town of Libourne. They took over full control of the lab in 1976 and expanded it to include tasting rooms. By 2006, the Rolland's lab employed eight full-time technicians, analyzing samples from nearly 800 wine estates in France each year. Rolland's two daughters, Stéphanie & Marie, also work at the lab.

Michel Rolland's first clients included the Bordeaux Châteaux Troplong Mondot, Angélus, and Beau-Séjour Bécot. An early setback was the loss of two Saint-Émilion first growths, Château Canon and Château La Gaffelière, due to conflict in style with the owners and Rolland. According to Rolland, the loss "calmed him down" and brought him out of an awkward stage in his early career. Twenty years later, the two chateaux returned to be part of the more than 100 wineries who employ Michel Rolland as their consultant.

In his book Noble Rot: A Bordeaux Wine Revolution, William Echikson writes that before Michel Rolland became consultant to Château Lascombes, it "produced about 500,000 bottles of mediocre wine, about half of which was sold not as Lascombes itself, but as the inferior Chevalier de Lascombes." Today, Echikson contends, that even the Chevalier (the second wine of the estate) is better than the old full-fledged Lascombes.

== Media exposure ==
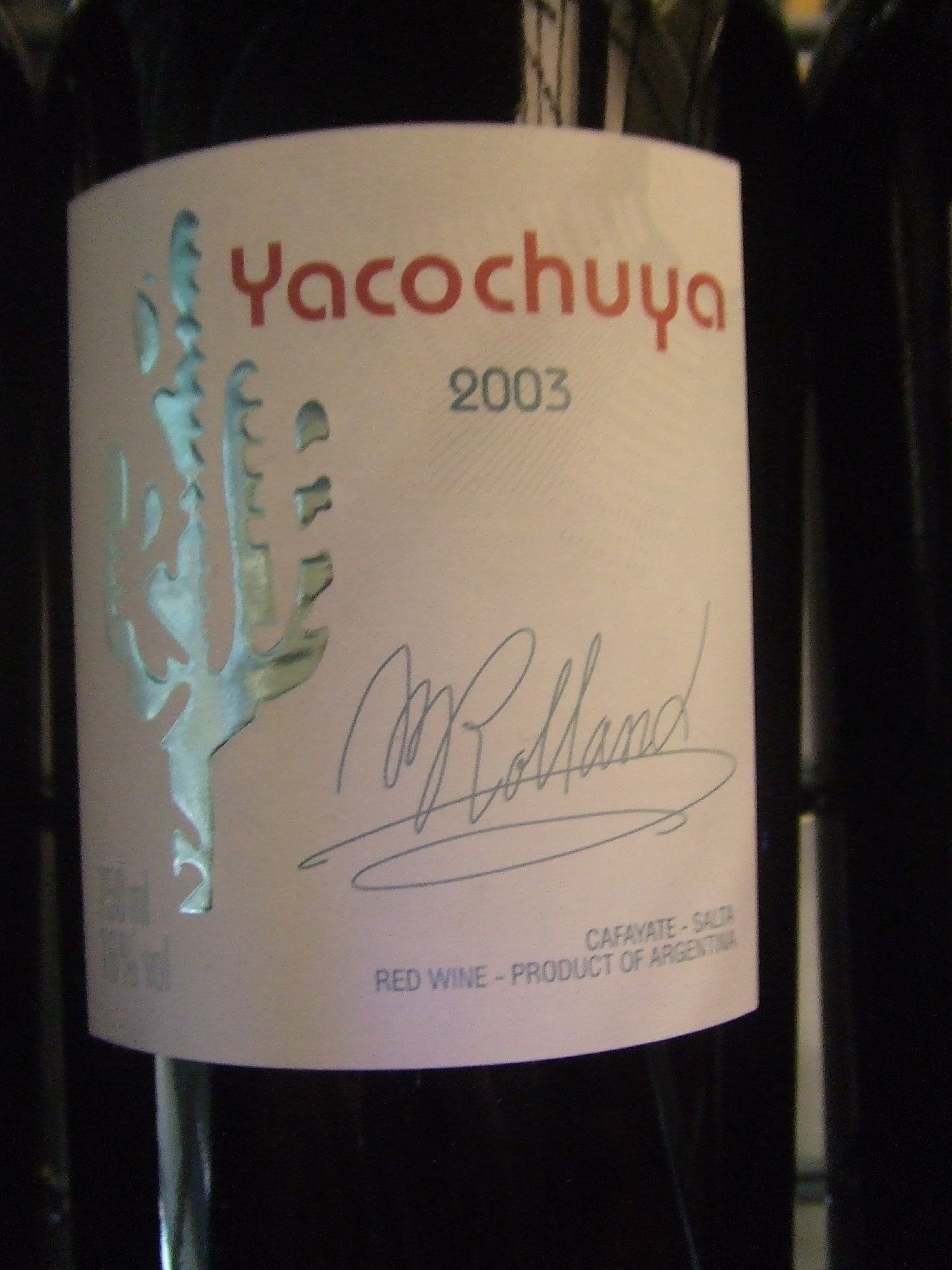
Michel Rolland's signature on a bottle of the Argentine wine Yacochuya which Rolland owned as part of a joint venture in Cafayate.

Rolland features prominently in the critical 2004 documentary Mondovino by Jonathan Nossiter as an agent of wine globalization. In Mondovino, Rolland is seen on several occasions advising his clients to microoxygenate their wines, including a scene at Château Le Gay in Bordeaux. Since the film, Rolland has said that he is "not a fan of microoxygenation. The film suggests I am. Some of my clients inquire about it. It can help in special conditions — if the tannins are fierce or hard, micro-oxygenation can make them softer and rounder. In certain countries with certain terroir, like Chile or Argentina, I may use it." James Suckling, formerly of Wine Spectator, notes in an article about Rolland that "He is not a proponent of micro-oxidation in wine-making as some suggest, and never has been".

Michel Rolland was also a wine making consultant for the Amphorae Winery in Israel (marketed as Makura in the United States) and has started signing his name to their premium Makura series. He visited Amphorae and their vineyards once a year and had his assistants throughout the year help implement his practices adopted by Amphorae's wine making team at the winery and in their vineyards.

Rolland is among the wine personalities satirised next to Robert Parker in the 2010 bande dessinée comic book, Robert Parker: Les Sept Pêchés capiteux.

== Influence ==
From his consulting work and media presence, Michel Rolland influenced many aspects of both the French and global wine industry. Among the prominent wine personalities that have been influenced by Rolland is the Rhone wine producer Jean-Luc Colombo.

=== Napa Valley vineyards under Rolland influence ===
Rolland's first projects outside of Bordeaux were in California. He consulted for many highly regarded Napa Valley wineries. These included:

- St. Supery, Rutherford
- Dalla Valle Vineyards, Oakville
- Jericho Canyon Vineyard, Calistoga
- Harlan Estate, Oakville
- Staglin Family Vineyard, Rutherford
- Bryant Estate, Pritchard Hill
- Ovid Napa Valley, Pritchard Hill
- Lithology, St. Helena

=== Bordeaux vineyards under Rolland influence ===
Rolland held decisive roles (such as owner, cellar master, oenologist, consultant) in a number of chateaux in Bordeaux. These include:

- Angélus, St-Emilion Grand Cru
- Armens, St-Emilion Grand Cru
- Ausone, St-Emilion Grand Cru
- Beauregard, Pomerol
- Bellefont-Belcier, St-Emilion Grand Cru
- Bellevue Mondotte, St-Emilion Grand Cru
- Bibian, Haut-Médoc
- Blason de l'Evangile, Pomerol
- le Bon Pasteur, Pomerol
- Bonalgue, Pomerol
- Branas Grand Poujeaux, Moulis
- Brillette, Moulis
- de Camensac, Haut-Médoc
- Cap de Faugères, Côtes de Castillon
- Cap Léon Veyrin, Listrac-Médoc
- Certan de May de Certan, Pomerol
- Chapelle d'Ausone, St-Emilion Grand Cru
- Clarke, Listrac-Médoc
- la Clémence, Pomerol
- Clément-Pichon, Haut-Médoc
- Clinet, Pomerol
- Clos des Jacobins, St-Emilion Grand Cru
- Clos du Clocher, Pomerol
- Clos l'Eglise, Pomerol
- Clos les Lunelles, Côtes de Castillon
- Clos Saint-Martin, St-Emilion Grand Cru
- la Commanderie de Mazeyres, Pomerol
- Corbin, St-Emilion Grand Cru
- Côte de Baleau, St-Emilion Grand Cru
- la Couspaude, St-Emilion Grand Cru
- le Crock, St-Estèphe
- Croix de Labrie, St-Emilion Grand Cru
- Destieux, St-Emilion Grand Cru
- Destieux, St-Emilion Grand Cru
- la Dominique, St-Emilion Grand Cru
- l'Evangile, Pomerol
- Faugères, St-Emilion Grand Cru
- Faugères Cuvée Péby, St-Emilion Grand Cru
- la Fleur de Boüard, Lalande de Pomerol
- la Fleur de Gay, Pomerol
- Fombrauge, St-Emilion Grand Cru
- Fontenil, Fronsac
- Franc-Mayne, St-Emilion Grand Cru
- la Garde, Pessac-Léognan
- le Gay, Pomerol
- Giscours, Margaux
- Grand Mayne, St-Emilion Grand Cru
- Grand Ormeau, Lalande de Pomerol
- Grand-Pontet, St-Emilion Grand Cru
- les Grandes Murailles, St-Emilion Grand Cru
- les Grands Chênes, Médoc
- la Gravière, Lalande de Pomerol
- Jean de Gué, Lalande de Pomerol
- Julien, Haut-Médoc
- Kirwan, Margaux
- Larmande, St-Emilion Grand Cru
- Larrivet-Haut-Brion, Pessac-Léognan
- Lascombes, Margaux
- Latour-Martillac, Pessac-Léognan
- Léoville-Poyferré, St-Julien
- Loudenne, Médoc
- Magrez-Fombrauge, St-Emilion Grand Cru
- Malartic-Lagravière, Pessac-Léognan
- Malescot-Saint-Exupéry, Margaux
- Monbousquet, St-Emilion Grand Cru
- Pape Clément, Pessac-Léognan
- Pavie, St-Emilion Grand Cru
- Péby Faugères, St-Emilion Grand Cru
- Petit Village, Pomerol
- Peyfaures, Bordeaux Superior
- Phélan-Ségur, St-Estèphe
- le Plus de la Fleur de Boüard, Lalande de Pomerol
- Pontet-Canet, Pauillac
- Ripeau, St-Emilion Grand Cru
- Rochebelle, St-Emilion Grand Cru
- Rouget, Pomerol
- la Sérénité, Pessac-Léognan
- Smith Haut Lafitte, Pessac-Léognan
- la Tour-Carnet, Haut-Médoc
- Troplong-Mondot, St-Emilion Grand Cru
- la Tulipe de la Garde, Libourne
- de Valandraud, St-Emilion Grand Cru
- la Violette, Pomerol
- Virginie de Valandraud, St-Emilion Grand Cru

== Death ==
Rolland died from a heart attack on 20 March 2026, at the age of 78.

== See also ==
- Parkerization of wine

== Sources ==
- Echikson, William. Noble Rot: A Bordeaux Wine Revolution. NY: W.W.Norton, 2004.
- Robinson, Jancis (Editor) The Oxford Companion to Wine. Oxford, England: Oxford University Press, second edition, 1999
