= Château de Fonbel =

Bordeaux Wine

- Coordinates: 44.88910°N 0.15649°W
- Wine region: Bordeaux
- Appellation: Saint-Émilion

Château de Fonbel is a Bordeaux wine from Saint-Émilion appellation. It is produced by Alain Vautier from nearby and highly ranked Chateau Ausone with a blend that is primarily Merlot. Cabernet Sauvignon, Petit Verdot and a small amount of Carmenere are also used.
