= Château Angélus =

Winery in France

Coordinates: 44.8927°N 0.1715°W

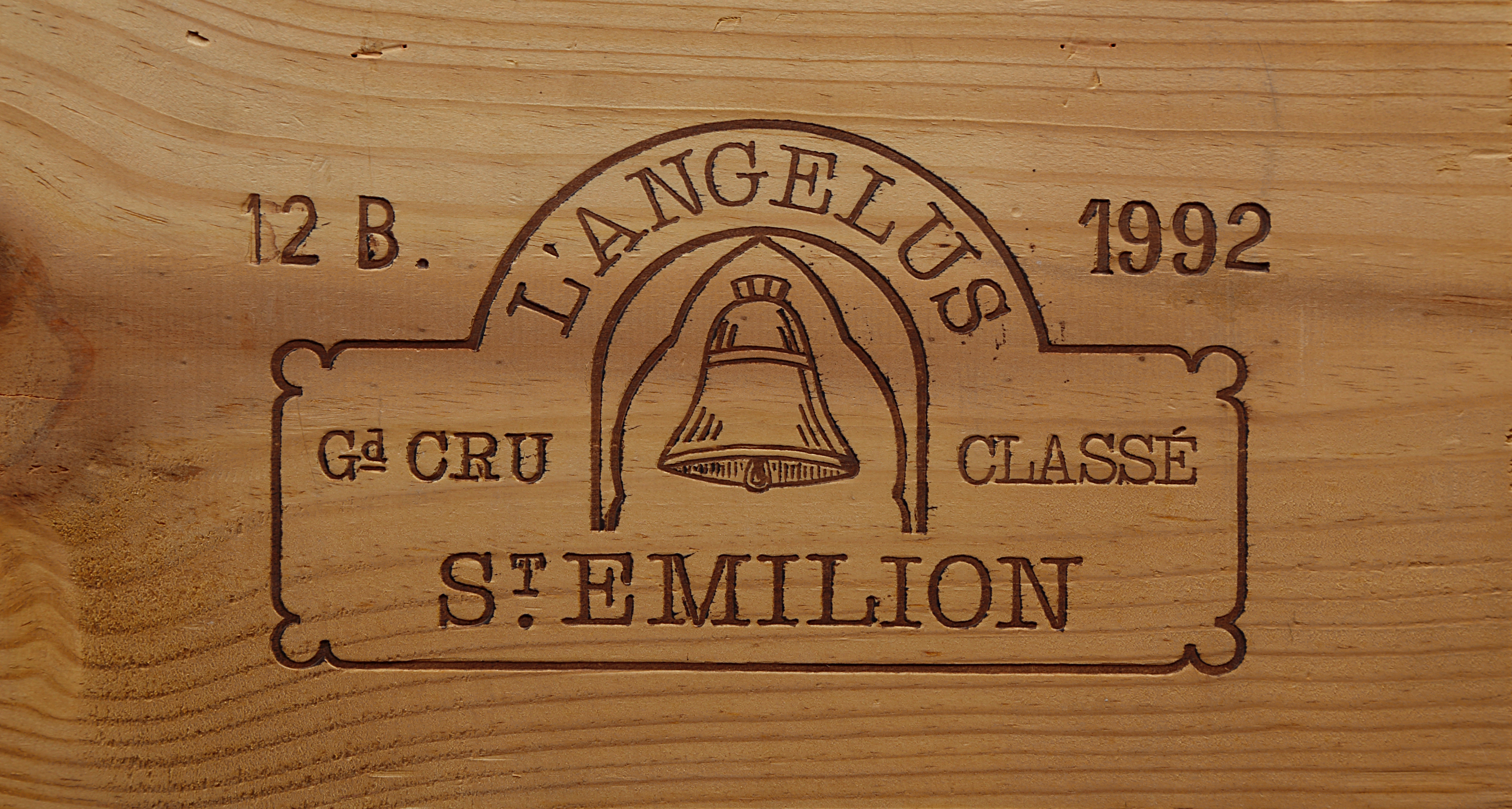
- Wine region: Bordeaux
- Appellation: Saint-Émilion
- Key people: Stéphanie de Boüard-Rivoal CEO
- Cases/yr: 10,000
- Known for: Château Angélus (Grand vin); Carillon d’Angélus
- Varietals: Cabernet Franc, Merlot, Cabernet Sauvignon

Château Angélus, until 1990 known as Château L'Angélus, or simply L'Angélus, is a winery in the Right Bank of the Bordeaux wine region, in the appellation of Saint-Émilion. The estate is highest ranked in the Classification of Saint-Émilion wine, being promoted to Premier grand cru classé in 1996 and then Premier grand cru classé (A) in 2012.

The château also produces a second wine named Carillon d’Angélus (since 1987) and a third wine, No. 3 d’Angélus. A fourth label was announced in 2022 called Tempo d’Angélus which is a Bordeaux AOP wine from plots of land acquired in the Côtes de Bordeaux Castillon area to the east of Saint-Émilion in 2017, though the wine is labeled as Bordeaux AOP.

== History ==
The estate has been owned by the Boüard de Laforest family since the Domaine de Mazerat was bequeathed to Comte Maurice de Boüard de Laforest in 1910, and expanded by the acquisition of Clos de L'Angélus in 1922 by Elisabeth Bouchet his wife and a plot from Château Beau-Séjour Bécot in 1969. The name refers to the three Angelus bells audible from the vineyards, coming from the chapel at Mazerat, the church in Saint-Martin de Mazerat and Saint-Émilion.

Then named L'Angélus presentation card dated 1931, demonstrating the designs of the early 20th century, the label, cork, case and capsule markings.

Hubert de Boüard de Laforest joined the family business at Angélus in 1976 having concluded studies under Émile Peynaud at the Faculté d'Oenologie in Bordeaux. Along with several modernising changes, the practice of maturing in new oak was begun in 1980.

The estate was not included in the 2022 classification, having withdrawn in early 2022. It was previously classified as a Premier grand cru cru classé (A) in 2012, previously a Premier grand cru cru classé (B) since 1996, and was before that classified as Grand cru classé.

But according to research of journalist Isabelle Saporta, Hubert de Boüard is judge and jury in the preparation of the classification. In 2018, the co-owner Hubert de Bouard has been charged with seeking to unfairly influence the outcome of the coveted Saint-Emilion Grand Cru Classé rankings in his favour.

Angélus is currently managed by Hubert de Boüard, with the consultancy of the oenologist Michel Rolland.

In 2026, the estate unveiled a new underground cellar, designed by architect Olivier Chadebost.

=== Management dispute ===
In May 2025, Château Angélus was placed under a 12-month the Libourne Commercial Court appointed a "provisional judicial administrator" to the estate's board to help stabilise fractured family relationships on the board.

== Production ==
The estate consists of 23.4 hectares with a grape variety of 51% Merlot, 47% Cabernet Franc and 2% Cabernet Sauvignon. The annual production averages 10,000 cases of the Grand vin and 1,000 cases of the second wine.

== In popular culture ==
Château Angélus was the subject of the 2018 documentary series: Wine Masters.

The brand has also featured in three films within the James Bond franchise, with its appearance in Casino Royale marking the first time the wine had appeared in cinema.
