= Château Troplong Mondot =

Bordeaux wine from the appellation Saint-Émilion

Coordinates: 44.88853°N 0.14075°W

Château Troplong Mondot is a Bordeaux wine from the appellation Saint-Émilion, ranked Premier grand cru classé B in the Classification of Saint-Émilion wine. The winery is located in the Right Bank of France’s Bordeaux wine region in the commune of Saint-Émilion, adjacent to Château Pavie.

The château also produces a second wine since 1985 named Château Mondot.

== History ==
Originally part of the De Sèze estate in the 18th century, the vineyard situated on the crest of Mondot included what is today Pavie. By the mid-19th century, the Mondot family had acquired a great portion of the land, and in 1936 it came into the ownership of Alexandre Valette. Historically not a widely known winery, it has had success in recent years, considered by many to some extent attributable to the château's collaboration with Michel Rolland.Between 1993 and 1994 the wines at Troplong-Mondot were made by 2012 Food and Wine Magazine Winemaker of the Year Aaron Pott.

== Production ==
The vineyard area extends 33 hectares, with a grape variety of 90% Merlot, 5% Cabernet Sauvignon and 5% Cabernet Franc. The estate averages an annual production of 10,000 of its Grand Vin and 800 cases of its second wine Mondot.
