= Château La Tour du Pin Figeac (Giraud-Bélivier) =

Bordeaux wine estate in the appellation Saint-Émilion

Château La Tour du Pin Figeac is a Bordeaux wine estate in the appellation Saint-Émilion, and is currently owned by the Giraud family.

== History ==
Until 1879, this property was a part of the Figeac estate, acquired to form Château La Tour Figeac, which was further sold and divided into two parts, this property and that of Château La Tour du Pin Figeac (Moueix).

Bought in 1923 by M. G. Bélivier, the Giraud family acquired the property in 1972. The Moueix property of the same name was sold to Château Cheval Blanc in 2006, who renamed it and later absorbed it, so the Giraud property is now the only Château La Tour du Pin Figeac.

The estate was rated Grand Cru Classé in the original Classification of Saint-Émilion wine, but lost this status in 2006, only to have the verdict reversed in 2008. Château La Tour du Pin Figeac was excluded from the 2012 classification, and its appeal failed.

== Production ==
The vineyards extend to 11 hectares (27 acres).

The Grand vin is typically a blend of 75% Merlot and 25% Cabernet Franc.
