= Château de Rayne-Vigneau =

Sweet white wine

Coordinates: 44°32′51″N 0°20′41″W

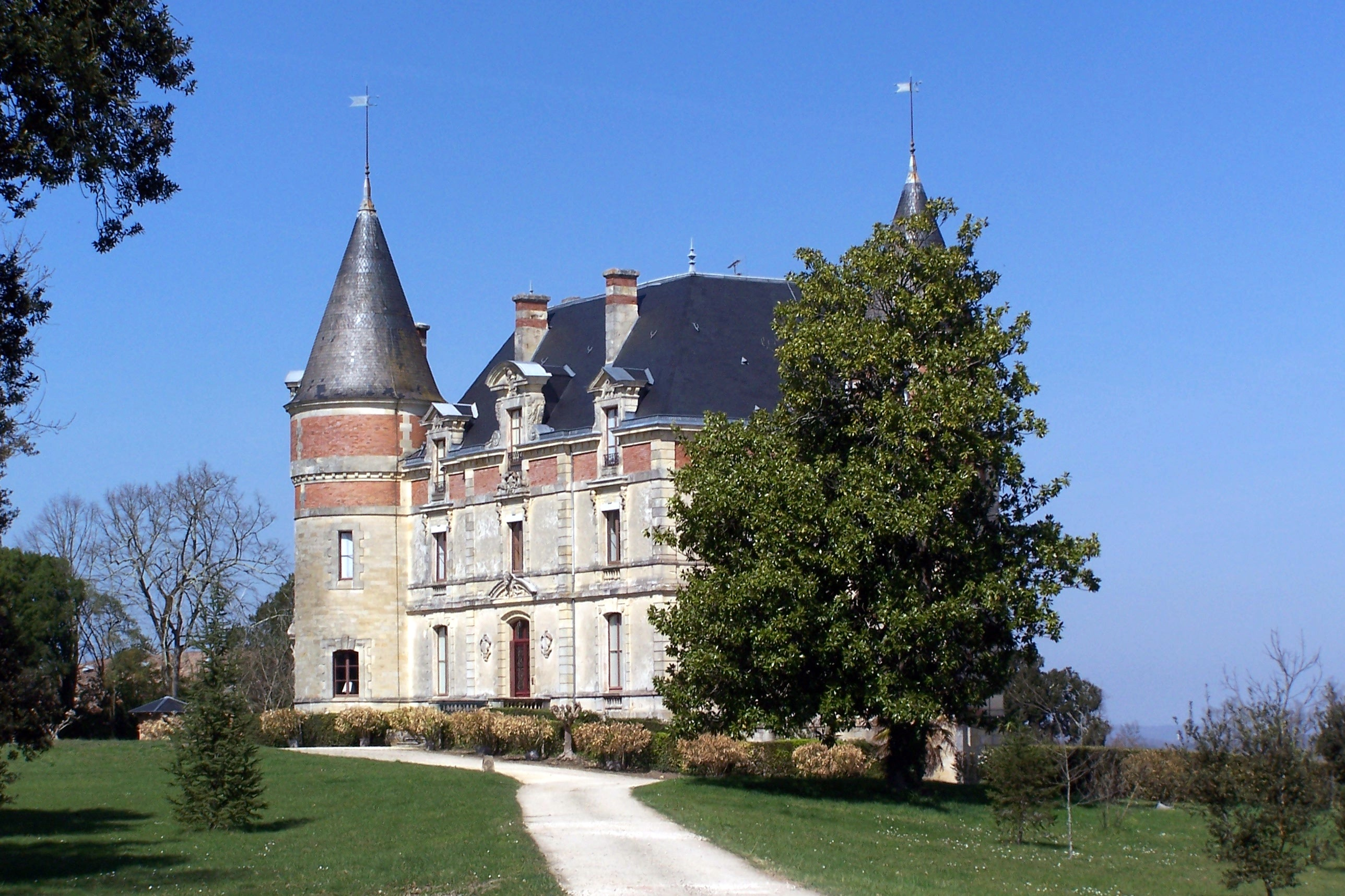
Château de Rayne-Vigneau in Bommes (Gironde, France)

Château de Rayne-Vigneau is a sweet white wine ranked as Premier Cru Classé (French, “First Growth”) in the original Bordeaux Wine Official Classification of 1855. Belonging to the Sauternes appellation in Gironde, in the region of Graves, the winery is located in Bommes. It has been owned by Crédit Agricole since 2004.

The castle, its park with its facilities are the subject of a classification as historic monuments by decree of 19 April 2004.

In 2015, the estate is bought by the group Trésor du Patrimoine.
