= Château La Tour du Pin Figeac (Moueix) =

Former Bordeaux wine estate in France

Château La Tour du Pin Figeac (Moueix), later Château La Tour du Pin for a brief period, is a former Bordeaux wine estate in the appellation Saint-Émilion which produced wine up until 2011. The estate was purchased by owners of neighbouring Château Cheval Blanc in 2006, who managed the estate as a separate property up until 2011. The estate in effect ceased to exist after this, being absorbed into its grander neighbour.

== History ==
Until 1879, this property was a part of the Figeac estate, acquired to form Château La Tour Figeac, half of which was further sold and divided into two parts, this property and that of Château La Tour du Pin Figeac (Giraud-Bélivier). This estate, the smallest of the three, was bought in 1947 by Antoine Moueix, cousin of J. P. Moueix. The property remained in the hands of the Moueix family until 2006, when it was bought by the owners of Château Cheval Blanc, who adopted the name Château La Tour du Pin. The last vintage made was 2011. The best area of the vineyard (3.5ha) has been absorbed into the Château Cheval Blanc vineyard, and the remainder is currently used to make generic Saint-Émilion.

The estate was rated Grand Cru Classé in the Classification of Saint-Émilion wine, but lost this status in 2006, only to have the verdict reversed in 2008. The estate did not re-apply for the 2012 classification.

== Production ==
The vineyards extended 9 hectares (22 acres), and was considered the more gravelly of the three La Tour properties, closer to the conditions of neighbours Figeac and Cheval Blanc.

The Grand vin was typically a blend of 70% Merlot and 30% Cabernet Franc, as was the estate's second wine, Clos La Fleur Figeac.
