= Château Canon-la-Gaffelière =

Bordeaux wine

Coordinates: 44.88117°N 0.16085°W

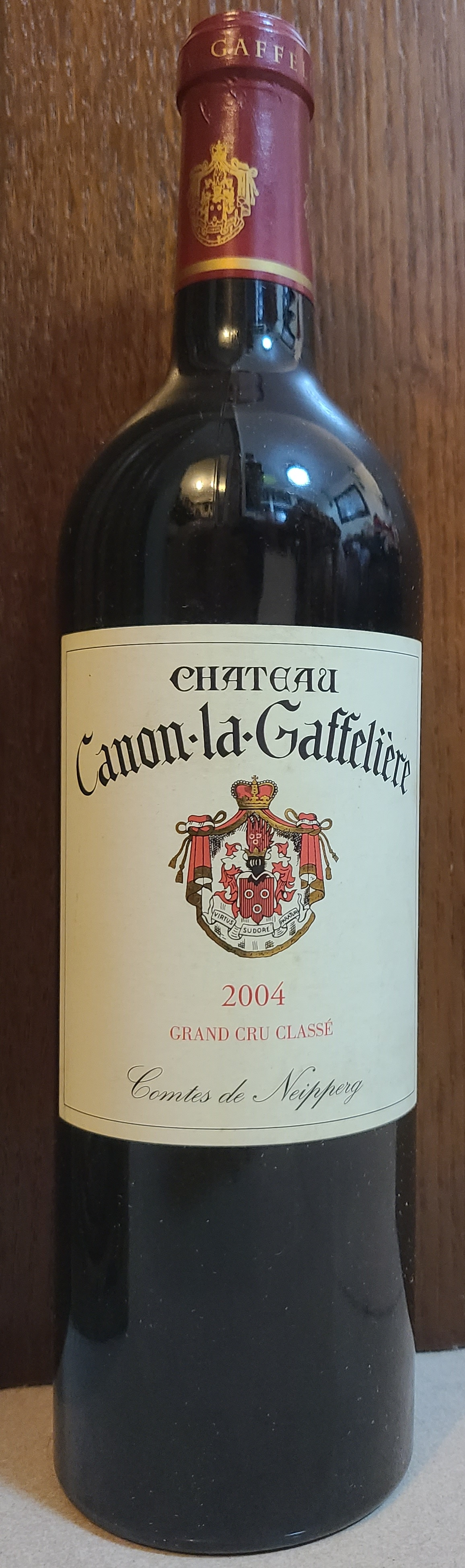
Château Canon-la-Gaffelière 2004

Château Canon-la-Gaffelière is a Bordeaux wine from the appellation Saint-Émilion, ranked Premier Grand Cru Classé B in the Classification of Saint-Émilion wine. The winery is located in the Right Bank of France's Bordeaux wine region in the commune of Saint-Émilion, in the department Gironde.

The estate also produces the second wine Côte Mignon La Gaffelière, and is closely involved with the production of the highly-rated Premier Grand Cru Classé B "Vin de garage" La Mondotte.

== History ==
Although an old property with viticultural history dating back to the 17th century when the Comte de Malets-Roqueforts bought extensive real-estate, including the site of a leper colony, and rented out large parts to sharecroppers. This vineyard came to prominence when Boitard de la Poterie family bought and cultivated what became known as Canon-Boitard, while the remaining land retained by the Malets-Roqueforts would become Château La Gaffelière. Both the estates apply the word gaffet, which translates to leper.

In 1971 the estate was bought by count Joseph-Hubert von Neipperg, and in 1985 passed control to his son count Stephan von Neipperg, the current proprietor. Accredited with much of the success of the estate, his other properties include Clos de l'Oratoire and the "super-cuvée" La Mondotte, as well as Château d'Aiguilhe.

Having once been an exponent of modern techniques in winemaking, including microoxygenation, von Neipperg has become critical of his own earlier vintages. Since the early 2000s he has reverted Canon-la-Gaffelière to a style of moderation aiming at a truer expression of wine, and is quoted saying "I don't make plum pudding".

The estate's consultant was self-taught oenologist Stéphane Derenoncourt.

== Production ==
The vineyard area extends 19.5 hectares with the grape varieties of 55% Merlot, 40% Cabernet Franc and 5% Cabernet Sauvignon.

Of the Grand vin, Château Canon-la-Gaffelière there is a total annual production of 7,500 cases, in addition to the production of the second wine, Côte Mignon La Gaffelière.

== La Mondotte ==
From a small plot of limestone near Château Pavie-Macquin, originally purchased by Joseph-Hubert von Neipperg in 1971 when it was named Château La Mondotte, the terroir initially produced crops that struggled to ripen and did not meet expectations. Using the most modern techniques, the word "château" was omitted to emphasise a new start, and that the little house on the property is hardly a château, La Mondotte was launched with the 1996 vintage. With its extreme characteristics, it is alternately referred to as a "super-cuvée" or a "garage wine", and has become one of the most expensive wines of Bordeaux.

From a vineyard area of 4.5 hectares composed of 80% Merlot and 20% Cabernet Franc, the estate has an annual production of 650 to 1,000 cases a year. As well as Canon la Gaffelière, La Mondotte has also been promoted a Premier Grand cru classé estate with the Saint-Émilion reclassification in 2012.
