= Château Guadet =

Winery in Saint-Émilion, Bordeaux, France

Château Guadet is a winery in Saint-Émilion, Bordeaux, France. It took its current name in 2005. It was known as Château Guadet Saint-Julien from 1844 to 2004. The winery is a Grand cru classé in the Classification of Saint-Émilion wine.

== History ==
The small vineyard situated on the limestone plateau of Saint Emilion at 50 metres of the north door of the plateau calcaire. The name came from the Lacombe Guadet family who sold the estate in 1877 to Mathieu Garitey, ancestor of Guy-Petrus Lignac, manager of the estate today. Marguerite-Élie Guadet was a French political figure of the Revolutionary period famous lawyer in Bordeaux and a girondin member of the house. He hid himself with other congressmen in the tunnels which snake beneath Saint Emilion. He was discovered and taken to Bordeaux, where, after his identity had been established, was guillotined. In memory the main street of the village of Saint Emilion where the estate is, carries his name. His image is to be found on the label today, perpetuating his memory.

The Château changed its name in 2005 to Château Guadet, to avoid any confusion with its namesake in the appellation Saint Julien Beychevelle in the Médoc area. In the 2006 review of the classification of Saint-Émilion wine, this estate was amongst those which were demoted from Grand cru classé status, but was reinstated to Grand Cru Classé in 2008.

Today Guy-Petrus Lignac, great nephew of Marie Louise Loubat who created Château Pétrus, is managing the estate. The consultant Stéphane Derenoncourt and his team assist Lignac in the work.

== Vineyards ==
The vineyard is situated 50 metres north of the village of Saint Emilion. It is planted with 75% of Merlot and 25% of Cabernet Franc. The size of the estate is 5.50 hectares (13.6 acres). The vineyard is planted on low deep soil with a majority of clay and sand on the limestone plateau of Saint Emilion.
