= Château Larcis Ducasse =

Château Larcis Ducasse is a French wine estate of Bordeaux wine which has the appellation Saint-Émilion, ranked Premier Grand cru classé B in the Classification of Saint-Émilion wine. The winery is located in the Right Bank of France’s Bordeaux wine region in the department Gironde.

== History ==
In the 16th century Larcis Ducasse’s wines were extremely popular and already highly sought after. Records show that in 1777 they were purchased at a very high price by Pierre Beylot. Then, in 1841, Lecoutre de Beauvais mentions Larcis as being one of the best Saint-Emilion crus. A few years later in 1867, a first gold medal from the International Exposition in Paris was awarded for the quality of the wines produced in this exceptional terroir. In 1893, Château Larcis Ducasse was purchased by Henry Raba – a direct descendant of a major Bordeaux ship-owning and merchant family based in Bordeaux from the 18th century. His passion led him to invest a significant portion of his fortune in maintaining this terraced vineyard and equipping the chateau with state-of-the art winery equipment. His son André took over upon his death in 1925. André then died during the war. He was childless, so his niece Hélène Gratiot Alphandéry inherited the property in 1941. She in her turn managed the property along with cellar-master Pharaon Roche and her son, Jacques Olivier Gratiot, director with l’Oréal and member of the Jurade, became manager in 1990. Today, Château Larcis Ducasse is still in the hands of the Gratiot Alphandéry family and since 2002 the property has been under the management of Nicolas Thienpont.

== Production ==
The vineyard area is around 11 hectares, with the grape varieties of approximately 65% Merlot, 25% Cabernet Franc and 10% Cabernet Sauvignon.
