= Château Pavie-Macquin =

Bordeaux wine from the appellation Saint-Émilion

Coordinates: 44.89070°N 0.14911°W

- Location: Saint-Émilion, Bordeaux, France
- Appellation: Saint-Émilion
- Other labels: Les Chênes de Macquin
- Key people: Nicolas Thienpont (Manager), Stéphane Derenoncourt (Oenologist)
- Cases/yr: 6,400 cases (approximate)
- Varietals: Merlot, Cabernet Franc, Cabernet Sauvignon
- Website: Château Pavie-Macquin Official Site

Château Pavie-Macquin is a Bordeaux wine from the appellation Saint-Émilion, ranked Premier grand cru classé B in the Classification of Saint-Émilion wine. The winery is one of three Pavie estates, along with Château Pavie and Château Pavie-Decesse, located in the Right Bank of France’s Bordeaux wine region in the commune of Saint-Émilion in the department Gironde. Having risen in esteem in the 1990s, it was promoted to Premier Grand Cru Classé in 2006.

The château also produces a second wine named Les Chênes de Macquin (The Oaks of Macquin).

== History ==
Once a part of the large estate of Ferdinand Bouffard, a 19th-century Bordeaux négociant, it was acquired by Albert Macquin, also the owner of the neighbouring Château La Serre, who would become known as a pioneer in the battle against phylloxera, and whose vines at Pavie-Macquin were among the first to be grafted onto American rootstocks. After studying viticulture at the Ecole d'Agriculture in Montpellier, Macquin was aware of the new techniques involving grafting the phylloxera resistant Vitis labrusca American rootstock onto the Vitis vinifera vines. While neighboring Chateaux were still looking for a cure to heal the infected vines, Macquin set about replanting his entire vineyard with the more resistant rootstock and was able to rebound more quickly from the phylloxera epidemic that plagued the Bordeaux wine industry. In Henri Enjalbert's description, "for more than 30 years Macquin was a one-man viticultural industry, the mastermind behind the transformation of the Saint-Émilion vineyards."

The estate is currently owned by the Corre family, descendants of Albert Macquin, and is managed by Nicolas Thienpont with the oenologist Stéphane Derenoncourt in charge of vinification. The team of Thienpont and Derenoncourt has been credited with increasing the profile of Pavie-Macquin in recent years, introducing biodynamic viticulture and more modern winemaking techniques. In 2006, the Château was promoted from Grands crus classés to Premiers grands crus classés B in the Saint-Émilion wine classification.

== Production ==
The vineyard area extends 15 hectares with the grape varieties of 84% Merlot, 14% Cabernet Franc and 2% Cabernet Sauvignon.

Of the Grand vin Château Pavie-Macquin and the second wine Les Chênes de Macquin there is typically a total production of 6,400 cases per year.
