= Château Ausone =

Bordeaux wine

- Location: Saint-Emilion
- Coordinates: 44.8892°N 0.1564°W
- Wine region: Bordeaux
- Appellation: Saint-Émilion
- Area cultivated: 7.3 hectares (18 acres)
- Cases/yr: 2000
- Known for: Château Ausone (Grand vin); Chapelle d'Ausone (second wine)
- Varietals: Cabernet Franc, Merlot
- Website: https://www.chateau-ausone.fr/

Château Ausone is a Bordeaux wine from Saint-Émilion appellation, previously ranked Premier Grand Cru Classé (A) in the Classification of Saint-Émilion wine but does not hold this rank after the 2022 reclassification. The winery is located on the Right Bank of France's Bordeaux wine region in the Gironde department, close to the town of Saint-Émilion.

The winery also produces a second wine named Chapelle d'Ausone.

== History ==
Placed on the western edge of 11th century village Saint-Émilion, with elevated vineyards facing south on steep terraces in ideal situation, Ausone takes its name from Decimius Magnus Ausonius (310–395 AD), a statesman and poet from Bordeaux who owned about 100 acres (0.40 km^{2}) of vineyard. It is believed by some that Château Ausone is on the foundations of his villa.

The modern estate can be dated to the 18th century, when it was owned by Jean Cantenat. Later, under the ownership of the Lafargue family, the vineyard was inherited by Edouard Dubois who steered the château through the difficulties of the late 19th century, and in 1916 added the adjacent Château Belair to their estate. The chateaux were run separately, although both age their wine in the Ausone cellars, caves in the limestone cliffs beneath the town of Saint-Émilion. After Dubois died in 1921, his widow Hélyette Dubois-Challon and Dubois' children of a previous marriage who married into the Vauthier family took control over the estate.

Château Ausone presentation card dated 1931, demonstrating the designs of the early 20th century, the label, cork, case and capsule markings.

Ausone was one of a few estates which escaped the terrible frost of 1956, unlike its neighbour Cheval Blanc that lost several years' vintages. Other neighbours suffered the destruction of their vines. Despite being one of the great names of Bordeaux, Ausone fell into decline until Pascal Delbeck was appointed winemaker in 1976.

For several years Ausone was jointly owned by the Dubois-Challon and Vauthier families. After an unsettling time, feuding in the courts was brought to an end when the Vauthiers bought the Dubois-Challon shares in the mid 1990s. Alain Vauthier became managing director of Ausone, while Hélyette Dubois-Challon won the right to live in the chateau until her death in 2003.

Michel Rolland was appointed consultant oenologist in 2002.

== Production ==
The success of the wine produced at Ausone is attributed to a combination of exposure and the soil, a mixture of sand and clay on limestone unique to the district. The vineyard is 7 hectares (17 acres), arranged with the grape varieties of 50% Cabernet Franc and 50% Merlot, planted with a density of 6,500 plants per hectare. Due to the small scale of the vineyards, picking may be done at an optimal moment, usually in two afternoons.

Of both the Grand vin and the second wine Chapelle d'Ausone, the annual production averages little more than 2,000 cases (180 hL).

== See also ==
- Château de Fonbel
