= Château La Gaffelière =

Coordinates: 44°53′07″N 0°09′26″W

Château La Gaffelière, previously Château Gaffelière-Naudes, is a Bordeaux wine from the Saint-Émilion appellation, ranked among the Premiers grands crus classés B in the Classification of Saint-Émilion wine. The winery is located west of Château Pavie, just south of the town of Saint-Émilion, within the commune of the same name.

The château also produces a second wine named Clos La Gaffelière.

== History ==
Founded on the ruins of a Gallo-Roman villa named "Le Palat", and later a 17th-century leper colony, the estate was sharecropping land that came to the ownership of the Comte de Malet-Roquefort. The word "gaffet" translates to leper.

Near the end of the 19th century, the original extensive estate was divided into what became Château Canon-la-Gaffelière, and the area then called Puygenestous-Naudes, renamed Château Gaffelière-Naudes. The name was simplified after 1963. After three centuries, it still belongs to the Malet-Roquefort family.

== Production ==
From 25 hectares the vineyard area extends 22 hectares, with a grape variety of 66% Merlot, and the remainder split between Cabernet Franc and Cabernet Sauvignon.

Chateau La Gaffelière annually produces on average 10,000 cases of the Grand vin.
