= Château Beau-Séjour Bécot =

Bordeaux wine from the appellation Saint-Émilion

Coordinates: 44.89478°N 0.16439°W

- Wine region
- Other names: Formerly Château Beauséjour-Dr-Fagouet
- Type: Winery (Estate)
- Year established: 1787 (named Beauséjour)
- Country: France
- Part of: Saint-Émilion, Bordeaux
- Soil conditions: Limestone plateau with fossilized starfish chalk
- Total area: 18.5 hectares
- Size of planted vineyards: 16.5 hectares
- Grapes produced: Merlot; Cabernet Franc; Cabernet Sauvignon
- Varietals produced: 76% Merlot, 22% Cabernet Franc, 2% Cabernet Sauvignon (2022 vintage)
- Wine produced: 5,000 cases (Grand Vin)
- Official designation: Premier grand cru classé B

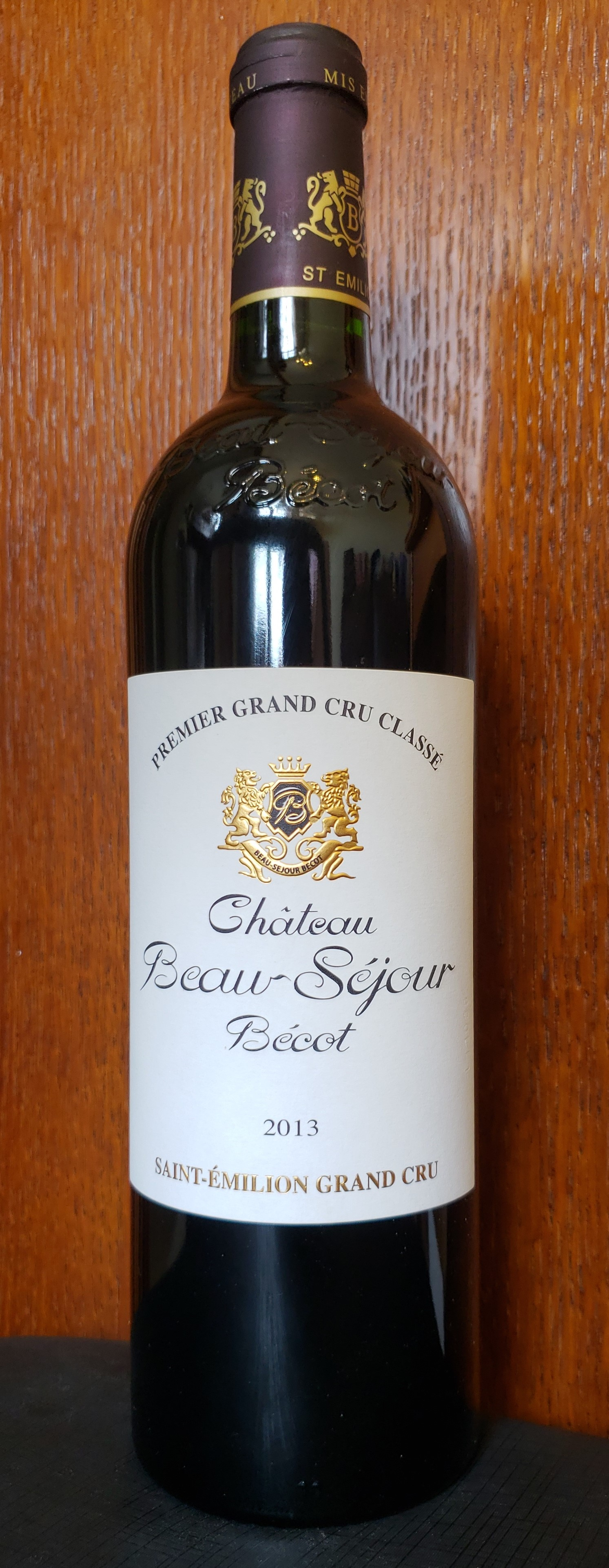
Grand Vin 2013

Château Beau-Séjour Bécot, formerly Château Beauséjour-Dr-Fagouet, is a Bordeaux wine from the appellation Saint-Émilion, ranked Premier grand cru classé B in the Classification of Saint-Émilion wine. The winery is located in the Right Bank of France's Bordeaux wine region in the commune of Saint-Émilion, in the department Gironde.

The estate also produces the second wine Tournelle de Beau-Séjour Bécot, as well as the "Vin de garage", La Gomerie.

== History ==
Once a vineyard cultivated by the monks of the Church of St-Martin during the Middle Ages, in the 17th century it was acquired by the Gerès family, the land then named Peycoucou. By marriage the estate came to the de Carle family, seigneurs of Figeac, and in 1787 General Jacques de Carle renamed the property to Beauséjour. When the historic estate in its entirety came to Pierre-Paulin Ducarpe, it was divided in 1869 between his two children. The daughter wed Duffau-Lagarosse, received what became Château Beauséjour-Duffau-Lagarrosse (present day Château Beauséjour) and his son inherited the half which was sold in 1924 to Dr. Fagouet, altering the name to Château Beauséjour-Dr-Fagouet. The estate received its current name after it was acquired in 1969 by Michel Bécot who began extensive efforts to modernise.

Michel Bécot retired in 1985, and the estate is to date run by the sons Gérard and Dominique Bécot.

=== Demotion ===
The INAO committee in charge revising the Classification of Saint-Émilion wine in 1985 demoted Château Beau-Séjour Bécot from Premier Grand Cru Classé to Grand Cru Classé, as Beau-Séjour Bécot had in 1979 incorporated two other vineyards into its estate, La Carte, owned by the Bécot family since 1929, and Trois Moulins. The vineyard area was increased by 85%, making only Château Pavie the larger estate in the area.

The demotion was followed by unprecedented controversy. While no formal application to incorporate the amalgamated vineyards had been made, Beau-Séjour Bécot maintained there had been no loss in quality as demonstrated in formal wine tastings as stipulated by the Saint-Émilion AOC rules.

The estate was promoted back to its previous classification at the following revision in 1996.

== Production ==
The vineyard area extends 16.5 hectares with the grape varieties of 70% Merlot, 24% Cabernet Franc and 6% Cabernet Sauvignon. Of the Grand vin, Château Beau-Séjour Bécot and the second wine, Tournelle de Beau-Séjour Bécot, there is a total annual production of 5,000 cases.

== La Gomerie ==
The Bécot family acquired the Gomerie vineyard in 1995, an adjacent plot of 2.5 hectares, from which a wine is produced in the manner of "Garage wine". From a small vineyard of extremely low yields, the wine performs according to "Garagiste" norms, with new wood predominance, a small production, high ratings from Robert Parker and high prices.

The wine consists of 100% Merlot, and production is limited to 1,000 cases per year. From this vineyard there is also produced a second wine, Mademoiselle La Gomerie.
