= Château Bélair-Monange =

Coordinates: 44.88880°N 0.16165°W

Château Bélair-Monange (French pronunciation: [ʃato belɛʁ mɔnɑ̃ʒ]), named until 2007 Château Belair, is a Bordeaux vineyard from the appellation Saint-Émilion Grand Cru, ranked Premier grand cru classé B in the Classification of Saint-Émilion wine. The winery is located in the Right Bank of France's Bordeaux wine region in the commune of Saint-Émilion, in the department Gironde. The estate was considered a leading producer of Saint-Émilion until the 20th century.

== History ==
Next door neighbour of Château Ausone, Belair may also have been the property of the statesman and poet Decimus Magnus Ausonius (310-395 CE). The vineyard is thought to have been planted between 1730 and 1750 during the time of Jacques Canolle, a descendant of Robert de Knollys or Knolles, who had owned the land in the 14th century. Exiled during the French Revolution, the estate was run by the Goudichau family until the Canolles returned in 1802.

In 1916 Belair was purchased by the owner of Ausone, Edouard Dubois-Challon, and the two estates have remained continually connected. After the death of Edouard Dubois-Challon, the estates were run by his widow Helyett Dubois-Challon, since 1975 with the assistance of Pascal Delbeck. When the widow died in 2003, they were inherited by Delbeck who retained control of the estates though having sold a 30% share of the property to JP Moueix. Following difficulties paying inheritance tax and other taxes, Delbeck was forced to sell the remainder of the estate to Moueix in 2008. The estate's name was then amended in memory of Anne-Adèle Monange, wife of Jean Moueix. Wines produced after the harvest of 2007 bear the new name Château Bélair-Monange.

== Château Magdelaine ==
The 2012 Classification of Saint-Émilion wine omitted the Moueix-owned estate Château Magdelaine from its Premier grand cru classé B listing, which was followed by the announcement by Moueix that Château Magdelaine would be merged with Château Bélair-Monange and retain the latter name.

Château Magdelaine was owned for over two hundred years by the Chatonnet family, who in 1863 doubled the vineyard area buying five hectares of vines from nearby estate Château Fonplégade. The estate was reputed as a leading St. Émilion for much of the 19th century, with praise in Cocks et Féret and rated for its keeping qualities. In 1952 it was acquired by JP Moueix, beginning extensive restorations and replanting just prior to the destructive frosts of 1956. Having passed on to Christian Moueix, the estate came under the management of Edouard Moueix, With passing consecutive harvests, the two sole St. Émilion properties of JP Moueix, neighbouring Magdelaine and Bélair-Monange, came to be a project of combination, and with Edouard Moueix stating they had identified "complementarity and the possibility to produce an even better wine by joining forces", the merging of estates was announced in September 2012.

== Production ==
The Bélair-Monange vineyard area extended 12.5 hectares with a grape variety distribution of 80% Merlot and 20% Cabernet Franc.

The Magdelaine vineyard area extended 11 hectares with a grape variety distribution of 90% Merlot and 10% Cabernet Franc. Of the grand vin Château Magdelaine, there was normally produced 3,000 cases, and the second wine, formerly called Château Saint Brice renamed Les Songes de Magdelaine, had an annual production of approximately 2,000 cases.

A second wine, Annonce, is produced since the 2014 vintage.

Footnotes
