= Château Pavie =

Winery in Saint-Émilion in the Bordeaux region of France

Coordinates: 44.8843°N 0.1496°W

- Wine region: Bordeaux
- Appellation: Saint-Émilion
- Area cultivated: 32.44 hectares (80.2 acres)
- Cases/yr: 6500
- Known for: Château Pavie (Grand vin); Château Tour Simard (second), "Les Aromes de Pavie" (starting from 2005)
- Varietals: Merlot, Cabernet Franc, Cabernet Sauvignon
- Website: chateaupavie.com

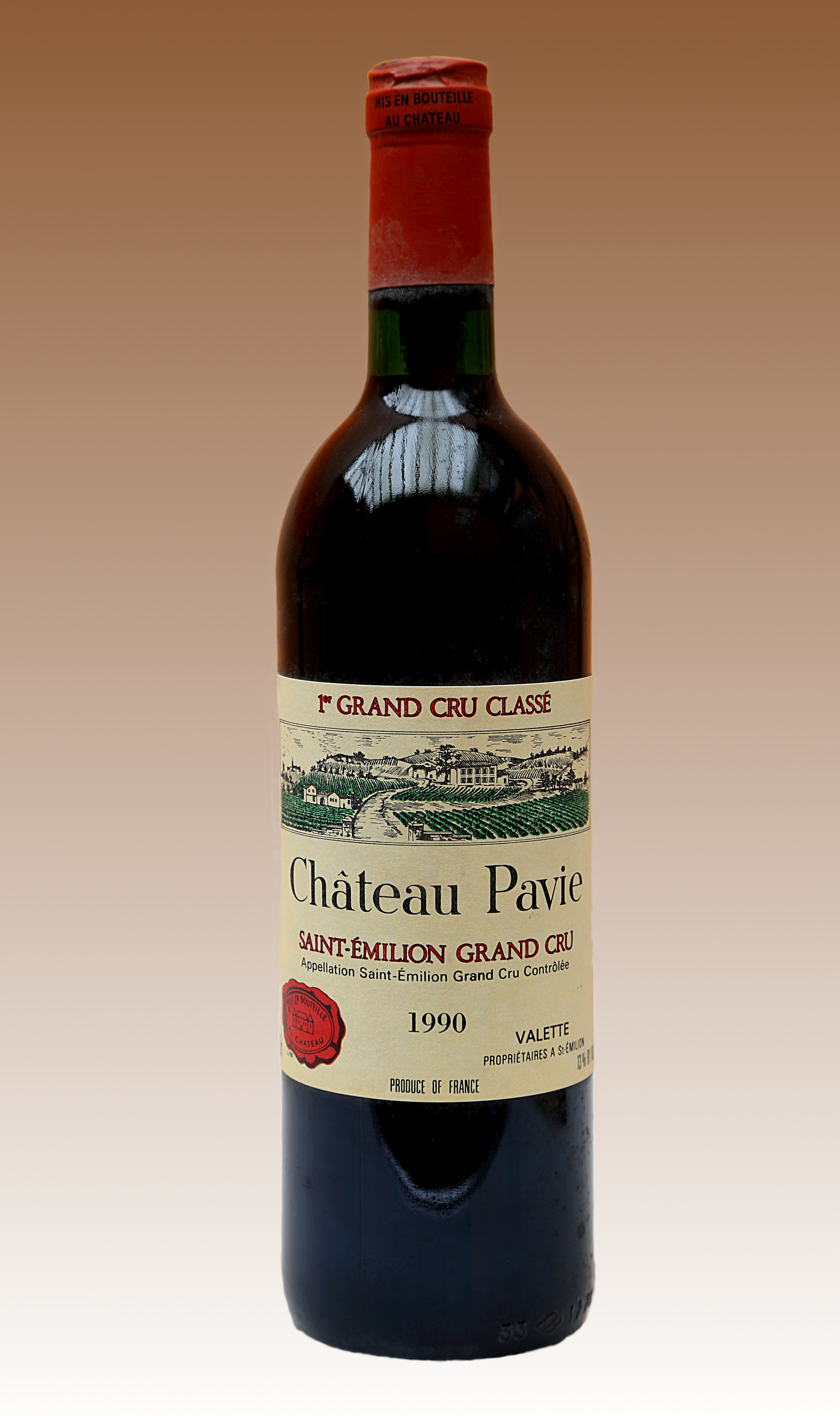
1990 bottle of the vintage

Château Pavie is a winery in Saint-Émilion in the Bordeaux region of France. It lies on the plateau to the southeast of St. Emilion village. In 2012 it was classified in the first rank of the Classification of Saint-Émilion wine, as a Premier Grand Cru Classé (A), after having previously been a Premier Grand Cru Classé (B) since 1954.

== History ==
Like other vineyards in Saint-Émilion such as Château Ausone, the Pavie vineyard dates back to Roman times. It takes its name from the orchards of peaches ("pavies") that used to stand there. The modern estate was assembled by Ferdinand Bouffard in the late 19th century by buying plots from several families. The plots were still managed separately, and the 9 hectares bought from the Pigasse family retained a separate identity as Château Pavie-Decesse.

However Bouffard struggled with phylloxera, and at the end of World War I he sold it to Albert Porte, who sold it to Alexandre Valette in 1943. His grandson Jean-Paul Valette sold it to Gérard Perse in 1998 for $31 million ($61.2 million in 2025).

Perse was a Parisian millionaire and former cyclist who sold two supermarket chains to fund his entry into the wine business. He bought Château Monbousquet in 1993, Château Pavie-Decesse in 1997, and Pavie in 1998. He ripped out most of the old equipment, building new temperature-controlled wooden fermentation vats, a new cellar, and a new irrigation system in the vineyard. He brought in the controversial wine consultant Michel Rolland, who has seen yields cut from 55 hl/ha to 30 hl/ha with severe pruning and green-harvesting and encouraged malolactic fermentation in the wine. The result has seen the wine become much more concentrated and intense.

In 2012, Pavie was elevated to Premier Grand Cru Classé (A) status, which made it one of four such Saint-Émilion producers.

Gérard Perse died in 2025, leaving Pavie to his family

== 2003 vintage controversy ==
The 2003 vintage of Pavie was a flashpoint in the debate about the "Parkerization of wine". This drought year was always going to exacerbate the Perse style of concentrated, alcoholic wines. Jancis Robinson reviewed it thus:

"Completely unappetising overripe aromas. Why? Porty sweet. Port is best from the Douro not St.Emilion. Ridiculous wine more reminiscent of a late-harvest Zinfandel than a red Bordeaux with its unappetising green notes...12/20"

Yet the trade weren't too bothered since the wine was in a style that they knew American critic, Robert Parker would like. Parker accused Robinson of lying in her tasting notes. The media coverage frequently described a "war of words" between the two critics. Less dramatic than the predominant press view, Robinson and Parker currently have a cordial relationship.
