= Classification of Saint-Émilion wine =

Ranking system for French regional wines

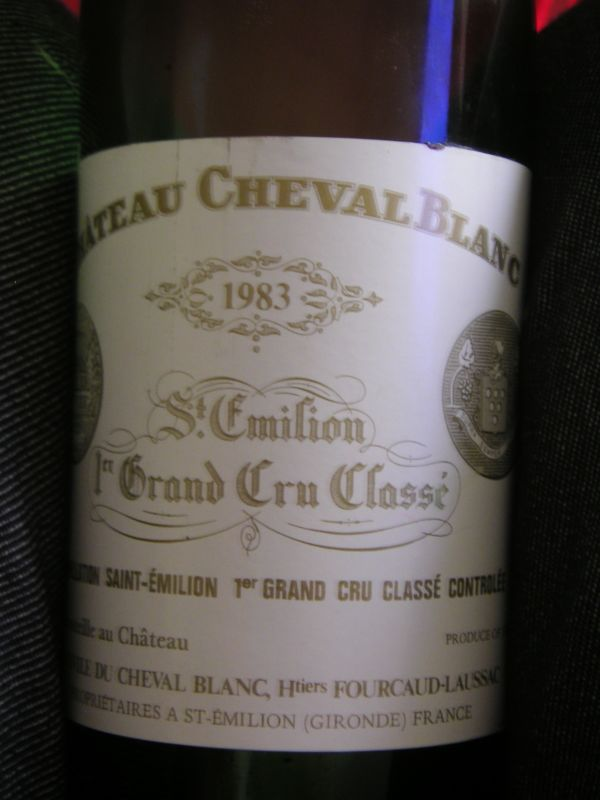
Cheval Blanc, a Premier grand cru classé A wine.

In 1955, the wines of Saint-Émilion in the wine-growing region of Bordeaux were classified. Unlike the Bordeaux Wine Official Classification of 1855 covering wines from the Médoc and Graves regions, the Saint-Émilion list is updated every 10 years or so. Following the initial classification, the list was updated in 1969, 1986, 1996, 2006, 2012, and 2022. However the 2006 classification was declared invalid following a series of legal actions, and the 1996 version of the classification has been reinstated for the vintages from 2006 to 2009.

The region's Syndicat Viticole started planning for a classification of St.-Émilion wine in 1930, but it was not until October 7, 1954, that the principles behind the classification became official when the INAO agreed to take responsibility for handling the classification. The first list of classified St.-Émilion estates was published on June 16, 1955, and was amended on August 7 and October 18, 1958. The original list contained 12 Premier grands crus classés and 63 Grands crus classés.

== Controversy surrounding the 2006 classification ==
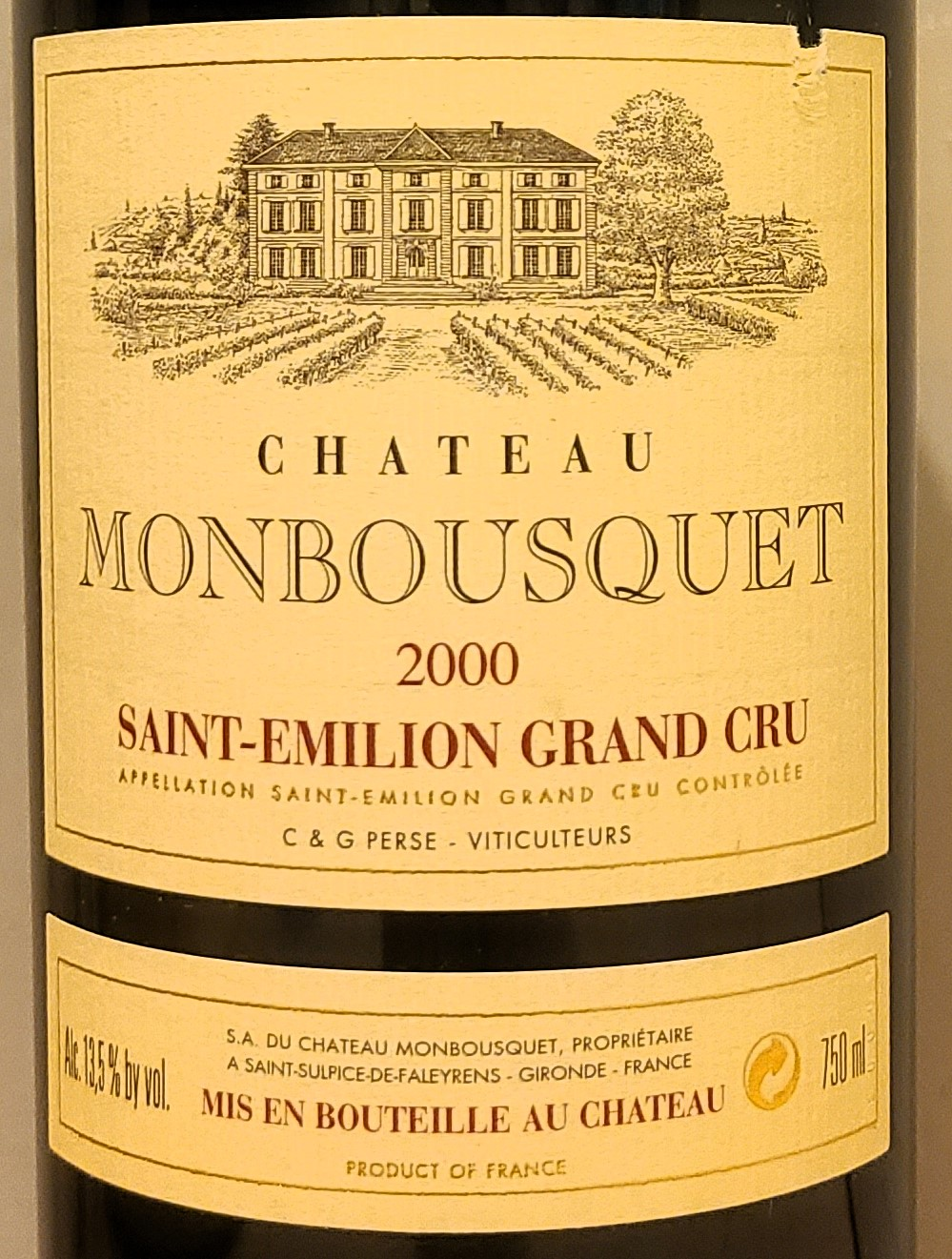
Château Monbousquet was one of the estates who had their initial promotions in the 2006 classification retracted following the controversy.

The fifth classification of St.-Émilion wine, announced in September 2006 and comprising 15 Premiers grands crus classés and 46 Grands crus classés, was challenged by four dissatisfied producers that had been demoted - La Tour du Pin Figeac, Cadet Bon, Guadet and Château de la Marzelle - and has resulted in several confusing legal turns during 2007 and 2008 that currently mean that the 2006 classification is invalid and the 1996 classification is applied instead. The legal dispute centered on the fact that several members of the panel involved in assessing the wines had vested interests (e.g. as négociants with business dealings with some of the châteaux), and thus could be suspected of not being impartial.

Initially, an administrative tribunal in Bordeaux declared the classification temporarily suspended in March 2007, after which a Bordeaux court suspended the classification indefinitely by denying a motion to lift the initial suspension. After that the Conseil d'État, the French supreme administrative court, on November 12, 2007, overturned the suspension of the 2006 classification, thereby reinstating it. However, this ruling was not final, and only decided that the case of the four demoted châteaux did not merit a suspension of the entire classification. The matter was returned to a Bordeaux court to assess if the complaining châteaux had been fairly treated. On July 1, 2008, this court ruled that the wine tasting mechanism used in the 2006 classification was not impartial, thus again making the entire classification invalid.

Immediately after the ruling, it was estimated that a further appeals process aiming at reinstating the classification could take about two years, and would have an uncertain result. This led the French regulatory body for wine, INAO, to request the French Government to use emergency powers to reinstate St.-Émilion classification, which it did on July 11, 2008. This decision extended the validity of the 1996 classification to the vintages 2006 to 2009. Thus, the complaining demoted châteaux were able to keep their classification, but those who were newly promoted were not.

The reaction among the estates who had their promotions retracted, such as Grand Corbin-Despagne, Monbousquet, Pavie-Macquin and Troplong Mondot, was one of despair, who beyond facing financial consequences stated the decision was unjust, and damaging to the image and community of St.-Émilion. Xavier Pariente of Troplong-Mondot said, "That's almost 20 years of hard work and investment by all the personnel here wiped out at the stroke of a pen. It frightens me and it revolts me".

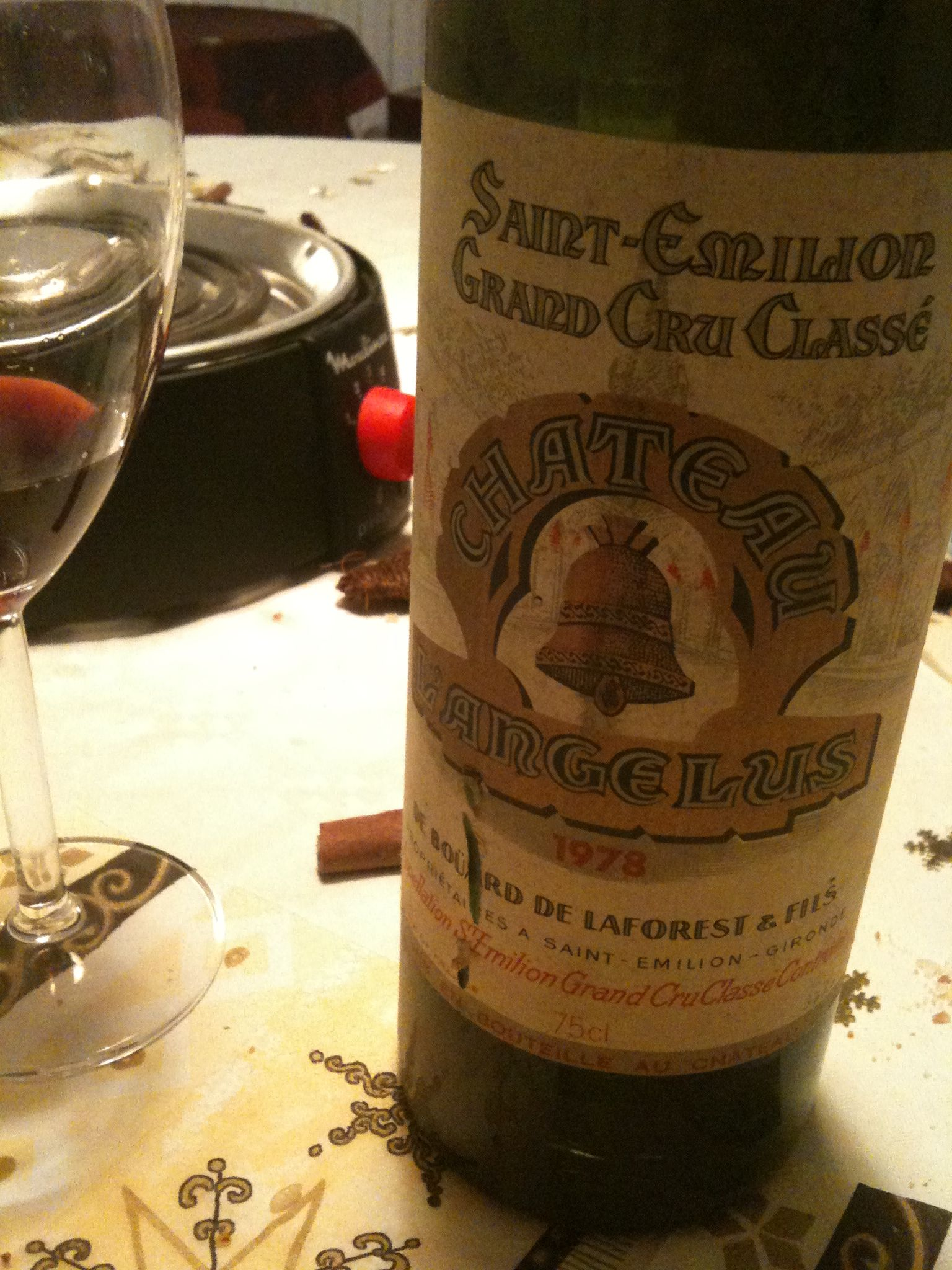
Château Angélus, now withdrawn, was a Premiers grands crus classés A estate.

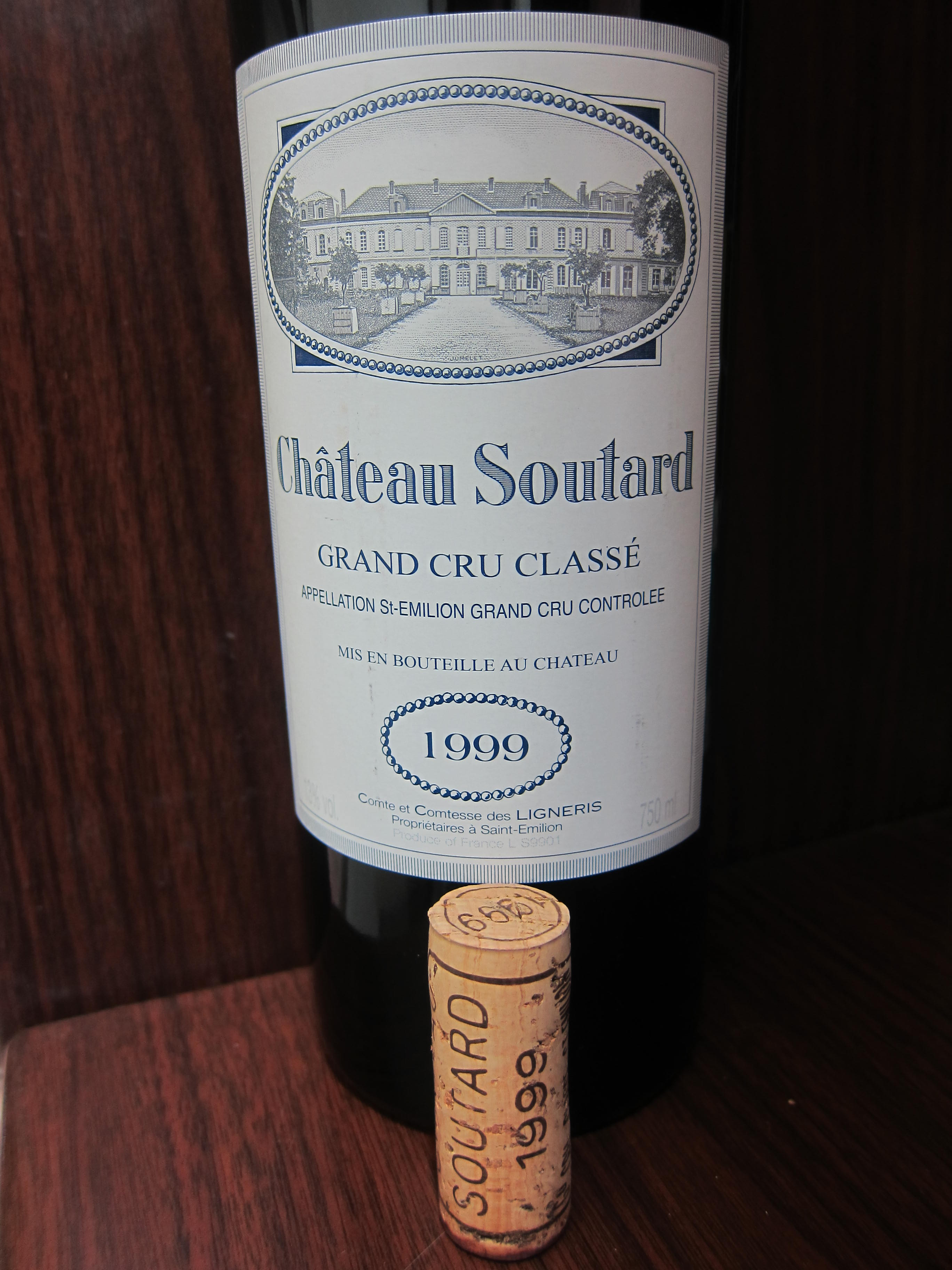
Chateau Soutard

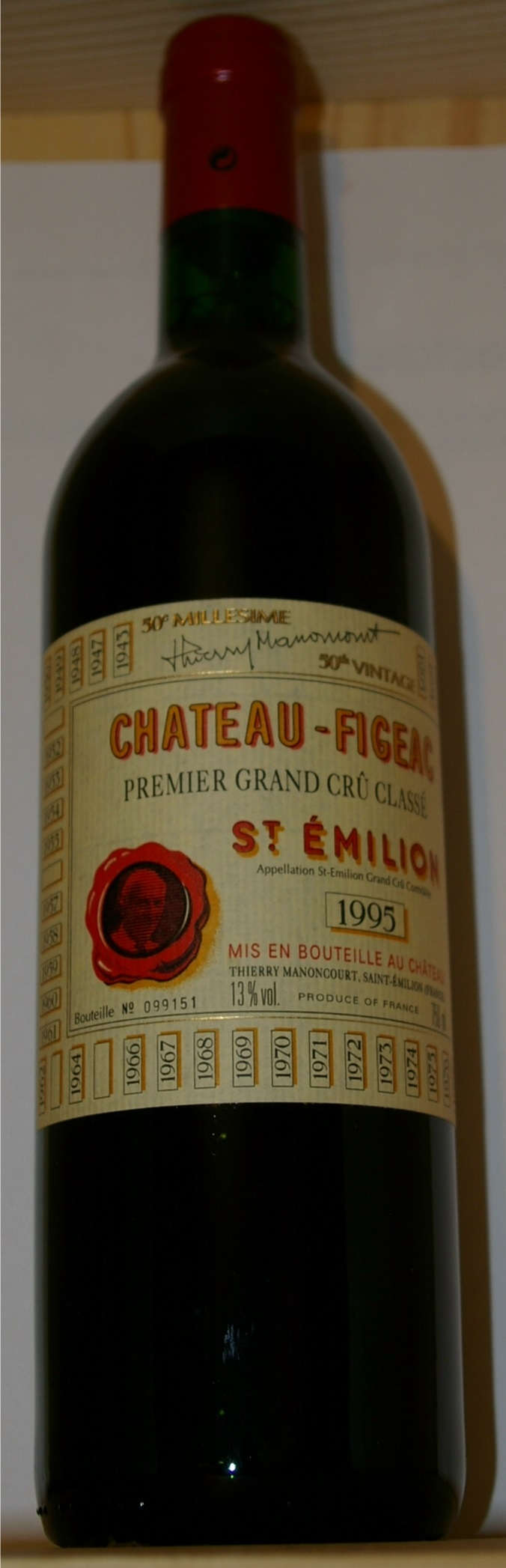
Château Figeac 1995, a Premiers grands crus classés wine (estate promoted to Premiers grands crus classés 'A' in 2022).

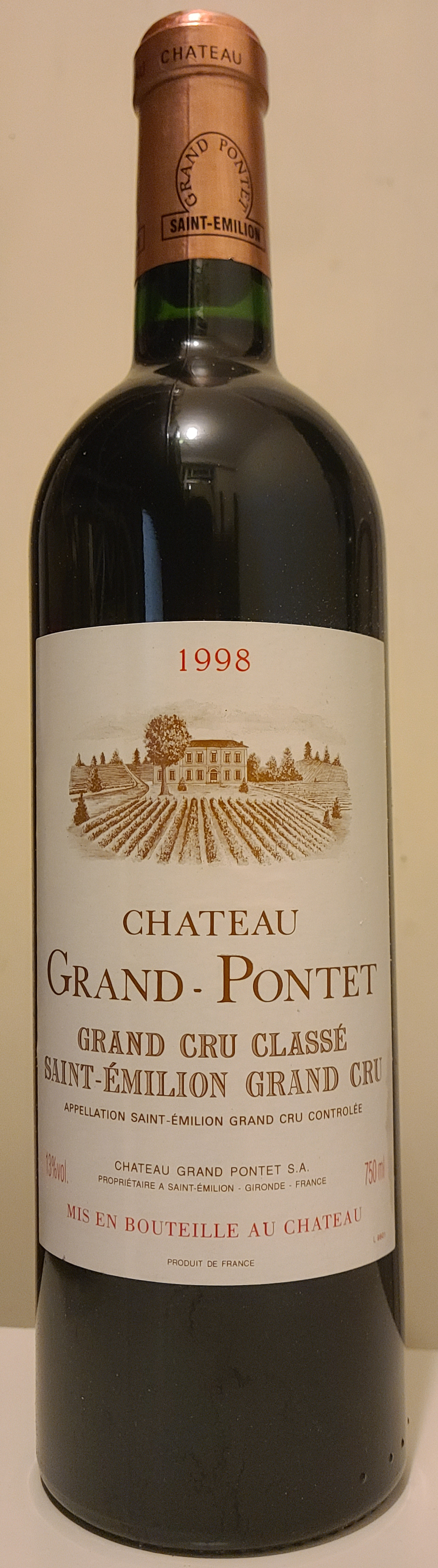
Chateau Grand Pontet 1998

In December 2008, the French senate had allowed the 8 demoted estates to regain their previous status, with Pavie-Macquin and Troplong Mondot returning to Premiers grands crus classés, while Bellefond-Belcier, Destieux, Fleur-Cardinale, Grand Corbin, Grand Corbin-Despagne, and Monbousquet again to become classified as Grands crus classés, as a result of several months of lobbying. However, in January 2009 this proposal was thrown out by the French government constitutional council.

In March 2009, it was stated that the French Court of Appeal had made a final ruling, that the 2006 Saint-Émilion classification will not stand, although the ultimate outcome was the opposite. A law passed on May 13, 2009, contained a footnote clarifying that the six chateaux promoted to Grand Cru Classe in 2006 would be able to keep their status with immediate effect, and date it back to the date of the classification, therefore the status of the classified estates of 1996, plus the eight chateaux promoted in 2006, was mandated by law until 2011, two years beyond what was previously scheduled.

== The 2012 classification ==
The 2012 classification was conducted differently than previous efforts, with tastings and inspections outsourced by INAO to independent groups with no involvement by St.-Emilion Wine Syndicate and Bordeaux wine trade, but instead wine professionals from Burgundy, the Rhône Valley, Champagne, the Loire Valley and Provence made up a seven-person commission. There is no longer a fixed number of châteaus which can be classified, and the new rankings elevated Château Pavie and Château Angélus to Premier Classe A. Among new Premiers grands crus were Larcis Ducasse, Canon-la-Gaffelière and garagiste producers Valandraud and La Mondotte, while Château Magdelaine was omitted from the list as it will be merged with Château Bélair-Monange. Château La Tour du Pin Figeac (Moueix) did not apply for the 2012 classification, as it was being merged with Chateau Cheval Blanc.

In January 2013, Château La Tour du Pin Figeac (Giraud-Bélivier), Chateau Croque-Michotte and Château Corbin-Michotte filed complaints with a Bordeaux administrative tribunal, claiming there were procedural errors in the selection process. Chateau La Tour du Pin Figeac, had previously challenged its demotion in the disputed 2006 classification without being reinstated in 2012, while Château Croque-Michotte was refused promotion from Grand cru to Grand cru classé. Having been classified as Grand cru classé since the inception of the ranking in 1955, Château Corbin Michotte was declassified in the 2012 ranking, but regained the Grand cru classé status in the 2022 classement.

== Classification ==
As of 2022 (through the 2031 harvest), the classification comprises 14 Premiers grands crus classés (2 'A', 12 'B') and 71 Grands crus classés.

Premier Grand Cru Classé 'A'
Château Pavie	Château Figeac^{[i]}
Premier Grand Cru Classé 'B'
Château Beauséjour (Duffau-Lagarrosse)	Château Beau-Séjour Bécot	Château Bélair-Monange
Château Canon	Château Canon-la-Gaffelière^{[d]}	Château Larcis Ducasse^{[d]}
Château Pavie-Macquin^{[a]}^{[d]}	Château Troplong Mondot^{[a]}	Château Trotte Vieille
Château Valandraud^{[d]}	Clos Fourtet	La Mondotte^{[d]}
Grand Cru Classé
Château Badette - promoted in 2022	Château Franc Mayne	Château Montlabert - promoted in 2022
Château Balestard La Tonnelle	Château Grand Corbin	Château Montlisse - promoted in 2022
Château Barde-Haut	Château Grand Corbin-Despagne	Château Moulin du Cadet
Château Bellefont-Belcier	Château Grand Mayne	Château Peby Faugères
Château Bellevue	Château Guadet	Château Petit Faurie de Soutard
Château Berliquet	Château Haut-Sarpe	Château Ripeau
Château Boutisse - promoted in 2022	Château Jean Faure	Château Rochebelle
Château Cadet-Bon	Château La Commanderie	Château Rol Valentin - promoted in 2022
Château Cap de Mourlin	Château La Confession - promoted in 2022	Château Saint-Georges (Côte Pavie)
Château Chauvin	Château La Couspaude	Château Sansonnet
Château Clos de Sarpe	Château La Croizille - promoted in 2022	Château Soutard
Château Corbin	Château La Dominique	Château Tour Baladoz - promoted in 2022
Château Corbin Michotte - promoted in 2022	Château La Fleur Morange	Château Tour Saint Christophe - promoted in 2022
Château Côte de Baleau	Château La Marzelle	Château Villemaurine
Château Croix de Labrie - promoted in 2022	Château La Serre	Château Yon-Figeac
Château Dassault	Château la Tour Figeac	Clos Badon Thunevin - promoted in 2022
Château de Ferrand	Château Laniote	Clos de l'Oratoire
Château de Pressac	Château Larmande	Clos des Jacobins
Château Destieux	Château Laroque	Clos Dubreuil - promoted in 2022
Château Faugères	Château Laroze	Clos Saint-Julien - promoted in 2022
Château Fleur Cardinale	Château Le Châtelet	Clos Saint-Martin
Château Fombrauge	Château Le Prieuré	Couvent des Jacobins
Château Fonplégade	Château Mangot - promoted in 2022	Lassègue - promoted in 2022
Château Fonroque	Château Monbousquet
Former Cru Classé
Château Angélus^{[g]}	Château Ausone^{[h]}	Château Cheval Blanc^{[g]}
Château La Tour du Pin Figeac (Giraud-Bélivier)^{[b]}^{[e]}	Château La Tour du Pin Figeac (Moueix)^{[b]}^{[f]}	Château La Gaffelière^{[h]}

== Other categories ==
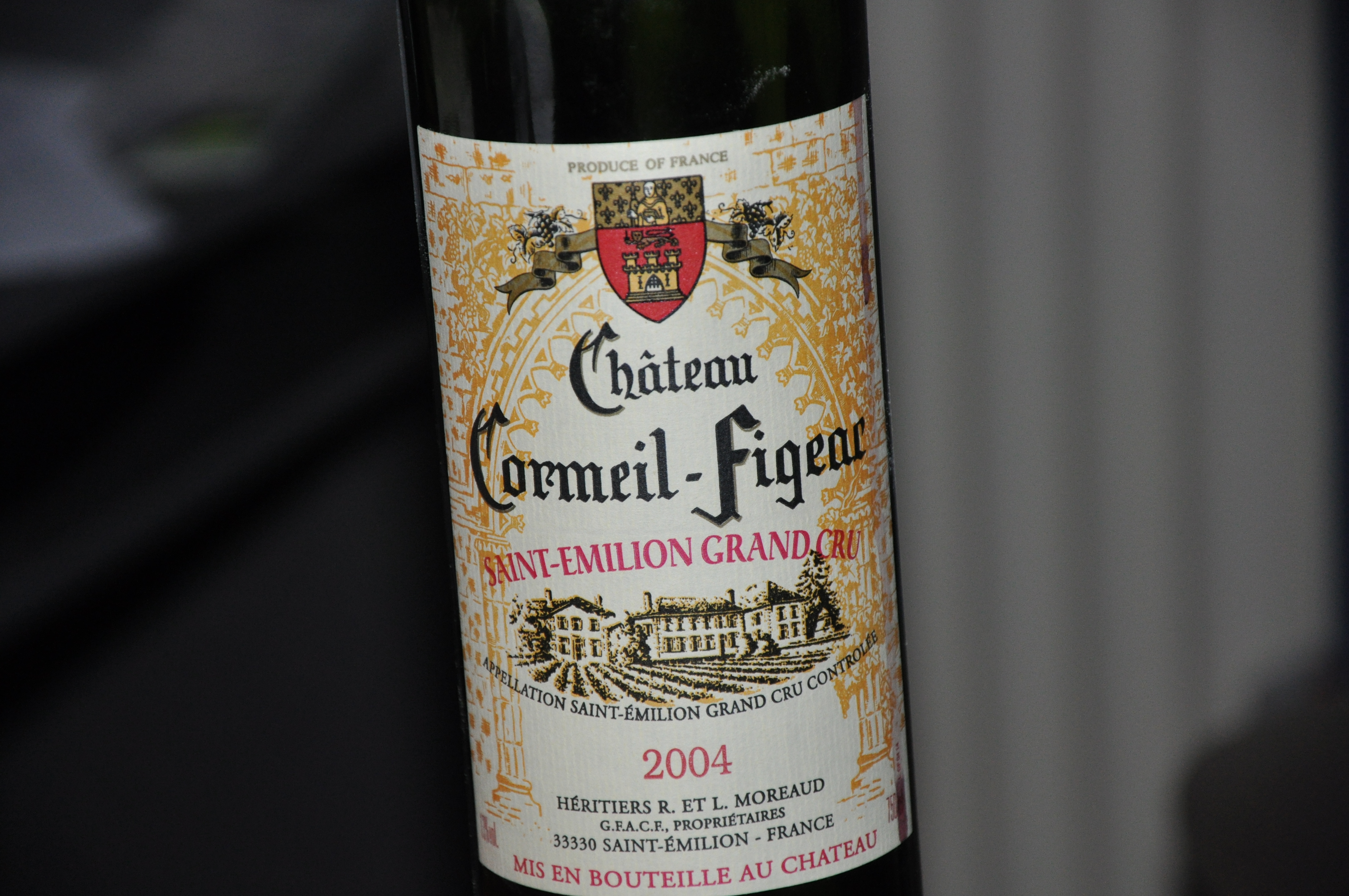
A Saint-Émilion labeled as simply "Grand Cru" which is not ranked under any formal appellation.

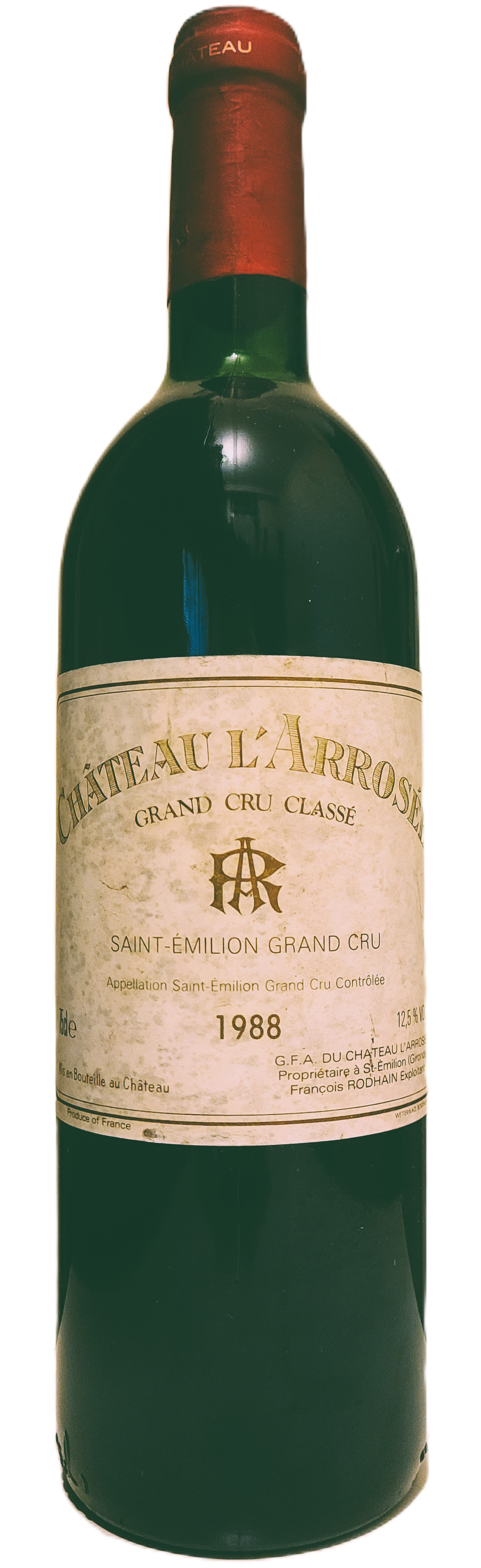
Château L'Arrosée

Over two hundred other Saint-Émilion wines carry the description "Grand Cru", however this designation is awarded under the basic appellation rules and is not part of the formal 1955 classification. Wines in this category are not seen as being of comparable quality to the Grand Cru Classés.

== See also ==
- Saint-Émilion AOC
- Regional wine classification
- Bordeaux wine regions
- History of Bordeaux wine

== Notes and references ==
a. Promoted to Premier grand cru classé in 2006 and relegated in 2008
b. Declassified in 2006 and reinstated in 2008
c. Classified in 2006 and declassified in 2008
d. Promoted in 2012
e. Demoted in 2012
f. Did not reapply for classification, ceased to exist and absorbed into Château Cheval Blanc in 2012
g. Withdrew in 2021.
h. Withdrew in 2022.
i. Promoted in 2022.

- Château la Clusière is no longer listed as it is now part of Château Pavie and Château Curé-Bon-la-Madeleine is no longer listed as it is now part of Château Canon.
- Chateau Guadet changed its name from Chateau Guadet-St Julien in 2005
- Château Cadet Piola is no longer listed as it is now part of Château Soutard, Château Bergat part of Trottevielle, Château Haut-Corbin part of Grand Corbin and Château Matras now partly in Canon.
- Château Magdelaine merged with Château Bélair-Monange.

General

- "Saint-Émilion 2022 classification list" (PDF). vins-saint-emilion.com

Footnotes
