= Château Figeac =

Wine estate in France

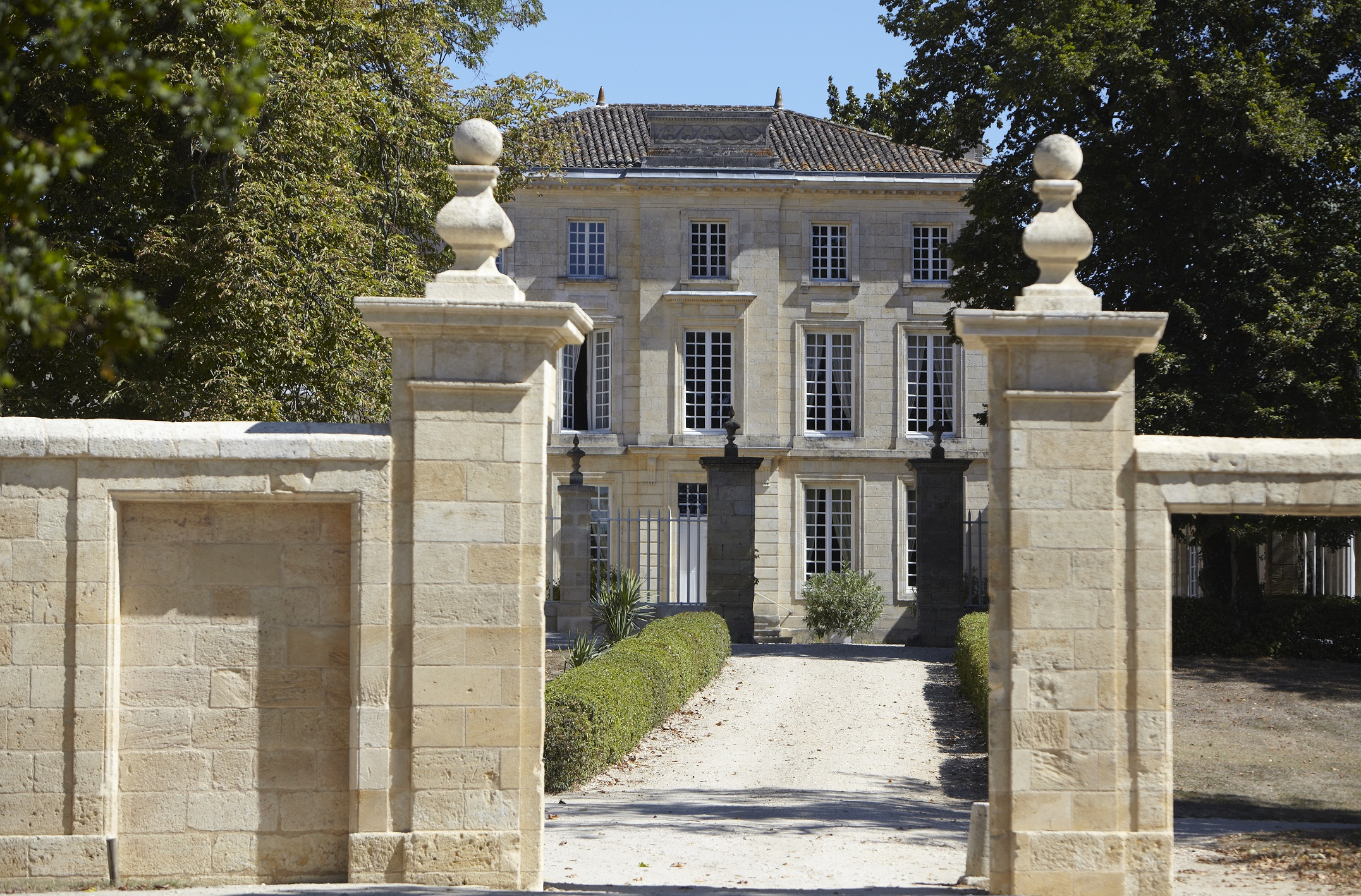
- Location: Saint-Émilion, France
- Coordinates: 44°54′46.20″N 0°11′32.73″W
- Wine region: Bordeaux
- Appellation: Saint-Émilion AOC, (Premier Grand Cru Classé)
- Key people: Thierry Manoncourt
- Cases/yr: 10 000
- Varietals: 35% cabernet franc, 35% cabernet sauvignon, 30% merlot
- Website: chateau-figeac.com

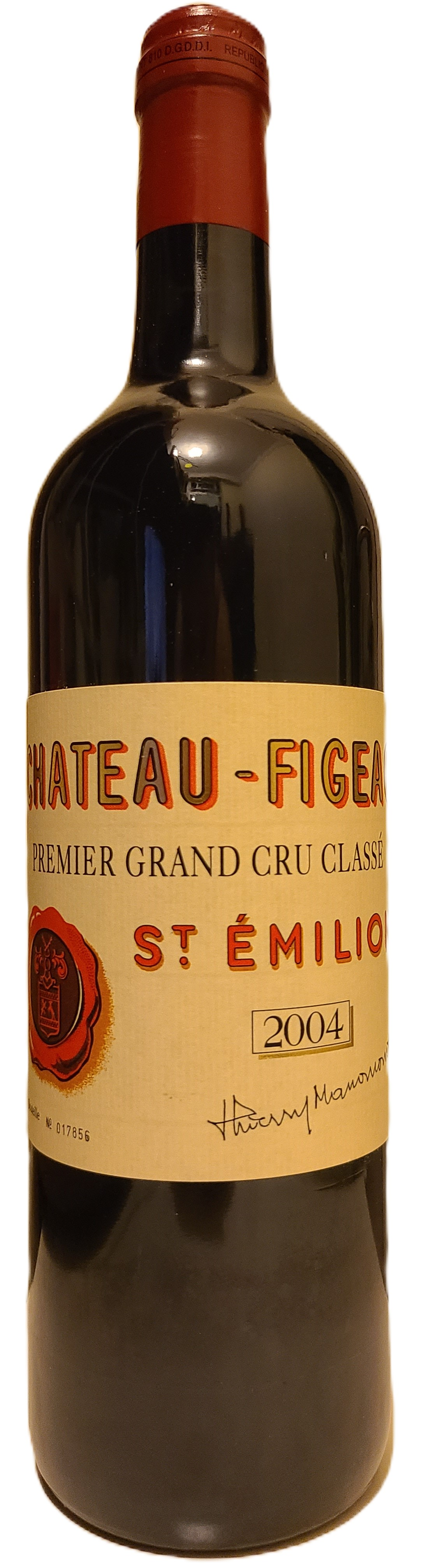
Chateau Figeac 2004

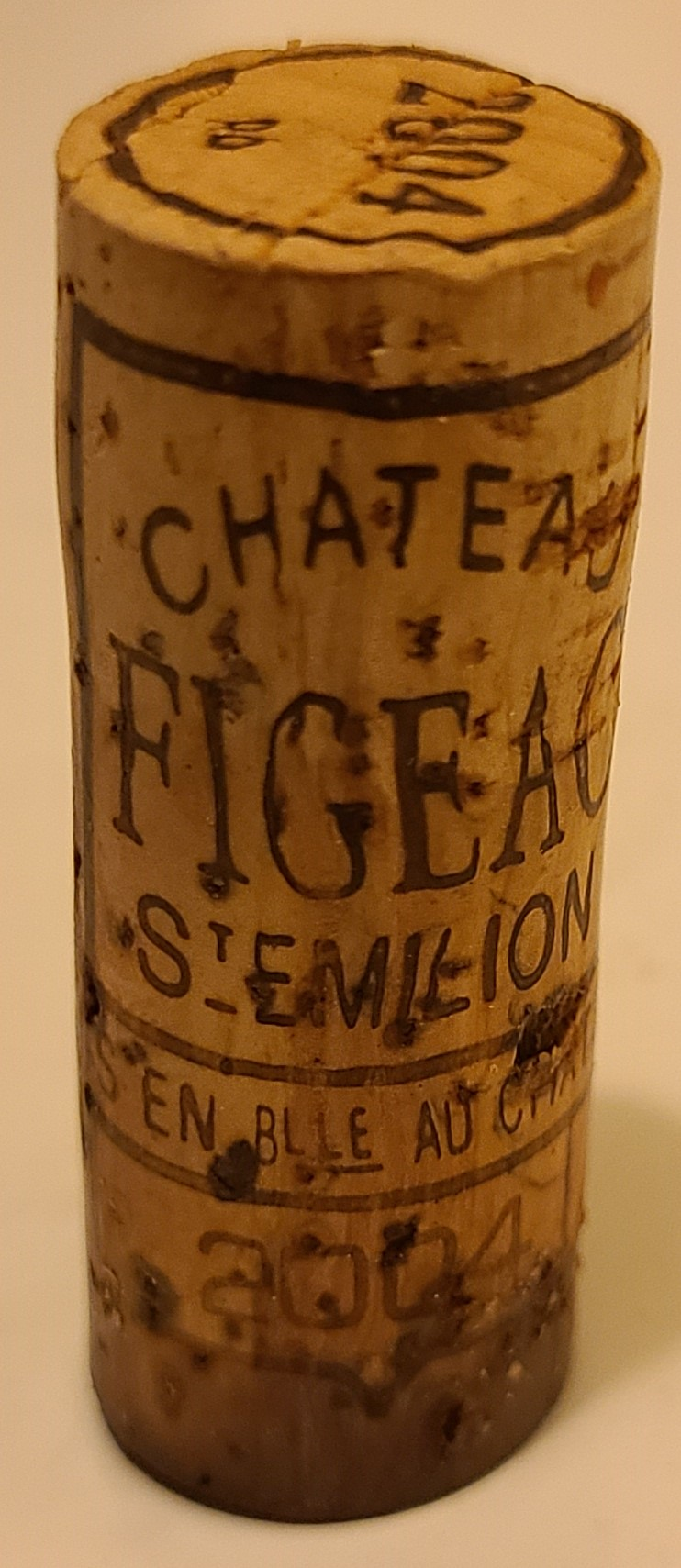
Cork

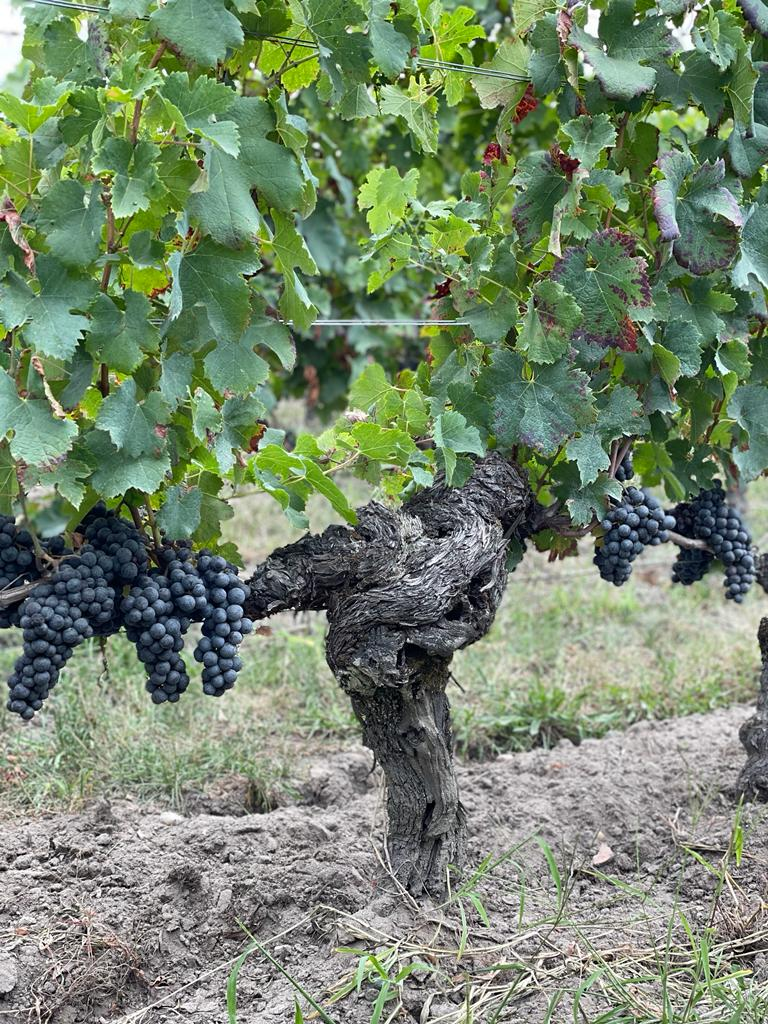
100-year-old Merlot vine at Château-Figeac

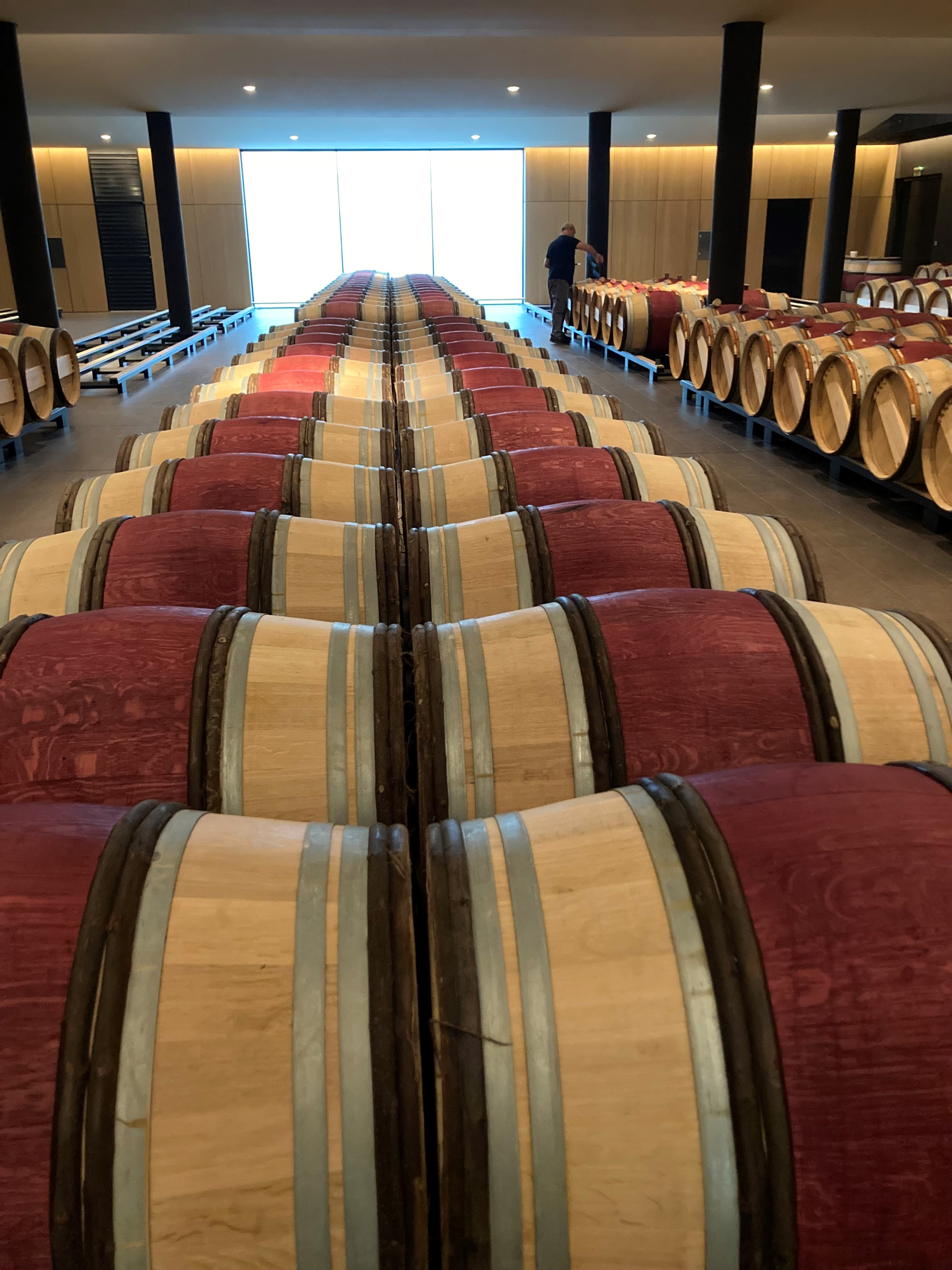
Barrique cellar of Château Figeac

Château-Figeac is a wine estate in the Saint-Émilion appellation of Bordeaux.

As of 2022, it is one of two chateaux to carry the highest rank (Premier Grand Cru Classé A) in the official Classification of Saint-Émilion wine (2022 classification, valid until 2031 harvest year).

It is among the largest estates in Saint-Émilion, comprising 54 hectares (130 acres) in one block, of which 41 hectares (100 acres) are vineyards. Due to its soil, which is dominated by gravel, it is planted in grape varieties Cabernet Sauvignon (35%), Cabernet Franc (35%), and Merlot (30%). Most other Saint-Émilion wines are dominated by Merlot, and Figeac therefore bears a certain semblance to the wines of Médoc and Graves despite being situated on Bordeaux's right bank. The wine, which is one of the most famous of Saint-Émilion, is aged in 100% new oak barrels.

From 1945 to 2011, the estate produced a second wine named La Grange Neuve de Figeac. From the 2012 vintage, the second wine of Figeac was rebranded as Petit-Figeac.

== History ==
Château-Figeac originates from an ancient estate that traces its roots back to the 2nd century, when a Gallo-Roman villa was built on the estate and named after a Figeacus. In the late 18th century, the property was close to 200 hectares (490 acres) in size, but was sold and subdivided several times in the 19th century until 1892, when Henri de Chevremont bought it. Henriette, the daughter of de Chevremont, married André Villepigue and became the owner of Figeac. The estate was managed by Alfred Maquin, as the Villepigues lived in Paris. In 1905, their son Robert Villepigue took over the running of the estate. After Henriette's death in 1942, it was unclear if Robert Villepigue or his sister Adda Elizabeth (who had married Antoine Manoncourt) would inherit the estate, but in 1946 it passed to Adda Elizabeth Manoncourt.

In January 1947, Thierry Manoncourt (son of Antoine and Adda Elizabeth Manoncourt), an agronomical engineer trained in Paris, took over the running of Château-Figeac, and it was under his leadership that the estate rose to the front ranks of Saint-Émilion estates. He was actively involved with the estate until his death in 2010, alongside his son-in-law Comte Eric d'Aramon, who was the Director from 1988 until 2013.

Since the passing of Thierry Manoncourt, his widow, Marie-France Manoncourt, the Honorary President of Château-Figeac, along with her family, has reenergized the estate with the appointment of Frédéric Faye (previously the technical director) as Managing Director. This new team notably oversaw the construction of new cellars. Constructed over 3 years, between 2018 and 2021, Château-Figeac's new cellars comprise 5,000 m2 of surface area over three levels, extending 12 meters underground.

== Terroir ==
Château-Figeac is situated in the north-west corner of the Saint-Emilion appellation, close to the Pomerol border. Its terroir is characterized by three Günzian gravel knolls of quartz and flint over a subsoil of iron-rich blue clay. This stands in distinct difference to the limestone-clay terroir on the plateau in the center of the appellation, where most Premiers Grands Crus Classés are located. The gravel soils allow for the planting of Cabernets, which can fully ripen due to the characteristics of this soil type: good drainage and reflected heat. Following the 1956 frost, Thierry Manoncourt replanted the vineyard to its current proportions : 35% Cabernet Sauvignon, 35% Cabernet Franc, and 30% Merlot.

== Unrelated wines ==
In 1879 the Château Figeac estate was subdivided in resulting in the formation of the now unrelated estate Château La Tour Figeac. This adjacent property carries the lower rank of 'Grand Cru Classé'. Later Château La Tour Figeac itself was subdivided in two stages resulting in the formation of the equally unrelated Château La Tour du Pin Figeac (Giraud-Bélivier) and Château La Tour du Pin Figeac (Moueix), the latter of which no longer exists having been absorbed into Château Cheval Blanc. Château la Tour du Pin Figeac (Giraud-Bélivier) is currently unclassified having lost its 'Grand Cru Classé' status in 2012. Several of the other St-Émilion estates with Figeac as part their names result from the 19th century subdivision of the old Figeac estate.
