= Château Cheval Blanc =

Wine producer in the Bordeaux region of France

Coordinates: 44.9195°N 0.1893°W

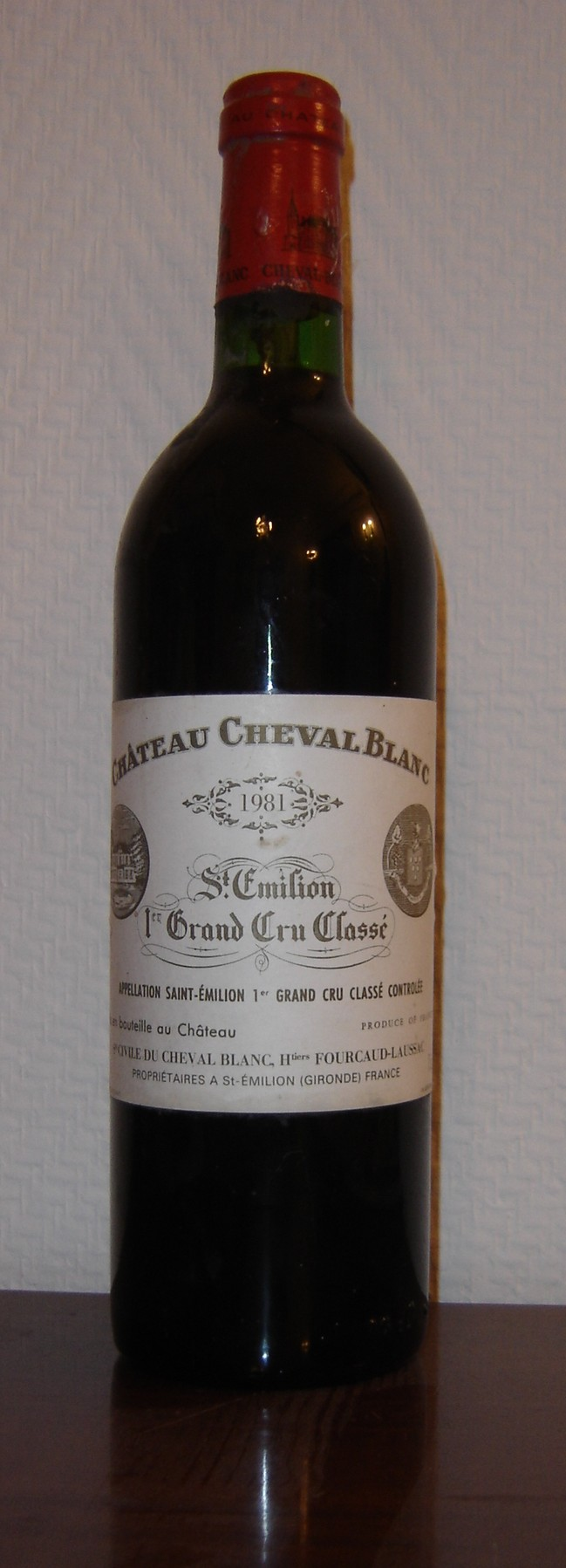
A bottle of the 1981 vintage of Château Cheval Blanc

Château Cheval Blanc (French for "White Horse Castle"), is a wine estate in Saint-Émilion in the Bordeaux wine region of France. Its wine holds the highest rank of Premier Grand Cru Classé (A) status in the Classification of Saint-Émilion wine from 1955.

== History ==
In 1832, Château Figeac sold 15 hectares (37 acres) to M. Laussac-Fourcaud, including part of the narrow gravel ridge that runs through Figeac and neighboring vineyards and reaches Château Pétrus just over the border in Pomerol. This became Château Cheval Blanc which, in the International London and Paris Exhibitions in 1862 and 1867, won medals still prominent on its labels.

The château remained in the family until 1998, when it was sold to Bernard Arnault, chairman of luxury goods group LVMH, and Belgian businessman Albert Frère, with Pierre Lurton installed as estate manager, a constellation similar to that of the group's other chief property Château d'Yquem. LVMH acquired Arnault's share in 2009.

== Vineyard ==
The vineyard is considered to have three qualities: one third Pomerol as it is located on the boundary, one third Graves as the soil is gravelly, and the remaining third typical Saint-Émilion. The vineyard area is spread over 41 hectares (100 acres), with 37 hectares (91 acres) planted with a composition of grape varieties of 57% Cabernet Franc, 40% Merlot, and small parcels of Malbec and Cabernet Sauvignon. The average annual production is 6000 cases of the Grand vin and 2500 cases of the second wine, Le Petit Cheval.

== Controversy ==
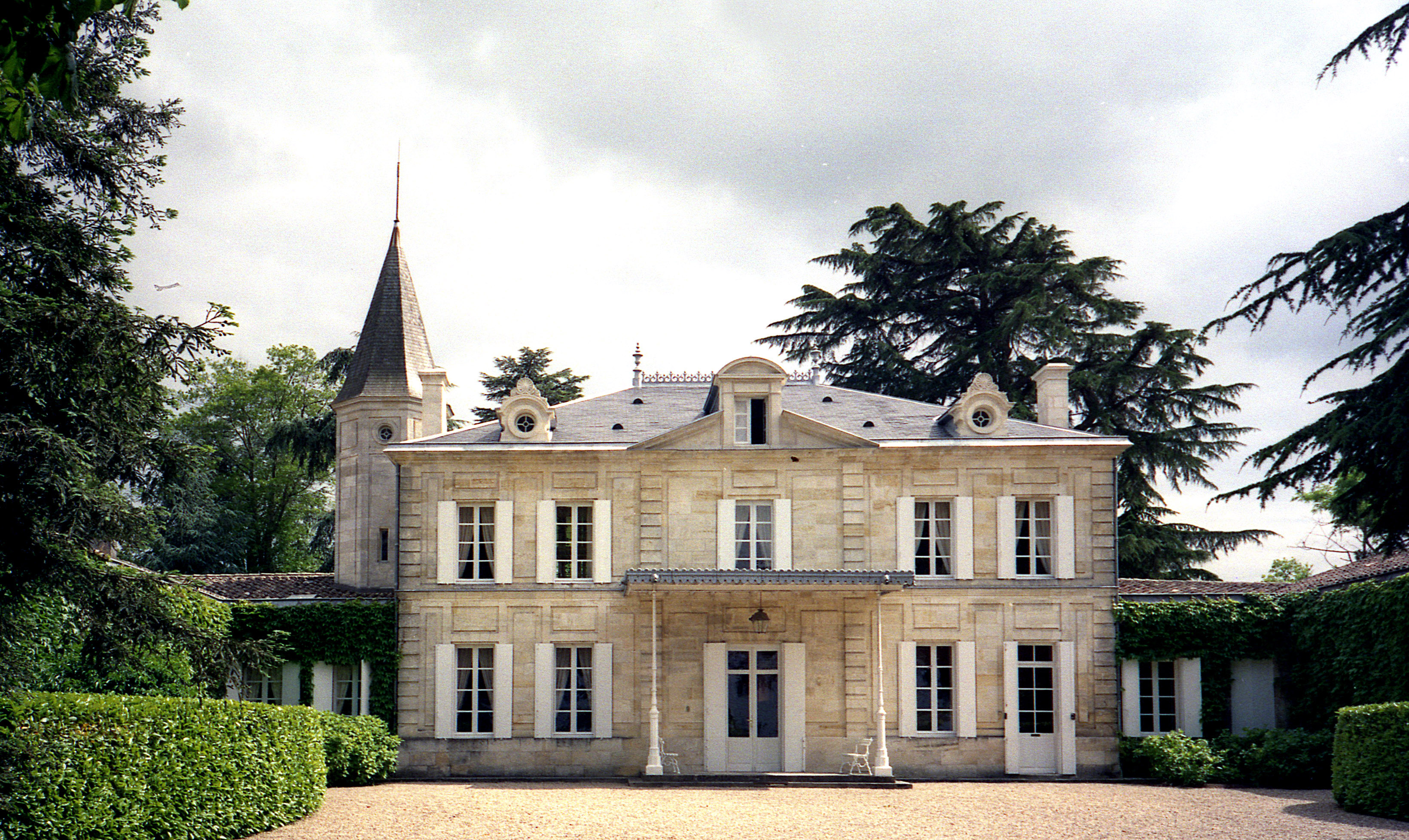
The Château Cheval Blanc

The manager of Château Cheval Blanc, Jacques Hebrard, was outraged at the evaluation of his 1981 vintage barrel samples made by influential wine critic Robert Parker and asked him to re-taste. Upon arriving, Parker was attacked by Hebrard's dog as the manager stood by and watched. When Parker asked for a bandage to stop the bleeding from his leg, Parker says Hebrard instead gave him a copy of the offending newsletter. Hebrard denies that Parker was bleeding.

However, Parker did retaste the wine and found it significantly changed from his previous evaluation; he therefore gave the wine an updated evaluation in a later issue of his publication The Wine Advocate.

== In popular culture ==
The Rumpole of the Bailey Series 4 episode "Rumpole and the Blind Tasting" deals with a large shipment of Château Cheval Blanc found in the garage of a minor South London fence, a regular client of Rumpole's, with the fence claiming he had no idea how it got there. The wine later proved not to be Château Cheval Blanc but rather cheap plonk in used Château Cheval Blanc bottles, as part of a scheme to commit insurance fraud; the bottles were shown to have been planted in the fence's garage by the wine merchant who owned the bottles, with the intent of reporting the bottles as stolen in order to claim the large insurance payment from the total loss of the wine.

The film Sideways features the Cheval Blanc 1961 vintage as a plot element, despite the main character's stated aversion to Merlot and dismissive statements about Cabernet Franc.

Sean Connery drinks Château Cheval Blanc in the 1983 James Bond movie Never Say Never Again.

In the 1990s film Naked Gun 33 1/3: The Final Insult, after Frank is thrown in prison, he starts a prison riot in the cafeteria with a rousing speech complaining about the prisoners' accommodations, including, "This Chateau LeBlanc '68 is supposed to be served slightly chilled! This is room temperature!" The filmmakers slightly altered the name of the wine, fearing its owners would not want their product used in a spoof film.

Restaurant critic Anton Ego, voiced by Peter O'Toole in the 2007 Disney film Ratatouille, orders a bottle of Cheval Blanc 1947 to accompany "some fresh, clear, well-seasoned perspective".

In the 2008 film Bottle Shock, which tells the story of Chateau Montelena, actor Freddy Rodriguez, depicting Gustavo Brambila, correctly guesses the 1947 Cheval Blanc in a blind taste at a dare in a bar.

In an episode of Frasier (season 5, episode 19 "Frasier Gotta Have It") Niles (played by David Hyde Pierce) asks "What kind of weak-willed man allows a woman to come between him and a 1981 Cheval Blanc?" In season 7 episode 17 "Whine Club", Niles' girlfriend Mel (Jane Adams) gives Niles a bottle of 1961 Cheval Blanc, with perhaps less remark about the special vintage than might be expected.

In a 2008 novel by Jan Guillou, Men inte om det gäller din dotter ("But Not If it Concerns Your Daughter"), Cheval Blanc 1982 is used as a recognition code between the protagonist Carl Hamilton and journalist Erik Ponti.

In Blake Crouch's 2019 novel Recursion, Marcus Slade and Helena share a bottle of '47 Cheval Blanc to celebrate a recent shared scientific breakthrough.

In the Apple TV series, Drops of God 2023, Cheval Blanc is used in a blind taste test between the two protagonists.
