= Château Valandraud =

Coordinates: 44.8878°N 0.0855°W

Château Valandraud, or Château de Valandraud, is Bordeaux wine producer situated in the Saint-Émilion appellation, promoted to Premier Grand Cru Classé in the 2012 Classification of Saint-Emilion wine. The winery is located on the Right Bank of France’s Bordeaux wine region in the commune of Saint-Émilion.

The winery also produces the second wines, Virginie de Valandraud and 3 de Valandraud, and the Kosher wine Château Valandraud Kosher.

== History ==
In 1989 Jean-Luc Thunevin and his wife Murielle Andraud bought a 0.6-hectare (1.5-acre) plot in Saint-Émilion near Château Pavie-Macquin. Further plots in the region were acquired over the years, in locations such as Saint-Sulpice-de-Faleyrens and Saint-Étienne-de-Lisse, and a former garage to be used as a winery, releasing the first vintage in 1991 of 1,500 bottles priced at €13. Exemplified as a typical "microchâteau", Thunevin is closely associated with the "garagiste" movement, and the wine is described as the pioneer "Vin de garage". In 1995, Valandraud was given a better rating by Robert Parker than Château Pétrus, and by 1997 the Valandraud bottle price was set at €91. The 2005 vintage was set at €165.

The Thunevins have since taken on several projects, including the first "garage wine"' of Médoc, Marojallia, and acting as négociant distributor for several estates from Bordeaux, Languedoc-Roussillon and elsewhere, including Château Ausone, Gracia, Harlan Estate and Dominio de Pingus.

Jean-Luc Thunevin is among the wine personalities satirised next to Robert Parker in the 2010 bande dessinée comic book, Robert Parker: Les Sept Pêchés capiteux.

== Production ==
The vineyard area currently extends 4.5 hectares (11 acres), with the grape varieties composed of 65% Merlot, 30% Cabernet Franc, 5% Cabernet Sauvignon and 5% Malbec. The annual production of the Grand Vin is typically 15,000 to 20,000 bottles.

Other labels produced include the Virginie de Valandraud, 3 de Valandraud, Château Valandraud Kosher, Blanc de Valandraud N° 1 and N° 2, Bad Boy, and the declassified non-vintage vin de table L’Interdit de V……d which was not allowed by INAO to vintage date the 2000 harvest or be designated as a Saint-Émillion wine.
