= Puisseguin =

- Commune
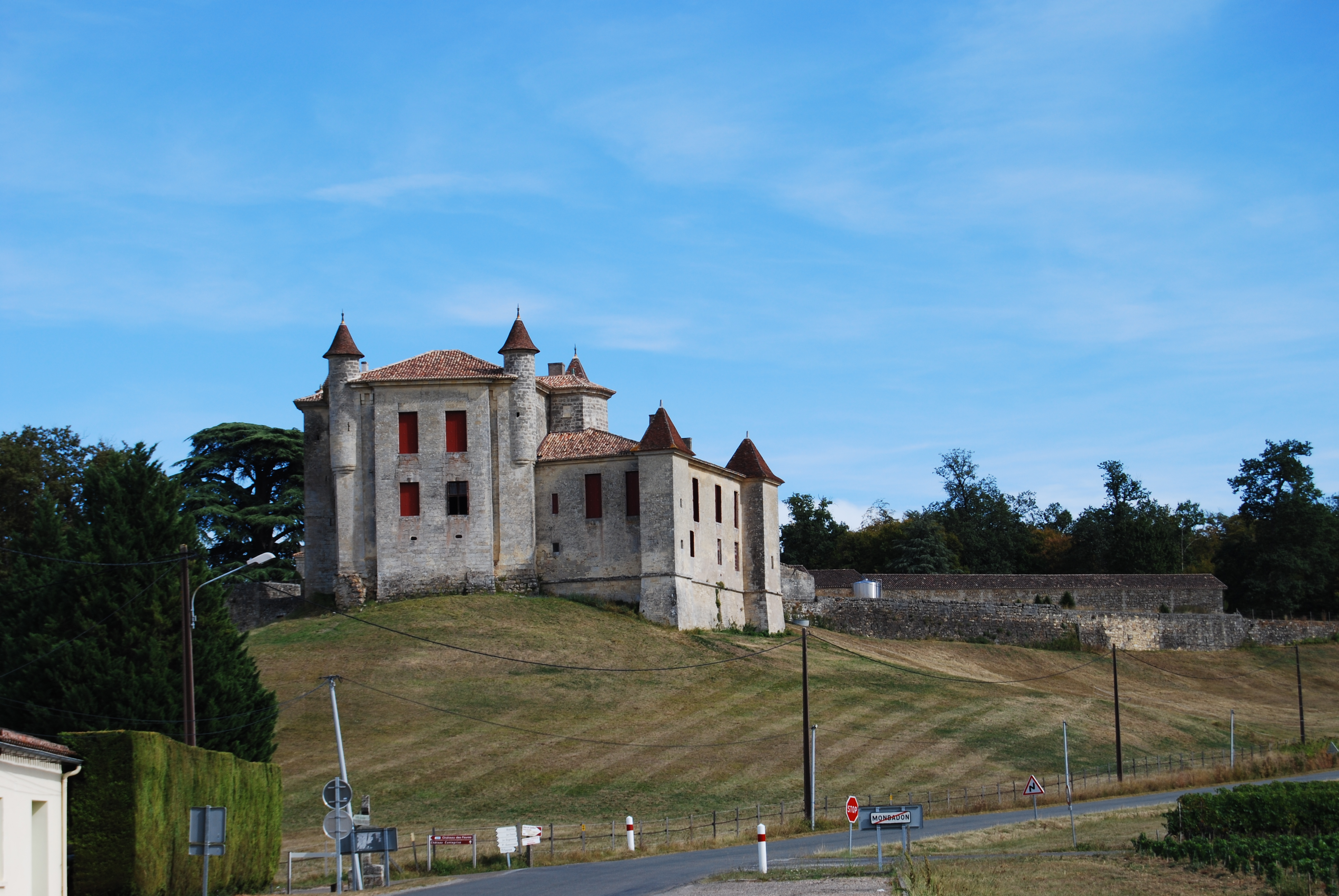
- Chateau of Monbadon

- Coat of arms
- Location of Puisseguin
- Location within France Location within Nouvelle-Aquitaine
- Coordinates: 44°55′28″N 0°04′19″W
- Country: France
- Region: Nouvelle-Aquitaine
- Department: Gironde
- Arrondissement: Libourne
- Canton: Le Nord-Libournais
- Intercommunality: Grand Saint-Émilionnais

Government
  - Mayor (2020–2026): Jean Michel Pasquon
- Area^{1}: 17.25 km^{2} (6.66 sq mi)
- Elevation: 83 m (272 ft)
- Highest elevation: 108 m (354 ft)
- Lowest elevation: 38 m (125 ft)
- Population (2023): 834
  - Density: 48.3/km^{2} (125/sq mi)
- Time zone: UTC+01:00 (CET)
  - Summer (DST): UTC+02:00 (CEST)
- INSEE/Postal code: 33342 /33570
- ^{1} French Land Register data, which excludes lakes, ponds, glaciers > 1 km^{2} (0.386 sq mi or 247 acres) and river estuaries.

Puisseguin (French pronunciation: [pɥis(ə)ɡɛ̃]; Occitan: Puègseguin) is a commune in the Gironde department in Nouvelle-Aquitaine in southwestern France. It is around 15 km east of Libourne. In 1989 it absorbed the former commune Monbadon.

In October 2015, 43 people died in a crash between a bus and a lorry.

== Geography ==
Located in the Pays du Libournais.

=== Bordering municipalities ===
The neighboring towns are Lussac in the north, Tayac in the extreme north-east for about 250 meters, Saint-Cibard to the East, Saint-Philippe-d'Aiguille at the South-East, Saint-Genès-de-Castillon at the South and Montagne in the west.

== Population ==
Population data refer to the area corresponding with the commune as of January 2025.

Historical population
| Year | Pop. | ±% p.a. |
|---|---|---|
| 1968 | 1,215 | — |
| 1975 | 1,165 | −0.60% |
| 1982 | 1,107 | −0.73% |
| 1990 | 1,038 | −0.80% |
| 1999 | 924 | −1.28% |
| 2007 | 891 | −0.45% |
| 2012 | 861 | −0.68% |
| 2017 | 856 | −0.12% |
| 2023 | 834 | −0.43% |
Source: INSEE

== See also ==
- Puisseguin-Saint-Émilion AOC
- Communes of the Gironde department
- Puisseguin road crash
