= Puisseguin-Saint-Émilion AOC =

Wine region in Bordeaux, France

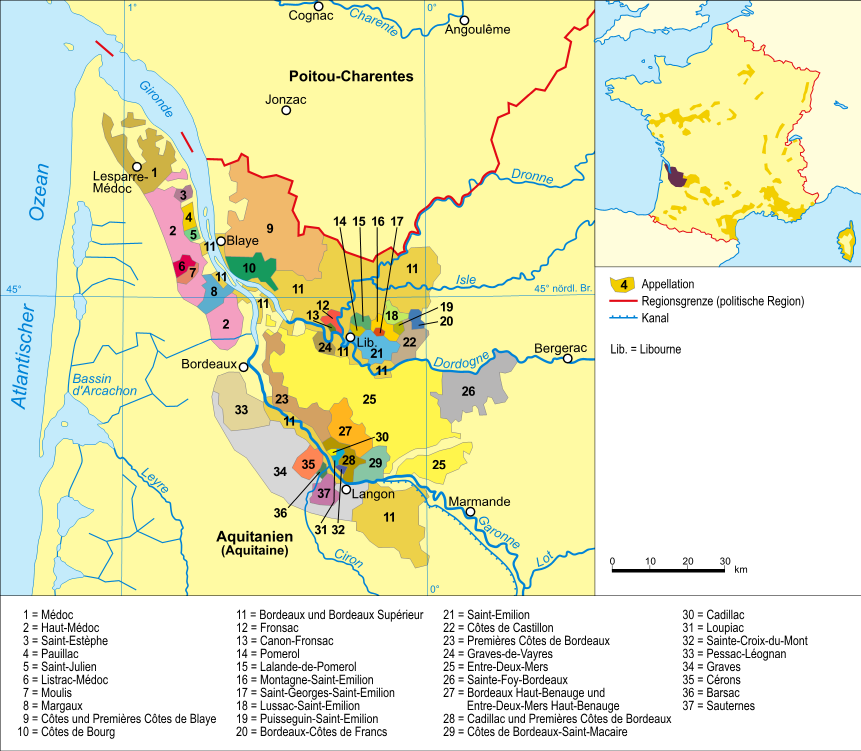
The Bordeaux wine region. Puisseguin-Saint-Émilion is number 19.

Puisseguin-Saint-Émilion (French pronunciation: [pɥisɡɛ̃ sɛ̃t‿emiljɔ̃]) is an Appellation d'origine contrôlée (AOC) for wine in the Bordeaux wine region of France, where it is situated in the Libourne subregion on the right bank of the Dordogne. It was granted AOC status on 14 November 1936, and the AOC designation granted to the wines which have been harvested on the land of the Puisseguin commune. 753 hectares (1,860 acres) of vine planted areas have belonged to the appellation in 2005, with a production of 34,648 hl.

Puisseguin-Saint-Émilion only produces red wine, and nearly all of the grape varieties from Bordeaux can be and are used, such as Cabernet Sauvignon, Cabernet Franc, Merlot, Côt, etc., although it is Merlot that is used most often.

Like the vineyards of Montagne, the vineyards of Puisseguin are located in the area northeast of Saint-Émilion on the right bank of the Barbanne. Together with Lussac-Saint-Émilion, Saint-Georges-Saint-Émilion and Montagne-Saint-Émilion, it is one of the "satellites" of Saint-Émilion.

The base yield is fixed at 45 hl/hectare with a limit of 20%. Before the chaptalization and concentration process, the must (the residue of grapes, after the juice has been extracted) must contain a minimum of 187g/L of natural sugar. After fermentation, the wine must have a minimum alcohol level of 11% vol.

== Grape varieties ==
Traditionally, the wines of Puisseguin-Saint-Émilion are a collection of different grape varieties. The three main varieties being Merlot, Cabernet Franc and Cabernet Sauvignon:

- Merlot - the most dominant grape variety, accounting for 80% of the planted area. It is a variety that ripens early, and needs cool and humid conditions as well as soil rich in clay. It ripens well and gives wine its colour, a good alcoholic richness, a full bodied texture and is smooth and round on the palette.
- Cabernet Franc - an important element of the Libourne plantations and represents nearly 15% of the blend at Saint-Émilion. Of medium precocity, it is grown mostly in chalky or quite warm soils. It gives the wine an aromatic flavour, lightly spiced, with a coolness and tannic structure, giving the wine an aged flavour.
- Cabernet Sauvignon - representing around 5% of the plantations, it is a grape that is particularly adapted to warm and dry soil (gravel, sand, clay or chalky soil). It gives wine a gently spiced flavour, complex with a tannic richness, favourable to its long and harmonious preservation.

The AOC regulations for Puisseguin-Saint-Émilion also allows the use of two other grape varieties: the Malbec (or côt) and the Carménère. Only the Malbec grape is still used.
