= Jeffrey Davies (wine merchant) =

American wine merchant based in Bordeaux

Jeffrey Davies is an American wine merchant based in Bordeaux. Running the company Signature Selections, Davies imports producers such as Château Pavie, Château Monbousquet, Gracia, Château Quinault, Château Reignac and Dominio de Pingus.

Davies has been characterized as a merchant who "scouts out wine producers of small amounts and outstanding wines", while Mike Steinberger has described him as "a warm, instantly likable Californian, ..married to a Bordelaise and has lived in France for most of the last 30 years".

After studying oenology at the University of Bordeaux under Émile Peynaud, Davies initially wrote for the Les Amis du Vin magazine. Writing in 2011, Robert Parker attests to its influence: "I knew of him long before I ever met him (in 1983 at a little chateau in Pomerol)...he was the European writer/Bordeaux expert for the defunct Les Amis du Vin magazine...the first serious wine magazine, and in its day, excellent...Jeffrey's reports from Bordeaux were part of my required reading long before I left the practice of law to pursue the unlikely dream of wine criticism...his reports turned out to be remarkably accurate....I always will wonder what if Les Amis du Vin magazine hadn't floundered and failed (it truly was way ahead of its time), and Jeffrey stayed there to become the world's leading writer on the wines of Bordeaux."

On his early period working as a Bordeaux negociant, Davies has described how he first started trading in Bordeaux, he attempted it directly without using courtiers, but château owners refused to do business with him until he "went through the correct channels".

Also a wine writer, Davies published in 2005 in The World of Fine Wine, "Bordeaux: Old World Vins Technologiques?". In response to two groups of criticism, British wine writers and Jonathan Nossiter with his controversial 2004 documentary Mondovino who accuse many Bordeaux winemakers of manufacturing vins technologiques, and those who contend that Bordeaux is decreasing in importance.

In his book, Bordeaux: The Wines, The Vineyards, The Winemakers (2009) the well-known British wine writer, Oz Clarke wrote of his status as insider: "If I really want to find out what's going on at the sharp end in Bordeaux, I would probably be spending my time with an American, Jeffrey M. Davies."

Davies was among the wine personalities satirized next to Robert M. Parker, Jr. in the bande dessinée comic book Robert Parker: Les Sept Pêchés capiteux. Davies expressed to Decanter that he was "disappointed" with the comic book for reasons other than that his name was misspelled. He stated, "It is not funny, and it’s full of inaccuracies and errors", and compared it to the 2007 book Robert Parker: Anatomie d'un Mythe by Hanna Agostini which he contends was written "out of spite and vengeance".

Interviewing Davies on Wine Library TV in 2007, Gary Vaynerchuk referred to him as a “legend” and “pioneer” saying: “When this guy talks, I listen.” The episode explored Davies’ career in wine - both in Bordeaux and the US.

Commenting on the effect of Robert Parker's "Parker point system" in the global wine market, Davies has said, "Below 90 you can’t sell it. Above 95, you can’t find it."

Davies is also an owner of the wine domaine, Clos des Truffiers
