= Château Teyssier =

French winery

Coordinates: 44.85254°N 0.15748°W

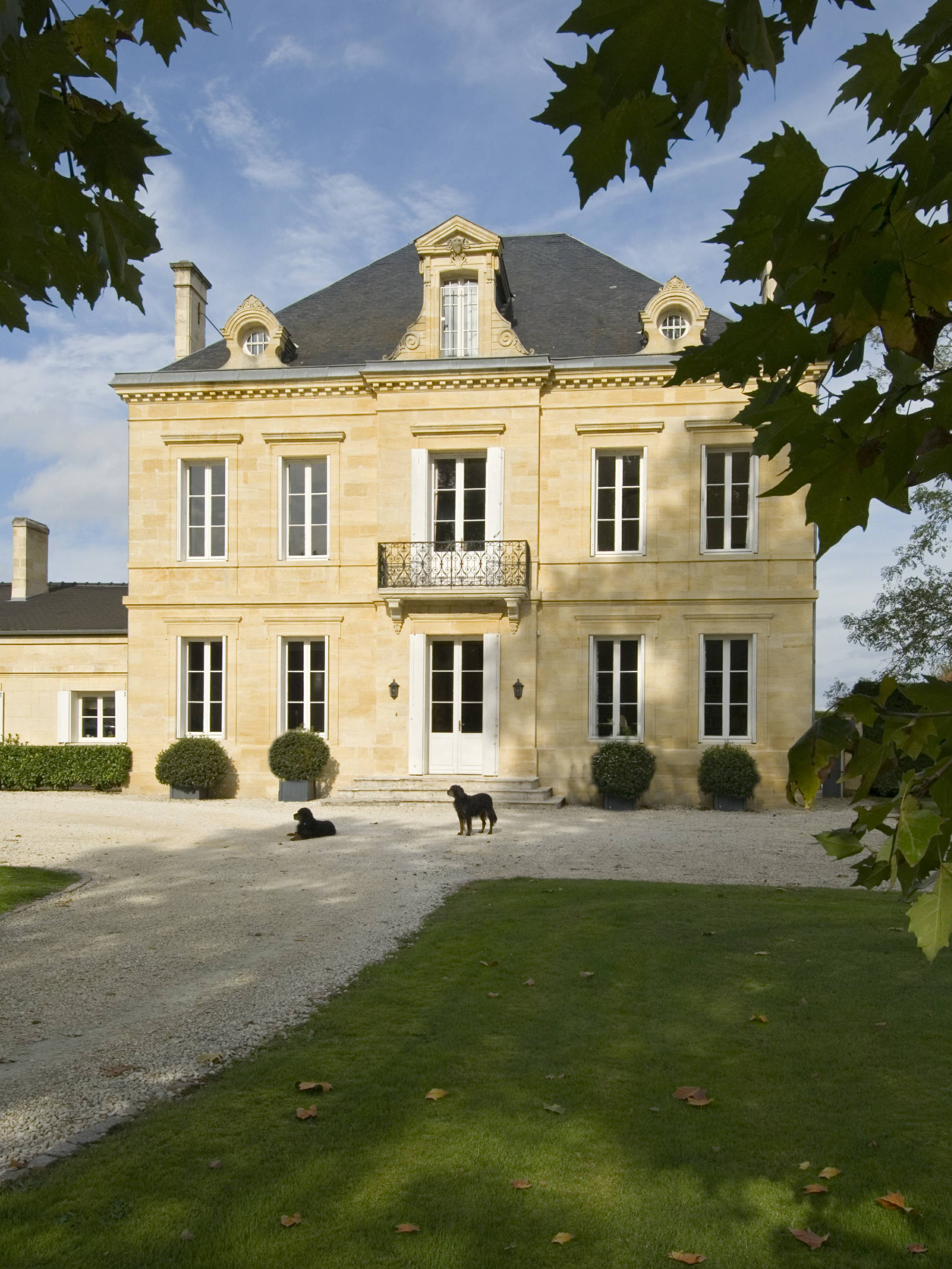
Château Teyssier

Château Teyssier is a Bordeaux wine producer from the appellation Saint-Émilion, whose grand vin is ranked Grand cru in the Classification of Saint-Émilion wine. The winery is located in the Right Bank of France's Bordeaux wine region in the commune of Vignonet, in the department Gironde.

In addition to its Grand vin Château Teyssier, the estate produces the "super-cuvées" Le Dôme, Vieux Château Mazerat, Les Astéries, Le Carré, Clos Nardian as single vineyard wines and the estate wine Château Laforge as well as the generic Bordeaux appellation line Pezat.

== History ==
The estate was predominantly a farm in the 18th century until it was acquired by the historian Jules Roy in 1869, who constructed the château and structured the vineyards. Château Teyssier was reduced to a neglected 5 hectare estate when Jonathan and Lyn Maltus arrived in 1994. The new owners modernised the winery and cellar, constructed a second winery and acquired additional plots in Vignonet, Saint-Sulpice-de-Faleyrens and Saint-Émilion.

Jonathan Maltus, frequently termed a "Garagiste" and "Cult winemaker" collaborates with the oenologist Neil Whyte and consultant oenologist Gilles Pauquet. Among Maltus' other winemaking projects was The Colonial Estate in Barossa Valley and Eden Valley incorporating some vines previously used for Penfolds Grange, producing labels such as Exile, and Émigré. His involvement there ended in 2009. A venture in Napa Valley produced its first wines in 2011 under the Estate name, World's End.

In February 2008, Maltus acquired the remainder of Vieux Château Mazerat, neighboring estate of Château Angélus, adding 6 hectares (15 acres) to the plot bought in 1996 which produces the fruit for Le Dôme.

== Production ==
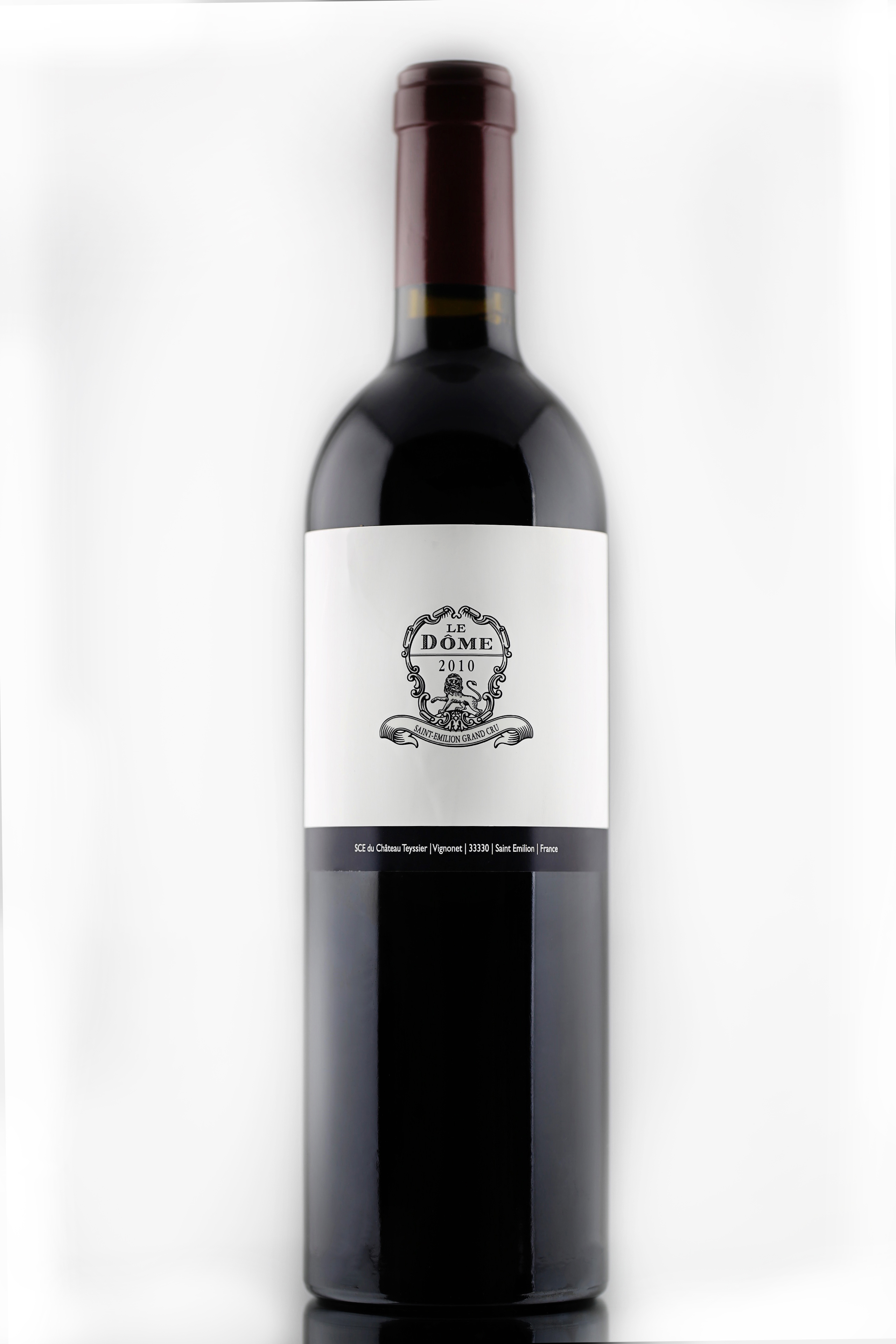
Le Dôme 2010

With the vineyards Destieu, Teyssier, Labrie, Largenbeau, Despagne, Le Boutail and Grand Champ de Biche, the expanded vineyard area for the production of Château Teyssier grand vin extends nearly 30 hectares (74 acres), with the grape variety distribution of ca. 85% Merlot and 15% Cabernet Franc. There is typically an annual production of 10,000 to 12,000 cases (900 to 1,080 hL).

The estate also has a production of generic Bordeaux appellation wine. The Bordeaux supérieur red Pezat, produced since 2005 from a Saint-Sulpice-de-Faleyrens 7.75-hectare (19.2-acre) vineyard La Plagnolle, made up of 85% Merlot and 15% Cabernet Franc has an annual production of 2,500 cases (220 hL). Pezat White consists of Sémillon, Sauvignon blanc and Muscadelle from the 1.20-hectare (3.0-acre) plot Rougerie and the 1.80-hectare (4.4-acre) plot Montet, and has an annual production of 1,000 cases (90 hL). A Pezat Rosé is also produced since 2006 as an expression of saignée of Saint Emilion Grand Crus, with a production of 1,500 cases (130 hL).

=== Le Dôme ===
From parcels located near Château Canon, Château Beau-Séjour Bécot and Château Angélus which were previously part of Vieux Chateau Mazerat, an unclassified vineyard though rated by David Peppercorn, production began in 1996 by "garagiste" principles.

Composed of 80% Cabernet Franc and 20% Merlot, the vineyard area totals 3.2 hectares (7.9 acres).

There is an annual production of 1,600 cases (30 hL) Le Dôme.

=== Vieux Château Mazerat ===
A 2008 acquisition added the remainder of the available Vieux Chateau Mazerat property to Maltus' holdings. Composed of 80% Merlot and 20% Cabernet Franc, the vineyard area extends 3.30 hectares (8.2 acres).

=== Les Astéries ===
The micro-cuvée Les Astéries produced since the 2004 vintage is made with fruit from a 1.2-hectare (3.0-acre) plot acquired from Château Fonroque located next to Clos Fourtet. The vineyard is composed of 80% Merlot and 20% Cabernet Franc, with some vines survivors of the 1956 frost.

There is an annual production of 250 cases (23 hL) of Les Astéries.

=== Le Carré ===
The micro-cuvée Le Carré produced since the 2005 vintage hails from a ca. 1.10-hectare (2.7-acre) plot acquired from Château Canon, also adjacent to Clos Fourtet. The vineyard is composed of 88% Merlot and 12% Cabernet Franc.

There is annually made 300 cases (27 hL) of Le Carré.

=== Le Nardian ===
Since 2000 vintage there has been produced a micro-cuvée of dry white wine, unusually for the district, from a plot in the commune of Saint-Aubin-de-Branne. The vineyard extends 1.40 hectares (3.5 acres) and consists of 40% Sauvignon blanc, 40% Sémillon and 20% Muscadelle.

There is annually produced 300 cases of Clos Nardian.

=== Château Laforge ===
Though not a single vineyard wine, the estate wine Château Laforge is produced since 1998 in a similar style of the super-cuvées. The vineyard area consists of several vineyards: the 1.05-hectare (2.6-acre) plot Grand Pontet, the 2.10-hectare (5.2-acre) plot Mauvinon, the 5.70-hectare (14.1-acre) plot Destieu, and the 1.35-hectare (3.3-acre) plot Rouchonne. The grape variety distribution is ca. 90% Merlot and 10% Cabernet Franc.

The annual production of Château Laforge is between 1,500 to 2,000 cases (130 to 180 hL).
