= Robert Parker: Les Sept Pêchés capiteux =

Robert Parker: Les Sept Péchés capiteux Robert Parker: The Seven Heady Sins
- Cover of the French edition
- Publisher: 12 bis

Creative team
- Writers: Benoist Simmat
- Artists: Philippe Bercovici

Original publication
- Date of publication: October 7, 2010
- Language: French
- ISBN: 9782356482129

Robert Parker: Les Sept Péchés capiteux, translated as Robert Parker: The Seven Heady Sins, written by Benoist Simmat and drawn by Philippe Bercovici, is a French satirical comics album published in October 2010. A slogan on the book's cover reads, "L'Anti-Guide Parker", the antithesis to Le guide Parker, the French term for Parker's Wine Buyer's Guide.

== Story ==
The central character is based on the influential American wine critic Robert Parker whose personal tastes and "Parker point system" is frequently blamed for the effect of "Parkerization", or homogenisation of wine across the world, in particular due to his influence on the Bordeaux wine market as his recommendation or disapproval of wine may result in significant financial consequence with a Parker top score valued by some at potentially £5 million. The story describes his ascent to preeminent wine personality, along with the oenologist Michel Rolland who is often described to travel the world making wines in the style that pleases Parker. Also portrayed are Bordeaux winemakers Jean-Luc Thunevin and Alain Raynaud and American wine merchant Jeffrey Davies.

In the plot, Parker, termed "the oracle of Maryland" arrives in Saint-Émilion in the year 2017 on his 70th birthday, is blindfolded and taken to a cellar where he stands trial before seven men in hooded purple capes for having committed seven heady sins. Parker is given three wines to blind taste which he judges to be "old marmalades". These are revealed to be a 2000 Pavie, a 2005 Valandraud and a 1995 Le Pin, wines Parker has assigned top marks.

== Background ==
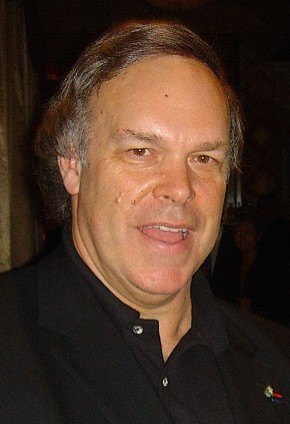
Robert M. Parker, Jr. is the object of satire in this bande dessinée.

Des péchés capitaux is French for deadly sins, while capiteux means heady. The foreword is written by Denis Saverot, editor of the French wine publication La Revue du vin de France.

Benoist Simmat, a journalist of Le Journal du Dimanche, has previously written the book In Vino Satanas in collaboration with Denis Saverot, describing a French wine industry that was in crisis at the time. Simmat has never met Parker, though did apply for an interview two years prior to publication, but a meeting was found impossible.

The likeness of Robert Parker as drawn by Philippe Bercovici has been described as a mixture of Obélix and Gérard Depardieu.

In an email comment to Decanter on his reaction to the BD satire, Parker wrote, "I loved it...absolutely hilarious...and to be a member of TOON TOWN a great honour....hope it is a great success and gets translated into English and other languages...."

Jean-Luc Thunevin, owner and winemaker of Valandraud considered the pioneer "garagiste" who is also featured in the volume, wrote that he "liked it". He describes the story's themes as reminiscent of those in Jonathan Nossiter's 2004 documentary film Mondovino, as well as Elin McCoy's unauthorised Parker biography The Emperor of Wine. He characterises the accusations of standardisation of wine and palate as "fantasies".

Wine merchant Jeffrey Davies expressed to Decanter that he was "disappointed" with the BD for reasons other than that his name was misspelled, stating, "It is not funny, and it's full of inaccuracies and errors", and comparing it to the 2007 book Robert Parker: Anatomie d'un Mythe by Hanna Agostini which he contends was written "out of spite and vengeance".
