= Château Monbousquet =

French wine

Coordinates: 44.87116°N 0.17571°W

- Location: Saint-Sulpice-de-Faleyrens, Gironde, France
- Wine region: Bordeaux (Right Bank)
- Appellation: Saint-Émilion
- Other labels: Château Monbousquet Bordeaux Blanc
- Founded: 16th century
- First vines planted: 19th century
- Key people: Gérard Perse (Owner), Michel Rolland (Consultant)
- Area cultivated: 33 hectares (32 red, 1 white)
- Cases/yr: 8,300 (Red), 450 (White)
- Varietals: Merlot (60%), Cabernet Franc (30%), Cabernet Sauvignon (10%), Sauvignon blanc (White), Sauvignon gris (White), Sémillon (White), Muscadelle (White)

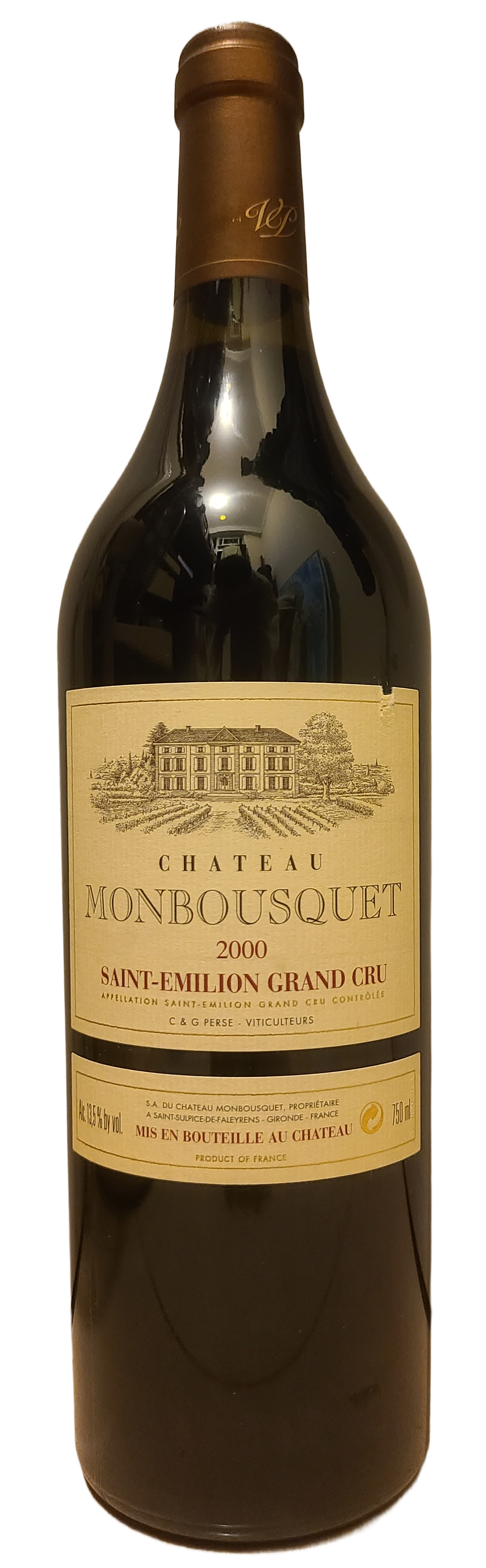
Grand Vin 2000

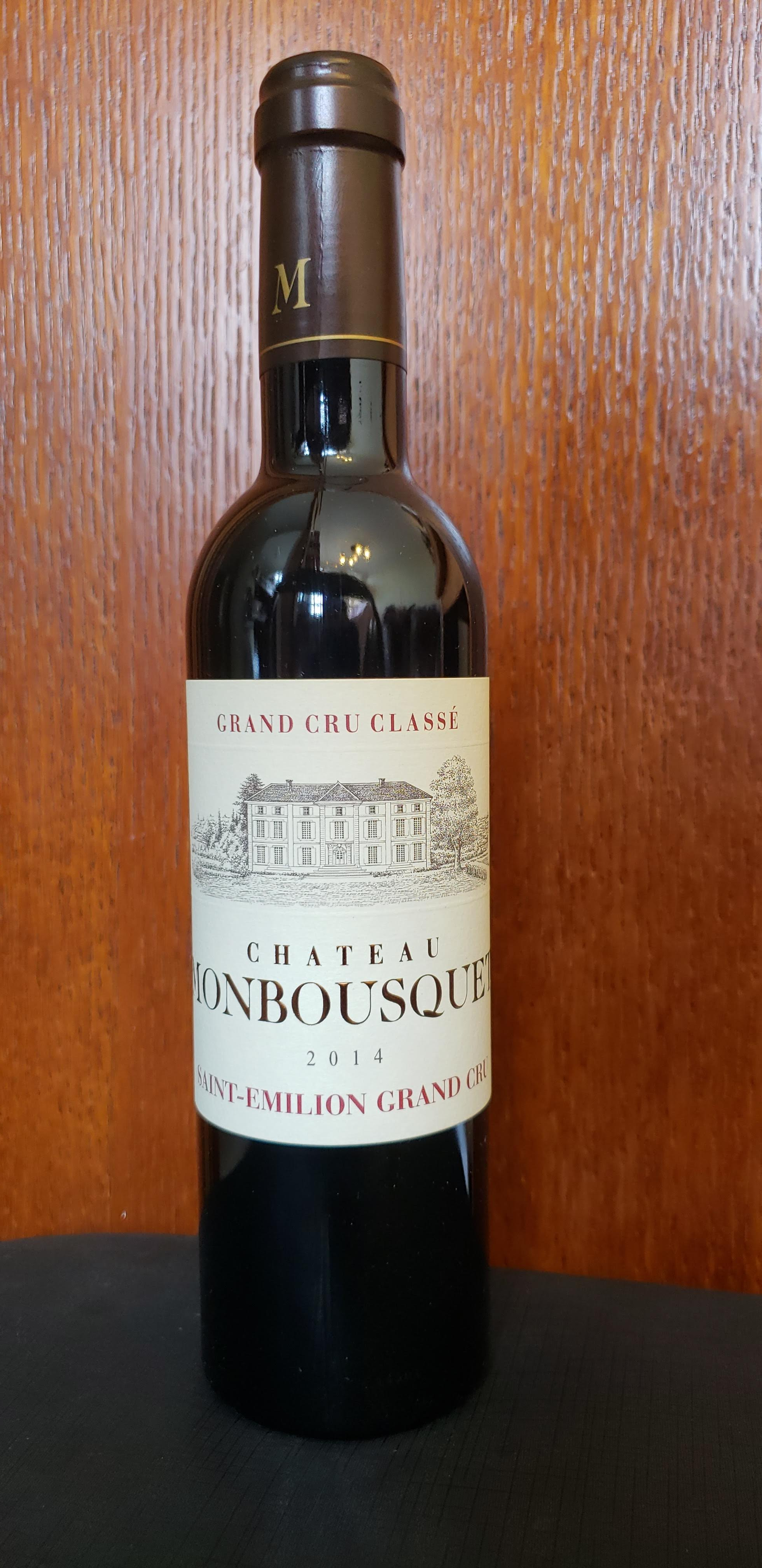
half-bottle of 2014 grand vin

Château Monbousquet is a Bordeaux wine which has the appellation Saint-Émilion, ranked Grand cru classé in the Classification of Saint-Émilion wine. The winery is located in the Right Bank of France’s Bordeaux wine region in the commune of Saint-Sulpice-de-Faleyrens, in the department Gironde.

== History ==
The estate and château originates from the late 16th century, and in the early 18th century the property came to the de Carle family, seigneurs of Château Figeac, while winemaking began at Château Monbousquet in the 19th century when Comte de Vassal-Montviel expanded the estate to 40 hectares and had vines planted on a large scale.

A neglected property by 1945, it was bought by Daniel Querre who began thorough restorations of the vineyards and buildings, continued by his son Alain Querre. In the following years Monbousquet became one of the best-known non-classified wines of Saint-Émilion.

In 1993 Monbousquet was acquired by the Parisian supermarket owner Gérard Perse, who later bought Château Pavie, Château Pavie-Decesse and Château La Clusière. Consultancy was provided by the oenologist Michel Rolland.

The estate was elevated to Grand cru classé in the Saint-Émilion classification of 2006.

== Production ==
The vineyard area extends 32 hectares with the grape varieties of approximately 60% Merlot, 30% Cabernet Franc and 10% Cabernet Sauvignon. Of the Grand vin Monbousquet there is a typically an annual production of 8,300 cases.

The estate also produces a dry white wine, Château Monbousquet Bordeaux Blanc, from a vineyard area of 1 hectare consisting of 55% Sauvignon blanc, 35% Sauvignon gris, 5% Muscadelle and 5% Sémillon. The annual production is 450 cases.
