= Jeffrey Davies =

Jeffrey Davies may refer to:

- Jeffrey Davies (guitarist) (born 1967), with The Brian Jonestown Massacre
- Jeffrey Davies (wine merchant), American

== See also ==
- Jeff Davis (disambiguation)
- Geoff Davis (disambiguation)
- Geoff Davies (disambiguation)
