= Denis Saverot =

Denis Saverot is a French author and the editor of the French wine publication La Revue du vin de France.

In 2008 Saverot accused the French government of contempt for French culture, after a Paris court ruled that a Le Parisien article on Champagne was considered advertising subject to the Evin law, regulating alcohol and tobacco advertising.

Saverot co-authored the 2008 book In Vino Satanas with the Le Journal du Dimanche journalist Benoist Simmat, describing a French wine industry that is currently in a crisis and accusing the French government of subverting the French wine industry in favour of the pharmaceutical industry.

Saverot has also written the foreword to the bande dessinée comic book written by Simmat and illustrated by Philippe Bercovici, satirising the American wine critic Robert M. Parker, Jr., titled Robert Parker: Les Sept Pêchés capiteux.
