= Pierre Papillaud =

French businessman

- Born: Pierre Bernard Papillaud; 1 July 1935; Vignonet, Gironde, Nouvelle-Aquitaine, France
- Died: 13 June 2017 (aged 81); Alençon, France
- Occupation: Businessman

Pierre Bernard Papillaud (1 July 1935 – 13 June 2017) was a French billionaire businessman.

== Early life ==
Pierre Papillaud was born in Vignonet, a small village in Gironde. His grandmother owned two cows. During World War II, his father, who served as an officer in the French Army, was caught by the Nazis in Belgium.

== Career ==
Papillaud owned 51% of the Alma Group, which sells mineral water under the brandnames of Cristaline, MontBlanc, Saint-Yorre, Rozana, Chateldon and Vichy Célestins. In 2008, he sold the other 49% to the Japan-based Otsuka Pharmaceutical for US$1.2 billion.

According to Forbes, he was worth an estimated US$1.31 billion as of 2016. He was the 67th richest person in France (2016).

In April 2016, Papillaud's name was mentioned in the Panama Papers through a power-of-attorney for Krewitt, a company based in the British Virgin Islands.

In September 2016, the New York Times reported that Pierre Papillaud demanded that the town of Weed, California, give up its only water source so that Papillaud's bottle water company could have more water to sell as Cristaline.

== Personal life ==
Papillaud lived in Paris, France, until his death on 13 June 2017.
