= Château Marojallia =

Bordeaux winery company

Coordinates: 45.03981°N 0.67465°W

Château Marojallia is a Bordeaux winery belonging to the appellation Margaux, in the commune of Arsac. A "microcuvée", the wine produced has been described as Médoc's first "garage wine".

The estate also produces a second wine, Clos Margalaine.

== History ==
Located between châteaux Le Tertre and Monbrison, Marojallia was founded in 1999 when the plots of Roger Rex were sold to Philippe Porcheron, and developed by Muriel Thunevin, wife and partner of Jean-Luc Thunevin, the team behind Saint-Émilion's Château Valandraud. With Muriel Thunevin responsible for the 1999 and 2000 vintages, Porcheron has made the wine since 2001. Michel Rolland is retained as consultant oenologist.

The unorthodox and "garagiste" methods were met initially with opposition by neighbouring estates in the appellation, which was commented upon by Robert Parker in The Wine Advocate.

Proving successful, the wine has attained prices above that of Margaux premier cru Château Margaux itself. With the acquisition of a château, Marojallia has grown to incorporate a hotel with restaurant and conference facilities, arranging activities such as wine courses and golf tourism.

== Production ==
The vineyard area extends 4 hectares (9.9 acres), with the grape varieties of 60% Cabernet Sauvignon and 40% Merlot.

Composed of 76% Cabernet Sauvignon and 24% Merlot, of the Grand vin Marojallia there is produced approximately 500 cases per year. With a composition of 64% Cabernet Sauvignon and 36% Merlot, the second wine Clos Margalaine has a typical production of 1,000 cases.
