= Maltus =

Maltus may refer to:

People:

- Jonathan Maltus, winemaker of Château Teyssier, The Colonial Estate and their labels
- Thomas Robert Malthus, a British scholar

In fiction:

- Maltus (comics), a planet in the fictional universe of DC Comics
