= Château de Lussac (Lussac Saint-Emilion) =

Vineyard in Nouvelle-Aquitaine, France

Coordinates: 44°57′3″N 0°5′41″W

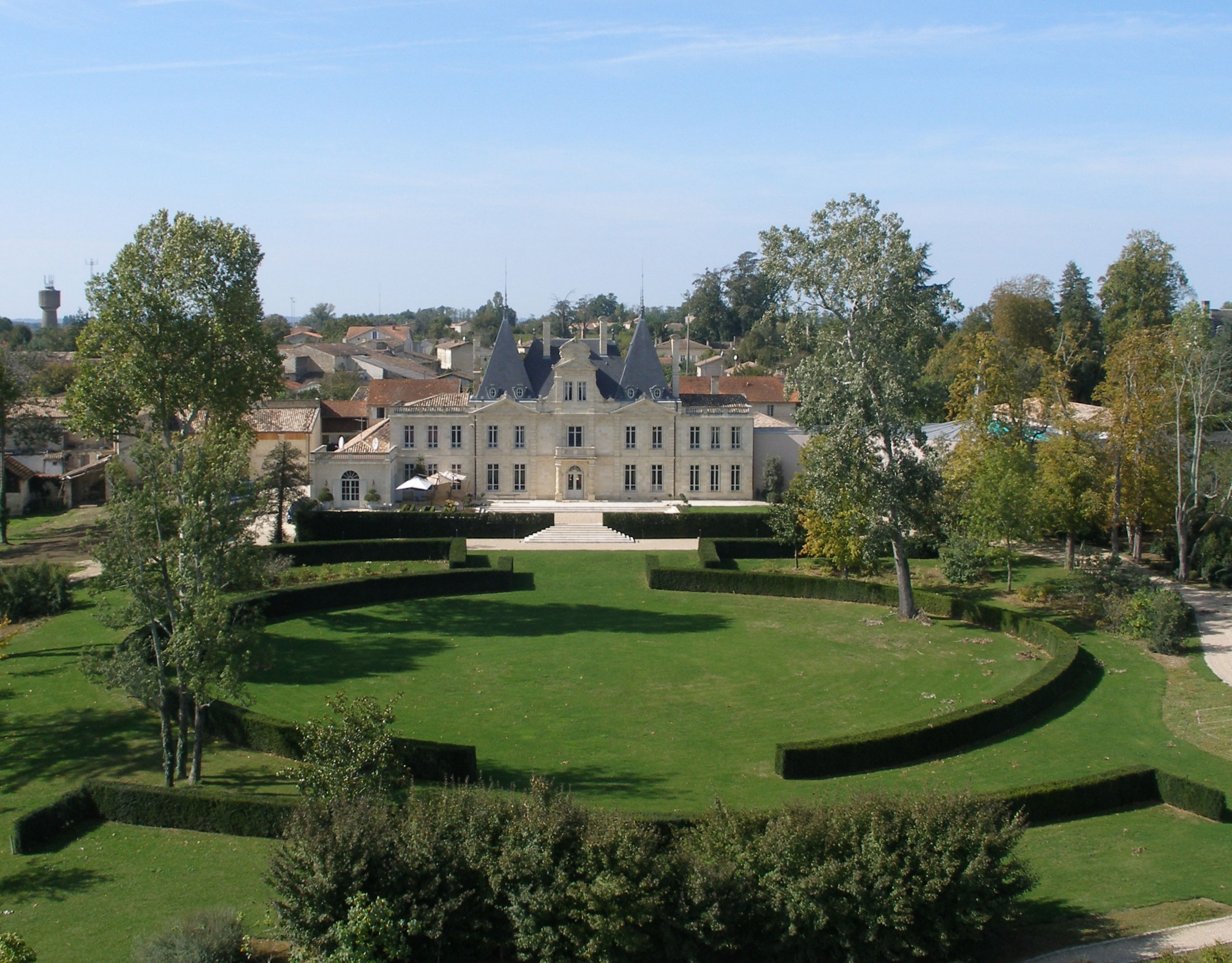
Château de Lussac

Château de Lussac (Lussac-Saint Emilion) is a 30-hectare vineyard located in the village of Lussac, Gironde, in the Lussac-Saint-Emilion Bordeaux's wine appellation. This appellation is one of the so-called satellite appellations of Saint-Émilion.

In the heart of the village, Château de Lussac is easily visible by its distinctive architecture. The main building was built in 1876 by Gascon Montouroy. This vintner and vine grower transmitted the property to his son-in-law, Marquis de Sercey. The property remained in this family until the 1980s when Olivier Roussel repurchased it and produced wines for about 15 years.

In 2000, Griet and Hervé Laviale took over the property. They are also the owners of Château Franc Mayne.

The 30 hectares (74 acres) old vines average 30 years old, planted on the limestone plateau, naturally well drained and exposed. These are 77% Merlot and 23% Cabernet Franc.

== The wines ==
First wine: Château de Lussac

Second wine: Le Libertin de Lussac

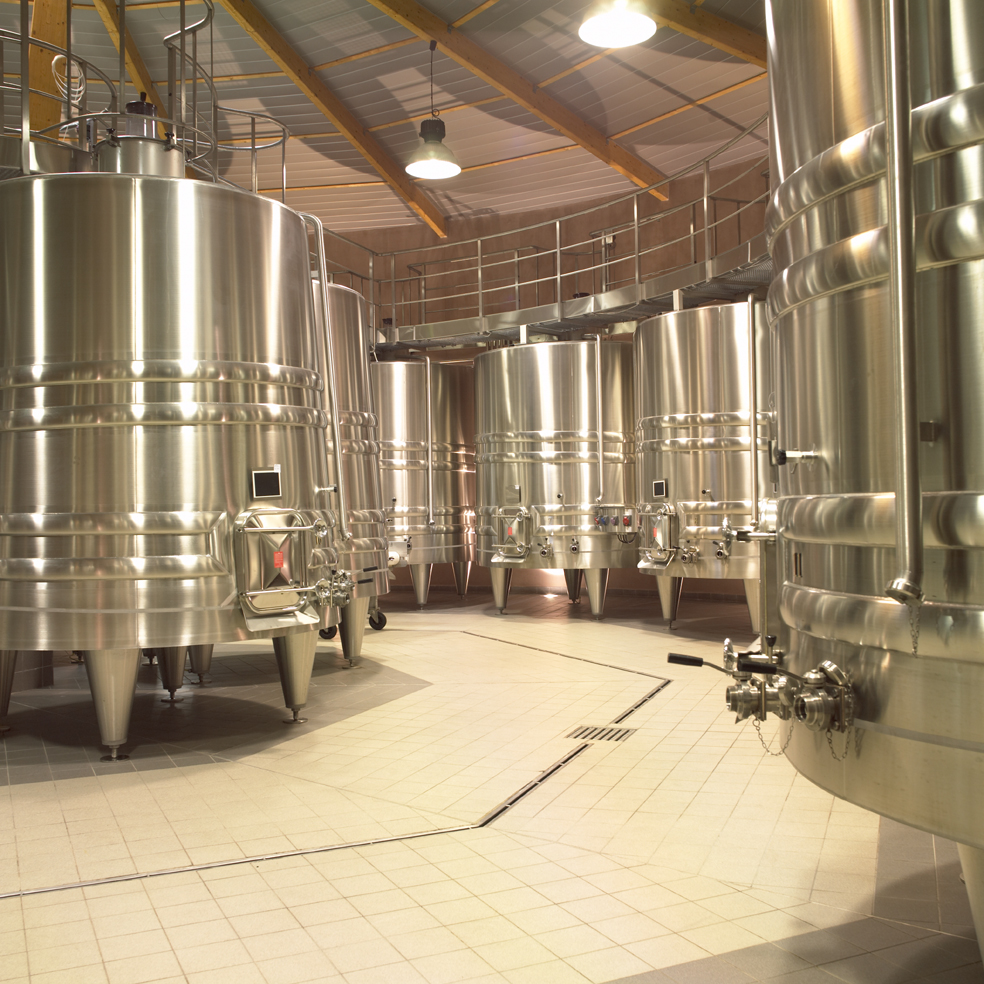
Circle vat room

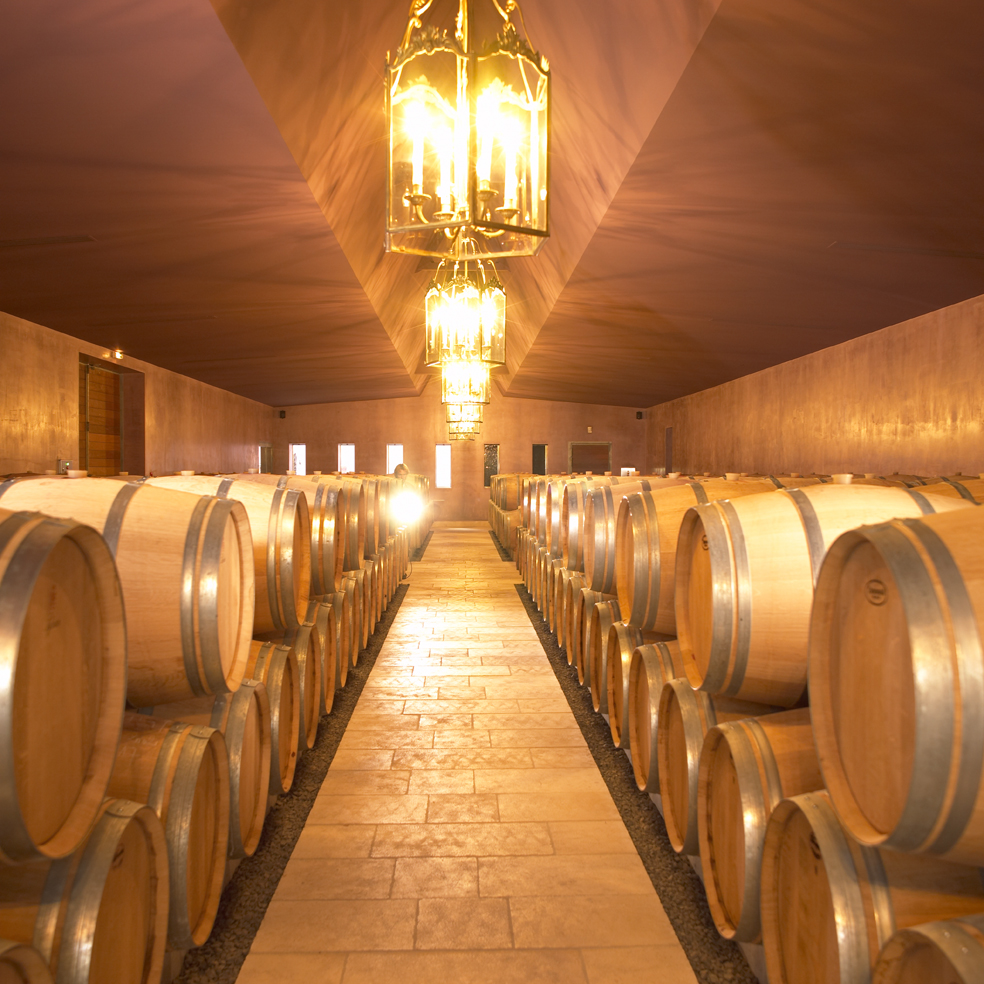
Cellar
