= Benoist Simmat =

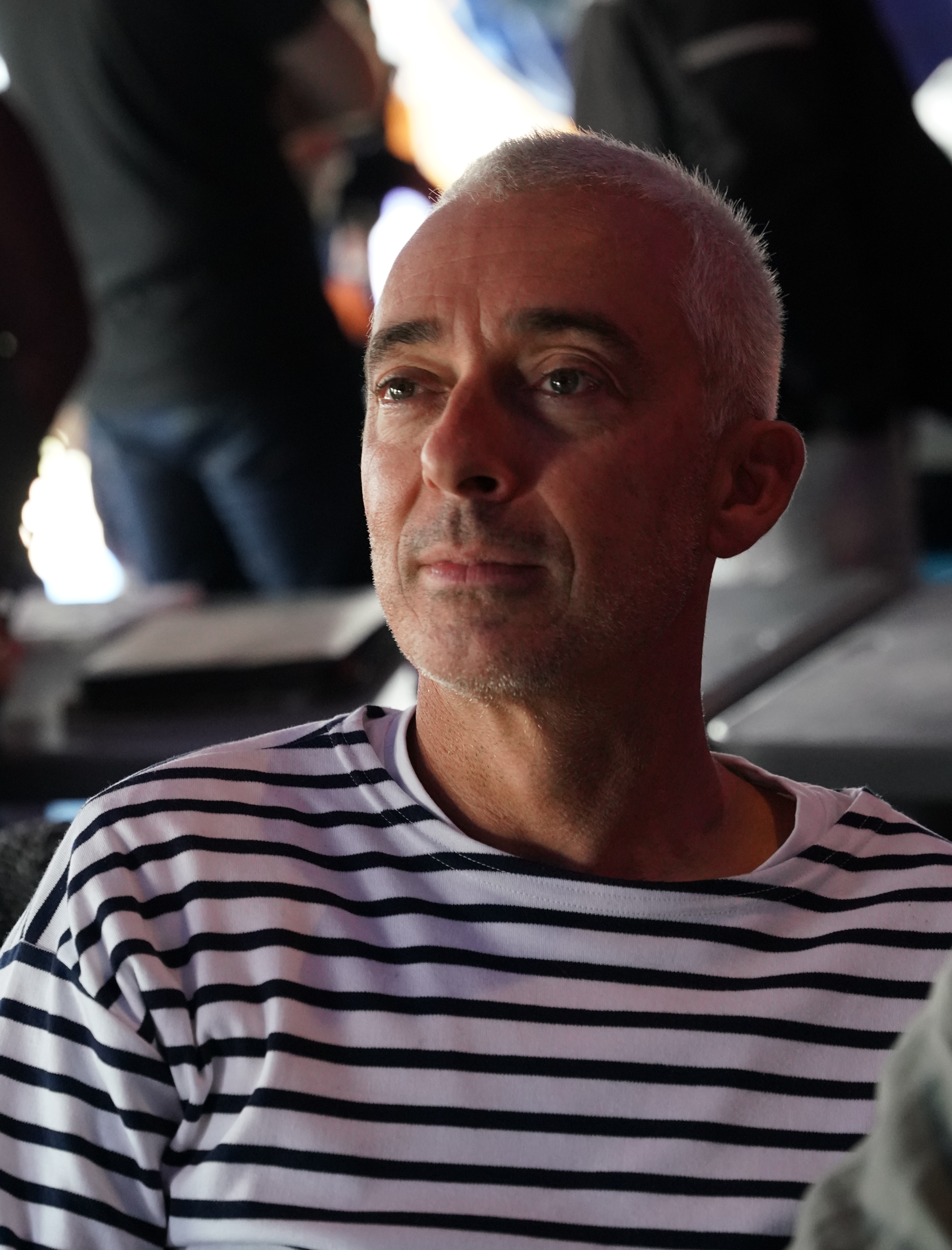
Benoist Simmat

Benoist Simmat is a French author and a journalist with Le Journal du Dimanche.

Simmat has co-authored the 2008 book In Vino Satanas with the editor of La Revue du vin de France, Denis Saverot, describing a French wine industry that is currently in a crisis and accusing the French government of subverting the French wine industry in favour of the pharmaceutical industry.

In 2010 he wrote a bande dessinée comic book illustrated by Philippe Bercovici, satirising the American wine critic Robert M. Parker, Jr., titled Robert Parker: Les Sept Pêchés capiteux.
