= Puisseguin road crash =

2015 Public transit accident in France

Coordinates: 44.914272°N 0.070203°W

2015 Puisseguin road crash

Details
- Date: 23 October 2015; 07:30 local time (05:30 UTC)
- Location: Puisseguin
- Country: France

Statistics
- Deaths: 43
- Injured: 8

The 2015 Puisseguin road crash occurred on 23 October 2015, at 07:30 local time (05:30 UTC). 43 people, including a three-year-old boy, died when a bus and a lorry collided in Puisseguin, a commune in south-western France.

== Crash ==
The crash happened at around 07:30 on the morning of Friday, 23 October 2015 at a bend on Departmental Road 17 not far south of Puisseguin. Authorities said they believed the lorry, carrying logs, lost control on a bend and jackknifed into the coach's path before both vehicles burst into flames.

The cause of the fire and consequent loss of life was that the truck had a large aluminum gasoline tank carrying fuel for chainsaws and other logging equipment, which ruptured in the crash. Afterwards, gasoline streamed down the hill under the bus, where sparks ignited it, and the fire traveled back to the truck.

The bus was equipped with emergency escape hammers with which to break windows, but passengers were not aware of them or not instructed in their use, and several passengers had mobility issues.

== Casualties ==
Forty-one of the dead were on the bus, with the other two being the driver of the lorry and his three-year-old son. Most of the dead on the bus were elderly people who had just set off from the nearby town of Petit-Palais-et-Cornemps, and belonged to that town's seniors' club.

== Rules ==
According to the BEA-TT, the different applicable rules/standards for road vehicles such as autocar, to address fire concerns, are defined at different scales, to let those vehicles work and operate in various countries: United Nations, European Union, and France. Some European directives have been withdrawn.

According to Élisabeth Borne, France submitted the BEA-TT report to United Nations on 11 October 2017.
