= Jeff Davis =

Jeffrey, Geoffrey, Jeff, or Geoff Davis may refer to:

== Politics ==
- Jefferson Davis (1808–1889), President of the Confederate States of America
- Jeff Davis (Arkansas governor) (1862–1913), U.S. Senator and 20th Governor of Arkansas
- Jeffrey O. Davis (born 1961), Wisconsin Court of Appeals judge
- Geoff Davis (born 1958), U.S. Congressman representing Kentucky's 4th district
- Geoff Davis (Australian politician) (born 1931), Tasmanian politician

== Sports ==
- Jeff Davis (American football) (born 1960), professional NFL football player
- Jeff Davis (gymnast) (born 1954), British Olympic gymnast
- Jeff Davis (racing driver) (born 1959), American racing driver
- Jeff Davis (ski jumper) (born 1958), American ski jumper

== Others ==
- Jeff Davis (horse) (fl. 1860s–1870s), owned by Ulysses S. Grant
- Jeff B. Davis (born 1973), American actor, comedian and singer
- Jeff Davis (writer) (born 1975), American television writer and producer
- Geoffrey Davis (doctor) (died 2008), Australian doctor

== Places ==
- Jeff Davis County, Georgia
- Jeff Davis County, Texas

== See also ==
- Geoff Davies (disambiguation)
- Geoff Davis (disambiguation)
- Jeffrey Davies (disambiguation)
- Jefferson Davis (disambiguation)
