= Geoff Davis (disambiguation) =

Geoff Davis (born October 26, 1958) is a former U.S. representative for Kentucky.

Geoff or Geoffrey Davis may also refer to:

- Geoff Davis (Australian politician) (born 1931), Australian politician
- Geoffrey Davis (doctor) (died 2008), Australian doctor and director of the International Abortion Research and Training Centre
- Geoff Davis (director), producer of William Kelly's War
- Geoff Davis (high jumper) (born 1990), American high jumper, 3rd at the 2013 outdoor NCAA championships for the Purdue Boilermakers track and field team

== See also ==
- Geoff Davies (disambiguation)
- Jeffrey Davies (disambiguation)
- Jeff Davis (disambiguation)
- Geoffrey Hart-Davis (1905–1941), South African cricketer and soldier
