= Jefferson Davis (disambiguation) =

Jefferson Davis (1808–1889), President of the Confederate States from 1861 to 1865.

Jefferson Davis also refer to:

== People ==
- Jefferson C. Davis (1828–1879), American Civil War Union general, military commander in territorial Alaska, murderer of Gen. William "Bull" Nelson
- Jefferson "Jeff" Davis, U.S. Senator for Arkansas from 1907 to 1913
- Jefferson Davis "Jeff" Hughes, III (born 1952), Republican member of the Louisiana Supreme Court
- Carl Panzram, a serial killer who used the alias Jefferson Davis

== Places ==
- Jefferson Davis County, Mississippi
- Jefferson Davis Parish, Louisiana

== Other uses ==
- Jefferson Davis (character), a fictional character in Marvel Comics and the father of Miles Morales / Spider-Man
- Jefferson Davis (revenue cutter), which was in use in 1853–1862.
- Jefferson Davis (privateer), a ship allied with the Confederate States Navy
- Jefferson Davis Community College, a college in Brewton, Alabama
- Jefferson Davis Highway, a planned US transcontinental highway in the 1920s
- Jefferson Davis Hospital, in Houston, Texas
- Jefferson Davis Hotel, in Montgomery, Alabama
- Jefferson Davis Presidential Library and Museum, in Biloxi, Mississippi
- Jefferson Davis State Historic Site, a monument at Davis's birthplace in northern Kentucky
- Jefferson Davis Memorial Historic Site, in Irwin County, Georgia, marks the location where he was captured in 1865
- Johnson Abernathy Graetz High School, formerly named Jefferson Davis High School
- List of memorials to Jefferson Davis, several statues and other memorials to the Confederate president
- Northside High School (Houston), formerly named Jefferson Davis High School

== See also ==
- Boss Hogg or Jefferson Davis Hogg, a character in The Dukes of Hazzard
- Jeff Davis (disambiguation)
