= René Labusquiere =

French doctor

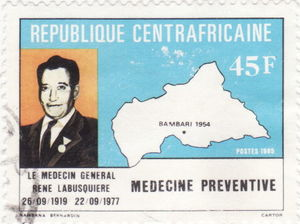
- Labusquiere featured on a 1985 Central African stamp
- Born: 26 September 1919; Saint-Laurent-des-Combes, Gironde
- Died: 22 September 1977 (aged 57); Paris, France
- Education: Bordeaux Segalen University
- Years active: 1946-1977
- Known for: Pioneer of preventative medicine in Africa
- Medical career
- Profession: Doctor
- Institutions: Senegal: Department of Mobile General Hygiene and Prophylaxis; Upper Volta: Department of Endemic Diseases; Upper Volta: Department of Rural Medicine and Endemic Diseases; International: Organization of Coordination for the Fight against Endemic Diseases in Central Africa
- Sub-specialties: Preventative medicine
- Research: Tropical diseases

René Labusquiere (26 September 1919 – 22 September 1977) was a French doctor who pioneered and led the implementation of preventive medicine to combat tropical diseases in Central and West Africa. He was the first Secretary-General of the Organization for Cooperation in the Fight against Major Endemic Diseases in Central Africa (l'OCEAC) and an officer of the Troupes de marine.

== Career ==
From 1946 to 1954, Labusquiere lived in French Cameroon and Ubangi-Shari. During this time in Africa, he participated in a mobile bush doctor program with a focus on combating tropical diseases. As a result of this experience, Labusquiere became interested in leprosy and enrolled in training programs on leprosy treatment in Guyana and Brazil.

Labusquiere was later appointed head of the Department of Mobile General Hygiene and Prophylaxis in Dakar, Senegal. In this position he travelled throughout Francophone West Africa treating leprosy patients in remote villages. During this time he pioneered innovations relating to both early detection and mass treatment.

Following the decolonisation of French Africa, newly independent countries sought to implement preventive medicine policies. Given the countries' limited resources and the distribution and density of the population, such policies were more effective than treatment. During this time, Labesquiere was appointed as the head of the Department of Endemic Diseases of Upper Volta. Four years later, Labesquiere created and headed a successor department: the Department of Rural Medicine and Endemic Diseases. The new department used methods in line with those of international organisations, including the World Health Organization and United States Agency for International Development. The new department embarked on a major measles vaccination campaign.

In 1964, the Ministers of Health of Cameroon, the Republic of the Congo, Gabon, the Central African Republic and Chad established the Organization of Coordination for the Fight against Endemic Diseases in Central Africa (Organisation de Coordination pour la lutte contre les Endémies en Afrique Centrale (l'OCEAC)). Labusquiere was appointed as the inaugural Secretary-General of this organization. Using international cooperation and funds, the organization advocated for major health campaigns and researched and developed diagnosis and treatment techniques tailored for large populations.

In 1970, Labusquiere published the book Santé Rurale et Médecine Préventive en Afrique Noire (Rural Health and Preventive Medicine in Black Africa), among other works.

In 1974, Labusquiere was involved in disproving the effectiveness of the colonial preventative medical practice of 'lomidinisation', which he himself had participated in. After publicly denouncing the injections as "useless, dangerous, and therefore uselessly dangerous," official histories of colonial medicine generally omitted this failed 1950s program.
