= Petit-Palais-et-Cornemps =

- Commune
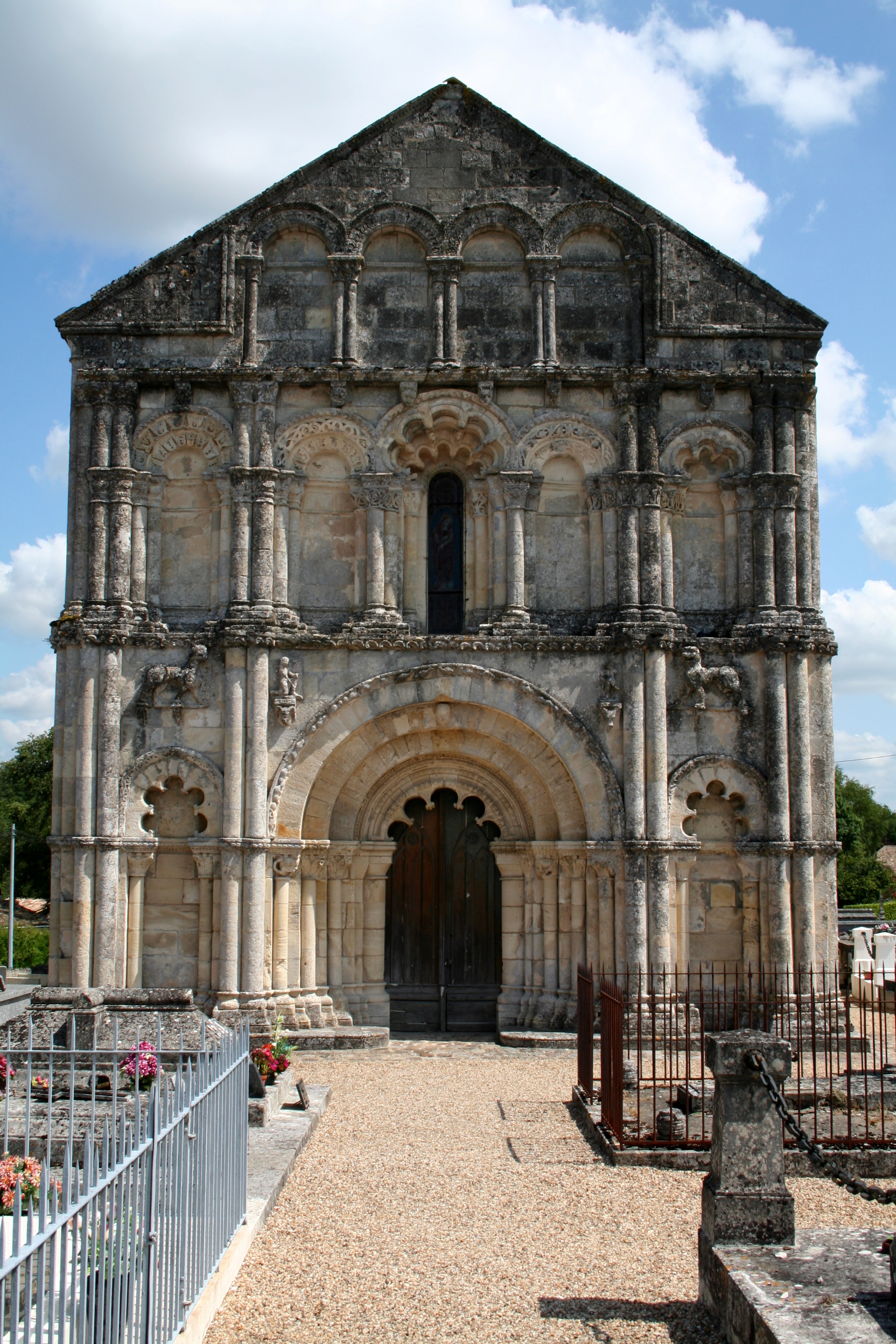
- The church of Saint-Pierre of Petit-Palais-et-Cornemps, 13th century
- Location of Petit-Palais-et-Cornemps
- Location within France Location within Nouvelle-Aquitaine
- Coordinates: 44°58′56″N 0°03′43″W
- Country: France
- Region: Nouvelle-Aquitaine
- Department: Gironde
- Arrondissement: Libourne
- Canton: Le Nord-Libournais

Government
  - Mayor (2020–2026): Patricia Raichini
- Area^{1}: 14.32 km^{2} (5.53 sq mi)
- Elevation: 293 m (961 ft)
- Highest elevation: 85 m (279 ft)
- Lowest elevation: 16 m (52 ft)
- Population (2023): 740
  - Density: 52/km^{2} (130/sq mi)
- Time zone: UTC+01:00 (CET)
  - Summer (DST): UTC+02:00 (CEST)
- INSEE/Postal code: 33320 /33570
- ^{1} French Land Register data, which excludes lakes, ponds, glaciers > 1 km^{2} (0.386 sq mi or 247 acres) and river estuaries.

Petit-Palais-et-Cornemps (Occitan: Pichon Palat e Cornemps) is a commune in the Gironde department in Nouvelle-Aquitaine in southwestern France.

== Population ==
Historical population
Year	Pop.	±% p.a.
1968	530	—
1975	503	−0.74%
1982	489	−0.40%
1990	565	+1.82%
1999	551	−0.28%
2007	636	+1.81%
2012	756	+3.52%
2017	723	−0.89%
2023	740	+0.39%
Source: INSEE

== Puisseguin road crash ==
Most of the forty-three dead of the Puisseguin road crash the 23 October 2015, passengers of a bus which hit a lorry, belonged to the Petit-Palais seniors' club. This accident was the deadliest road accident in France since 1982.

== See also ==
- Communes of the Gironde department
