= Garagistes =

Group of winemakers

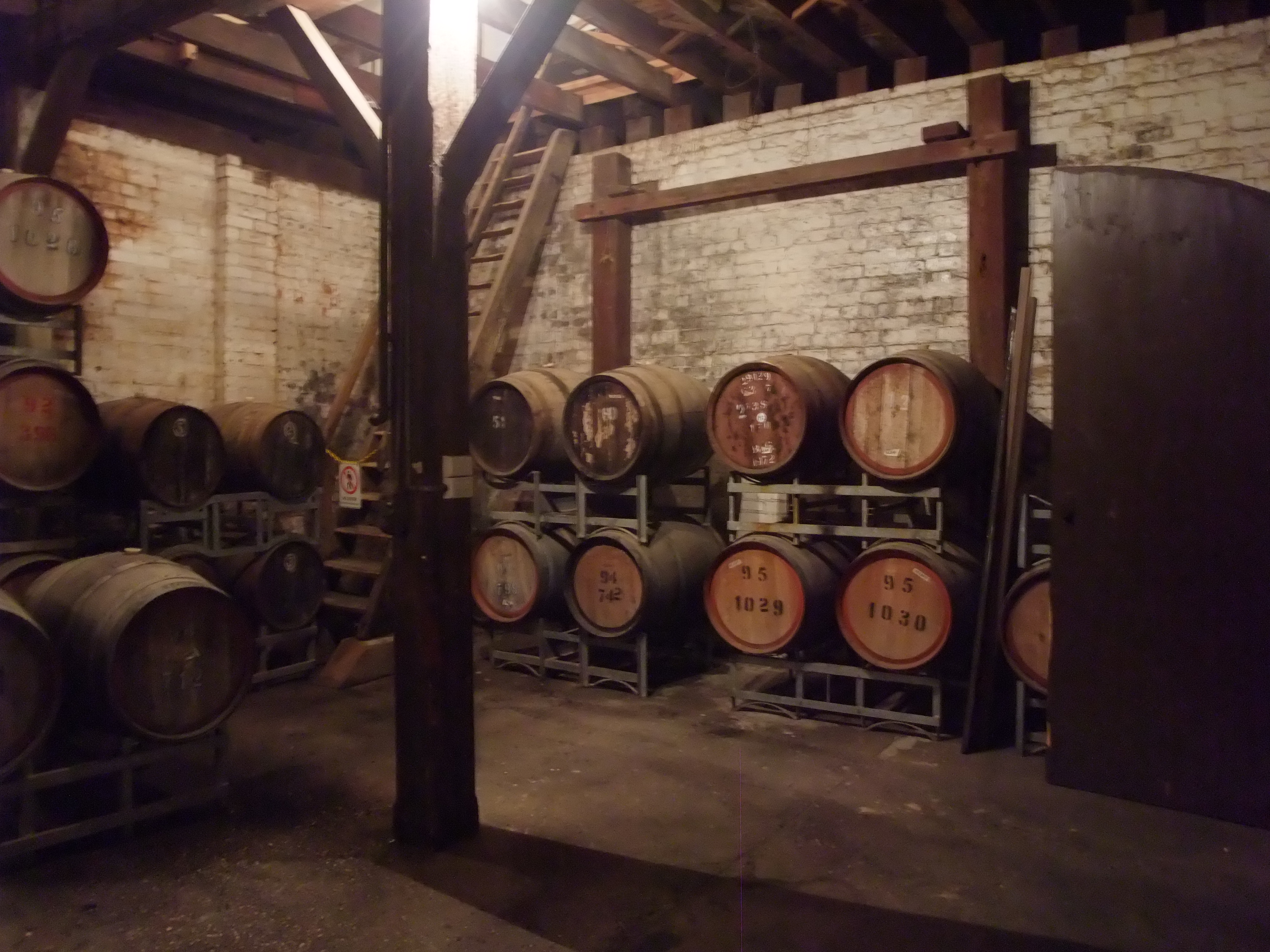
Most "garage wineries" produce small lots of limited production wines.

The garagistes refers to a group of winemakers in the Bordeaux region, producing vins de garage, "garage wine". A group emerged in the mid-1990s in reaction to the traditional style of red Bordeaux wine, which is highly tannic and requires long ageing in the bottle to become drinkable. The garagistes developed a style more consistent with perceived international wine tastes.

For red wines this means "bigger, bolder, fruitier wines, often with sometimes a higher alcohol content." The new style for white wines is a more pronounced oak taste with some residual sugar. This new style of wine is controversial, and purists claim that the wines will not age well and they don't reflect well the terroir of the region, nor the typicity of the grape varieties used. Characterised as "winemaker's wine whose attributes reflect a disregard for the traditional handling of its particular terroir", the term is sometimes used somewhat as a backhanded compliment; in light of this, vins de garage wines come from previously unknown estates without proven track record or pedigree. Alternately, such wine is referred to as super-cuvée or microchâteau. The wines produced by these estates often receive very high wine ratings from Robert Parker, and are usually sold at prices driven high by rarity, hyperbole, and fashion.

== History ==
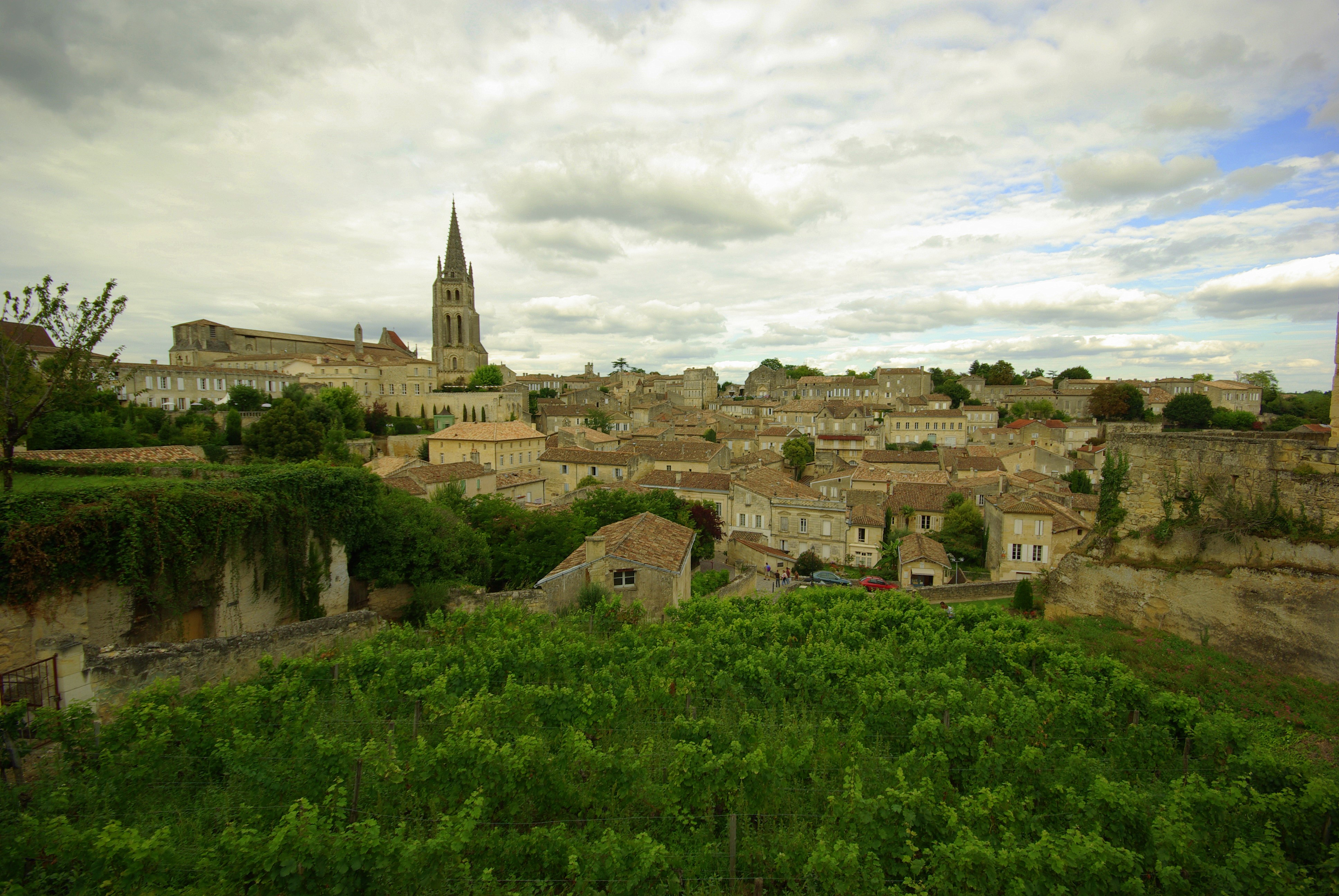
Many notable garagiste wines come from the Bordeaux wine regions of Saint-Émilion (pictured) and Pomerol.

Considered a predecessor of the garage wine, Château Le Pin founded by the Belgians Marcel and Gérard Thienpont on less than two hectares in the late 1970s, wine was produced by microcuvée from a farmhouse basement in Pomerol. Following the efforts of Jean-Luc Thunevin and Murielle Andraud, and the emergence of Château Valandraud came the description of a "movement". Founded in 1989 on a 1 hectare plot in Saint-Émilion, with limited funds for equipment, much work was done primitively by hands and feet in their garage, with high detail labour resulting in low output yields defining the methods of the model.

Several wines fashioned in this same model appeared on the market, such as La Mondotte from Château Canon-la-Gaffelière, La Gomerie from Château Beau-Séjour-Bécot, Le Dôme, Vieux Château Mazerat, Les Astéries and Le Carré from Château Teyssier, Quinault L'Enclos, Rol Valentin, Barde-Haut, Gracia, L'Hermitage and Marojallia. The terms vins du garage and garagistes have been attributed to French writers Nicholas Baby and Michel Bettane.

After Robert Parker rated Valandraud a better 1995 vintage wine than Pétrus, the economic effects were substantial. Developments in the market saw garage wines attain surprisingly high prices, sometimes well beyond historically top-priced products. However, the early 2000s saw indications of a reverse in the trend. Wine writer Jancis Robinson noted that the Garage wine market had "shrivelled considerably in recent years", and Robert Parker stated that while the wines are "here to stay ... only the best will survive." Steven Spurrier commented further, "the belief that ridiculously low yields make better wine has finally been exploded by the quality of [the abundant] 2004, as it should have been by 2000, 1996 and 1990. Goodbye to a fad."

The American garagiste movement received its first exposure in 2011 at the inaugural Garagiste Festival in Paso Robles, California. Paso Robles represents the core of the garagiste movement, according to WinesVinesDATA. It lists some 127 wineries with annual production of 1,000 or fewer cases in Paso's home county, San Luis Obispo (SLO). Every year dozens of artisan winemakers pour at the non-profit festival.

== Criticism ==
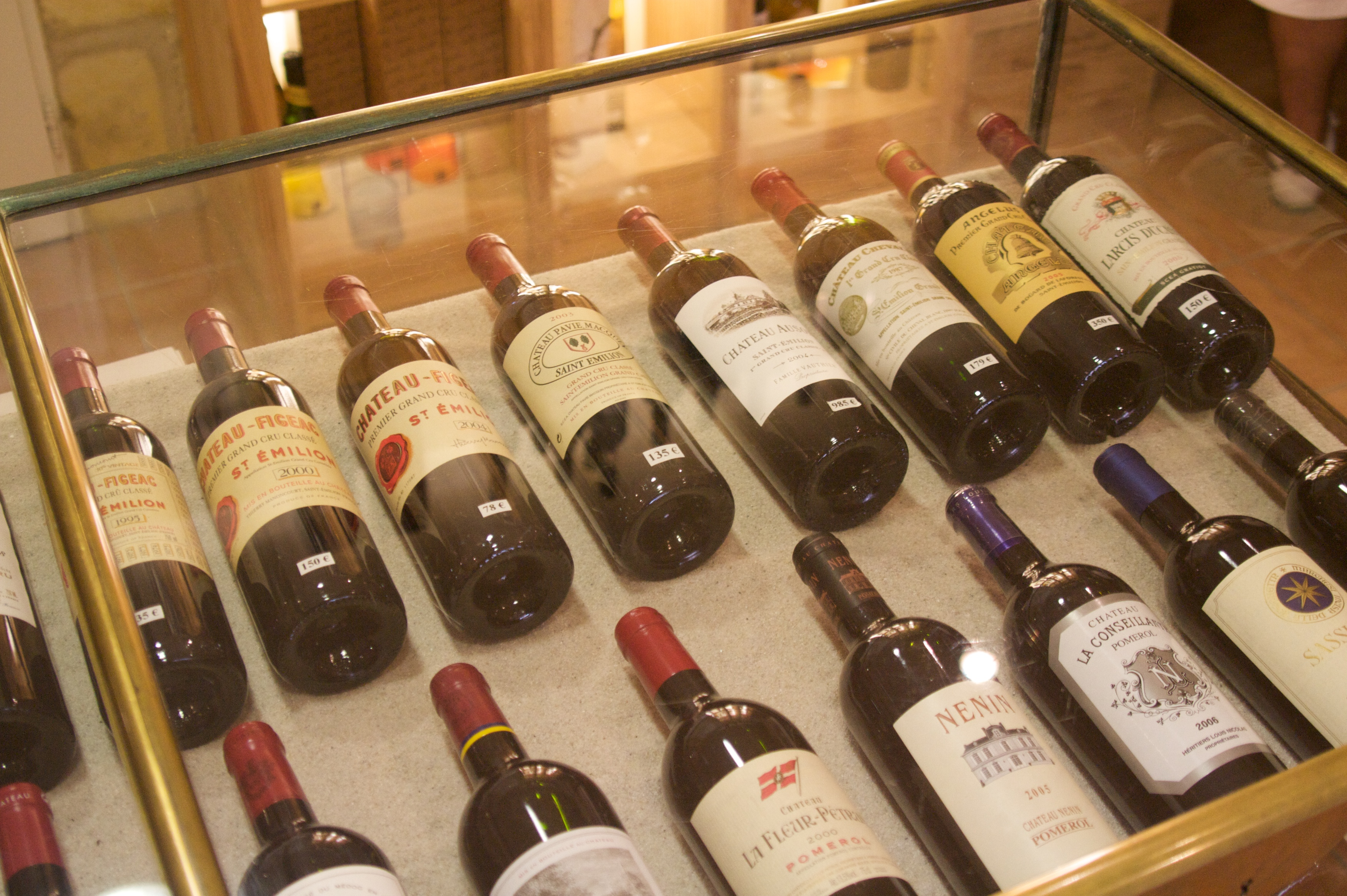
Some of the criticism for vins de garage is that with their high prices and limited production, they appear to be made more for wine collectors rather than for wine drinkers.

Despite the critical acclaim and high prices that have been fetched by some vins de garage, both the term and the movement have faced criticism. In addition to wine experts such as Steven Spurrier describing it a fad, some writers, noted by Graham Harding, have gone so far as to suggest the cult following of these wines are an example of "The Emperor's New Clothes syndrome" and that the wines are made more for collectors than for wine drinkers.

Another critic is Master of Wine Michael Palij, who compares garagistes, particularly those of Château Valandraud, to the large California wine producer E & J Gallo Winery saying "Each is a triumph of style over substance. Neither pays any regard to either history or terroir."

== See also ==
- French wine
- Bordeaux wine
- History of French wine
