= Geoff Davies =

Geoff Davies may refer to:

- Geoff Davies (bishop) (born 1941), bishop of Umzimvubu
- Geoff Davies (footballer) (born 1947), English professional footballer
- Geoff Davies (Australian cricketer) (born 1946), Australian cricketer
- Geoffrey Davies (cricketer) (1892–1915), English cricketer
- Geoffrey Davies (1938–2023), English actor
- Geoff Davies (active from 1981), English founder and owner of the record label Probe Plus

== See also ==
- Jeffrey Davies (disambiguation)
- Geoff Davis (disambiguation)
- Jeff Davis (disambiguation)
