= Château Quinault =

Winery in the Bordeaux region of France

Coordinates: 44.90078°N 0.23845°W

Château Quinault is a winery from the appellation Saint-Émilion within the city of Libourne, producing Quinault L'Enclos, a Bordeaux wine counted among the Bordeaux Right Bank supercuvées or vins de garage. The estate also produces a second wine, Lafleur de Quinault, and a special cuvée called L'Absolut de Quinault.

== History ==
A walled vineyard in the Libourne suburbs, located in what was until 1973 the satellite appellation Sables-Saint-Émilion, the past of Château Quinault is largely unknown but believed to have originated in the 17th century.

In 1930 it was bought by the négociant Baptiste Mons, while the estate lost 8 hectares expropriated for use as a cemetery. Quinault was inherited by his son-in-law Henri Maleret in 1948, who ran the estate until the 90s.

=== Alain Raynaud ===
Upon learning that a German real estate company planned to buy the property and construct a housing development, Dr. Alain Raynaud and Françoise Raynaud acquired Quinault for USD$3.4 million. Dr. Raynaud, a former physician and president of the Union des Grands Crus (1994–2000), is also owner of the Pomerol estates Château La Croix-de-Gay and Château La Fleur-de-Gay and supervises production at Château Lascombes, while he is often exemplified by media as a friend of Robert Parker, and has a reputation as a "Bordeaux maverick".

The Raynauds made substantial investments to the estate while applying some techniques considered unorthodox to the winemaking. Michel Rolland and Denis Dubourdieu are retained as consultant oenologists.

Raynaud was among the wine personalities satirised next to Robert Parker in the 2010 bande dessinée comic book, Robert Parker: Les Sept Pêchés capiteux.

=== Sale ===
In September, 2008, Quinault was sold to Bernard Arnault, head of luxury goods empire LVMH, and his associate Albert Frère, adding to their portfolio of Saint-Émilion properties Château Cheval Blanc and Château la Tour du Pin Figeac. At the time of the sale, Raynaud stated he did not have the means to continue improving the estate, citing the frost in 2002, the heat wave in 2003 and the hail in 2004 as problematic factors, but pledged to remain with Quinault as a consultant.

== Production ==
The vineyard area extends 15.6 hectares (39 acres), and is composed of 65% Merlot, 20% Cabernet Franc, 10% Cabernet Sauvignon and 5% Malbec, with a large portion of the vines planted between 1930 and 1948, and another between 1957 and 1961. Of the Grand vin there is typically a production of 3,000 to 5,000 cases.
