= Saint-Émilion AOC =

French protected geographic wine appellation

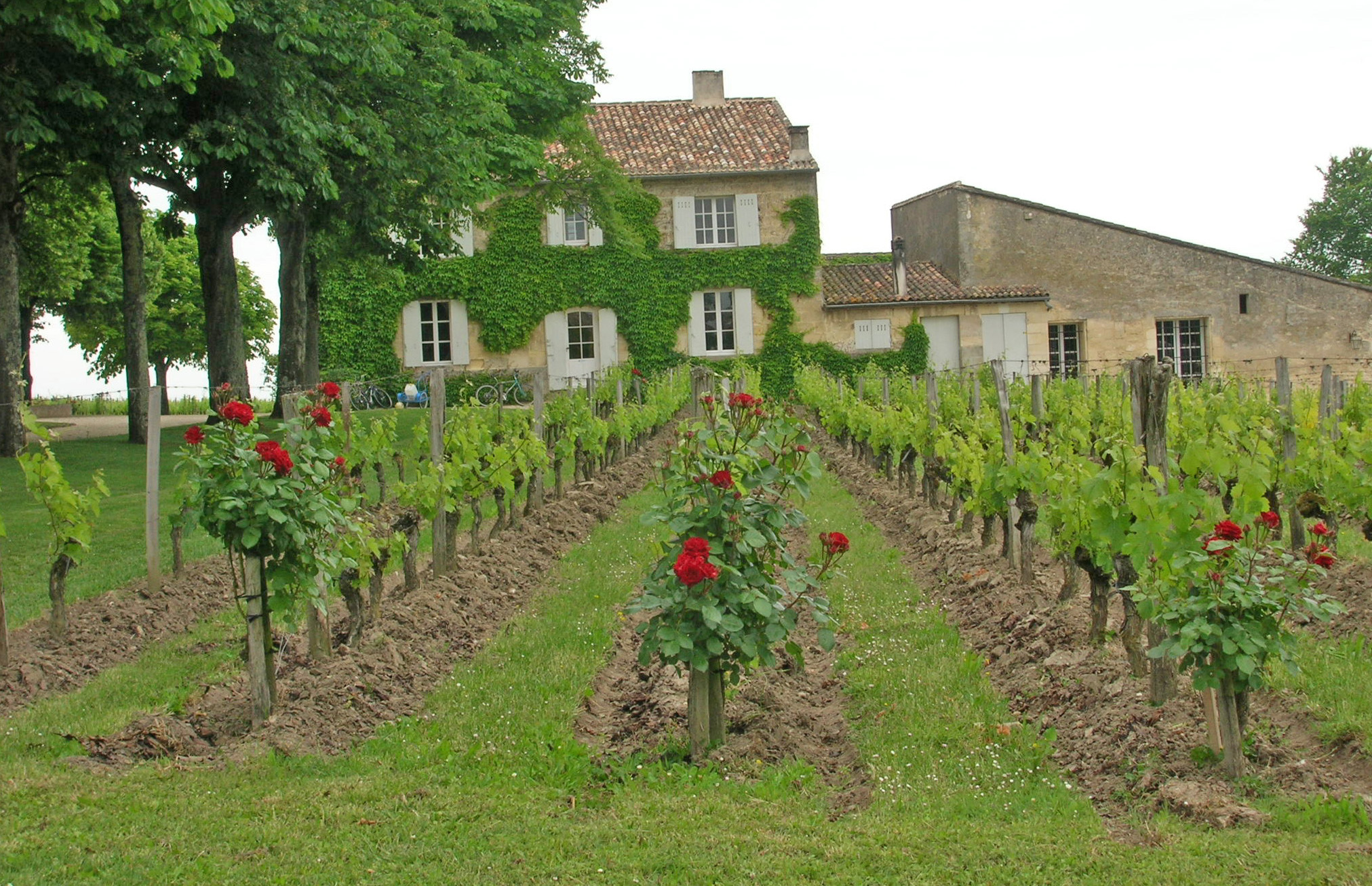
Clos Fourtet vines have roses planted at the end of the rows.

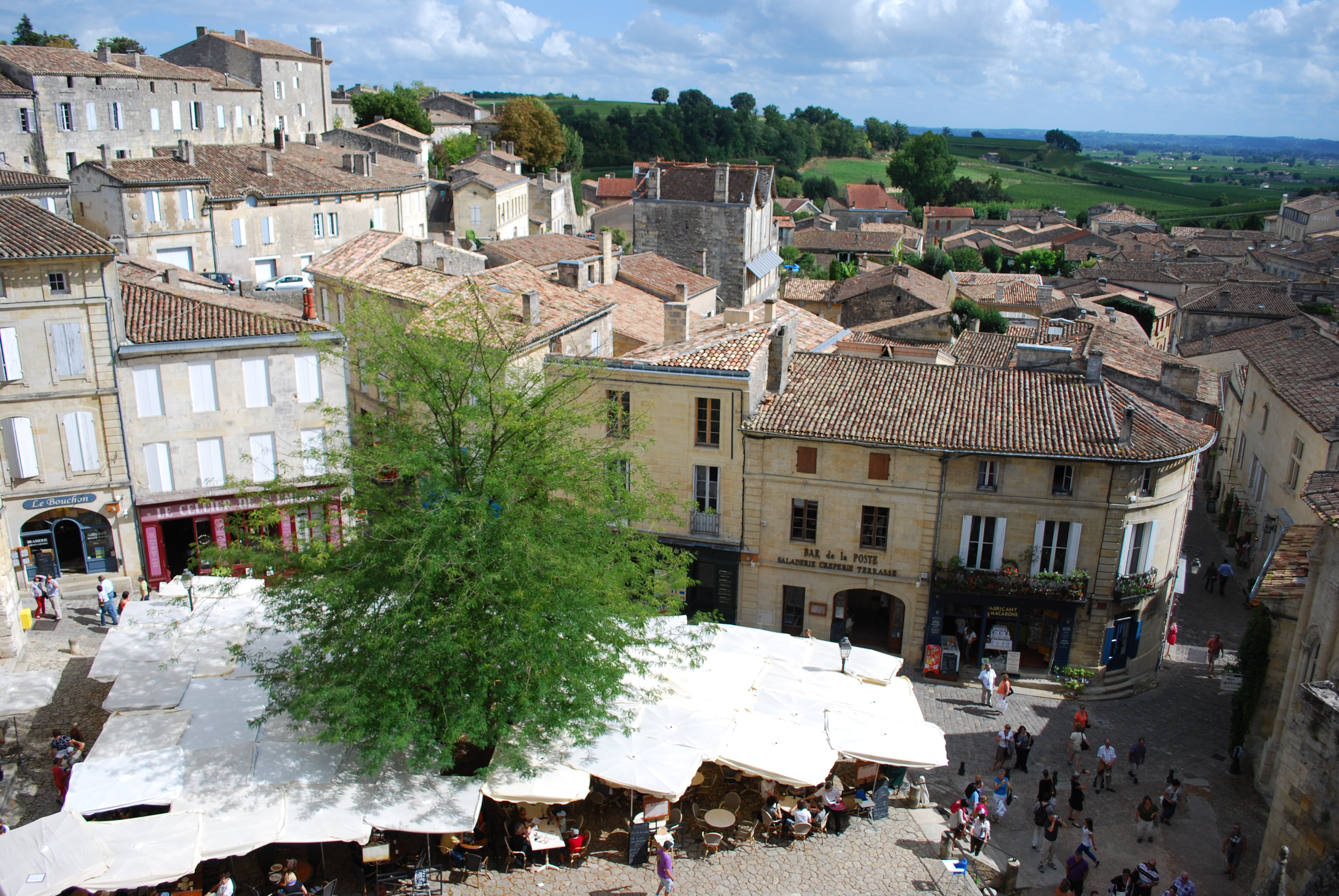
Saint-Émilion

Saint-Émilion (French pronunciation: [sɛ̃t‿emiljɔ̃]; Occitan: Sant-Emilion AOC) is an appellation d'origine contrôlée (AOC) for red wine in the Bordeaux wine region of France, where it is situated in the Libourne subregion on the right bank of the Dordogne. As a cultural landscape demonstrating a long, living history of wine-making (dating from Roman times), Saint-Émilion was registered as a UNESCO World Heritage Site in 1999.

Its 5,400 hectares (13,000 acres) represent 67.5% of the total area of wine-producing communes (Saint-Émilion, Saint-Christophe-des-Bardes, Saint-Hippolyte, Saint-Étienne-de-Lisse, Saint-Laurent-des-Combes, Saint-Pey-d’Armens, Saint-Sulpice-de-Faleyrens, Vignonet, and a part of the Libourne commune) and 6% of the total Bordeaux vineyard.

The wines of Saint-Émilion are typically blended from different grape varieties, the three main ones being Merlot, Cabernet Franc and Cabernet Sauvignon.

== Classification ==
Since 1955, there has been a classification of Saint-Émilion wine. The classification is updated every 10 years or so, and consists of the following levels: Premier grand cru classé A, Premier grand cru classé B, and Grand cru classé. As of the 2022 classification, there are currently two estates at the highest level: Château Figeac and Château Pavie.

== Saint-Émilion satellites ==
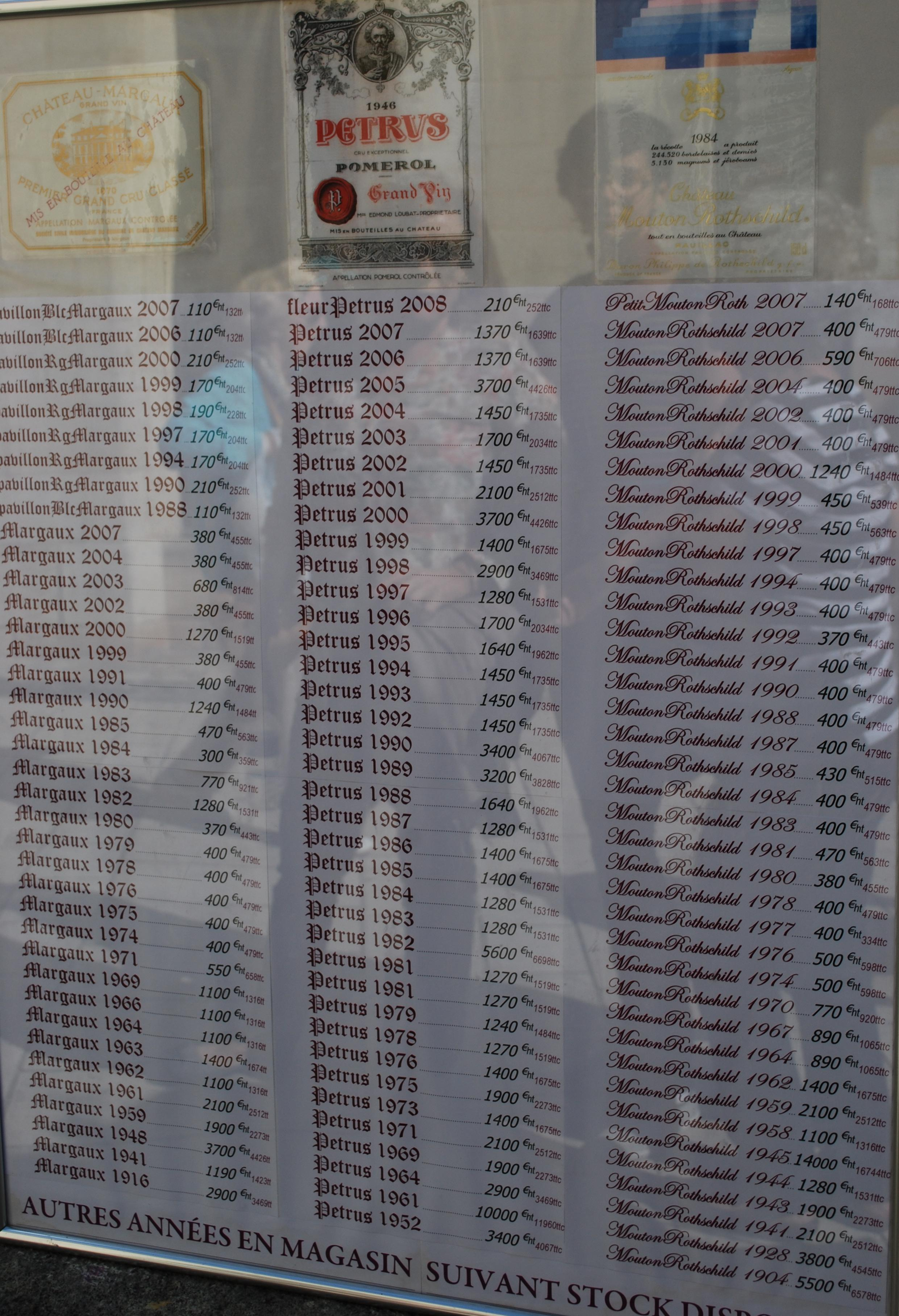
Vintage wine price list, Saint-Émilion

Four other appellations situated immediately north and northeast of the Saint-Émilion AOC, across the Barbanne river, are collectively known as the Saint-Émilion satellites. They are Lussac-Saint-Émilion, Montagne-Saint-Émilion, Puisseguin-Saint-Émilion, and Saint-Georges-Saint-Émilion. There were previous two other appellations: Parsac-Saint-Émilion, which became part of Montagne-Saint-Émilion in the 1970s; and Sables-Saint-Émilion, which became part of Saint-Émilion proper following lobbying by Alain Raynaud of Château Quinault. Of these, Montagne is the largest and Saint-Georges is the smallest. These previously called themselves "Saint-Émilion", but with the development of the AOC system in the 1930s, they were split off as inferior appellations (to not dilute the Saint-Émilion name), but allowed to add Saint-Émilion to the village name.

Pomerol also borders St Émilion to the west but is not considered a satellite and many of its wine compete with or outperform their neighbour, and in fact has its own satellite, Lalande-de-Pomerol, also to the north of the Barbanne.

== See also ==
- Bordeaux wine regions
