= Philippe Bercovici =

French comics artist (born 1963)

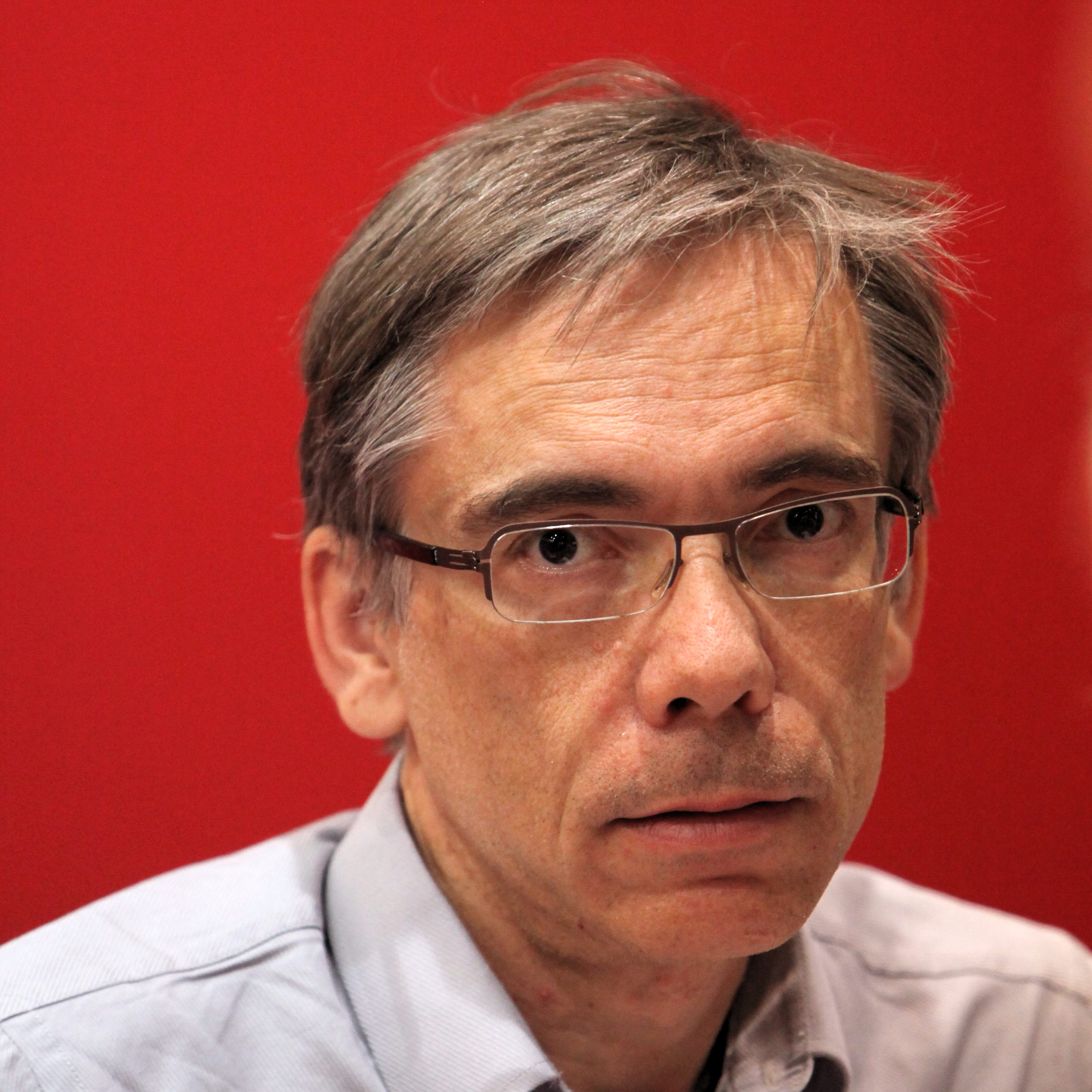
- Philippe Bercovici in 2011
- Born: 5 January 1963 (age 63) Nice, France
- Area: artist
- Pseudonym: Thélonius
- Notable works: Les Femmes en Blanc; Robinson et Zoé; Le Boss

Philippe Bercovici is a French comics artist of Franco-Belgian comics. Having illustrated a wide range of series, Bercovici is perhaps most known for Les Femmes en Blanc written by Cauvin, started in 1981. Initially under the pseudonym Thélonius, he drew the gag series Le Boss written by Zidrou, revolving around the chief editor of Spirou magazine.

Known for working at unusually high speeds, in 1999 Bercovici illustrated an entire issue of Spirou on his own (No. 3183), imitating the styles of the other regular artists, including the continuing stories.

Bercovici has also drawn the 2010 satire album Robert Parker: Les Sept Pêchés capiteux, written by Benoist Simmat concerning American wine critic Robert M. Parker, Jr.
