= Saint-Laurent-des-Combes, Gironde =

Saint-Laurent-des-Combes
- Commune
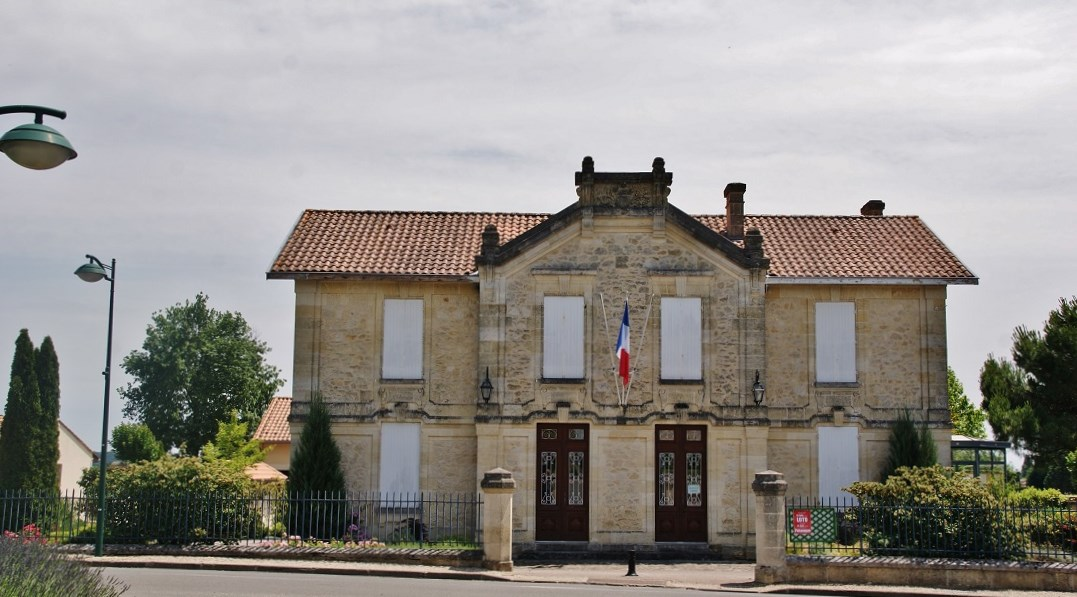
- The town hall in Saint-Laurent-des-Combes
- Location of Saint-Laurent-des-Combes
- Location within France Location within Nouvelle-Aquitaine
- Coordinates: 44°52′30″N 0°07′52″W
- Country: France
- Region: Nouvelle-Aquitaine
- Department: Gironde
- Arrondissement: Libourne
- Canton: Les Coteaux de Dordogne

Government
  - Mayor (2020–2026): Alain Vallade
- Area^{1}: 3.86 km^{2} (1.49 sq mi)
- Elevation: 21 m (69 ft)
- Highest elevation: 107 m (351 ft)
- Lowest elevation: 9 m (30 ft)
- Population (2023): 231
  - Density: 59.8/km^{2} (155/sq mi)
- Time zone: UTC+01:00 (CET)
  - Summer (DST): UTC+02:00 (CEST)
- INSEE/Postal code: 33426 /33330
- ^{1} French Land Register data, which excludes lakes, ponds, glaciers > 1 km^{2} (0.386 sq mi or 247 acres) and river estuaries.

Saint-Laurent-des-Combes (French pronunciation: [sɛ̃ loʁɑ̃ de kɔ̃b]; Occitan: Sent Laurenç de las Comas) is a commune in the Gironde department in Nouvelle-Aquitaine in southwestern France.

== Population ==
Historical population
Year	Pop.	±% p.a.
1968	394	—
1975	401	+0.25%
1982	418	+0.59%
1990	377	−1.28%
1999	347	−0.92%
2007	315	−1.20%
2012	254	−4.21%
2017	260	+0.47%
2023	231	−1.95%
Source: INSEE

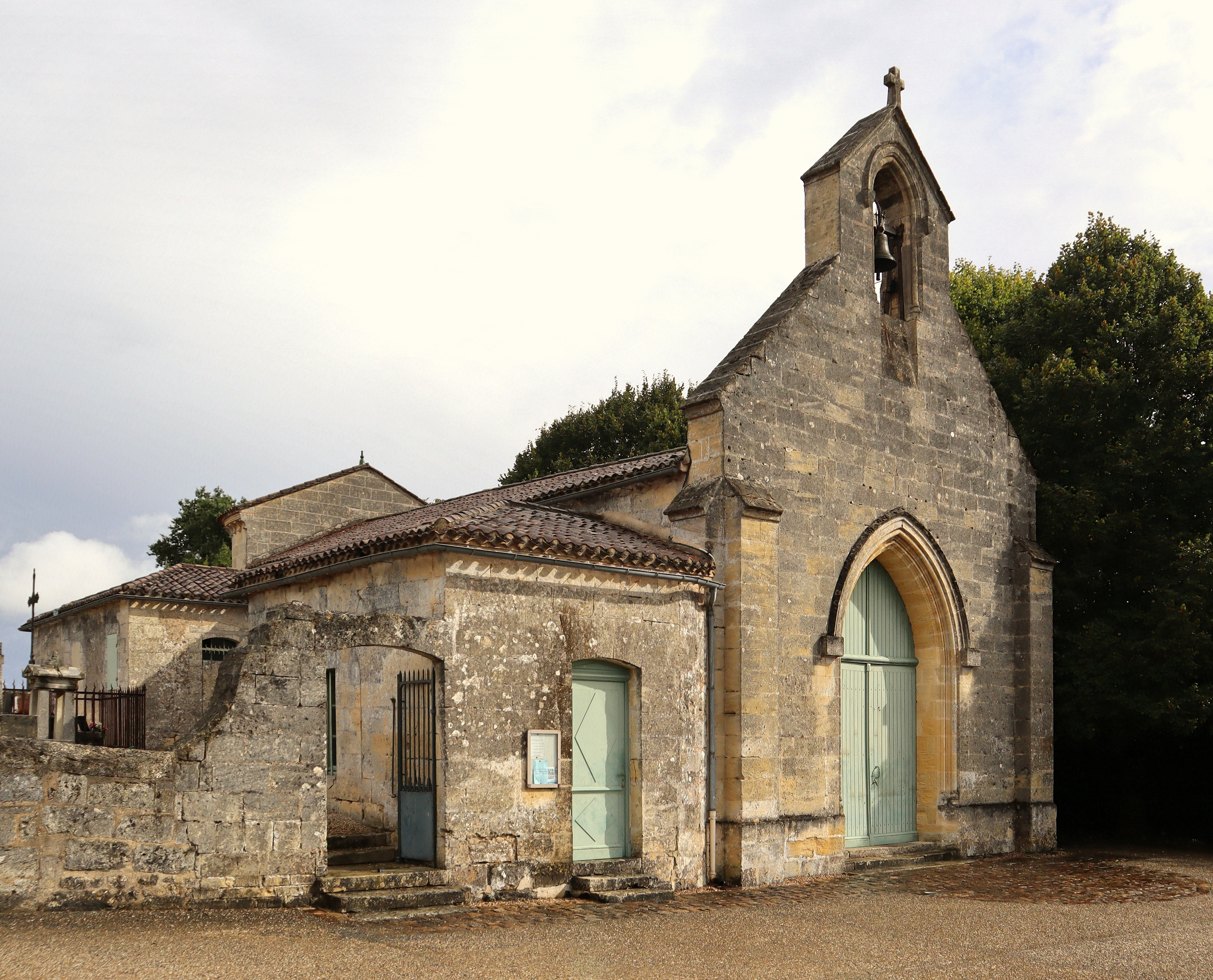
Église Saint-Laurent

== Notable people ==
- René Labusquiere (1919–1977), doctor who pioneered preventive medicine

== See also ==
- Communes of the Gironde department
