= Lussac, Gironde =

Lussac
- Commune
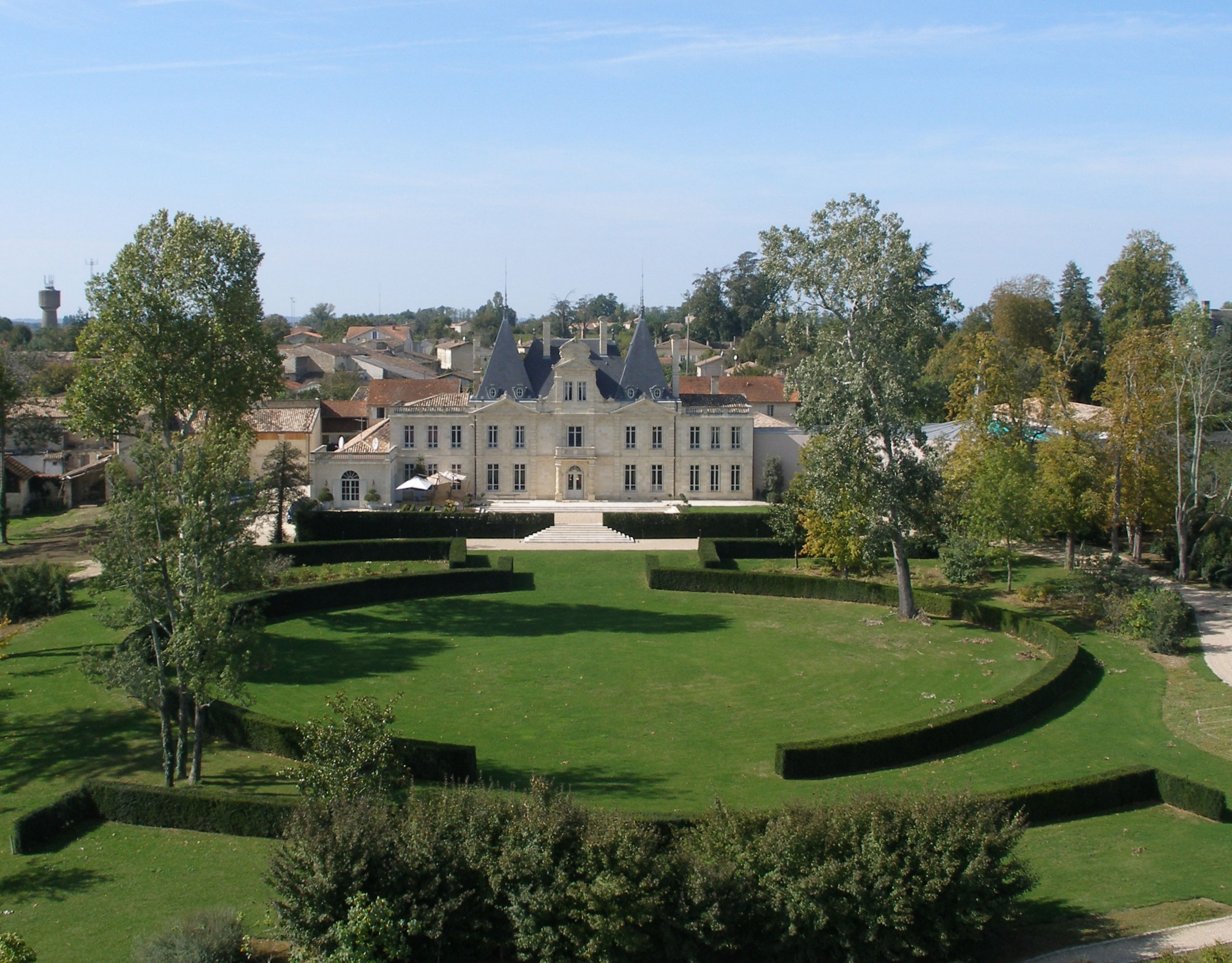
- Chateau

- Coat of arms
- Location of Lussac
- Location within France Location within Nouvelle-Aquitaine
- Coordinates: 44°57′03″N 0°05′42″W
- Country: France
- Region: Nouvelle-Aquitaine
- Department: Gironde
- Arrondissement: Libourne
- Canton: Le Nord-Libournais

Government
  - Mayor (2024–2026): Jean Didier Gatinel
- Area^{1}: 23.43 km^{2} (9.05 sq mi)
- Elevation: 95 m (312 ft)
- Highest elevation: 84 m (276 ft)
- Lowest elevation: 22 m (72 ft)
- Population (2023): 1,151
  - Density: 49.13/km^{2} (127.2/sq mi)
- Time zone: UTC+01:00 (CET)
  - Summer (DST): UTC+02:00 (CEST)
- INSEE/Postal code: 33261 /33570
- ^{1} French Land Register data, which excludes lakes, ponds, glaciers > 1 km^{2} (0.386 sq mi or 247 acres) and river estuaries.

Lussac (French pronunciation: [lysak]) is a commune in the Gironde department in Nouvelle-Aquitaine in southwestern France.

== Population ==
Historical population
Year	Pop.	±% p.a.
1968	1,556	—
1975	1,425	−1.25%
1982	1,428	+0.03%
1990	1,414	−0.12%
1999	1,333	−0.65%
2007	1,316	−0.16%
2012	1,308	−0.12%
2017	1,261	−0.73%
2023	1,151	−1.51%
Source: INSEE

== See also ==
- Château de Lussac (Lussac Saint-Emilion)
- Communes of the Gironde department
