= Gracia (Saint-Émilion) =

Gracia a Saint-Émilion unclassed microcuvée winery, emerging in the late 1990s as one of the best known "Vins de garage".

The winery also produces the second wine Angelots de Gracia.

The Gracia proprietor is Michel Gracia, a former Saint-Émilion stonemason. First appearing in 1997 to great success. In response to the decline in fashion of the "garage wine" that has been widely predicted, Michel Gracia maintains the garagiste approach has altered and has stated, "In the early years we went for over-ripe grapes and plenty of extraction, but now we're harvesting a touch earlier and looking for more finesse".

== Production ==
From its initial size of 1.9 hectares, the vineyard area has been expanded to 3 hectares. The grape varieties are composed of 80% Merlot, 15% Cabernet Franc and 5% Cabernet Sauvignon.

The annual production of the Grand vin is typically 8,000 bottles.
