= Lussac-Saint-Émilion AOC =

Lussac-Saint-Émilion (French pronunciation: [lysak sɛ̃t‿emiljɔ̃]) is an Appellation d'origine contrôlée (AOC) for red wine situated in the Bordeaux wine region. The appellation is located on the right bank of the Garonne and Dordogne rivers, about 45 kilometres (28 mi) from city of Bordeaux or 9 kilometres (5.6 mi) from the medieval village of Saint-Émilion. It is one of the so-called "Saint-Émilion satellites" situated around the appellation Saint-Émilion AOC itself.

== Terroir ==
The terroir of Lussac is characterized by the diversity of its soils, distributed between the plateaus, the sides of the hills, and small valleys.

To the south-east, the slopes are clayey-limestone, similar in nature to those in the Saint-Emilion appellation. To the west, there is an elevated gravel and sandy-gravel plateau, not very wide, and to the north, cold clayey soil or heavy clay is predominant. To the east, the subsoil consists of limestone beds which made excellent quarries for extracting soft building stone. To the north-west, there are a few stone quarries, as well as ferrugineous sand or clay.

== Winemaking ==
The grape varieties allowed in Lussac-Saint-Émilion are Cabernet Franc, Cabernet Sauvignon, Malbec and Merlot. Merlot usually dominates the blend. The allowed base yield is 45 hectolitres per hectare.

== Estates ==
In Lussac, the wine estates are essentially family-properties. The average size of each would be about 10 hectares (25 acres). A total of 900 hectares (2,200 acres) are cultivated by 95 independent vineyard owners and 530 hectares (1,300 acres) are exploited by members of the Puisseguin-Lussac-Saint-Emilion winemaking cooperative.
