= Montagne, Gironde =

Montagne
- Commune
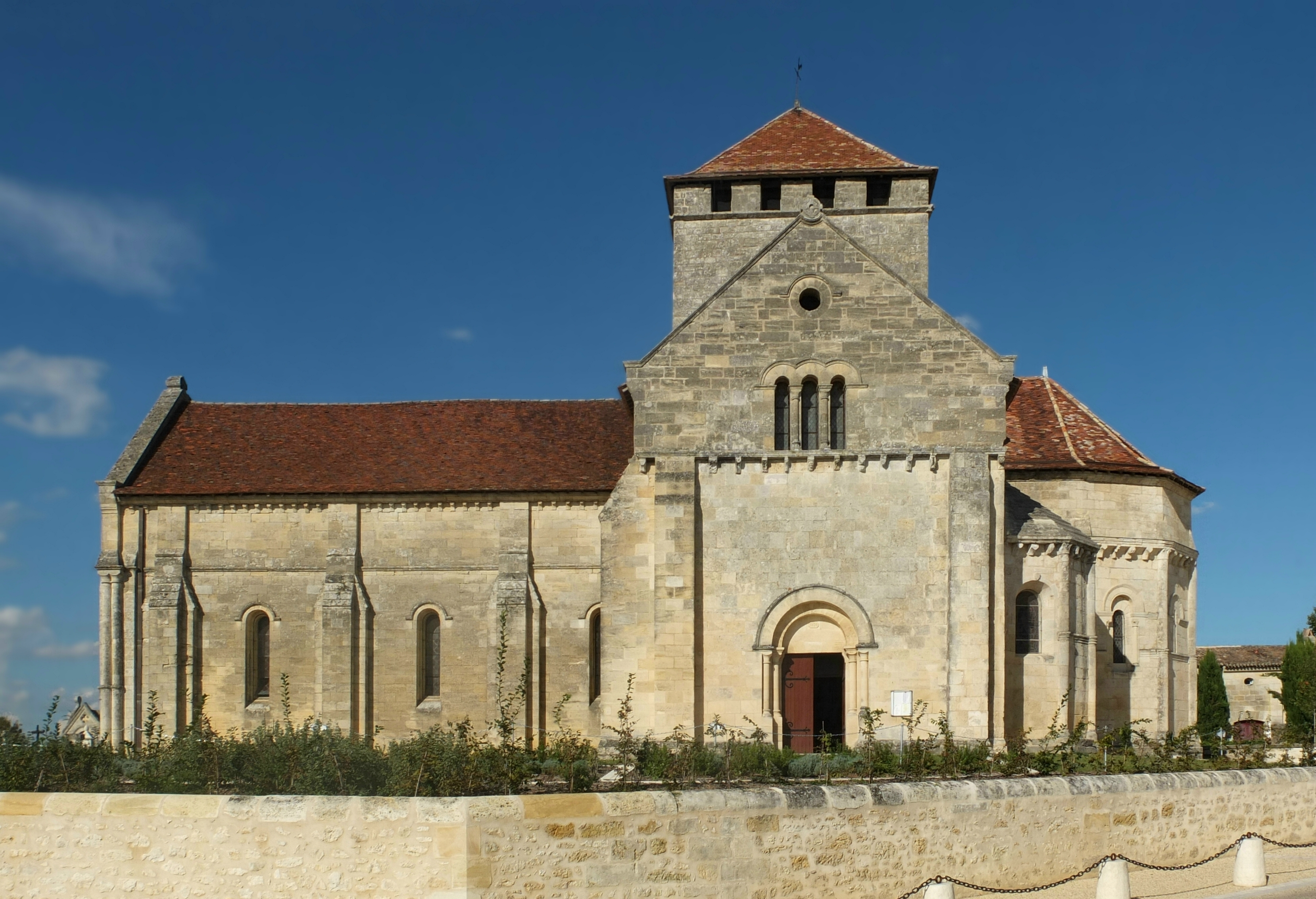
- St. Martin's church in Montagne

- Coat of arms
- Location of Montagne
- Location within France Location within Nouvelle-Aquitaine
- Coordinates: 44°55′52″N 0°07′42″W
- Country: France
- Region: Nouvelle-Aquitaine
- Department: Gironde
- Arrondissement: Libourne
- Canton: Le Nord-Libournais

Government
  - Mayor (2020–2026): Catherine Henry
- Area^{1}: 26.66 km^{2} (10.29 sq mi)
- Elevation: 92 m (302 ft)
- Highest elevation: 97 m (318 ft)
- Lowest elevation: 18 m (59 ft)
- Population (2023): 1,510
  - Density: 56.6/km^{2} (147/sq mi)
- Time zone: UTC+01:00 (CET)
  - Summer (DST): UTC+02:00 (CEST)
- INSEE/Postal code: 33290 /33570
- ^{1} French Land Register data, which excludes lakes, ponds, glaciers > 1 km^{2} (0.386 sq mi or 247 acres) and river estuaries.

Montagne (French pronunciation: [mɔ̃taɲ]; Occitan: Montanha) is a commune in the Gironde department in Nouvelle-Aquitaine in southwestern France. Set on a hillside, the municipality was known for its quarries in the nineteenth century.

== Population ==
Historical population
Year	Pop.	±% p.a.
1968	1,929	—
1975	1,913	−0.12%
1982	2,007	+0.69%
1990	1,802	−1.34%
1999	1,585	−1.42%
2007	1,689	+0.80%
2012	1,649	−0.48%
2017	1,524	−1.56%
2023	1,510	−0.15%
Source: INSEE

== See also ==
- Communes of the Gironde department
- Montagne-Saint-Émilion, a wine appellation situated in Montagne
