= Vignonet =

- Commune
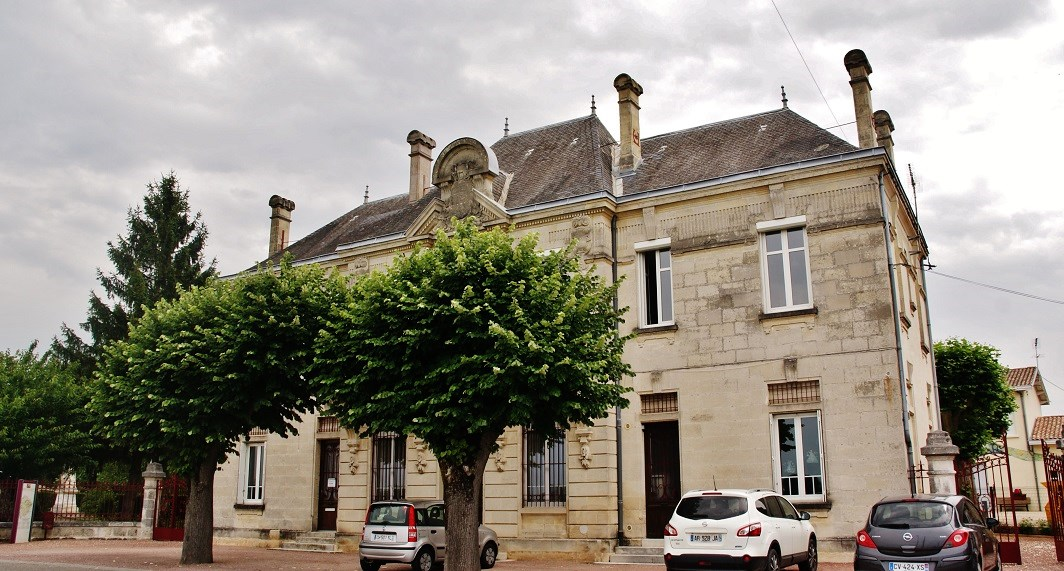
- The town hall in Vignonet
- Location of Vignonet
- Location within France Location within Nouvelle-Aquitaine
- Coordinates: 44°50′49″N 0°08′43″W
- Country: France
- Region: Nouvelle-Aquitaine
- Department: Gironde
- Arrondissement: Libourne
- Canton: Les Coteaux de Dordogne

Government
  - Mayor (2020–2026): Xavier Dangin
- Area^{1}: 4.15 km^{2} (1.60 sq mi)
- Elevation: 6 m (20 ft)
- Highest elevation: 13 m (43 ft)
- Lowest elevation: 3 m (9.8 ft)
- Population (2023): 459
  - Density: 111/km^{2} (286/sq mi)
- Time zone: UTC+01:00 (CET)
  - Summer (DST): UTC+02:00 (CEST)
- INSEE/Postal code: 33546 /33330
- ^{1} French Land Register data, which excludes lakes, ponds, glaciers > 1 km^{2} (0.386 sq mi or 247 acres) and river estuaries.

Vignonet (French pronunciation: [viɲɔnɛ]; Limousin: Vinhonet) is a commune in the Gironde department in Nouvelle-Aquitaine in southwestern France.

== Population ==
Historical population
Year	Pop.	±% p.a.
1968	640	—
1975	646	+0.13%
1982	580	−1.53%
1990	582	+0.04%
1999	533	−0.97%
2007	516	−0.40%
2012	540	+0.91%
2017	498	−1.61%
2023	459	−1.35%
Source: INSEE

== See also ==
- Communes of the Gironde department
