= Saint-Sulpice-de-Faleyrens =

- Commune
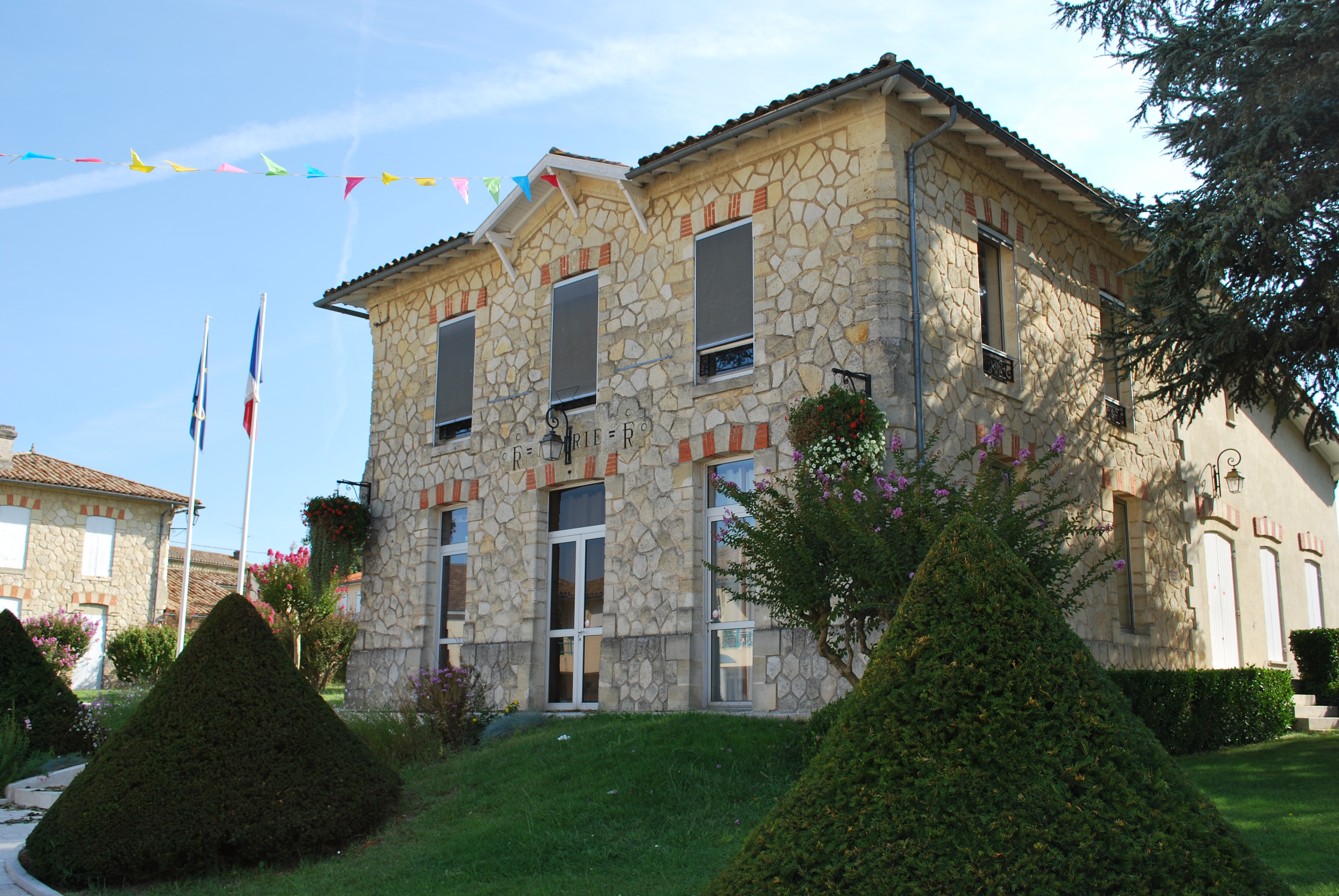
- The town hall in Saint-Sulpice-de-Faleyrens
- Location of Saint-Sulpice-de-Faleyrens
- Location within France Location within Nouvelle-Aquitaine
- Coordinates: 44°52′31″N 0°11′21″W
- Country: France
- Region: Nouvelle-Aquitaine
- Department: Gironde
- Arrondissement: Libourne
- Canton: Les Coteaux de Dordogne

Government
  - Mayor (2020–2026): Yvan Dumonteuil
- Area^{1}: 18.17 km^{2} (7.02 sq mi)
- Elevation: 11 m (36 ft)
- Highest elevation: 20 m (66 ft)
- Lowest elevation: 1 m (3.3 ft)
- Population (2023): 1,344
  - Density: 73.97/km^{2} (191.6/sq mi)
- Time zone: UTC+01:00 (CET)
  - Summer (DST): UTC+02:00 (CEST)
- INSEE/Postal code: 33480 /33330
- ^{1} French Land Register data, which excludes lakes, ponds, glaciers > 1 km^{2} (0.386 sq mi or 247 acres) and river estuaries.

Saint-Sulpice-de-Faleyrens (Languedocien: Sent Sulpici de Faleirens) is a commune in the Gironde department in Nouvelle-Aquitaine in southwestern France.

It is one of eight municipalities forming the jurisdiction of Saint-Emilion, which is a UNESCO World Heritage of Humanity for its historic vineyard landscape that has survived intact and in use.

== Geography ==
Saint-Sulpice-de-Faleyrens is located 35 km (22 mi) northeast of Bordeaux, between Libourne and Branne.

== Population ==
Historical population
Year	Pop.	±% p.a.
1968	1,219	—
1975	1,304	+0.97%
1982	1,625	+3.19%
1990	1,613	−0.09%
1999	1,583	−0.21%
2007	1,508	−0.60%
2012	1,456	−0.70%
2017	1,348	−1.53%
2023	1,344	−0.05%
Source: INSEE

== Economy ==
The main activity of the town is related to viticulture.

== Sights ==
- The Peyrefitte menhir is the largest menhir of Aquitaine. It was classified as a historical monument in 1889.

== See also ==
- Communes of the Gironde department
