= Amarna letters localities and rulers =

This is a list of Amarna letters–Text corpus, categorized by: Amarna letters–localities and their rulers. It includes countries, regions, and the cities or city-states. The regions are included in Canaan and the Levant.

The Amarna letters text corpus contains 382 numbered letters; there are "sub-Text corpora" in the letters, most notably the 68-letter corpus of Rib-Hadda of Gubla–(Byblos).

EA is for 'el Amarna'.

== Localities/rulers ==
Locality	Ruler	Notes:
Ahtiašna	Sur-Ašar	EA 319, line 4 (author)
(Akka)(=Acco); Acre, Israel; Biblical: Acco	Surata
(Akka)(=Acco); Acre, Israel; Biblical: Acco	Satatna
(Akšapa); Achshaph	Endaruta	EA 223, l 4; EA 366, l. 23; EA 367, l. 1
Alashiya ("Cyprus")	'King' of Alashiya	Seldom named: (Or referred to in other EA's); Exception: EA 114-(of Rib-Hadda of Gubla/Byblos), See: Amanmašša (author)–7 letters, EA 33–39
Amurru	Abdi-Ashirta
Amurru	Aziru
Arašni	Miya	EA 75, l. 30–"ruler of Arašni"
Arzawa	Tarhundaraba (Tarhuntaradu)	EA 31, l. 2 Pharaoh's letter to Tarhundaraba; Title: "Marriage negotiations, (in Hittite)"
Assyria	Ashur-uballit I	EA 15, l. 3, 16 (3) (author)
(Ašqaluna); Ascalon	Yidya
(Aštartu); Tell-Ashtara	Ayyab	EA 256 and 364 (author of 364)
(Aštartu); Tell-Ashtara	Biridašwa	Only referenced in EA 196 and 197-(letters of Biryawaza of Damascus)-(letters no. 3, 4 of 4)
Babylon	Burna-Buriash II
Babylon	Kadashman-Enlil I	EA's 1, 2, 3, 5 (author)
Bašan	Amawaše	EA 202, l. 3 (author)
(Biruta); Beirut, Lebanon	Ammunira	Referenced in the late Rib-Hadda corpus: EA 137–39. EA 141-43 (author)
(Biruta); Beirut, Lebanon	Yapa-Hadda/Yapah	(author) no 1—EA 97, "A bad reputation" no 2—EA 98, "Losses from Gubla to Ugarit"
Bit-Tenni	Balu--Mir	EA 260, l. 2 (author)
Byblos-(Gubla), Lebanon; Byblos, Lebanon	Rib-Hadda	68 letter sub-corpus (author)
Damascus	Biryawaza
Mizri (name of "Ancient Egypt"-(see: Mizraim))	Pharaohs:Amenhotep III and IV
Enišasi	'Abdi-Riša	EA 363 (author)
Enišasi	Šatiya	EA 187, l. 3 (author)
(Gazru) modern Gezer	Adda-danu	author of EA 292–294
(Gazru) modern Gezer	Ili-Milku	EA 286, l. 36 (reference)
(Gazru) modern Gezer	Milk-ilu	(numerous refs, author of 5 EA's)
(Gazru) modern Gezer	Yapahu	EA 297-299, 300, EA 378 (all authored)
Gintikirmil/Ginti	Tagi (Ginti mayor)	EA 264-66 (author)
Guddašuna	Yamiuta	EA 177, l. 2 (author)
Hasi	Ildayyi	EA 175, l. 3 (author)
Hasi	Mayarzana	EA 185, l 3 (author); EA 186, l 3 (author); Mayarzana's name only mentioned in EA 185/86. Hasi only mentioned here and in EA 175-(letter of Ildayyi). The subject of both EA 185/86 is Amanhatpe of Tušultu: Titles, 185: "An Egyptian traitor: [Amanhatpe of Tušultu]; 186: "Another report on the Egyptian traitor." (Note: some poetic line repetitions occur in both letters. EA 185 is 75 lines–undamaged.)
(Hasura); Hazor	'king' of Hasura	EA 228 (his people); EA 227, l. 3 ('king')
(Hasura); Hazor	'Abdi-Irši	EA 228, l. 3 (author)?
(Hasura); Hazor	'Abdi-Tirši	EA 228, l. 3 (author)?
Hašabu Heshbon?	Bieri	EA 174, l. 3 (author)
Hatti	Šuppiluliumaš (Suppiluliuma I)	EA 41, l. 1 (author)('king' of Hatti)
(Irqata); Arqa	Aduna (Irqata mayor)	EA 75, EA 140
(Urusalim); Jerusalem	Abdi-Heba	EA 280 (subject), 285-290 (author)
Kadesh-(Qidšu); Kadesh	Etakkama	See: EA 189: "Etakkama of Qadesh" (author)
Karaduniyaš; Babylonia-(Babylon)	Kadashman-Enlil I
Karaduniyaš; Babylonia-(Babylon)	Burna-Buriash II
(Kumidu); Kamed al lawz	Arašša	EA 198, l. 4 (author) title: "From Kumidu"
(Lakiša); Lachish	Šipṭi-Ba'la (Šipṭi-Ba'lu), (Šipṭi-Balu)
(Lakiša); Lachish	Zimredda (Lachish mayor)	3 EA references: EA 333, part of topic: "Plots and disloyalty" . Death reported in Abdi-Heba letter 4 of 6. EA 329 ( "Preparations under way" ) an undamaged, 20 line letter (author)
Lapana	Teuwatti	EA 193, l. 2 (author)
Magidda "Megiddo"	Biridiya	EA 244 (author)
Mittani-(Hanigalbat); Mittani	Tushratta	EA 17 thru 29 (author)
Muhraštu	Yaptih-Hadda	EA 288, l. 45; EA 335, l. 10
Mušihuna	Šuttarna
(Naharin); Mitanni		(See Mitanni)
Nii	Aki-Teššup	EA 59, l. 15, 18
Nuhašša-["Nuhasse"]	Addu-nirari	EA 51, l. 2 (author)
Northern Retjenu (Canaan)	'Abdina	EA 229 (author)
Retjenu (Canaan)	Ba'lu-mehir	EA 245, 257; (author) of 258–59
Retjenu (Canaan)	Dašru	EA 262-62 (author)
Retjenu (Canaan)	Hiziru	EA 336-37 (author)
Retjenu (Canaan)	Šub-Andu	EA's 301–306, (author)
(Pihilu); Pella, Jordan	Mut-Bahli; Mutbaal	no 1—EA 255, l. 3 no 2—EA 256, l. 2, 5 (author)
Qatna	Akizzi	EA 52-57 (author)
Qidšu Kadesh
Qiltu	'Abdi-Aštarti	EA 63-65 (author)
Qiltu?	Šuwardata	(author)
Rehob	Ba'lu-UR.SAG	EA 249-50 (author)
Ruhizzi	Arsawuya	Ruhizzi east of Kadesh-(Qidšu), east of the Anti-Lebanon
(Siduna); Sidon, Lebanon	Zimredda (Sidon mayor)	Referenced in 16 EA's. EA 144-45 (author)
Silu; Grk: Sile/Tjaru of Ancient Egypt; On the garrison-road: Way of Horus	Turbazu	EA 288, l. 41; 335, l. 10
(Šakmu); Shechem	Labaya	EA 252-54 (author)
Šamhuna	Šamu-Adda-(name #1-(?))	EA 225, l. 3 (author)
Šamhuna	Šum-Adda-(name #2-(?))	EA 224, l. 3 (author)
Šaruna	Rusmanya	EA 241, l. 3 (author)
Šashimi	'Abdi-Milki
'Syria'	Bayadi	EA 238, l. 2
'Syria'	Bayawa	EA 215; EA 216, l. 3 (author)
'Syria'	Dagan-takala	EA 317-318 (author)
'Syria'	Kurtuya	EA 220, l. 36 (author)
'Syria'	Paduzana; Baduzana	EA 239, l. 2 (author)
'Syria'	Tehu-Teššup	EA 58, l. 2 (author)
Tušultu	Amanhatpe	(Note: Amanhatpe, and the town-Tušultu are only referred to in the letter pairs: EA 185/86 [by Mayarzana of Hasi].)
Tyre Lebanon (called: Surru)	Abimilku	EA 146-155 (10)--(author); Not referenced elsewhere in the letter corpus (!)
Ugarit	Ammistamru; Ammittamru I	EA 45, l. 2 (author)
Ugarit	Niqm-Adda; Niqmaddu II	EA 49, l. 2 (author)(successor of Ammittamru)
Yursa	Pu-Ba'lu	EA 314-316 (author)

== Sub-corpus lists ==
=== No. 201–206: "Ready for marching orders (1–6)" ===
List of letters: EA 201–206.
Actually authored by the same scribe. Also scribed EA 195, See: Prostration formula.

Locality	Ruler	Notes:
1–Siribašani	Artamanya	EA 201 (author)
2–Bašan	Amawaše	EA 202, l 3 (author)
3–Šashimi	'Abdi-Milki	EA 203 (author)
4–(Qanu); Qanawat	'Ruler' of Qanu	EA 204 (author)
5–Tubu (town); Tob: (biblical)	'Ruler' of Tubu	EA 205 (author)
6–Naziba	'Ruler' of Naziba	EA 206 (author)

== Leaders only in reference ==
Leaders that are only referred to in the letter corpus.

Locality	Ruler	Notes:
(Ammiya); Amioun	'King' of Ammiya	Ammiya ref in 8 EA's; "king of Ammiya" in EA 139–40–(the Gubla (Byblos) letters); the first six in the Rib-Hadda Byblos letters.
Barga (kingdom)	'King' of Barga	EA 57, l. 3 damaged letter, referenced also referenced: Akizzi, king of Qatna
Danuna in eastern Cilicia-(?)	'King' of Danuna	EA 151 (reference)
Halunnu	'King' of Halunnu	EA 197, l. 14; Letter title: "Biryawaza's plight"
(Zinzar) modern Shaizar	'King' of Zinzar	EA 53 (reference)
"a governor of yours-(pharaoh) in a Vassalage"	Pamahu	EA 7, l. 76–(Burna-Buriash to Pharaoh)

== See also ==
- Foreign relations of Egypt during the Amarna period
