= Amarna letter EA 205 =

Ancient Armana literature

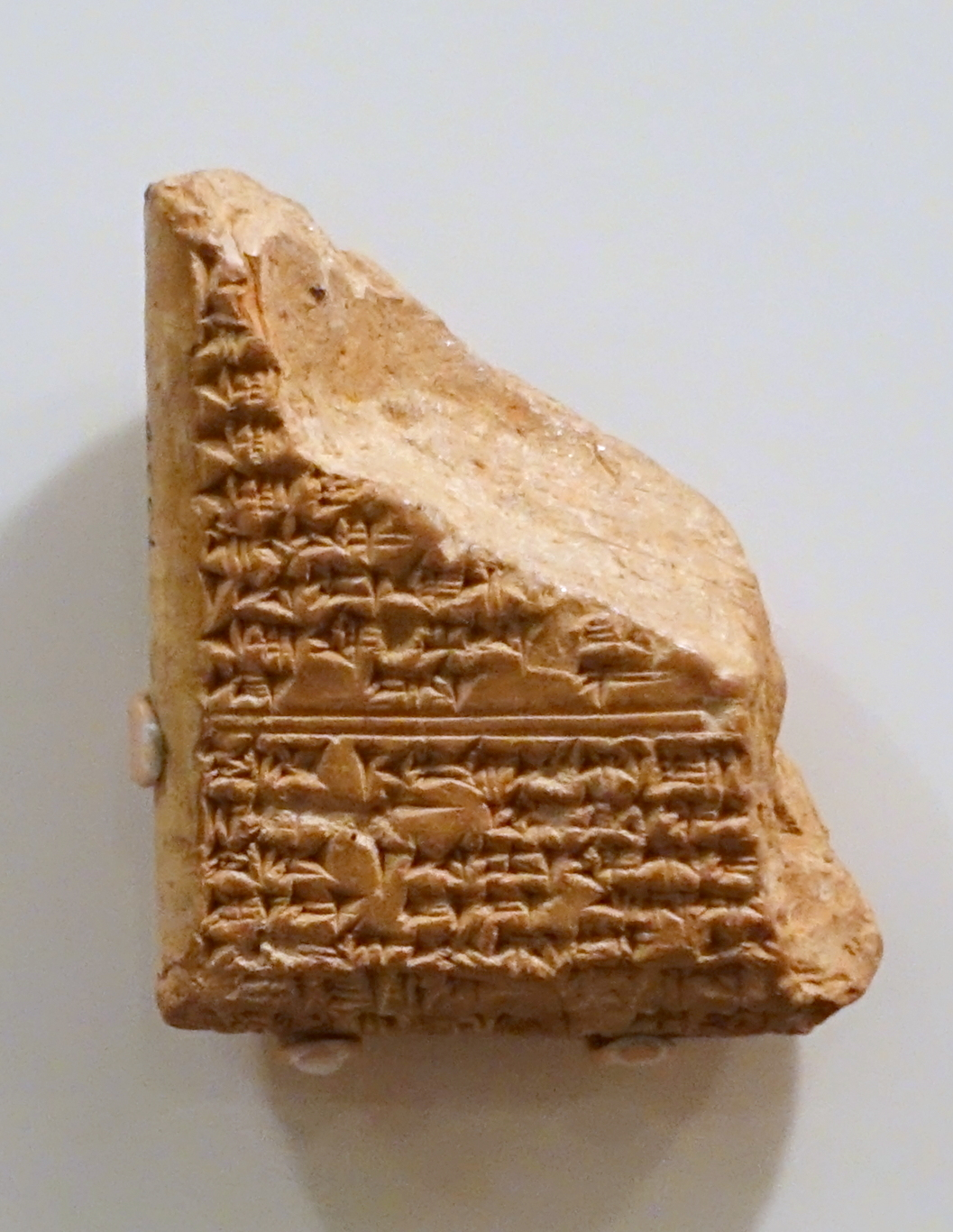
EA 26, fragment (Obverse). (high-resolution expandable photo)

Amarna letter EA 205, titled: "Ready for Marching Orders (5)" is a short letter from the Ruler of city Ṭubu. The title references that six mostly identical, very short, letters were scribed by the same scribe, from small regional towns; the scribe also is the writer of Amarna letter EA 195. It is not known if each letter was written at the location of each town, or from an alternative site, or sites.

The six towns are:

Ṣiribašani, Message of Artamanya
town 2, Message of Amawaše
Šashimi, Message of Abdi-Milki
Qanu, Message of the Ruler
Ṭubu, Message of the Ruler
Naziba, Message of the Ruler

The Amarna letters, about 300, numbered up to EA 382, are a mid 14th century BC, about 1350 BC and 20–25 years later, correspondence. The initial corpus of letters were found at Akhenaten's city Akhetaten, in the floor of the Bureau of Correspondence of Pharaoh; others were later found, adding to the body of letters.

== The letter ==
=== EA 205: "Ready for Marching Orders (5)" ===
EA 205, letter number one of one, from the small town of Tubu (Biblical Tob). (Not a linear, line-by-line translation.)

Obverse

(Lines 1-8)--Say to the king, my lord: Message of the ruler of Tubu, your servant. I fall at the feet of the king, my lord, the Sun of (all) peoples,^{1} 7 times plus 7 times.

Reverse

(lines 9-18)You have written to me to make preparations before the arrival of the archers. I am herewith, along with my troops and my chariots, at the disposition of the troops of the king, my lord, wherever they go.^{2} (complete EA 205, with no lacunae, lines 1-18)

== Cuneiform score, Akkadian, English ==
Cuneiform score (per CDLI, Chicago Digital Library Initiative), and Akkadian, and English.

Obverse

Paragraph I, (lines 1-8)

1.A-na ^{1=diš}lugal _EN_-ia
___Ana ^{1=diš}ŠÀR(ru) Bēlu-ia
___To ^{m=male=diš, 1}King Lord-mine
2.qí— ——- bil— ——-ma
___qabû — !
___ Speaking — !
3.um-ma diš-LÚ _iri_ Ṭù-bu
___umma diš-amēlu iri/URU Ṭù-bu
___ Message ^{m=male=diš, 1}Man, city(town)(city-state) Ṭubu (Biblical Tob)
4. _ARÁD_-ka a-na _gìri-meš_
___ ARÁD-ka, – ana gìri-meš
___ Servant-yours, – at (the) feet^{pl.}
5. 1=diš ŠÀR-(ru) be-li-ia
___ 1=m=male=diš Šàrru bēlu-ia
___ ^{m=male=diš, 1}King, Lord-mine

Obverse

11.a-na pa-ni
___ana pānu
___"Before"
12. _erín-meš-_ pí-ṭá-te
___ erín-meš pí-ṭá-te
___ army^{pl.} pitati

== See also ==
- Amarna letters–phrases and quotations
