= Stéphane Derenoncourt =

French vigneron

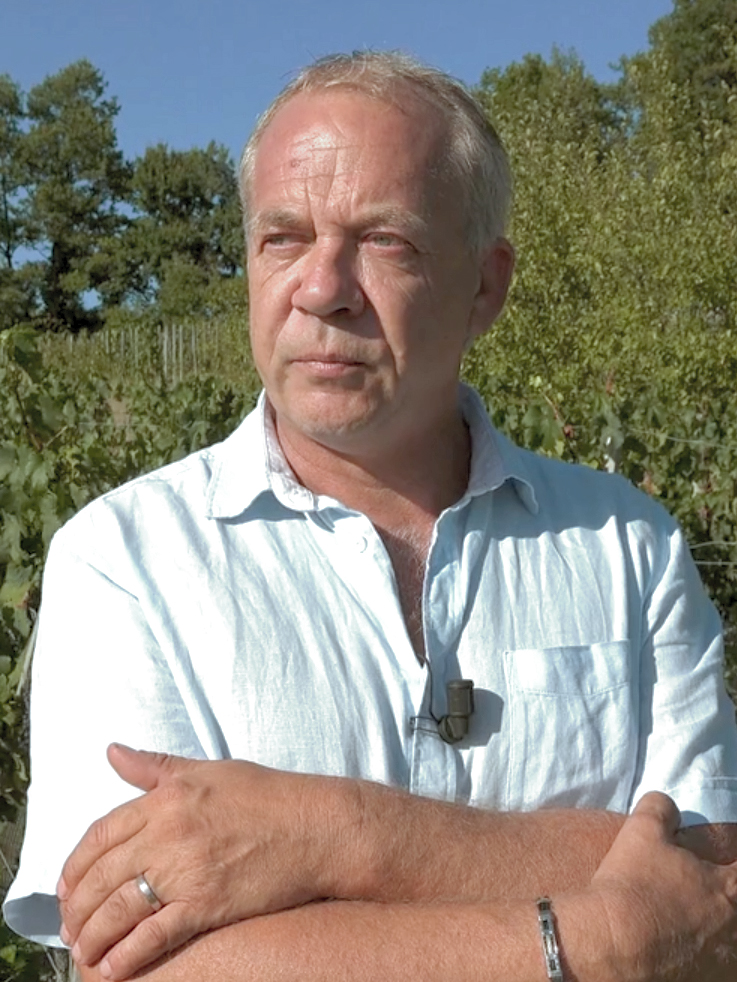
Stéphane Derenoncourt (2015)

Stéphane Derenoncourt is a French vigneron working as a consultant for numerous estates in Bordeaux and other wine producers worldwide. With his wife, Christine Derenoncourt, he runs Vignerons Consultants and owns Domaine de l'A in the Côtes de Castillon and Derenoncourt California in Napa Valley. He is entirely self-taught.

== Biography ==
Derenoncourt was born in Dunkirk in 1963. He arrived in Fronsac as a hitchhiker in 1982, where he worked several harvests before joining Château Fronsac in 1985. After working at several vineyards, he joined the cellar team at Château La Fleur Cailleau. In 1990, he accepted a position with the Corre-Macquin family at Château Pavie-Macquin, and in 1996 he became the winemaker for estates owned by Stephan von Neipperg, including Château Canon-la-Gaffelière and La Mondotte.

In 1999, Derenoncourt and his wife, Christine Derenoncourt, co-founded a wine consulting company specializing in vineyard management and winemaking. Through this consultancy, he has advised wineries in Bordeaux and other wine-producing regions in France and internationally.

== Consultant work ==
Derenoncourt began as a consultant in 1997, and in 1999 he and his wife started their own consultancy company, Vignerons Consultants. In 2010, Stéphane Derenoncourt, Julien Lavenu, Simon Blanchard and Frédéric Massie are associates and the consultancy becomes Derenoncourt Consultants. Derenoncourt and his team now works with a populous portfolio of estates in Bordeaux and elsewhere, including Domaine de Chevalier, Clos Fourtet, Clos de l'Oratoire and Chateaux Pavie-Macquin, Chateau Malescasse, Canon-la-Gaffelière, La Gaffelière, Petit Village, Smith Haut Lafitte, Brown, Les Carmes Haut-Brion, Rol Valentin, Prieuré-Lichine and Beauséjour Duffau-Lagarrosse. In June 2008, Derenoncourt and Vignerons Consultants was hired by Francis Ford Coppola to work on the Napa Valley property Rubicon Estate Winery. Other Derenoncourt projects abroad include engagements in Italy, Austria, Spain, Turkey, in Syria with Domaine de Bargylus, and in Beqaa Valley, Lebanon with Château Marsyas.

== Winery estates and wines ==
Derenoncourt and his wife owns the estate Domaine de l'A, in the Bordeaux sub-region Côtes de Castillon, and with the wine merchant François Thienpont, the negociant company Terra Burdigala, with an aim to provide a distribution outlet for quality estates in less glamorous and publicly profiled areas and regions. Derenoncourt has also been a member of the Montesquieu Wines buying team since 2006, selecting wines Montesquieu offers its clients.

In late 2009, Derenoncourt released his first California wine, Derenoncourt California, a project started in 2006. The 2006 vintage of Derenoncourt California features five single-vineyard wines: a Napa Valley Cabernet Sauvignon from Caldwell Vineyard, a Napa Valley Cabernet Franc from Caldwell Vineyard, a Napa Valley Merlot from Stagecoach Vineyard, a Napa Valley Syrah from Carneros, and a Lake County Cabernet Sauvignon from Red Hills Vineyard. The wines are produced at Arkenstone Vineyards on Howell Mountain. His inaugural U.S. wines received positive reviews from James Laube of the Wine Spectator, Joshua Greene of Wine & Spirits, and L. Pierce Carson of the Napa Valley Register, among others.

== See also ==
- French wine
- List of wine personalities
