= Saadé Family =

Greek Orthodox family from Latakia, Syria

The Saadé family is a prominent Greek Orthodox family from the Syrian coastal city of Latakia. They notably own two vineyards, Domaine de Bargylus in Syria and Château Marsyas in Lebanon, and have kept their production ongoing despite the chronic instability facing the Middle East.

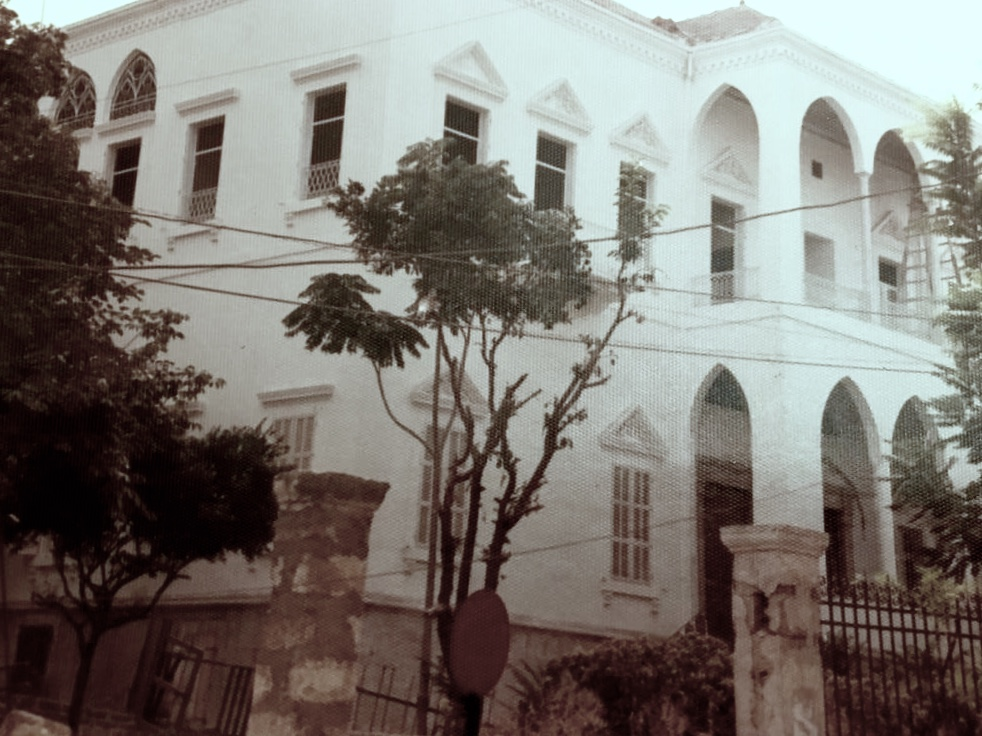
The Saadé palace in Latakia

== History and origins ==
The ancient harbor city of Latakia was known in antiquity as Laodicea in Syria or Laodicea ad mare (on the sea). It was founded by the Seleucid king Seleucus I Nicator, who named it after his mother and daughter.

The Saadé family belongs to the Orthodox patriarchate of Antioch, which together with the patriarchates of Constantinople, Alexandria and Jerusalem constitute one of the four seats of the Christian East.

This family of wealthy merchants, industrialists and major Syrian landowners has had many prominent representatives, among which Elias Saadé, Mikhaïl Saadé and Gabriel Saadé (1854–1939) as well as the latter's sons Wadih Saadé (1883–1968), Edouard Saadé (1885–1952) and Rodolphe Saadé (1900–1958). Their cousin Angèle Ibrahim married the brother of former prime minister of Syria Fares al-Khoury, grandfather of the Syrian poet and writer Colette Khoury.

According to some sources, the Saadé family famously treated with respect and acted fairly towards peasants working on its lands, unlike many other feudal landowners. They owned extensive properties throughout the country, held not only by male but also by female members of the family, which indicated their progressive spirit for the time.

In 1840, Elias Saadé undertook an in-depth reform of olive tree culture and production methods in the Syrian coastal area. He married Angelina Elias, the daughter of the English consul Moussa Elias, whose son Yacoub Elias was consul of the German Empire. Her nephew was the traveler and writer Edouard Elias Bacha.

His son Mikhaïl Saadé, a prominent city dignitary, welcomed to his home during his visit to Latakia in 1879 the Ottoman governor of Syria Midhat Pasha, who later became the Ottoman empire's Grand Vizir and prominent reformer. It is ironic that many members of the Saadé family, among which Gabriel Saadé (1854–1939) and his sons Wadih and Edouard, were condemned to death by a military tribunal several decades later in 1914 for their alleged political activities against the empire. The death sentences will nevertheless not be carried out.

His other son, Gabriel Saadé, was also a prominent landowner and trader. He married Marianna Ibrahim from the city of Antioch. One of his family enterprises, Gabriel Saadé & fils, is mentioned as having opened one of the first cotton ginning stations in Syria in the 1920s by attaching it to its modern olive oil mill facility.

In 1943, Gabriel's son Wadih Saadé was elected member of the Syrian parliament. He previously held the position of vice-president of the council of the Alawite State established during the French mandate era. According to some sources, he also subscribed, along with his brother Edouard, to a fund supporting Iraqi rebels against British rule.

Gabriel's other son Edouard Saadé upheld his thesis in 1905 at the International institute of Agriculture of Beauvais along with his cousin Toufick Saadé. In 1912, Toufick and his brother Habib Saadé acquired an agricultural property in the village of Meneou, in the Larnaca district in Cyprus, in which he planted 13,000 trees, the majority of which were carobs and olive trees. It was reported in the 1916 edition of the Commonwealth Shipping Committee publication that the "[tobacco] industry received considerable impetus this year from the preparation of Latakia blend from Messrs Saadé of Larnaca…". The 1922 edition of the Cyprus Agricultural Journal states that "Mr Habib Saadé of Latakia, the owner of the Meneou farm, has paid a short visit to Cyprus. It is understood that he is going to commence planting tobacco at his farm and cure it in the same way that it is done in Latakia…".

Toufick's nephew, Chafic Saadé, worked with one of the oldest British tobacco brokers Clagett, Brachi & Co for the sale of his yearly production. Edouard Saadé – or his son Emile – is mentioned among the administrators and shareholders of the Société des Asphaltes et Pétroles de Lattaquié, a French company based in Paris.

The listing of Syria's main merchants in the 1907 edition of Kelly's Directory of merchants, manufacturers and shippers, mentions four members of the Saadé family among the eight leading merchants of the city of Latakia.

His youngest grandson Rodolphe Saadé (1900–1958) was a prominent merchant, industrialist and landowner who travelled frequently to Europe and the United States.

Sharing his vision for his country, he declared to the American geologist Raymond E. Crist (who mentions it in his book published in 1962, Land for the fellahin: land tenure and land use in the Near-East) during his visit to Syria: "...our wealth is in agriculture and our industries should be based on it." He will also prove his pioneering spirit in recruiting Italian engineers and propose to the then-Syrian president Husni al-Za'im the construction of a modern port in Latakia. He was honorary consul of the Netherlands in Latakia until his death in 1958.

It is worth noting that the Saadé family also owned the "Régie des Tabacs et Tombacs" in Latakia which held the commercial monopoly of the highly-praised tobacco produced in the area.

The Saadé family was also instrumental in the creation of the mountain resort of Slenfeh in the alawite mountain who was a particularly praised destination for the Latakia and Aleppo upper-classes.

Rodolphe married Odette Nauphal, daughter of Lebanese member of parliament under the French mandate Abdallah Nauphal, scion of a family originating from the ancient Arab Christian kingdom of the Ghassanids who served for over three centuries in the Ottoman administration. The latter is the nephew of Baron Selim de Nauphal (1828–1902) who was state councilor and professor at the institute of oriental languages of the ministry of foreign affairs of Tsarist Russia. His paternal grandfather Abdallah Bek Nauphal (1796–1879) (He was granted the title of "Bek" in 1855) took part in the government of Ibrahim Bacha, the son of Muhammad Ali of Egypt, during the latter conquest of Syria. He wrote a history of these events which was published much later under the title " مذكرات تاريخية" (transl. "Historical notes") attributed to unknown author. He later held the position of first advisor to the Mutassarif of Mount-Lebanon Daoud Bacha and subsequently as Qaïmmaqam of the Kura district. The latter nephew Nicolas Bek Nauphal (1817-1895) was elected member of the Ottoman parliament in Istanbul in 1876. He became famous for ridiculing the Ottoman capital during one of the parliamentary session by declaring: "We come from the provinces and have been voting since the beginning of the Tanzimat. Istanbul has only started this year in taking part in the process." His maternal grandfather Christophe Catzeflis, scion of a family of Greek descent who allegedly descended from the Palaiologos of Constantinople, was consul of various European powers among which Austria-Hungary, Denmark and Sweden-Norway. Among other guests, he welcomed French poet and statesman Alphonse de Lamartine during his visit in the East. The beauty of his wife "Lady Jane" was praised by many travelers and diplomats among which Frederick Arthur Neale who went so as to translate in English one of the poems dedicated to her in his "Eight years in Syria, Palestine and Asia Minor from 1842 to 1850" published in 1851. Abdallah Nauphal's namesake and grandson is CEO of Insight Investments.

Johnny Saadé, the son of Rodolphe, refocused the family activities in the winemaking and tourism fields. He lives with his wife in Beirut. The latter is the daughter of Louis Ziadé (1890-1968), who graduated from the Lille law faculty and was elected seven times in a row president of the Aleppo Bar association in Syria where he lived for 25 years before returning to Lebanon to become member of the Lebanese parliament. He was, at some point, among the favorite candidates to the presidency of the Republic of Lebanon under French mandate. He resided at the Ziadé Palace in Zokak el-Blatt. He was the first cousin of the then Maronite archbishop of Beirut Ignatius Ziadé. His paternal grandmother was the daughter of Youssef Allam, one of the leading silk traders of Mount-Lebanon in the 19th century and whose activities extended to Egypt and the Syrian hinterland. He married Mathilde Bekhyt, daughter of Georges Bekhyt, a rich cotton merchant on the Alexandria exchange in Egypt. Her uncle was the lawyer Paul Nujaym -whose father Faris Nujaym was «cited in one pre-1914 source as the Dean of Mount-Lebanon's doctors»-, also known under his pen name Paul Jouplain, who held a doctorate from the Paris faculty of law and was one of the main exponents of the idea of a Greater Lebanon. He published in 1908 La question du Liban, which quickly became the definitive book on the subject especially during the Paris peace conference in 1919. Her first cousin, Marie Bekhyt married the Lebanese painter Georges Daoud Corm. Their son is Lebanese economist and historian Georges Corm.

Among other members of the Saadé family, special mention can be made of Gabriel W.Saadé, a prominent Syrian historian who made great contributions to our knowledge of the ancient city of Ugarit. He wrote on various cultural and historical subjects. He also founded the archeological museum of Latakia. In the 1940s, he cofounded the Orthodox Youth Movement in Lebanon and Syria which was instrumental in the cultural and educational renaissance within the Patriarchate of Antioch. He was made Chevalier de la Légion d'honneur in 1989. His niece, Leila Badre, is the famous archaeologist and director of the Museum of the American University of Beirut.

Claire Saadé, the mother of the famous Egyptian-born actor Omar Sharif, is also mentioned as a member of this prominent family.

Several members of the Saadé family were active within the Orthodox community of Latakia and made various donations to the Patriarchate of Antioch in the last two centuries. For instance, Elias Saadé rebuilt in 1845 the episcopal church of St Nicholas as rendered by a commemorative plaque. The leadership of the orthodox community of Latakia was exclusively held for the last two centuries by a member of the Saadé family. Their position was reflected in the special section allocated to the family in the various city churches.

== The vineyards ==
The creation of both vineyards took place in 1997 when Johnny Saadé and his two sons Karim and Sandro founded Domaine de Bargylus in Syria and Château Marsyas in the Beqaa valley in Lebanon. Soil as well as climatic studies were undertaken and the first vines are planted in 2003.

The first vintages seem to be 2006 for Bargylus and 2007 for Château Marsyas.

The Saadé family has apparently put in place very strict quality protocols for both their vineyards.

Karim Saadé and Sandro Saadé have kept the production going for Bargylus despite the raging war in Syria. They are managing their estate from Beirut having been unable to visit it since the beginning of the conflict.

The Explosion, which took place in Beirut on August 4, 2020, destroyed their administrative offices and heavily injured Johnny Saadé and his son Sandro.

The wines produced by the family estates are regularly graded by international wine critics.

The family mansion of Ottoman-Venetian style was severely damaged during the February 6th 2023 earthquake which struck Syria and Turkey. It is currently being renovated.
