= Naziba =

Amarna letters location

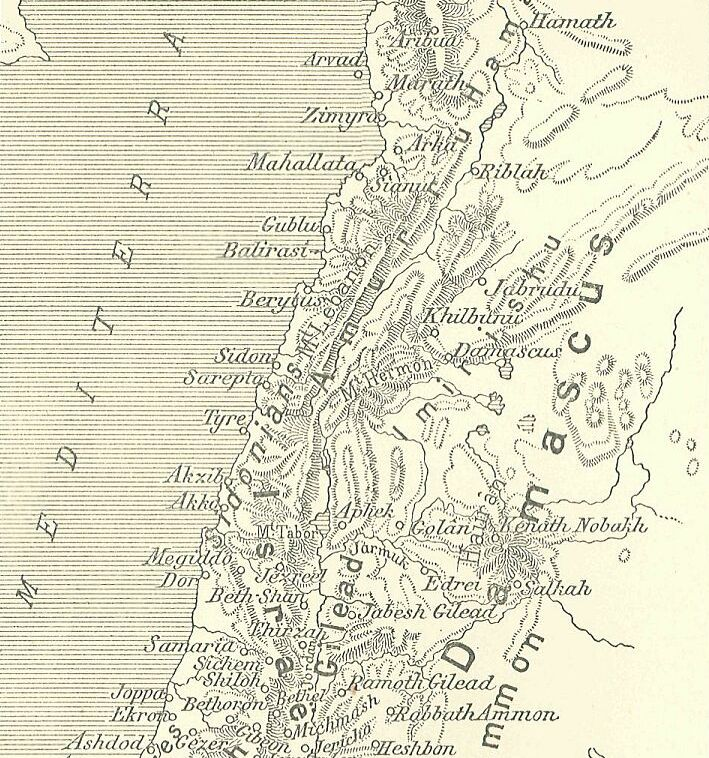

Naziba, was a small 'city', or 'city-state' south of Dimašqu-(Damascus), in the 1350–1335 BC Amarna letters correspondence. The town of Naziba was located near Amarna letters Qanu, now named Qanawat, and biblical Kenath.

Naziba, is part of a 6-letter series of letters, written by the same scribe, all entitled: "Ready for marching orders (1-6)". The letters are mostly identical, with only the city's Ruler and the location changing; they are letters EA 201-EA 206, (EA for 'el Amarna').

== EA 206, for the "ruler of Naziba" ==
Say to the king, my lord: Message of the ruler of Naziba, your servant. I fall at the feet of the king, my lord, 7 times plus 7 times. You hav[e wr]it[ten] to make preparations before the arrival of the archers, and I am herewith, along with my troops and my chariots, at the disposition of the archers. —EA 206, lines 1-17 (complete)

== List of the 6-letter series ==
1. EA 201-marching orders (1)—for Artamanya of Siribašani
2. EA 202-marching orders (2)—for Amawaše of Bašan(?)
3. EA 203-marching orders (3)—for 'Abdi-Milki of Šashimi
4. EA 204-marching orders (4)—for the ruler of Qanu, called Qanawat
5. EA 205-marching orders (5)—for the ruler of Tubu (town)
6. EA 206-marching orders (6)—for the ruler of Naziba
7. Additional by scribe: EA 195—title: "Waiting for the Pharaoh's words" – by Biryawaza of Dimašqu (Damascus)

== See also ==
- Tubu (town), for the "ruler of Tubu"
- Qanawat-(Qanu)
- Amarna letters–localities and their rulers
