= Abdi-Riša =

Mayor of Enišasi

Abdi-Risa

King of Enisasi
- Reign: c. 1340 BC

Abdi-Riša (fl. c. 1340 BC) was a ruler of Enisasi during the period of the Amarna letters correspondence (1350–1335 BC). Another mayor of Enisasi, Šatiya, is found in the Amarna letters corpus. The name "Abdi-Riša" means "servant-Riša".

Abdi-Riša is only referenced in his own letter EA 363, a letter to pharaoh, (EA for 'el Amarna').

Letter no. 363 is a unique letter, being part of a letter–series, (by the same scribe):

EA 174-(1), "Report on Amqu (1)"
EA 175-(2), "Report on Amqu (2)"
EA 176-(3), "Report on Amqu (3)"
EA 363-(4), "Report on Amqu (4)"

the Amqu being the "Beqaa Valley area" of Lebanon. As letter EA 363 was discovered later, (in a separate in-situ deposit), than the original letters of the Amarna letters correspondence, it is undamaged.

== Abdi-Riša letter ==
EA 363, title: "A joint report on Amqu (4)"

Say to the king-(i.e. Pharaoh), my lord, my god, my Sun: Message of Abdi-Riša, your servant, the ruler of E(ni)šasi. I fall in the dirt under the feet of the king, my lord, 7 times and 7 times. Look, we ar(e) in Amqu, in cities of the king, my lord, and Etakkama, the ruler of Qinsa-(Kadesh), assisted the troops of Hatti and set the cities of the king, my lord, on fire. May the king, my lord, take cognizance, and may the king, my lord, give archers that we may (re)gain the cities of the king, my lord, and dwell in the cities of the king, my lord, my god, my Sun. -EA 363, lines 1-23 (complete)

The actual written name used for Enišasi in this letter is: Ešasi.

== See also ==
- Amarna letters–localities and their rulers
