= Ishtob =

Ishtob was one of the small Syrian Kingdoms that made up Aram.

- In 2 Samuel 10:6 it is listed as one of the kingdoms that Ammon hired soldiers from

Ishtob also means "man of Tob".
