= Château Brown =

Bordeaux wine

Coordinates: 44.75876°N 0.58866°W

Château Brown is a Bordeaux wine from the Pessac-Léognan appellation, unranked in the Classification of Graves wine. The winery and vineyards are located south of the city of Bordeaux, just north of Château Olivier with property within the communes of Gradignan, Villenave-d'Ornon and Léognan.

In addition to a red and dry white Grand vin the estate produces red and dry white second wines under the label Colombier de Château Brown.

== History ==
Evidence points to cultivation of vines since the 12th century, although the modern history begins with the purchase of the estate by the Scottish trader John Lewis Brown (with ownership history of the present day estates Château Cantenac-Brown and Château Boyd-Cantenac) near the end of the 18th century.

In 1939 Château Brown was bought by André Bonnel, but viticulture was stopped in the 1950s and for nearly twenty years there was no winemaking until the vineyard was replanted. Due to the pause in activity the estate was ineligible for consideration in the Graves Classification of 1953 and 1959. Sold by Jean-Claude Bonnel to Bernard Barthe the estate saw large investment and effort, and in 2004 it was acquired by the Mau family of Yvon Mau Négociants and the Dutch liquor company Dirkzwager, with Barthe retaining 20% interest in the estate.

Château Brown is currently managed by Jean-Christophe Mau with Stéphane Derenoncourt as consultant oenologist of the vinification of the red wines and Philippe Dulong in charge of white wine.

== Production ==
From a 50 hectare estate, the vineyard area consists of 23.5 hectares of which are planted with grape varieties of 65% Cabernet Sauvignon, 30% Merlot and 5% Petit Verdot. The remaining 4.5 hectares are cultivated with white varieties of 70% Sauvignon blanc and 30% Sémillon.

Of the Grand vin Château Brown there is annually produced around 80,000 bottles of the red wine and approximately 20,000 bottles of the dry white. The second wines Colombier de Château Brown typically have an annual production of 25,000 bottles of the red and 5,000 bottles of the dry white.
