= Syrian wine =

Wine making in Syria

Syrian wine is wine produced in Syria.

As of 2023, there is only one commercial vineyard in Syria, Domaine de Bargylus.

Syria has an old wine culture. A grape press, dates back around 8,000 BC is the oldest preserved wine relic, which was found near Damascus. During the Hellenistic and Roman periods notable wines were produced. Later on Christian Orthodox monks continued cultivating the wine. Production continued during the rise of Islam.

== See also ==
- Winemaking
- Syrian cuisine
- Golan Heights Winery, an Israeli winery operating on territory legally claimed by Syria
