= Enišasi =

Historical city-state

Enišasi, was a city, or city-state located in the Beqaa Valley-(called Amqu, or Amka) of Lebanon, during the 1350-1335 BC Amarna letters correspondence. Of the 382–Amarna letters, Enišasi is only referenced in two letters. Enišasi was located near Hašabu, (Tell Hašbe), and Hasi, (Tell Hizzin?), southwest of Baalbek.

Two 'mayors', or rulers of Enišasi were Šatiya and Abdi-Riša, who each authored a letter to the Egyptian pharaoh, EA 187- (title: A daughter sent to the Pharaoh), and EA 363- (title: A joint report on Amqu–(4)). (EA is for 'el Amarna'.)

== See also ==
- Abdi-Riša, mayor
- Šatiya, mayor
- Amarna letters
- Amarna letters–localities and their rulers
