= Domaine de Bargylus =

Wine estate in the Coastal Mountain Range, Syria

Domaine de Bargylus is a wine estate on the slopes of the Coastal Mountain Range in Syria. These mountains, known as Mount Bargylus in the Hellenistic and Roman periods, produced notable wines up until the rise of Islam. Domaine de Bargylus is managed by two brothers Karim and Sandro Saadé, with the assistance of renowned consultant Stéphane Derenoncourt. It has been cited by wine critic Jancis Robinson as "arguably the finest wine of the Eastern Mediterranean".

== History ==
The Saadé family began works on the winery in 2003. The first vintage was produced in 2006. The Saadé family, of Orthodox Christian origins, is originally from the coastal city of Latakia, known in ancient times as Laodicea ad Mare (i.e. "Laodicea-by-the-sea"). The Saadé family traces its mercantile roots to the 18th and 19th century with prominent representatives such as Gabriel Saadé (1854-1939) and Rodolphe Saadé (1900-1956). With an initial involvement in commodities’ trading and various industries, the family developed maritime and land transport activities on the initiative of Johnny Saadé, Rodolphe’s son, in Syria, Lebanon, Jordan, Iraq, and France. Johnny Saadé shifted his activities to the wine making, tourism and real estate fields.

The family owns another winery in Lebanon's Beqaa valley, Château Marsyas.

Other members of this Latakian family are Syrian intellectual and historian Gabriel W.Saadé (1922-1997) and his niece Leila Badre, a prominent Lebanese-Syrian archaeologist.

== Operations ==
The vineyard is situated at 990 m, facing the Mediterranean. The soil is made of limestone, with some clay. The area has high daytime variation and relatively high rainfall. Two wines both in Francophile style are being produced. The Sauvignon Blanc and Chardonnay grapes for the white wine, and Cabernet Sauvignon, Syrah, and Merlot for the red. In 2015, Domaine de Bargylus produced 45 thousands bottles of wine, and sold around the world. The vineyard has been targeted by Islamist rebels during the Syrian civil war.

== See also ==
- Syrian wine
- Winemaking
