= Château Rol Valentin =

Coordinates: 44.9111°N 0.1672°W

Château Rol Valentin is a Bordeaux wine from the appellation Saint-Émilion Grand Cru, an area next to Saint-Émilion proper. Do not confuse such wines with those that are ranked Grand cru in the Classification of Saint-Émilion wine. The winery is located in the Right Bank of France’s Bordeaux wine region in the commune of Saint-Émilion, in the department Gironde.

The wine's small production and use of oak in combination with high prices and ratings places it among Saint-Émilion's "Vins de garage".

== History ==
In 1994 the estate was acquired by Eric Prisette, a retired professional footballer, and his wife Virginie. Rol Valentin employs Stephane Derenoncourt as consultant oenologist.

== Production ==
The vineyard area extends 4.6 hectares, with the grape varieties of 85% Merlot, 8% Cabernet Franc and 7% Cabernet Sauvignon.

There is typically an annual production of 14,000 bottles.
