= Château Marsyas =

Lebanese vineyard

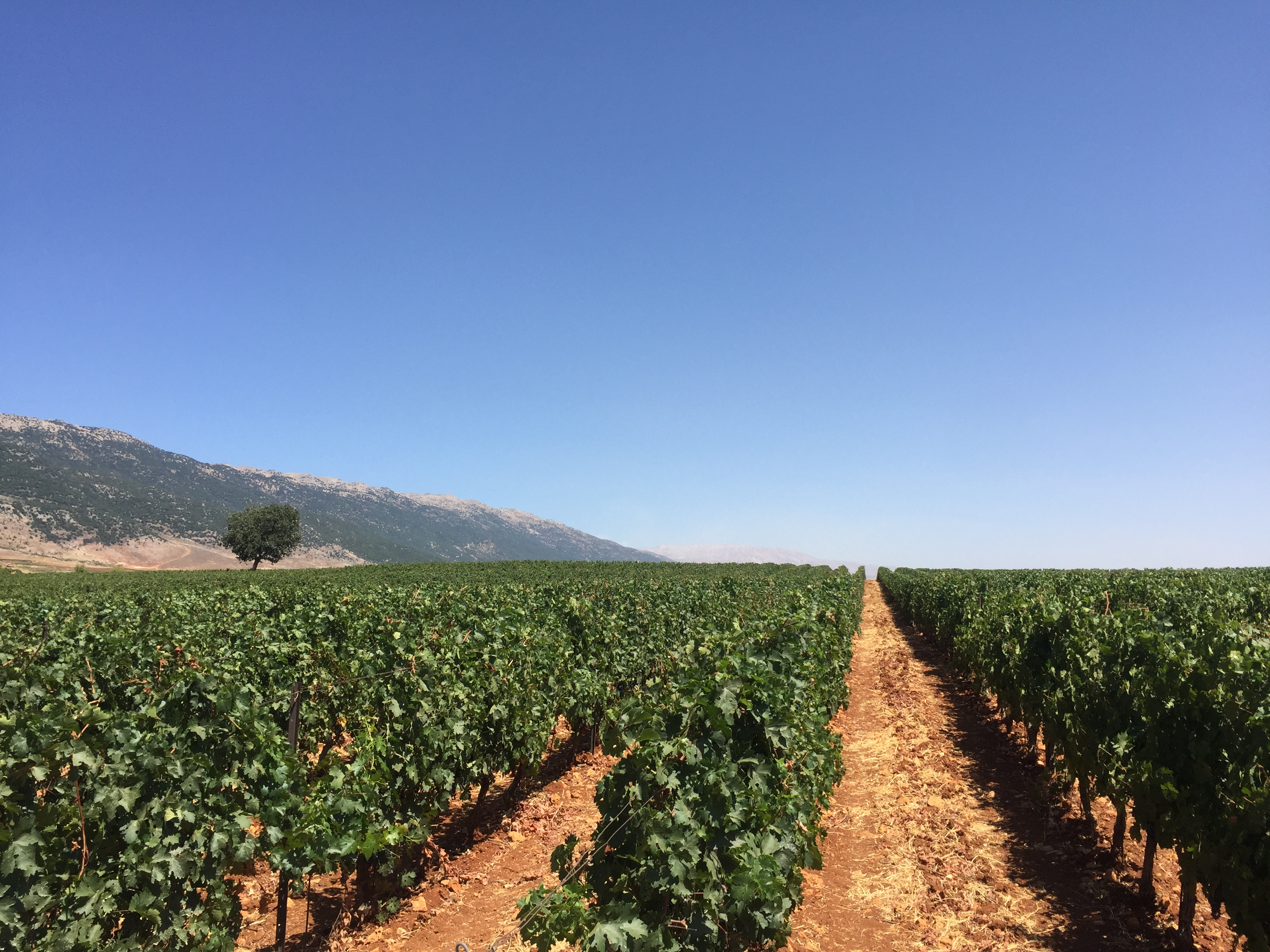
Chateau Marsyas in the Beqaa valley

Château Marsyas is a vineyard located in the Beqaa Valley in Lebanon. The name of the property stems from the ancient Greek name of the Bekaa valley known as the Marsyas valley in Hellenistic times.

The estate's area is around 60 hectares (150 acres), situated in the villages of Kefraya and Tell Dnoub. The Saadé family, who runs the vineyard, also owns and operates the Domaine de Bargylus estate in Syria.

== History ==
The Saadé family is a Greek Orthodox Christian family from the coastal city of Latakia in Syria, known in ancient times as Laodicea ad Mare ("Laodicea-by-the-sea"). The Saadé family traces its mercantile roots to the 18th and 19th century, with prominent representatives such as Gabriel Saadé (1854-1939) and Rodolphe Saadé (1900-1956). With an initial involvement in commodities’ trading and various industries, the family developed maritime and land transport activities on the initiative of Johnny Saadé, Rodolphe’s son, in Syria, Lebanon, Jordan, Iraq, and France.

The winery was established in 2007, at which date it produced its first vintage.

== Grape varieties ==
Red wines are made with a blend of Cabernet Sauvignon, Syrah and Merlot.
