= Šatiya =

Phoenician writer

Šatiya, also Satiya, or Shatiya (fl. c. 1340 BC) was the mayor or ruler of Enišasi, during the Amarna letters period of 1350–1335 BC. In the entire correspondence of 382–letters, his name is only referenced in his own letter to the Ancient Egyptian pharaoh, EA 187, (EA for 'el Amarna'). Šatiya's city/city-state of Enišasi is only referenced in one other letter, authored by another mayor of Enišasi, Abdi-Riša.

== Šatiya's letter no. 187 ==
Šatiya's single letter to pharaoh, is a moderately short letter, entitled: "A daughter sent to the Pharaoh". As 5 lines of the body of the letter are missing, (a lacuna), the main subject is lost, except for the final sentence concerning Šatiya's daughter.

=== The letter, title: "A daughter sent to the Pharaoh" ===
Sa[y to the kin]g, my lord, [my god, my Sun: Mess]age of Šatiya, the ruler of [ Enišasi ], your [ser]vant, the dirt und[er the f]eet of the king, my lord. I [fa]ll [a]t the feet of the king, [my] lord, my god, my Sun, 7 times and 7 times.
As I am the loya[l] servant of the king, my lord, my god, [my Sun], in this place, and Enišasi is a city of the king, my lord, [my] god, my [Sun], I am guarding [the pl]ace of the king, [m]y lo[rd, my god, my Sun, where I am]. ...
...
...And I herew[ith s]end my daughter to the [pa]lace, [t]o the king, my lord, m[y] god, my Sun. —EA 187, lines 1-22 (16-21 lost-lacuna)

== See also ==
- Abdi-Riša, mayor of Enišasi
- Enišasi
- Amarna letters–localities and their rulers
