= Kamid el-Loz =

Human settlement in Beqaa Governorate, Lebanon

Kamed Al Lawz/Kamid el-Loz كامد اللوز
- City
- Interactive map of Kamed Al Lawz/Kamid el-Loz
- Country: Lebanon
- Governorate: Beqaa Governorate
- District: Western Beqaa District

Population
  - Total: 6,000
- Time zone: UTC+2 (EET)
  - Summer (DST): UTC+3 (EEST)
- Dialing code: +961

Kamid el-Loz
- Kamid al lawz
- Location within Lebanon
- 33°37′06″N 35°49′07″E
- Type: Tell
- Periods: Neolithic, Chalcolithic, Byzantine, Bronze Age
- Cultures: Hellenistic, Roman, Canaanite, Aramean, Amorite
- Location: Beqaa Valley, Lebanon
- Part of: Settlement

Site notes
- Condition: ruins
- Public access: Yes

Kamid el-Loz (Arabic: كامد اللوز, romanized: Kāmid al-Lawz) is located in the western Beqaa Valley of Lebanon. The settlement has a population numbering several thousand people, mostly Sunni Muslims, and is also a site of archaeological excavations.

== History ==
In 1838, Eli Smith noted Kamid el-Lauz as a Sunni Muslim village in the Beqaa Valley. The ancient name of the site is thought to be Kumidi.

== Archaeology ==
Kamid el-Loz was the site of major German archaeological excavations between 1963 and 1981. One of the most important sites in Lebanon where archaeologists found and recorded many spectacular buildings, which are very important to the history of the region. Paleolithic material was found alongside Heavy Neolithic on through to the late Neolithic period, becoming a human settlement during the Bronze Age and continuing until the Byzantine era, a German team from the University of Freiburg has conducted more recent excavations and studies.

=== Cuneiform tablets ===
Probably the most important finds were documents written in cuneiform script on clay tablets dated to the 14th century BC. The village of Kamed el-Loz lies on top of settlements built in the Achaemenid, Hellenistic and Roman periods. The site has been determined to be the city of Kumidi in the Amarna letters. It was used as a residence for Egyptian officials to oversee the southern Levantine kings on behalf of the pharaoh.

South of the village we find a necropolis or burial place that also dates to this era. Just outside Kamed El-Loz is a large Umayyad quarry visible from the road. Rock-cut tombs can be seen here, as well as Aramaic inscriptions. The quarry provided stones for the eighth-century city of Anjar and was worked by Eastern Christians from Iraq who were brought to the Beqaa for this purpose.

The archaeological site of Kamid Loz I is located 2 kilometres (1.2 mi) north-east of the village of Kamid el-Loz and 4.5 kilometres (2.8 mi) north-northeast of Joub Jannine. The site showed a direct transition from Paleolithic material which was mixed with flints from an aceramic, vigorous culture, little recorded in the archaeological record called the Qaraoun culture inhabiting the area at the start of the Neolithic Revolution. Heavy Neolithic flints from this culture collected here included scrapers, picks and axes along with a large amount of debris.

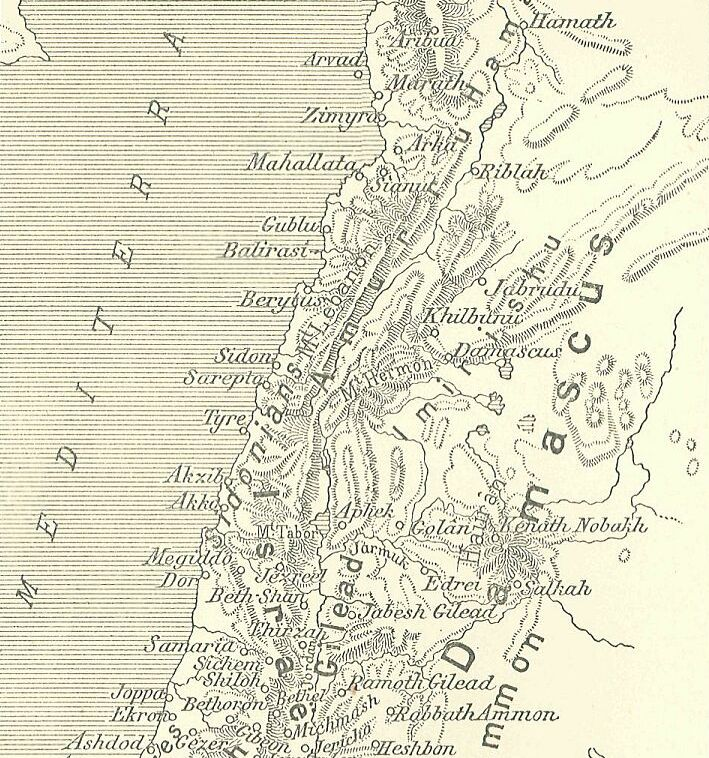
Map of the region

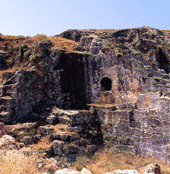
Ruins of Kamid el-Loz

== See also ==
- List of cities of the ancient Near East

== Bibliography ==
- Robinson, E.; Smith, E. (1841). Biblical Researches in Palestine, Mount Sinai and Arabia Petraea: A Journal of Travels in the year 1838. Vol. 3. Boston: Crocker & Brewster.
