= Beqaa Valley =

Valley in eastern Lebanon

Coordinates: 34°00′32″N 36°08′43″E

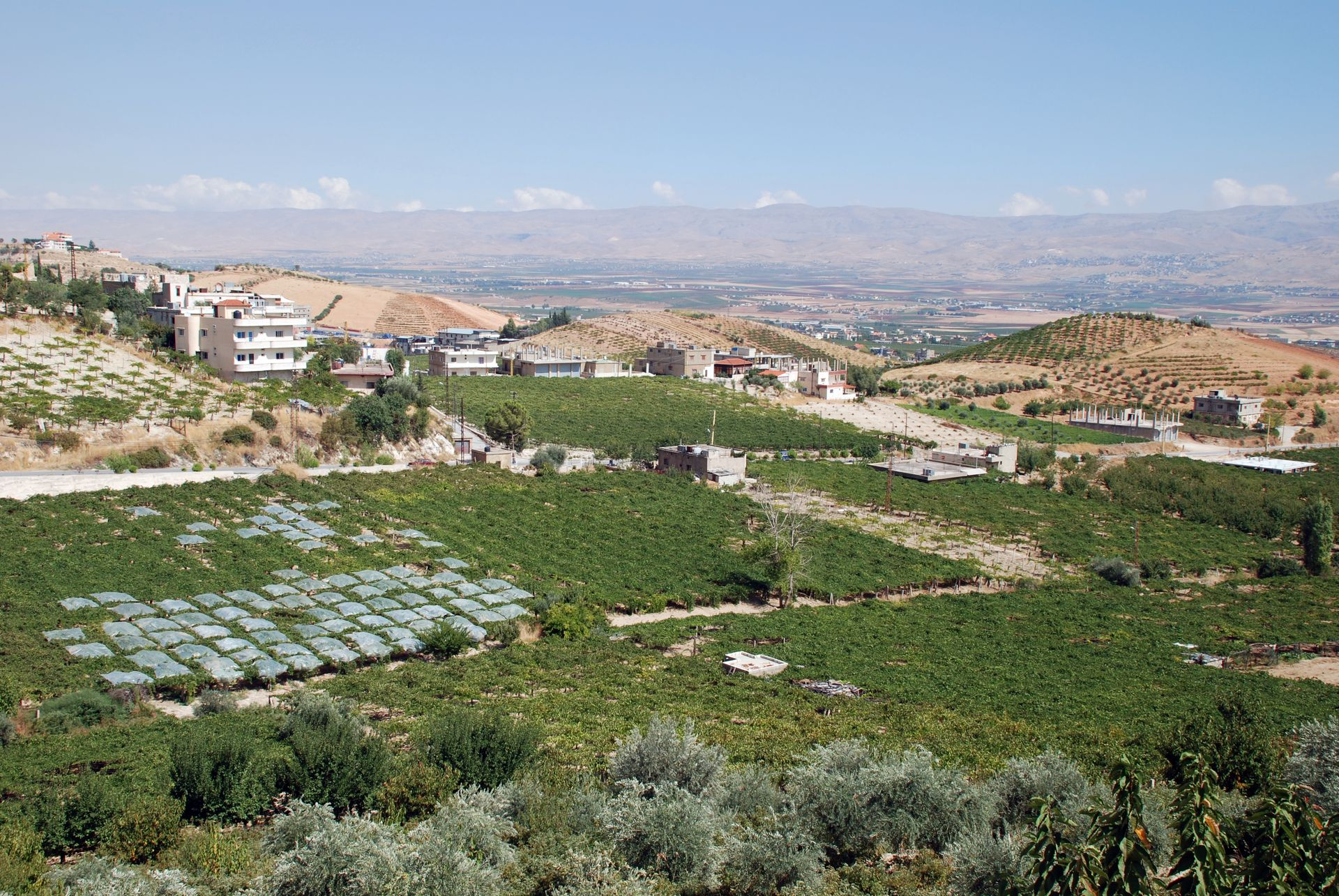
- Grapevines near Kasarnaba, overlooking the central Beqaa Valley

- Location within Lebanon
- Length: 120 km (75 mi)
- Width: 16 km (9.9 mi)

Naming
- Native name: وادي البقاع (Arabic)

Geology
- Type: Valley

Geography
- Country: Lebanon
- State/Province: Baalbek-Hermel Governorate, Beqaa Governorate
- Population center: Baalbek
- Interactive map of Beqaa Valley

The Beqaa Valley (Arabic: وادي البقاع, romanized: Wādī al-Biqāʿ, Lebanese Arabic: [bʔaːʕ]; also romanized as Bekaa, Bekai, Biqâ, and Becaa) is a fertile valley in eastern Lebanon and its most important farming region. Industry, especially the country's agricultural industry, also flourishes in Beqaa. The region broadly corresponds to the Coele-Syria of classical antiquity.

The Beqaa is located about 30 km (19 mi) east of Beirut. The valley is situated between Mount Lebanon to the west and the Anti-Lebanon Mountains to the east. It is the northern continuation of the Jordan Rift Valley, and thus part of the Great Rift Valley, which stretches from Syria to the Red Sea and then on to southeast Africa. Beqaa Valley is 120 kilometres (75 mi) long and 16 kilometres (9.9 mi) wide on average. It has a Mediterranean climate of wet, often snowy winters and dry, warm summers.

== History ==
=== Pre-history ===
In Baalbek, that is part of a valley to the east of the northern Beqaa Valley, there are evidence of continual habitation dating back almost 8000–9000 years. Ard Tlaili is a small tell mound with an archaeological site, located on a plain at the foot of the Lebanon Mountain, just 11 km (7 mi) northwest of Baalbeck, in the Beqaa Valley. It dates to around 5780-5710 BC and has the southernmost pottery belonging to the Halaf Culture.

Labweh is a village at an elevation of 950 metres (3,120 ft) on a foothill of the Anti-Lebanon Mountains in Baalbek District, Baalbek-Hermel Governorate, Lebanon, settled since the Neolithic period.

=== Bronze Age ===
In the Middle Bronze IIA, the Beqa Valley was a highway between the regional power of Qatna in the north and its vassal Hazor in the south. The Beqaa valley was known as Amqu during the Bronze Age. The identity of the inhabitants is not known for certain, but the region was part of the Amorite Kingdoms of Amurru and Qatna. To the southwest of Baalbek was Enišasi, a city or city-state mentioned in the 1350-1335 BC Amarna letters correspondence, written by two rulers of the city Šatiya and Abdi-Riša.

=== Iron Age ===
By the early Iron Age, the Beqaa Valley came to be dominated by Phoenician-and Aramaic-speaking populations.

In the 11th and 10th centuries BC, the Aramaeans founded the kingdom of Aram-Zobah (also Sobah), mentioned in the Bible. Many scholars suggest it was located in the Beqa'a valley. The precise whereabouts of Zobah, a prominent city at the time, remains a subject of scholarly debate. In the 8th and 7th centuries BC, Sobah, now under Imperial Assyrian rule, served as the residence for an Assyrian governor, Bel-liqbi.

According to a surface survey study by German archaeologist L. Marfoe, the northern Beqaa, and thus the Beqaa valley as a whole, was only sparsely inhabited during the Achaemenid period.

=== Hellenistic and Roman times ===
By the time of Alexander the Great, the valley was reportedly inhabited by the Itureans, possibly an Arabic or Aramaean people. According to the Histories of Alexander the Great, the Itureans were Arab peasants living in the hills above Tyre who slaughtered about 30 Macedonians, which prompted Alexander to conduct an expedition against them. Later on, the Itureans broke away from the weakened Seleucid Empire to form the Kingdom of Chalcis. From their base in the Bekaa, the Itureans expanded their territory to include the Phoenician cities of the coast and came close to Damascus. Their territory was eventually absorbed into the rest of Roman Syria.

The valley was of considerable importance to the Roman Empire as one of the important agricultural regions in the eastern provinces, and it was known for its many temples. The region also gained the attention of Palmyrene Queen Zenobia, who built the Canalizations of Zenobia, linking the valley with Palmyra.

== Geography ==
=== Districts and towns ===
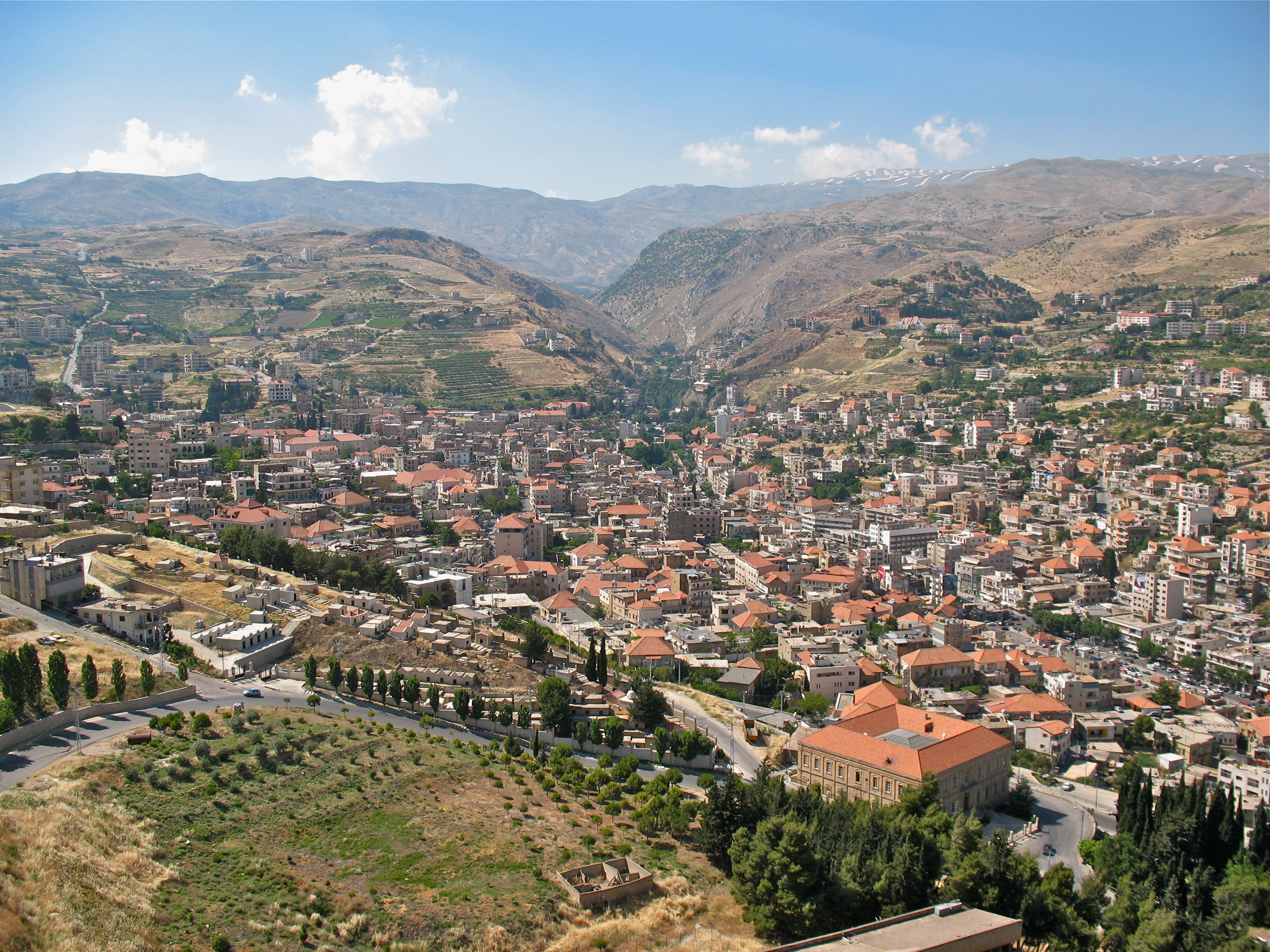
Zahlé, the capital of the Beqaa Governorate

Zahle is the largest city and the administrative capital of the Beqaa Governorate. It lies just north of the main Beirut–Damascus highway, which bisects the valley. The majority of Zahle's residents are Lebanese Christians, the majority being Melkite Greek Catholic, Maronite Catholic, and Greek Orthodox Christians. The town of Anjar, situated in the eastern part of the valley, has a predominantly Armenian Lebanese population and is famous for its 8th-century Umayyad Arab ruins. Further east, the town of Majdal Anjar has a Sunni Muslim majority.

The majority of the inhabitants of the northern districts of Beqaa, Baalbek and Hermel, are Lebanese Shiites, with the exception of the town of Deir el Ahmar, whose inhabitants are Christians. The Baalbek and Hermel districts have a Christian and Sunni minority, mainly situated further north along the border with Syria.

The western and southern districts of the valley also have a mixed population of Muslims, Christians, and Druze. The town of Joub Janine with a population of about 12,000, is situated midway in the valley, and its population is Sunni. Joub Janine is the governmental center of the region known as Western Beqaa, with municipal services like the serail, which is the main government building in the area, emergency medical services (Red Cross), a fire department, and a courthouse.

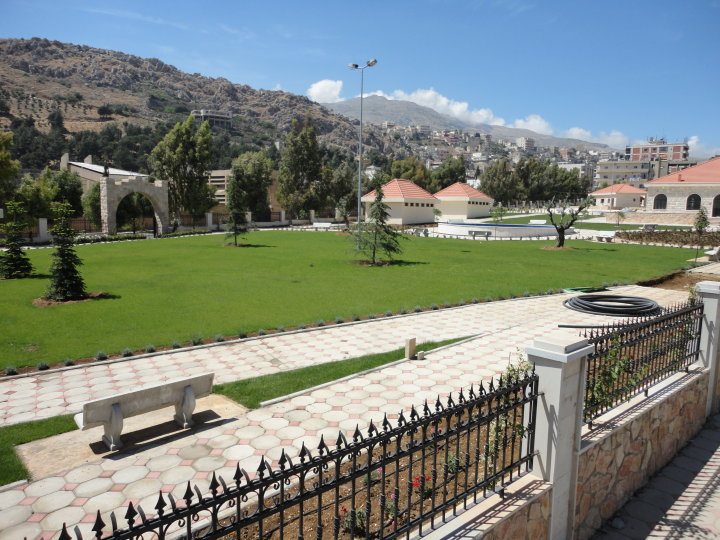
Municipal garden of Qabb Ilyas

Other towns in the Western Beqaa district are Machghara, Sabghine, Kamed al Lawz, Qab Elias, Sohmor, Yohmor. The towns are all a mix of different Lebanese religious confessions. Rachaiya al Wadi, east of the Western Beqaa district, is home to Lebanon's share of Mount Hermon and borders Syria also. The district's capital, also Rachaiya al Wadi, not to be confused with Rachaiya al Foukhar in South Lebanon, is famous for its old renovated souk and what is known as the castle of independence in which Lebanon's pre-independence leaders were held by French troops before being released in 1943. The southern section of the district is inhabited with Druze and Christian Lebanese, while the other northern section is mainly inhabited by Sunni Lebanese.

Due to wars and the unstable economic and political conditions Lebanon faced in the past, with difficulties some farmers still face today, many previous inhabitants of the valley left for coastal cities in Lebanon or emigrated from the country altogether, with the majority residing in North America, South America or Australia.

=== Climate ===
The region receives limited rainfall, particularly in the north, because Mount Lebanon creates a rain shadow that blocks precipitation coming from the sea. The northern section has an average annual rainfall of 230 millimetres (9.1 in), compared to 750 millimetres (30 in) in the central valley. Nevertheless, two rivers originate in the valley: the Orontes (Asi), which flows north into Syria and Turkey, and the Litani, which flows south and then west to the Mediterranean Sea.

From the 1st century BC, when the region was part of the Roman Empire, the Beqaa Valley served as a source of grain for the Roman provinces of the Levant. Today the valley makes up 40 percent of Lebanon's arable land. The northern end of the valley, with its scarce rainfall and less fertile soils, is used primarily as grazing land by pastoral nomads. Farther south, more fertile soils support crops of wheat, maize, cotton, and vegetables, with vineyards and orchards centered on Zahlé.

The valley also produces hashish and cultivates opium poppies, which are exported as part of the illegal drug trade.

== Landmarks ==
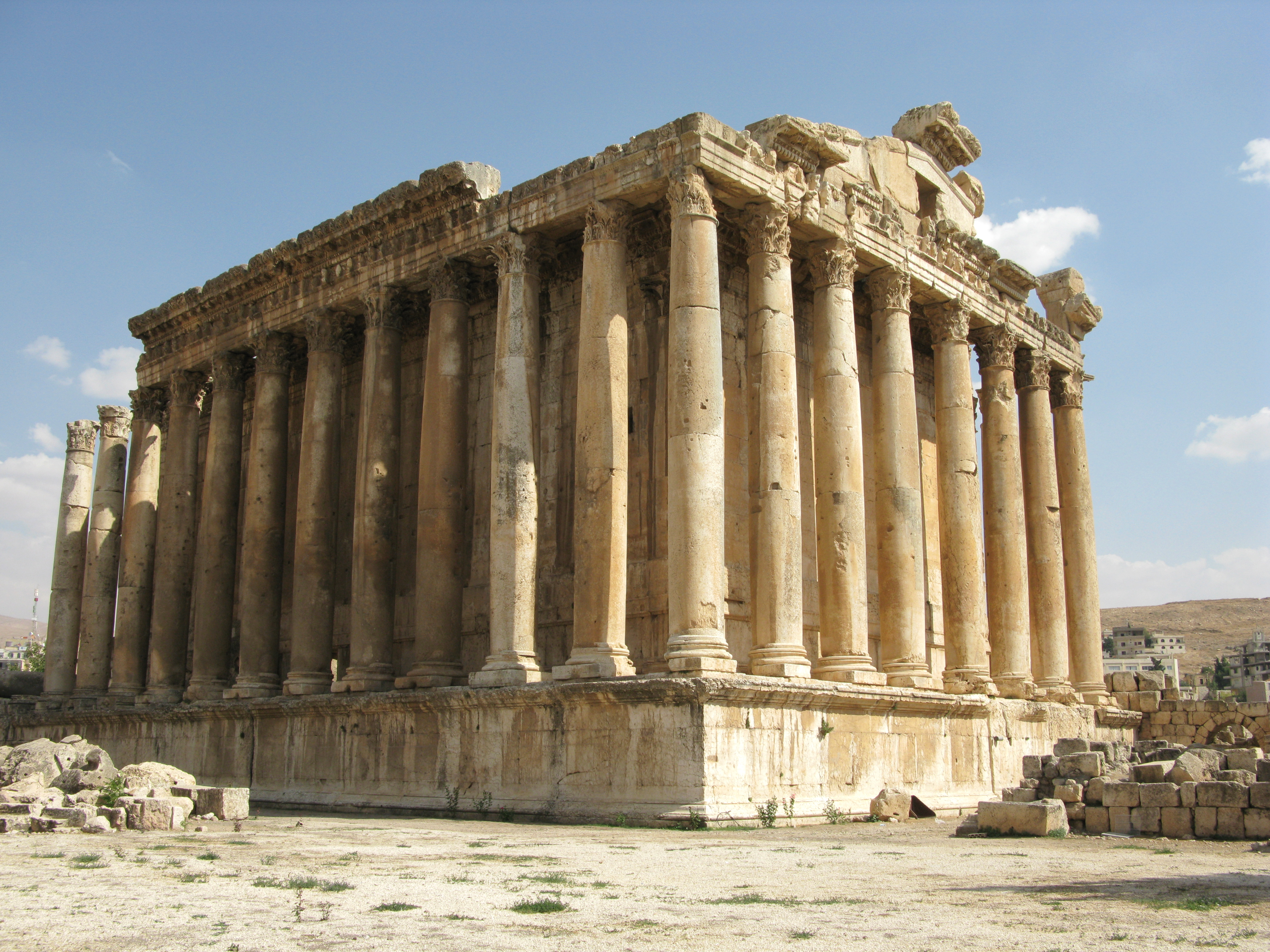
The Temple of Bacchus in Baalbek

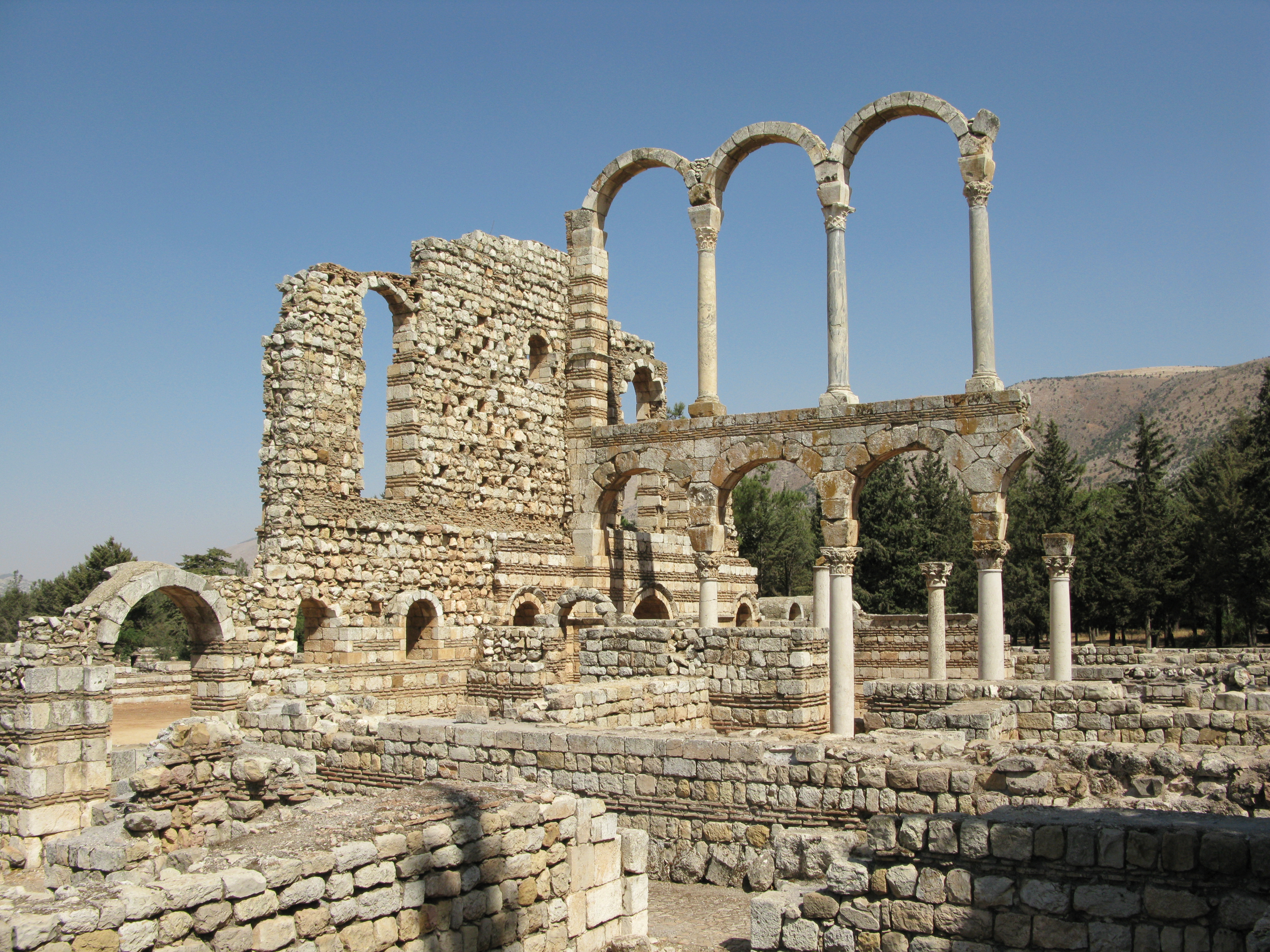
The Umayyad city ruins in Anjar

- The ancient Roman ruins of Baalbek
- Temples of the Beqaa Valley, a collection of shrines and Roman temples
- Tomb of Khawla, alleged shrine of Khawla the daughter of Husayn ibn Ali
- The Umayyad ruins of Anjar
- Our Lady of Bekaa, a Marian shrine
- The Aammiq Wetland habitat for birds and butterflies
- The Roman Grotto under Château Ksara winery
- Lebanon's tallest minaret, in Kherbet Rouha
- The Sanctuary of Our Lady of Bechouat
- Roman nymphaeum of Temnin el-Foka
- Lake Qaraoun, the largest artificial water reservoir in Lebanon
- Phoenician ruins of Kamid al lawz
- Roman ruins of Libbaya
- Roman ruins of Qab Elias
- The Pyramid tower of Hermel at the northern end of the valley
- Tomb of Noah in Karak Nuh, a shrine dedicated to Noah.
- Majdal Anjar Temple
- Umayyad mosque of Baalbek

== Wines ==
The Beqaa Valley, often referred to as the Bekaa Valley in the wine industry, particularly the expansive agricultural regions in its eastern areas, accounts the majority of Lebanon's renowned wine production. Wine making is a tradition that goes back 6000 years in Lebanon. With an average altitude of 1000 m above sea level, the valley's climate is very suitable to vineyards. Abundant winter rain and much sunshine in the summer helps the grapes ripen easily. There are more than a dozen wineries in the Beqaa Valley, producing over six million bottles a year. Beqaa Valley wineries include:

- Château Ka
- Château Kefraya
- Château Khoury
- Château Ksara
- Château Marsyas
- Château Musar
- Château Qanafar
- Clos Saint Thomas
- Domaine de Baal
- Domaine des Tourelles
- Domaine Wardy
- Kroum Kefraya
- Massaya
- Terre Joie

== Illicit drugs ==
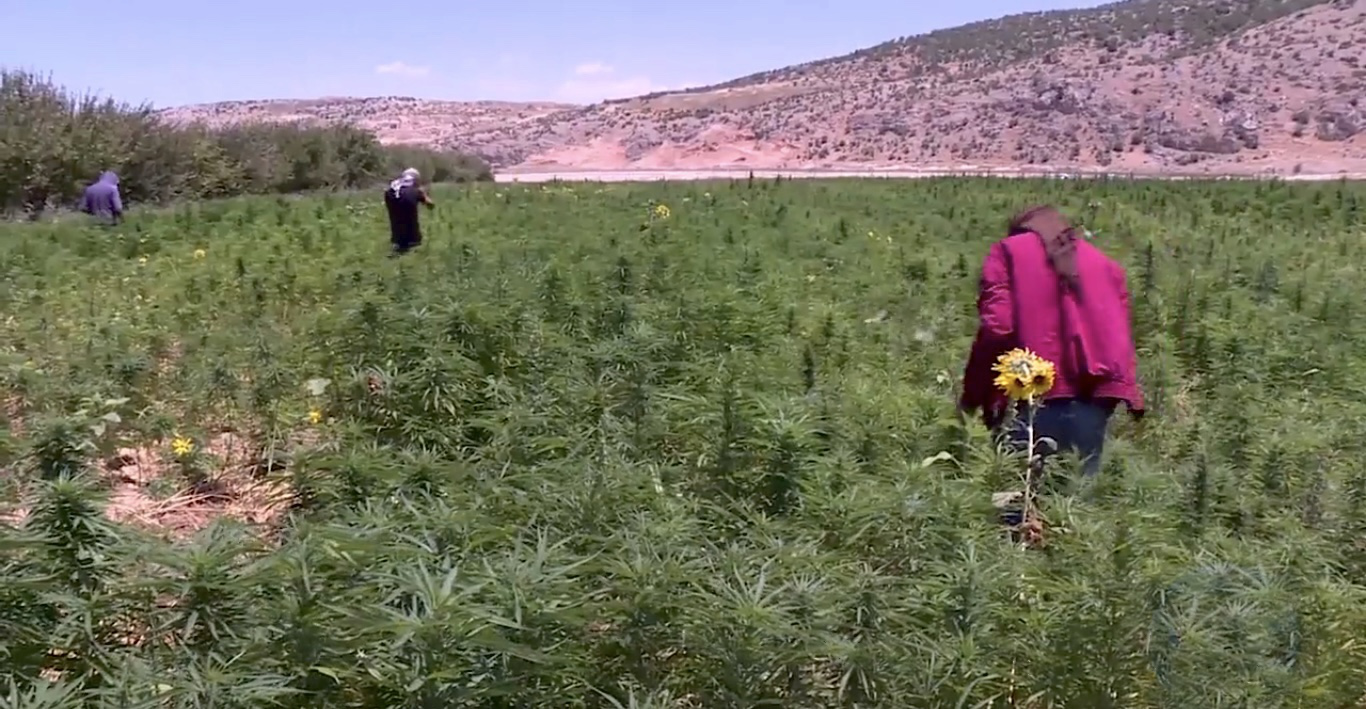
Farmers harvesting cannabis in the Bekaa Valley, 2021

Drugs have a long tradition in the Beqaa Valley, from the days of the Roman Empire to the present. Cultivators and tribal drug lords have worked with militias to build up a thriving cannabis trade. The region has been compared to Peru's cocaine producing Upper Huallaga Valley.

During the Lebanese Civil War, cannabis cultivation was a major source of income in the Beqaa Valley, where most of the country's hashish and opium was produced. The war led various groups to turn to drug trafficking for income. Syria, which controlled most of the Valley, profited significantly from the trade. Palestinian militant groups, including the PLO, also participated in the hashish trade, making millions of dollars.

The trade collapsed during the worldwide crackdown on narcotics led by the United States in the early 1990s. Under pressure from the U.S. State Department, the occupying Syrian Army plowed up the Beqaa's cannabis fields and sprayed them with poison. Prior to 1991 it was estimated that income generated from illicit crops grown in the Beqaa was around $500 million. According to the UNDP the annual per capita income at that time in the Baalbek and Hermel district did not exceed $500. The same agency estimated the figure for the rest of Lebanon was $2,074.

Since the mid-1990s, the culture and production of drugs in the Beqaa Valley has been in steady decline. By 2002, an estimated 2,500 hectares of cannabis were limited to the extreme north of the Valley, where government presence remains minimal. Every year since 2001 the Lebanese Army plows cannabis fields in an effort to destroy the crops before harvest. It is estimated that that action eliminates no more than 30% of overall crops. Although important during the civil war, opium cultivation has become marginal, dropping from an estimated 30 metric tonnes per year in 1983 to negligible amounts in 2004.

Due to increasing political unrest that weakened the central Lebanese government during the 2006 Lebanon War and 2007 Opposition boycott of the government, and due to the lack of viable alternatives, UN promises of irrigation projects and alternative crop subsidies that never materialized, drug cultivation and production have significantly increased. They remain a fraction of the civil war era production and are limited north of the town of Baalbek, where the rule of tribal law protecting armed families is still strong.

== Gallery ==
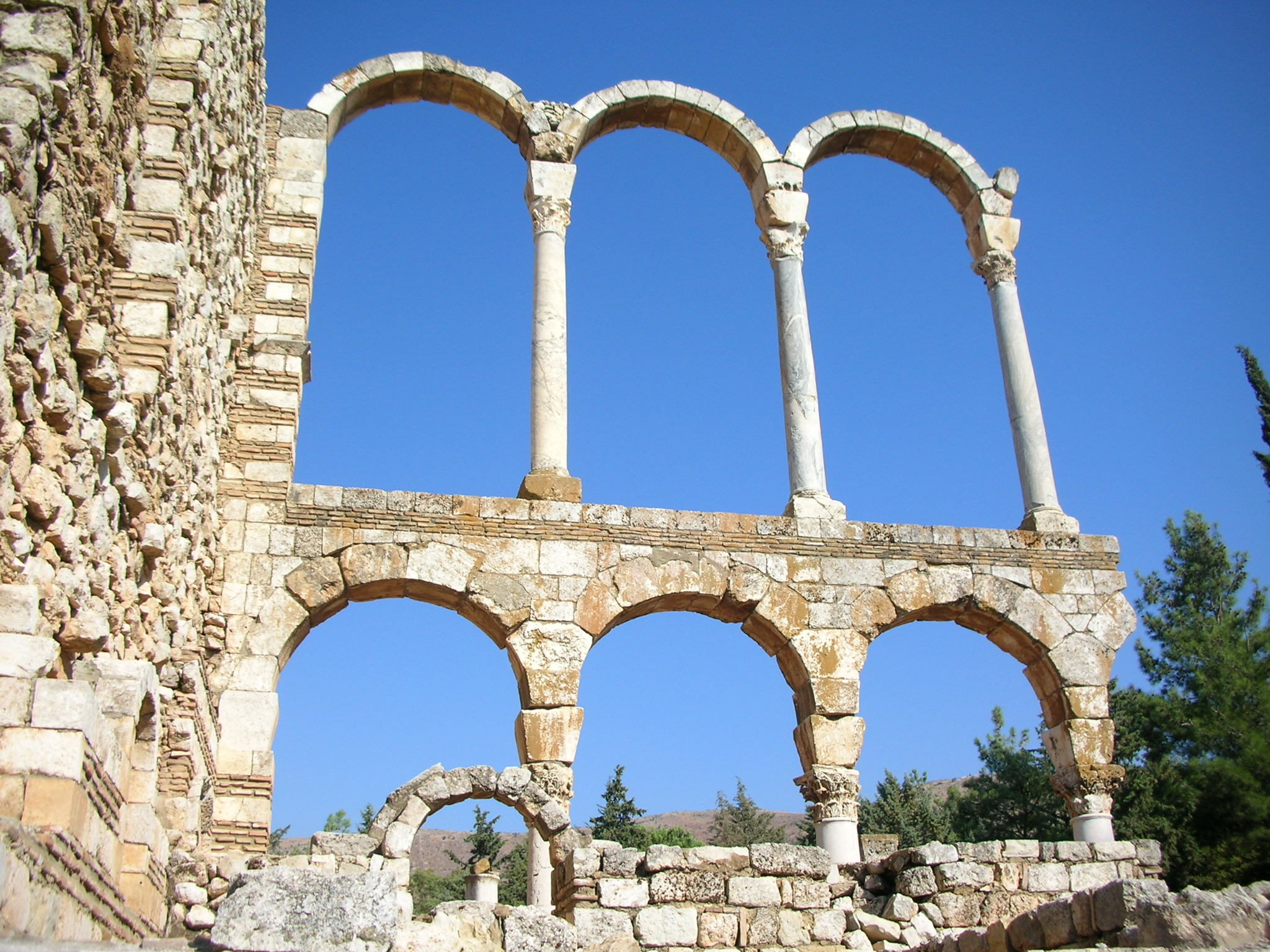
Arches at the ruins of Anjar

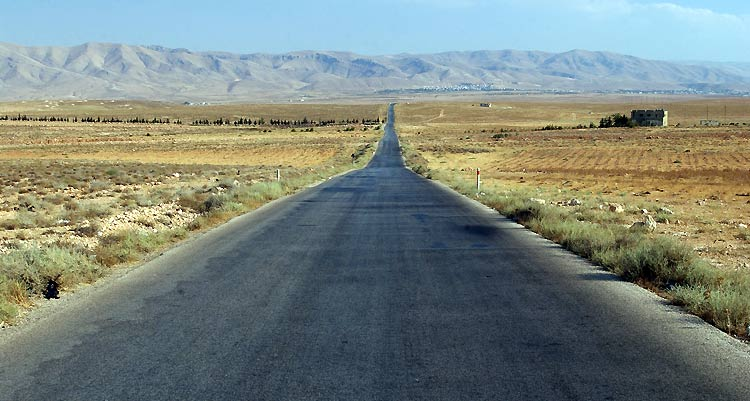
Road in the Bekaa

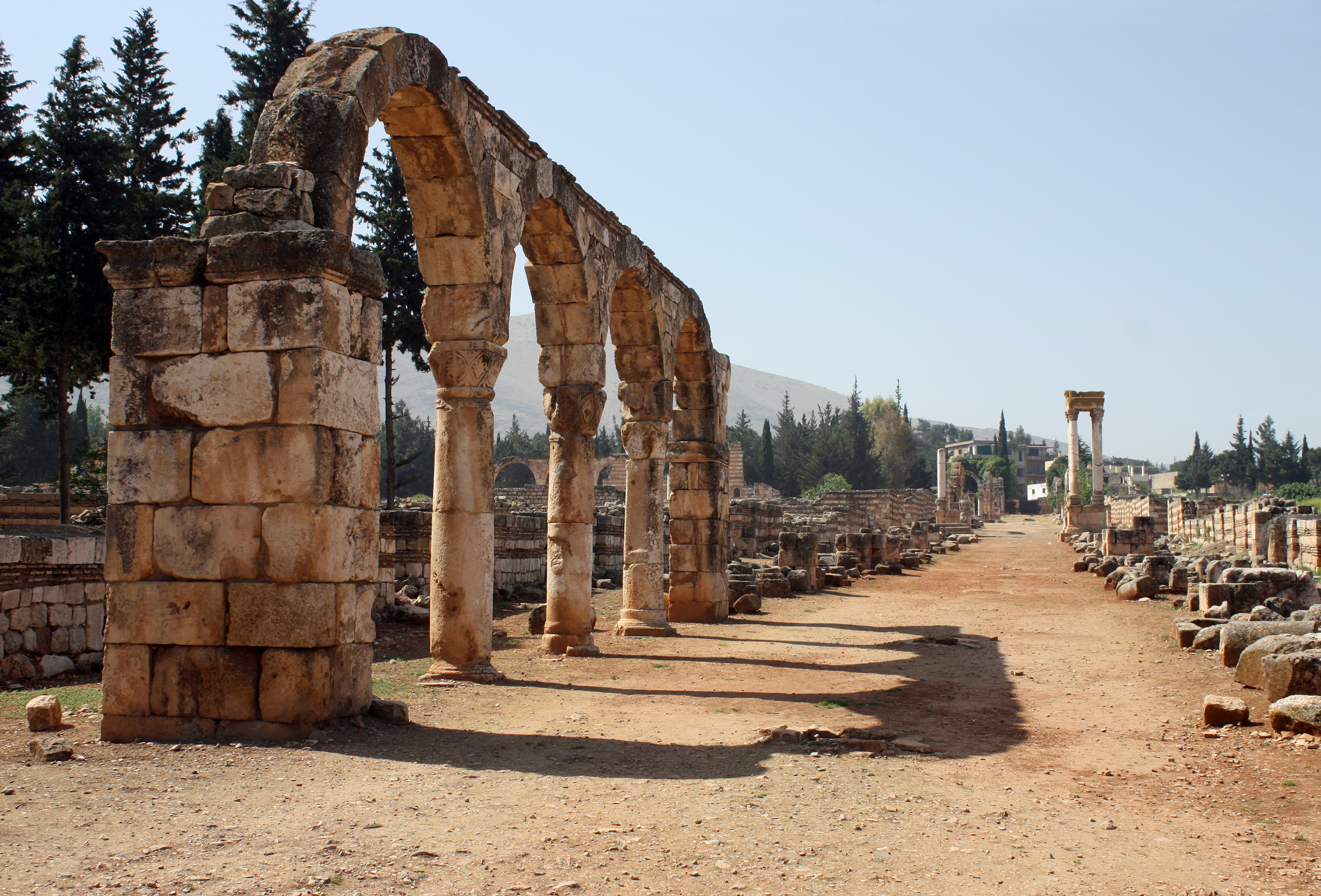
Remains of structures

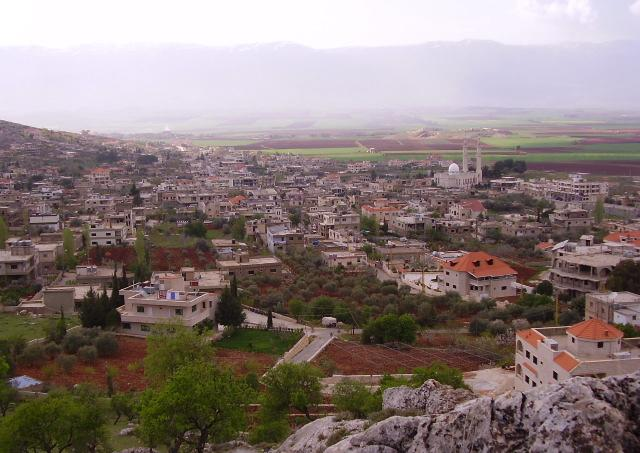
Kamid el-Loz village

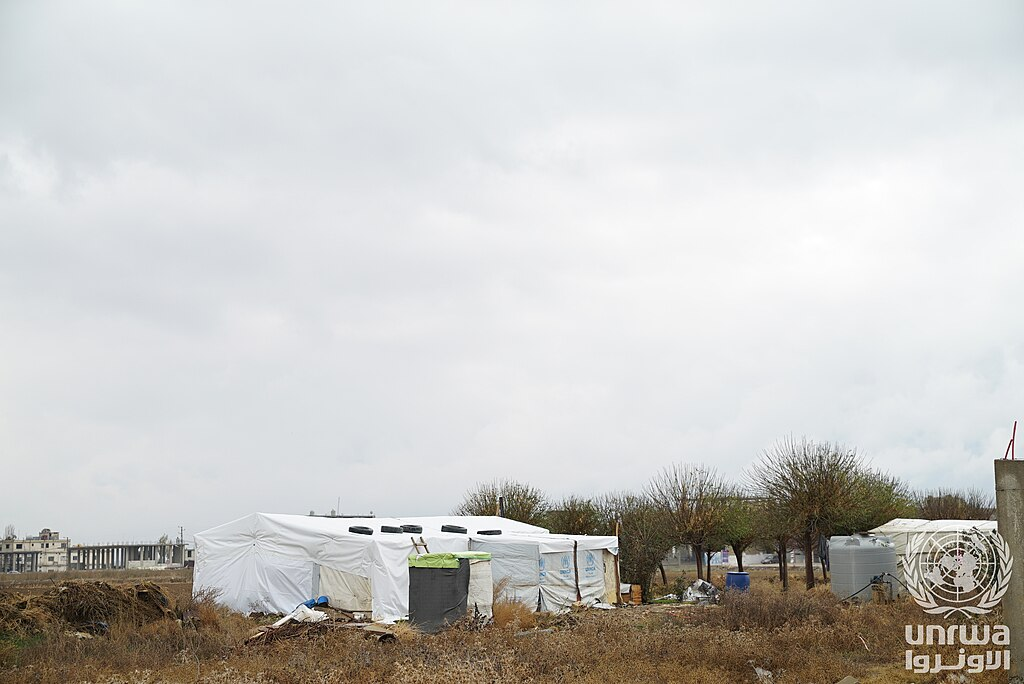
Palestine refugee families from Syria in Beqaa Valley

== See also ==
- Sheikh Adi ibn Musafir
