= Tob =

Name of a biblical place in ancient Israel

Tob was the name of a place in Transjordan, mentioned in the Hebrew Bible.

== Hebrew Bible ==
Jephthah flees from his brothers to the "land of Tob". In Tob, Jephtha gatheres some men until his brothers want him back to fight against the Ammonites (Judges 11:3–11). The place may be the same as the one mentioned in 2 Samuel 10:6–8, named Ishtob (cf. Hebrew ish Tov). Some believe it should be translated "men of Tob", rather than "Ishtob".

== Identification ==
There is a place named as Ṭby or Ṭubu in second millennium BCE sources, mentioned among the cities in Bashan. This led Benjamin Mazar and Martin Noth to identify it with the region near "Taiyibeh", to the east of biblical Edrei (today's Daraa in southern Syria), where today there is a Syrian village by this name (coordinates: 32°33'45 N, 36°14'38 E). Conder gave for his choice of Tob/Taibeh the coordinates "32° 35' N., 35° 42' E.", a place described in Brown–Driver–Briggs as 12 miles southeast of the Sea of Galilee, corresponding to modern-day Taibah near Irbid in northern Jordan.

It has been suggested that the "land of Tob" was back country, used by outlaws as a place of refuge.

== Amarna letters ==
Tob is also a town referred to in the Amarna letters, circa 1350 BCE. Among the c. 382 letters (EA 1 through EA 382) there is only one mention of the town, by the name TuBu, and in this small group of letters, the leader of the town of Tubu is only referred to as the "Man" of the town, i.e. "the mayor" or "governor". Man was one of many common designations. He would have been a prince-type local leader - the chief of a tribe, clan, city, region, etc. EA letter 205 is the letter from the "Man of Tubu" and is one of 6 letters written by the same scribe.

== See also ==
- Umm el-Marra
