= Tubu (town) =

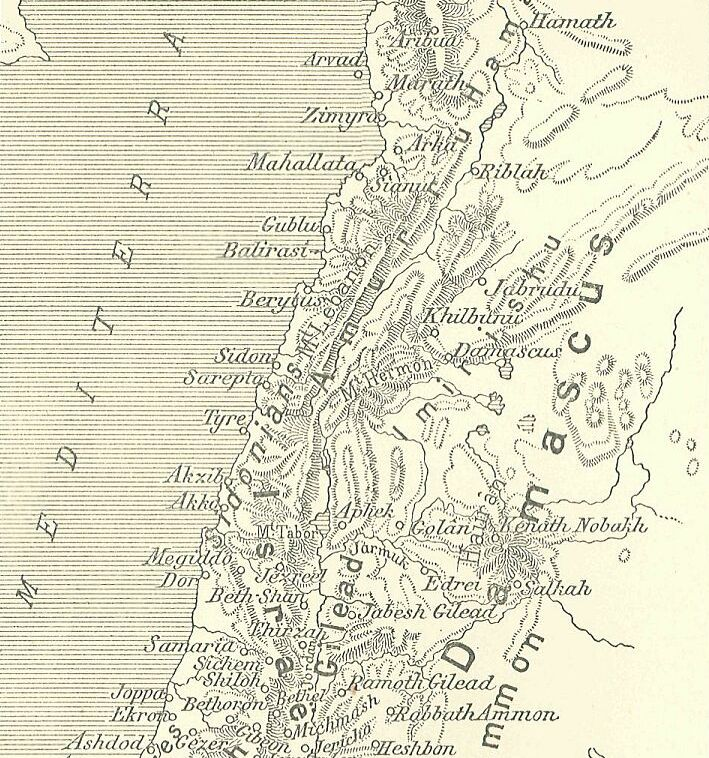

Tubu is the town east of the Sea of Galilee referred to in the (body) of the Amarna letters.

Tubu is the probable biblical town of Tob. In the entire group of El Amarna letters, EA 205 is the only usage of the name Tubu, and only the "Man" (or Mayor/prince) is referenced.

The scribe who wrote EA 205, visited and /or wrote from six towns, five south of or neighboring, Damascus. Three were named, as only from the "Man" of the town. Three were designated by the "Leader" of the town, and one of the six towns, was not mentioned by name. These Amarna letters are all written from the time centering about 1350 BCE and written in Akkadian cuneiform on clay tablets.

== See also ==
- Umm el-Marra

== Sources ==
- Index, Introduction, Maps, etc. in ...The Amarna Letters, Ed. and translated by William Moran, French, and English, c. 1987, 1992.
