= Qanawat =

Qanawat قَنَوَات Kanatha, Canatha
- Village
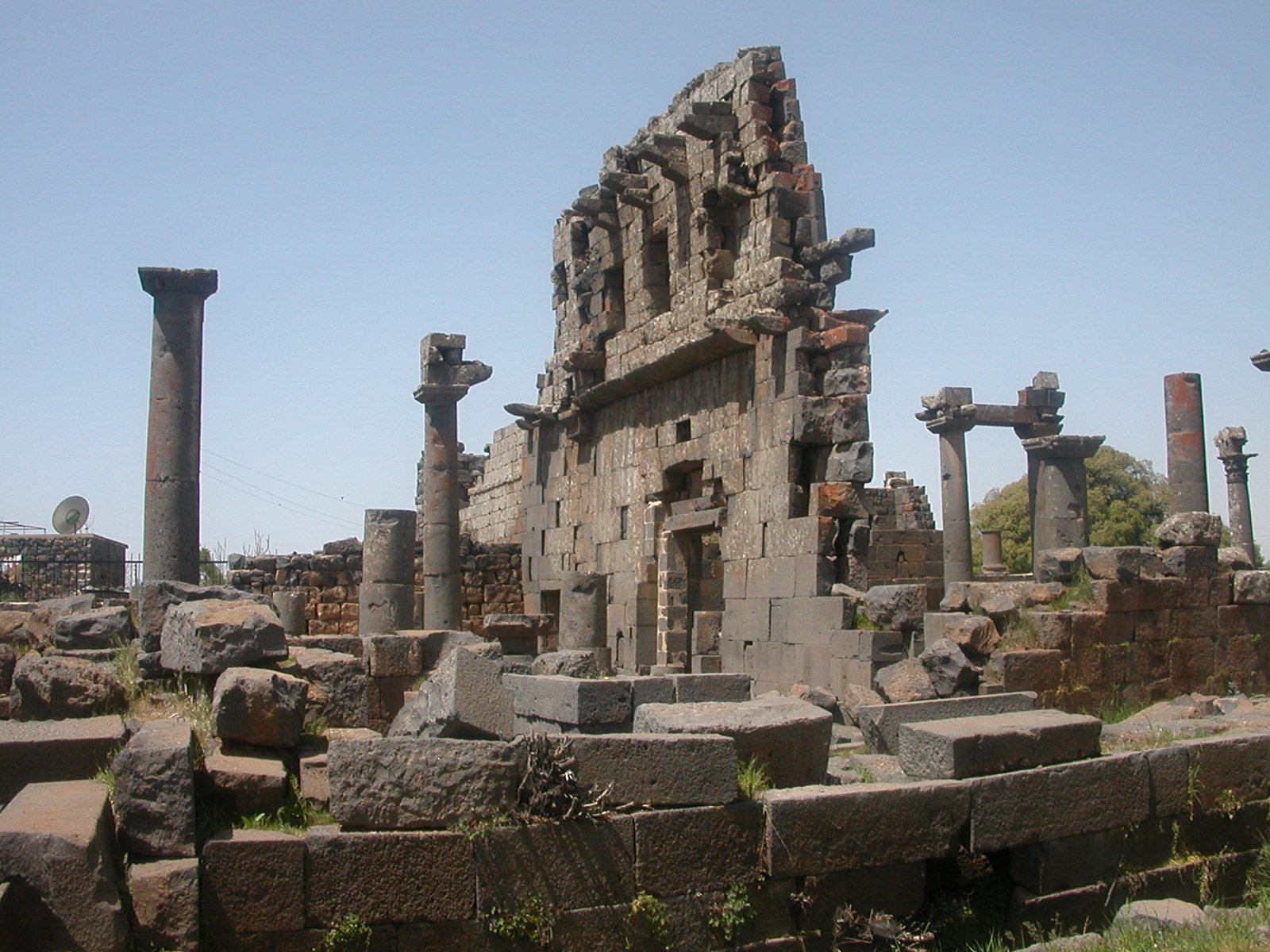

- Location in Syria
- Coordinates: 32°45′20″N 36°37′00″E
- Grid position: 301/240
- Country: Syria
- Governorate: Suwayda
- District: Suwayda
- Subdistrict: Suwayda
- Elevation: 1,200 m (3,900 ft)

Population (2004 census)
  - Total: 8,324
- Time zone: UTC+2 (EET)
  - Summer (DST): +3

Qanawat (Arabic: قَنَوَات, romanized: Qanawāt) is a village in Syria, located 7 km north-east of Suwayda in the Jabal al-Druze region. It stands at an elevation of about 1,200 m, near a river and surrounded by woods. According to the Syria Central Bureau of Statistics (CBS), Qanawat had a population of 8,324 in the 2004 census. Its inhabitants are predominantly from the Druze community, with a Sunni Muslim Bedouin minority.

== History ==
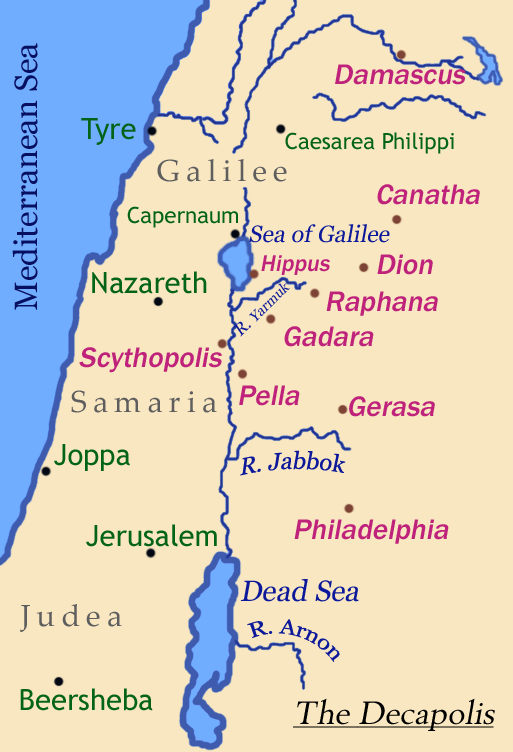
Map of the Decapolis showing the location of Canatha (Qanawat)

Qanawat is one of the earliest cities in the Bashan and Hauran areas. It is probably evidenced in the Hebrew Bible as Kenath (Hebrew: קְנָת, Numbers 32:42, 1 Chronicles 2:23). Possible earlier evidence, is from Ancient Egyptian documents like the execration texts (second group) of the 20th-19th century BC, and the Amarna letters of the 14th century BC (as Qanu, in EA 204).

=== Hellenistic and Roman history ===
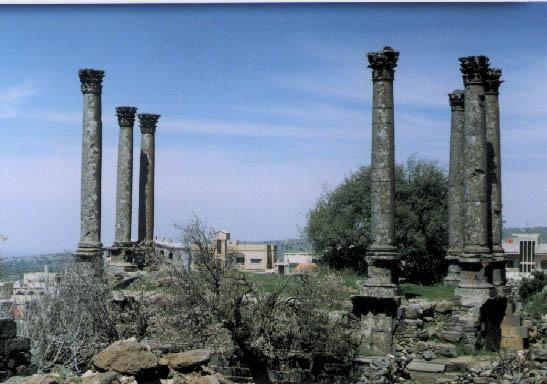
Temple of Rabbos

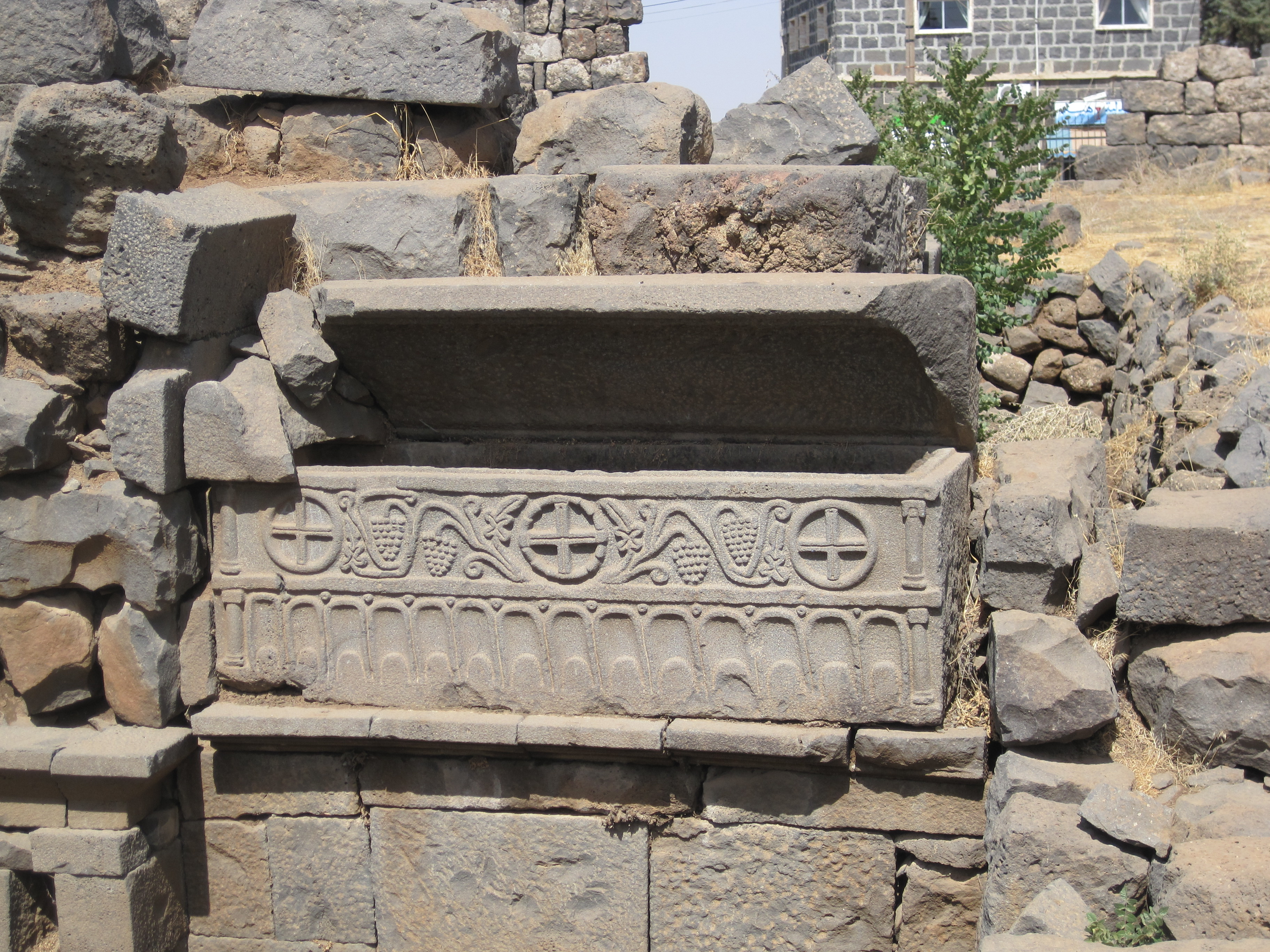
Sarcophagus in 4th/5th century church

The ancient Hellenistic-Roman city of Canatha (also Kanatha, Κάναθα in Ancient Greek), is mentioned for the first time in the reign of Herod the Great (1st century BC), when Nabatean Arab forces defeated a Jewish army. It remained an issue of contention between the two powers. From Pompey's time until Trajan's, it was a city of the Decapolis, a loose federation of cities allowed by the Romans to enjoy a degree of autonomy. In the 1st century AD it was annexed to the Roman province of Syria, and in the 2nd century it was rechristened Septimia Canatha by Septimius Severus, a Roman colony, and transferred to the province of Arabia.

At S'ia, near Canatha, Herod patronized the temple of Ba'al Shamim perhaps as late as 9 BCE.

=== Bishopric ===
Only one of the bishops of Canatha is known by name: Theodosius took part in the Second Council of Ephesus in 449, in the Council of Chalcedon in 451, and in a synod called by Gennadius of Constantinople in 459 against simony.

No longer a residential bishopric, Canatha is today listed by the Catholic Church as a titular see.

=== Early Islamic era ===
A center of Christianity in the area, Canatha was captured by the Muslim Arabs in 637, and declined in importance until in the 9th century it was reduced to a poor village.

=== Ottoman era ===
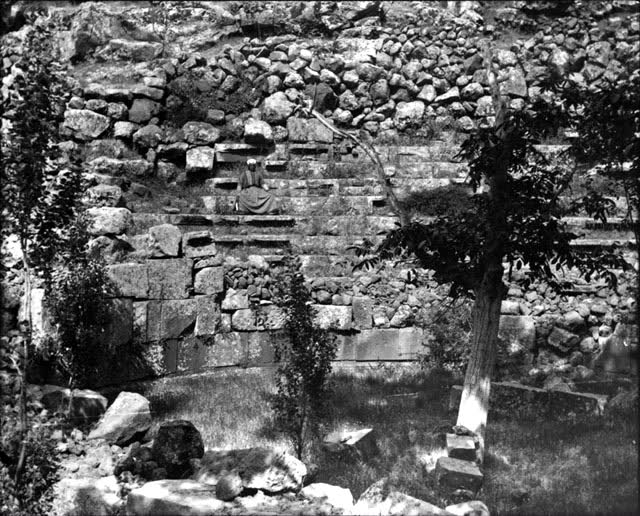
Qanawat in 1900, from the Gertrude Bell Archive

In 1596 Qanawat appeared in the Ottoman tax registers as part of the nahiya (subdistrict) of Bani Nasiyya of the Hauran Sanjak. It had a population of twelve Muslim and five Christian households. Among the inhabitants were a group of settled Bedouin. The villagers paid a fixed tax rate of 20% on various agricultural products, including wheat, barley, summer crops, goats and/or beehives; a total of 4,750 akçe. Qanawat was abandoned between the 17th and 18th centuries. However, by the 1820s, it was among the first villages in the Jabal Hauran to be repopulated by Druze migrants from Mount Lebanon. At the time, five or six Druze families settled the village. Because of its Roman past, Qanawat already had paved pathways, readily available empty houses and water sources. However, its population had only incrementally increased between 1830 and 1850. Though during that period it became the home of Druze religious sheikhs, it was not until the 1850s that was Qanawat established as the seat of the preeminent shaykh al-aql (Druze religious leader) and the center of local Druze politics. Following further Druze migration to the area after the 1860 Mount Lebanon civil war, Qanawat grew into a large village.

The first shaykh al-aql of Qanawat was Ibrahim al-Hajari who played a key role in mobilizing Druze resistance to the conscription orders of the Egyptian governor Ibrahim Pasha in the late 1830s. Ibrahim died in 1840 and was succeeded by his son Husayn. Qanawat at the time was under the control of the Al Hamdan, the leading Druze family of the Hauran. However, under Husayn’s leadership, the Hajari family formed the mashaykat al-aql, which gradually became the main religious institution recognized by the Druze of Hauran. The Al Hamdan used it to further their influence among the Druze, but lost Qanawat to the Bani al-Atrash in the 1860s. The latter only nominally controlled Qanawat with the al-Hajari family running the village’s affairs independently through the mashaykhat al-aql.

== Main sights ==
The city's extensive ancient ruins are 1500 m in length and 750 m in breadth. Among them are a Roman bridge and a rock-hewn theatre, with nine tiers of seats and an orchestra nineteen meters in diameter, also a nymphaeum, an aqueduct, and a large prostyle temple with portico and colonnades. North-west of the town is a late 2nd- or early 3rd-century peripteral temple, built on a high platform surrounded by a colonnade. For years, this temple was believed to honour Helios, but an inscription discovered in 2002 shows that it was dedicated to a local god, Rabbos.

The monument known as Es-Serai (also Seraya, "palace") dates from around the 2nd century AD and was originally a temple, and then, from the 4th/5th centuries, a Christian basilica. It is 22 m long, and was preceded by an outside portico and an atrium with eighteen columns.

The German explorer Hermann Burchardt visited the town in 1895, taking photographs of its antiquities, photographs which are now held in the Ethnological Museum of Berlin.

== Religious buildings ==
- Maqam Sheikh Abu Hussein Ibrahim al-Hijri (Druze Shrine)
- Khalwa Sheikh Abu Hussein Ibrahim al-Hijri

== Gallery ==
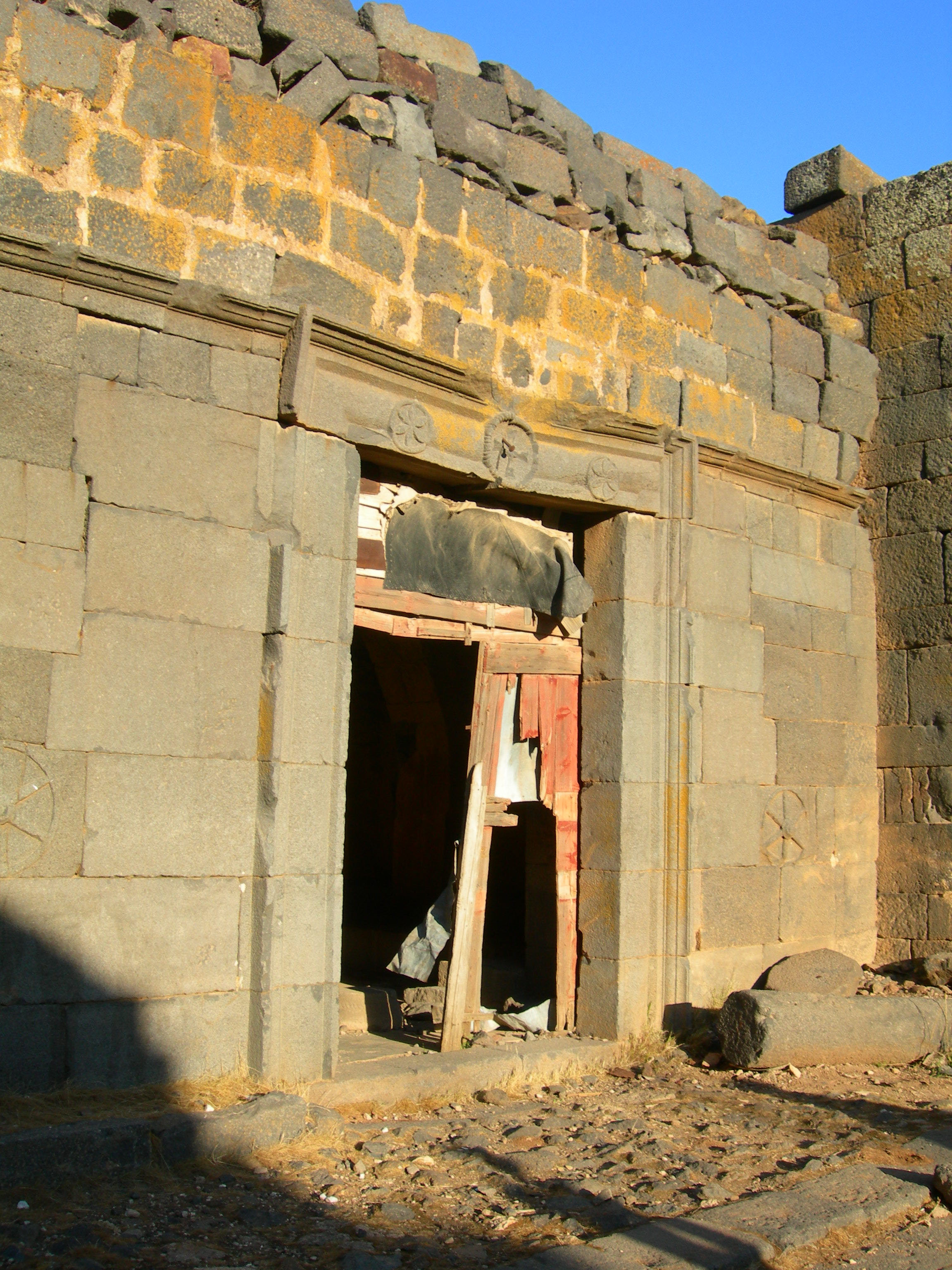
Roman building

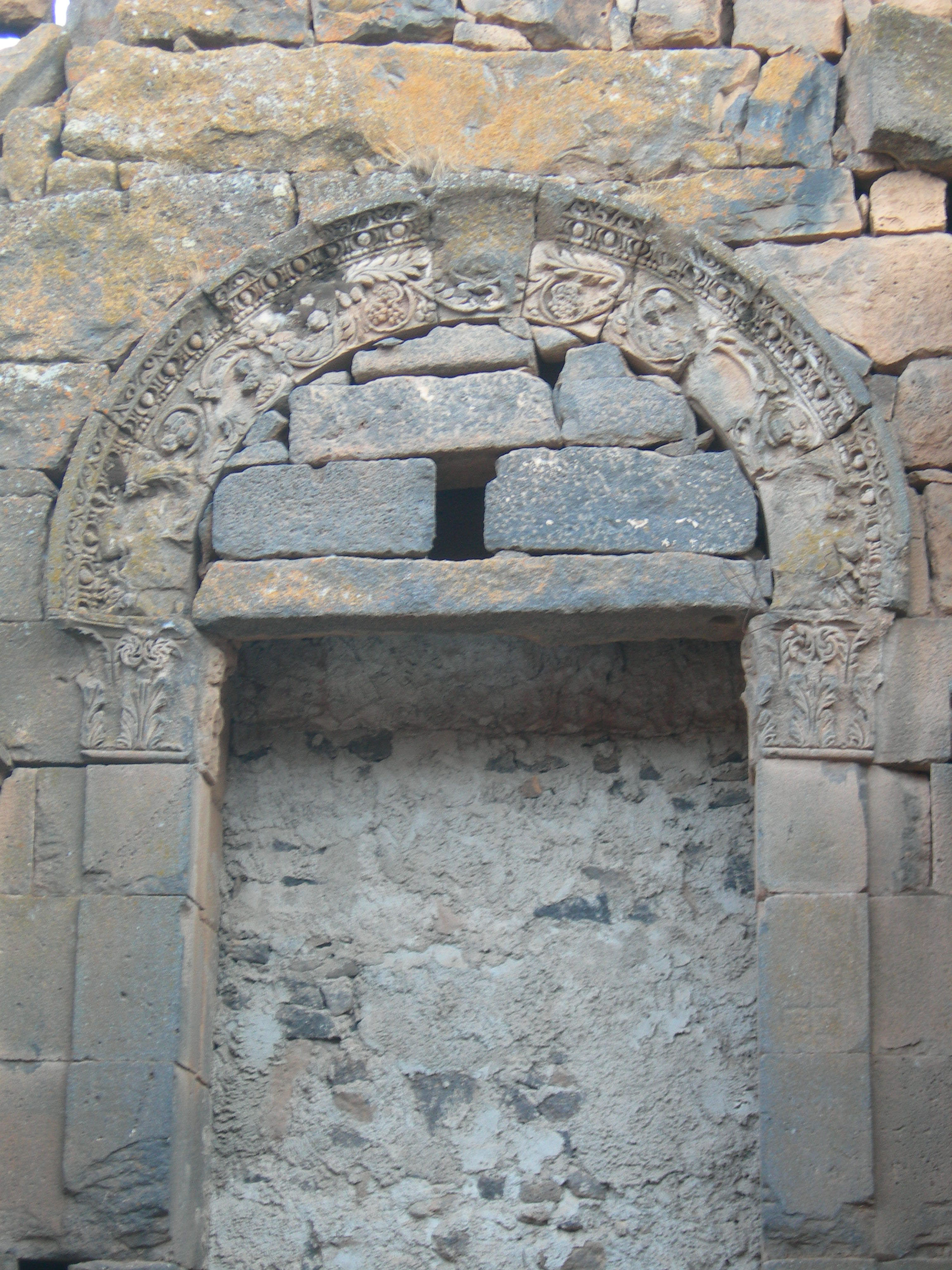
Window reliefs

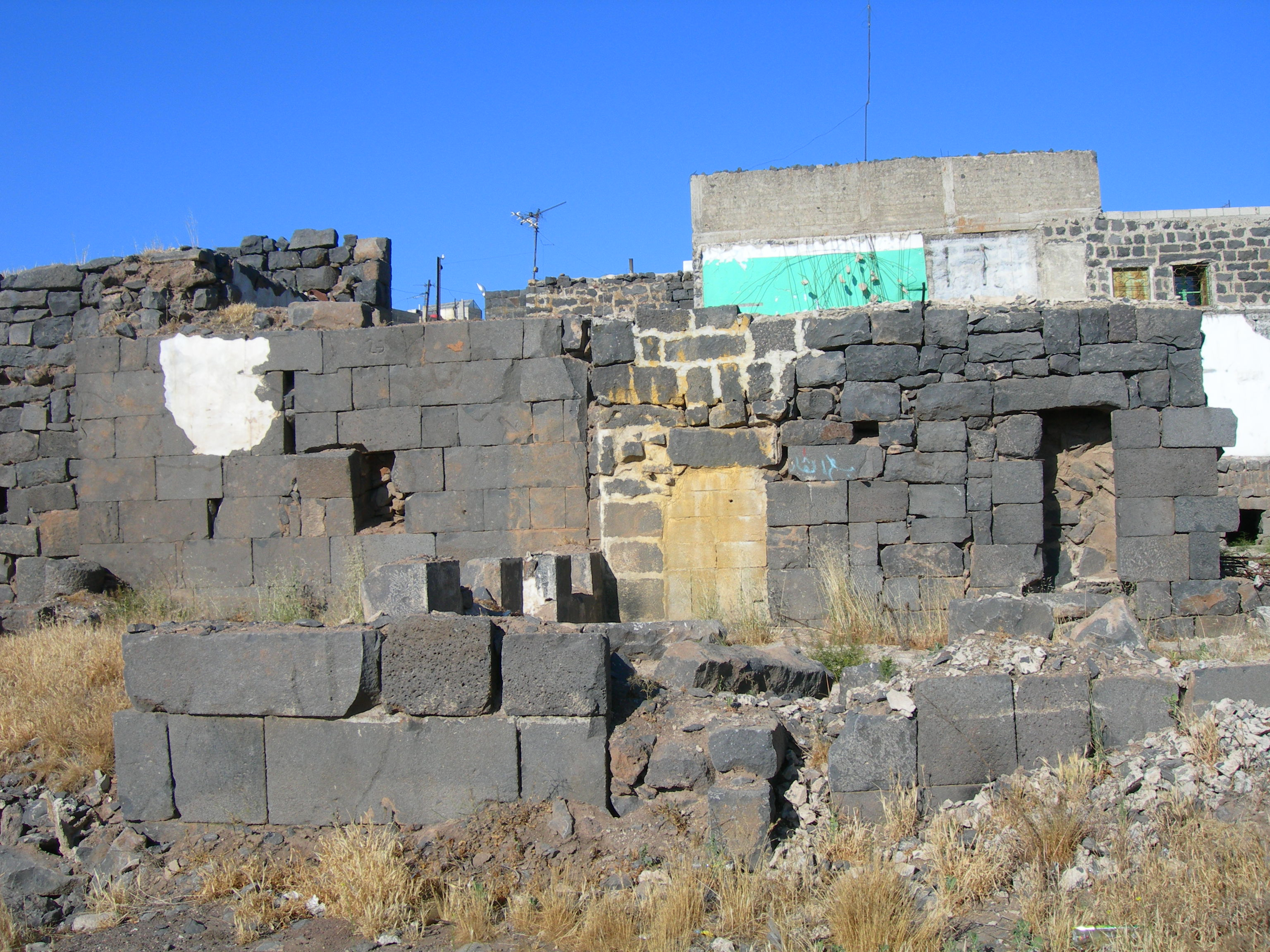
Roman building

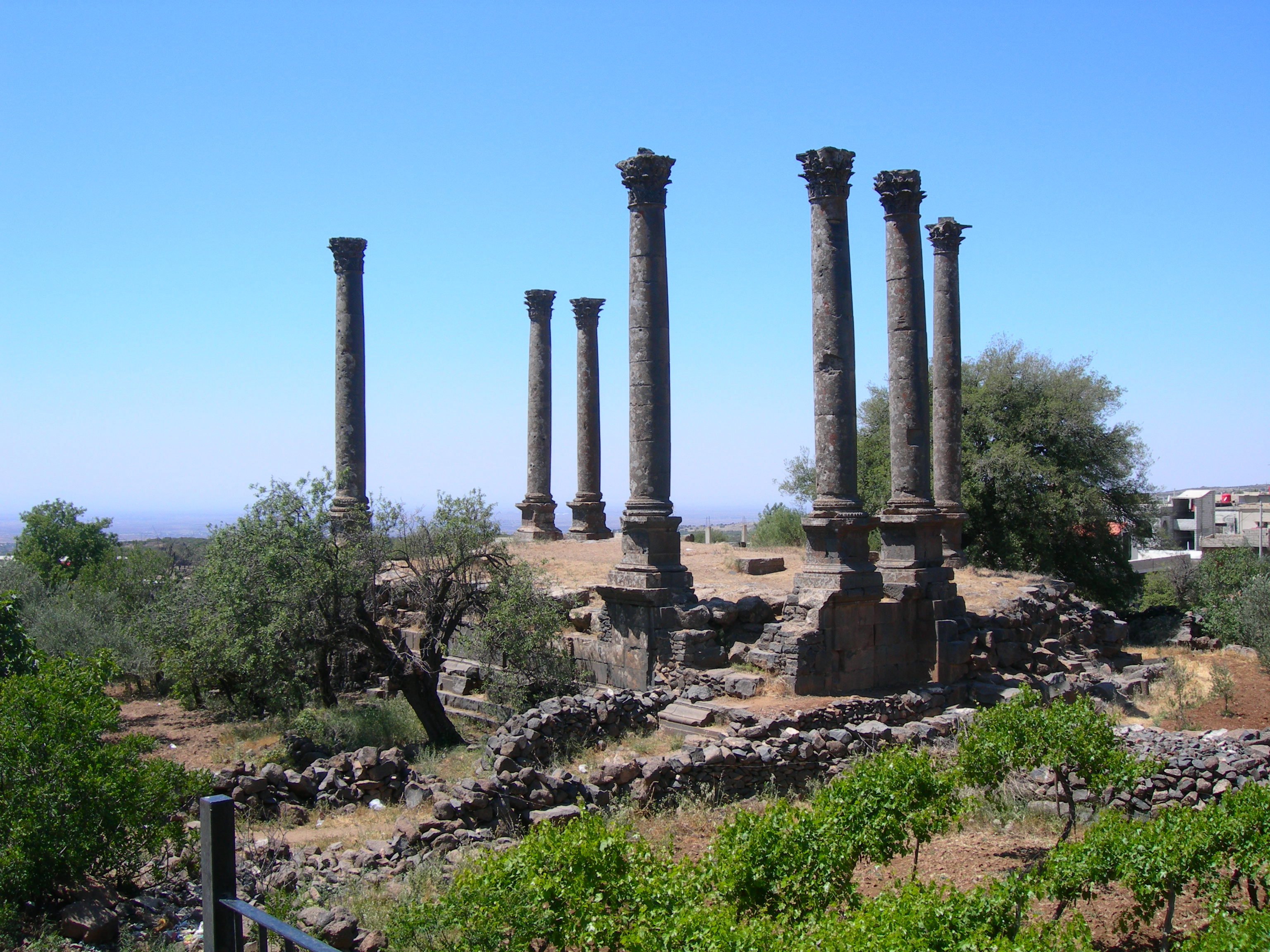
Temple of Rabbos

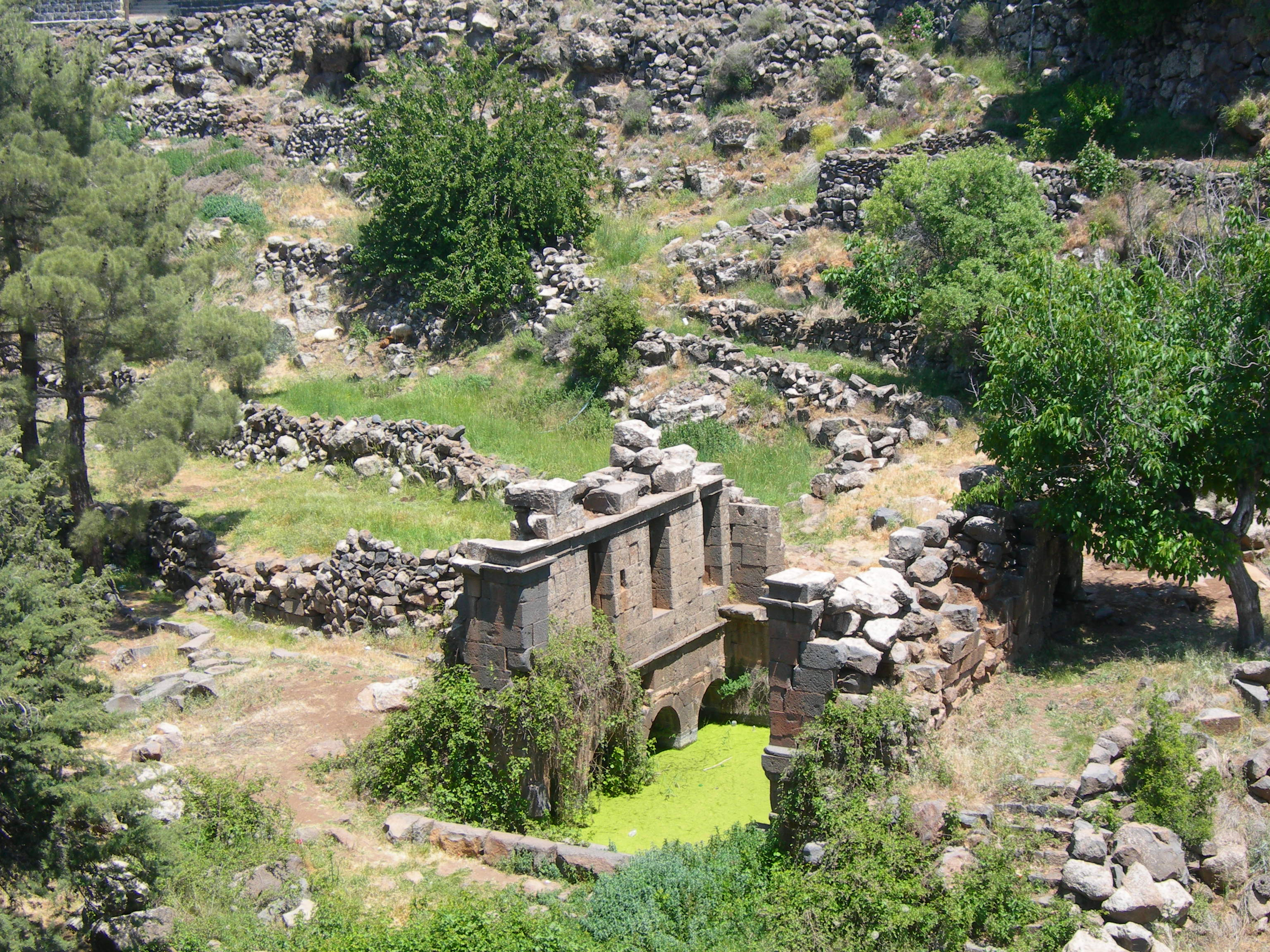
Roman nympheum

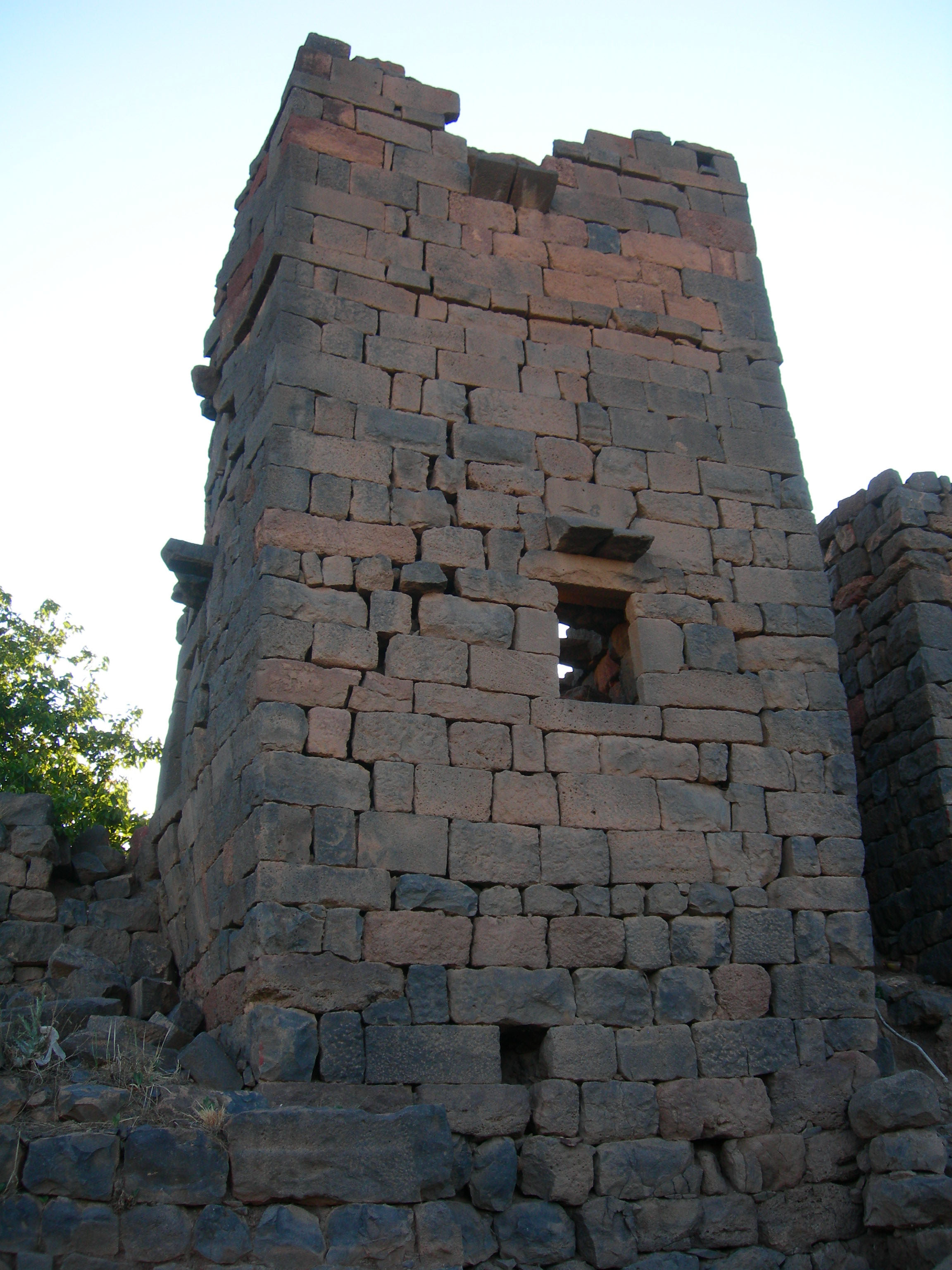
Roman tower

== See also ==
- Druze in Syria

== Bibliography ==
- Betts, Robert Brenton (2010). The Druze. Yale University Press. ISBN 978-0300048100.
- Burns, Ross (2009). The Monuments of Syria. I. B. Tauris. ISBN 978-0857714893.
- Firro, Kais (1992). A History of the Druzes, Volume 1. Brill. ISBN 9789004094376.
- Hütteroth, W.-D.; Abdulfattah, K. (1977). Historical Geography of Palestine, Transjordan and Southern Syria in the Late 16th Century. Erlanger Geographische Arbeiten, Sonderband 5. Erlangen, Germany: Vorstand der Fränkischen Geographischen Gesellschaft. ISBN 3-920405-41-2.
- The Princeton Encyclopedia of Classical Sites-Canatha
