= Château Saint Georges (Côte Pavie) =

Bordeaux wine producer in Saint-Émilion, France

Coordinates: 44.88499°N 0.15466°W

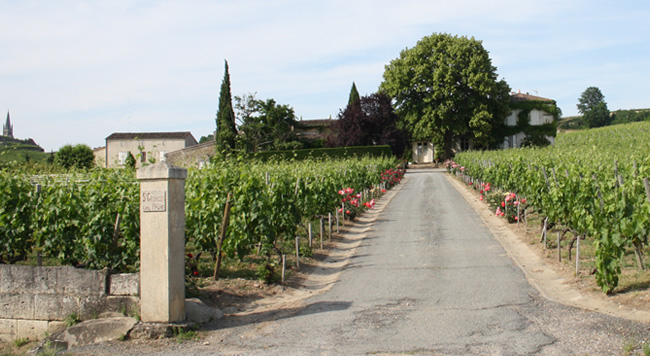
Château Saint Georges

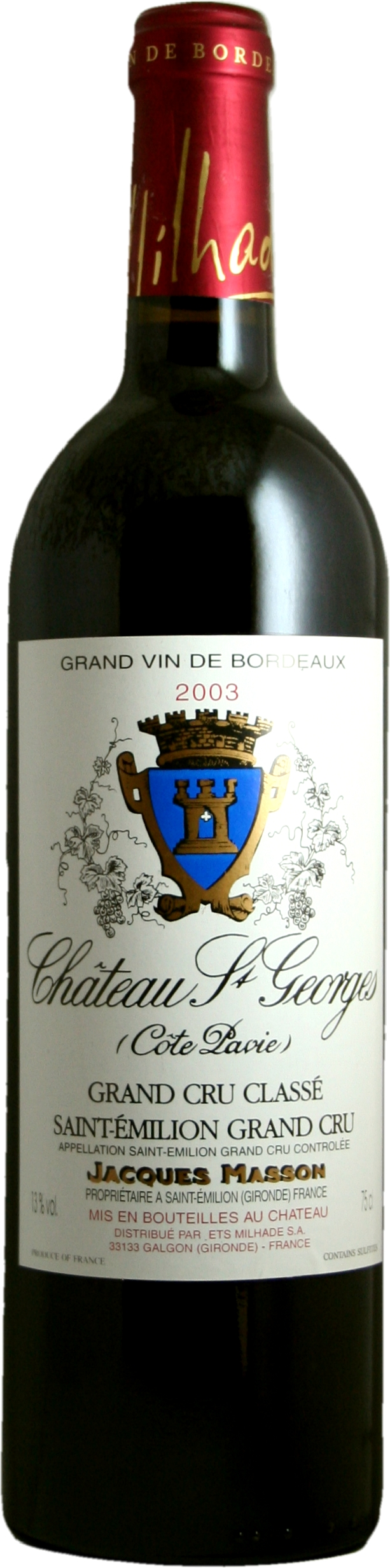
A bottle of Château Saint Georges (Côte Pavie) wine

Château Saint Georges (Côte Pavie) is a Bordeaux wine producer located on the Pavie hill (Côte Pavie) in Saint-Émilion. This 5-hectare (12-acre) estate is located between Château Pavie and Château La Gaffelière.
