= White wine =

Wine fermented without skin contact

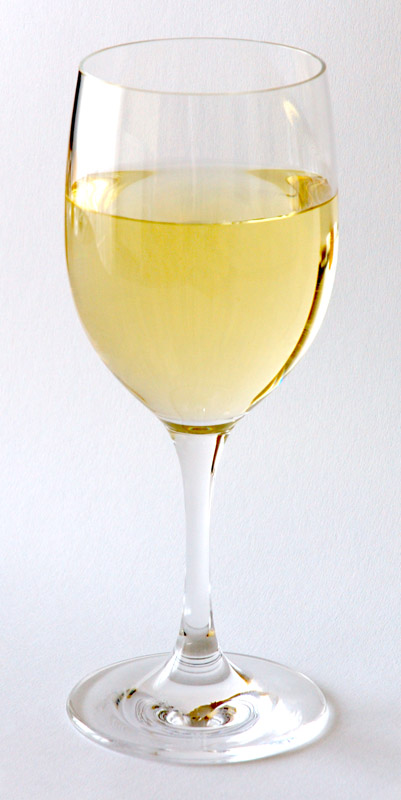
- A glass of white wine.
- Type: Wine
- Alcohol by volume: 5.5–20.5%
- Ingredients: Grape varieties fermented without skin contact
- Variants: See varieties

White wine is a wine that is fermented without undergoing the process of maceration, which involves prolonged contact between the juice and the grape skins, seeds, and pulp. The wine color can be straw-yellow, yellow-green, or yellow-gold. It is produced by the alcoholic fermentation of the noncolored pulp of grapes, which may have a skin of any color. White wine has existed for at least 4,000 years.

The wide variety of white wines comes from the large number of varieties, methods of winemaking, and ratios of residual sugar. White wine is mainly from "white" grapes, which are green or yellow in color, such as the Chardonnay, Sauvignon blanc and Riesling. Some white wine is also made from grapes with colored skin, provided that the obtained must is not stained. Pinot noir, for example, is commonly used to produce champagne.

Among the many types of white wine, dry white wine is the most common. More or less aromatic and tangy, it is derived from the complete fermentation of the must. Sweet wines, on the other hand, are produced by interrupting the fermentation before all the grape sugars are converted into alcohol; this is called Mutage or fortification. The methods of enriching must with sugar are multiple: on-ripening on the vine, passerillage (straining), or the use of noble rot. Sparkling wines, which are mostly white, are wines where the carbon dioxide from the fermentation is kept dissolved in the wine and becomes gas when the bottle is opened.

White wines are often used as an apéritif before a meal, with dessert, or as a refreshing drink between meals. White wines are often considered more refreshing and lighter in both style and taste than the majority of their red wine counterparts. Due to their acidity, aroma and ability to soften meat and deglaze cooking juices, white wines are often used in cooking.

Because of white wine's long history, its influence can be seen in various forms of art such as paintings and literature.

== History ==
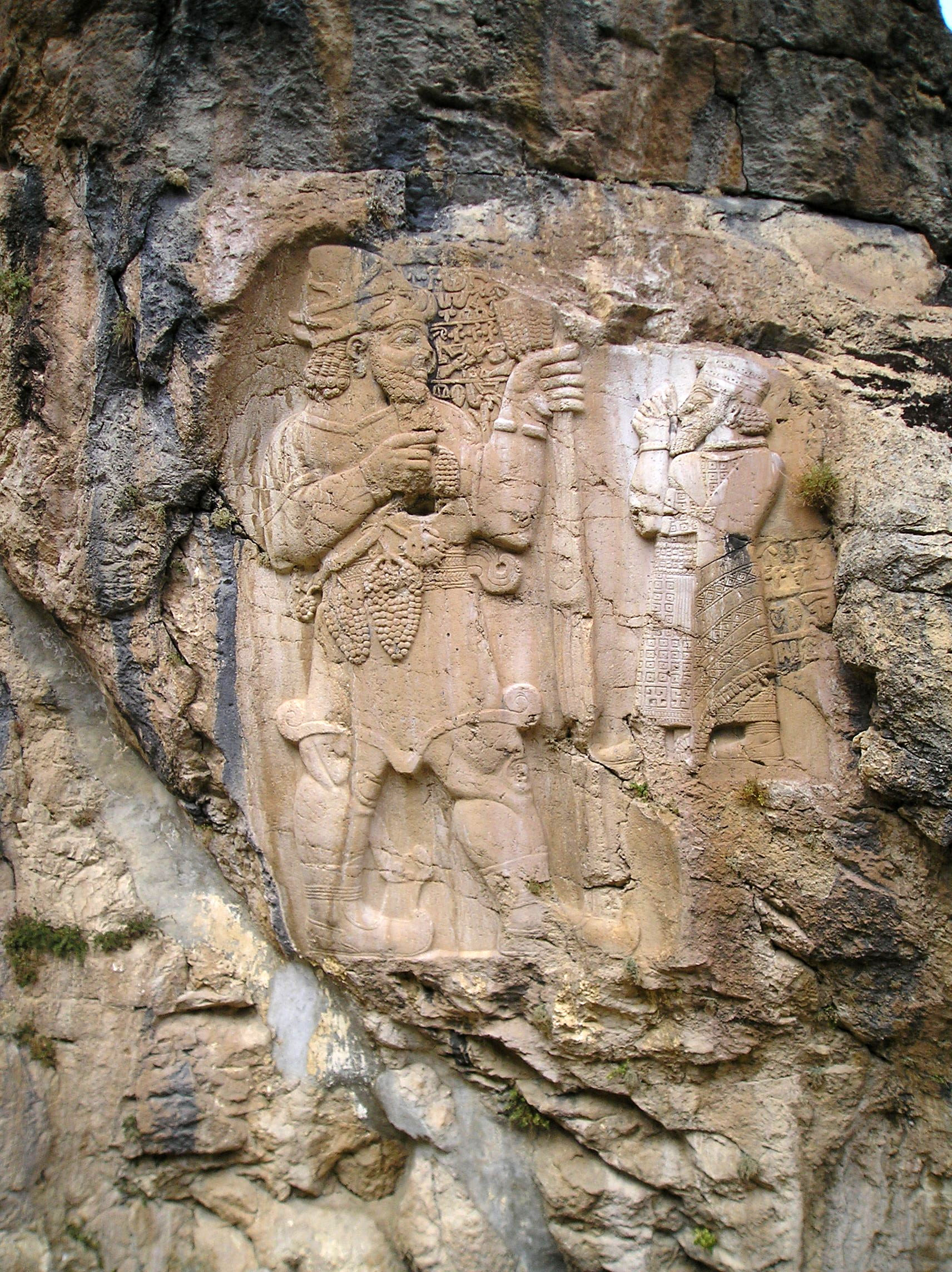
The Hittite King Warpalawa offering a bunch of grapes to the god Tarhunta. A bas-relief in rock at Ivriz in Turkey from the beginning of the 1st millennium BC.

=== Antiquity ===
The first trace of wine that has been found dates to 7500 years ago, in present-day Iran but the results of archaeological excavations have not been able to determine from which time wine began to be produced. Epigraphy tells us about the presence of wine in the Middle East. It was produced in the "High Country" (the mountain borders between Anatolia and Armenia) and then imported into Mesopotamia especially from the 3rd millennium BC. The tablets of Hattusa describes wine with the term wiyana in the Hittite language, GEŠTIN in Sumerian, (Note: A convention in Assyriology is to transcribe Sumerian in capitals and Akkadian in small italic letters to differentiate them.) and karânu in Akkadian. It could be red (SA_{5} GEŠTIN), light (or maybe white: KÙ.BABBAR GEŠTIN), good wine (DUG.GA GEŠTIN), honeyed (LÀL GEŠTIN) new (GIBIL), or sour (GEŠTIN EMSA).

In Ancient Greece wine had already been developed and used since Hippocrates, a physician born around 460 BC who commonly prescribed it to patients. "Vinous white wine" and "bitter white wine" were used among his remedies – a sign of diversity in production at that time.

In Roman times the type of viticulture practiced by the Greeks was their model; production included white wine. Rich Roman patricians organized banquets where the cost of the food was a sign of prestige. In the range of expensive products wine played a predominant role. The richest citizens built sumptuous villas in the Bay of Naples where the vine had been cultivated since its introduction by the Greeks. The aminum or ancient grape produced a sweet white wine produced as mulled wine resembling modern-day Madeira. The conquering of regions more and more to the north encouraged the Romans to cultivate the vine and to produce lighter and less sweet wines. It also encouraged them to seek new wild varieties adaptable to these distant areas where the Mediterranean varieties showed their limits. For example, vines were planted on the banks of the Rhine to provide the Legions with a healthy drink, as opposed to water which was rarely drinkable. The wine was drunk cool in summer and warm in winter, a practice which still continues in the 21st century. (Note: p. 113)

=== Middle Ages ===
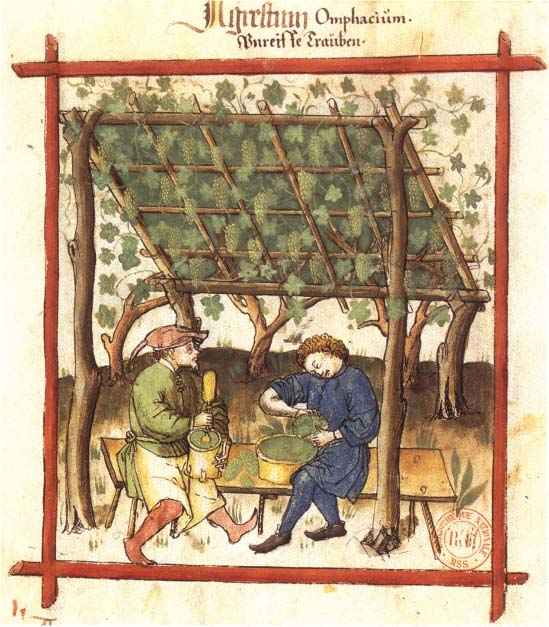
White grapes in the late Middle Ages

Wine merchants failed to survive the fall of the Western Roman Empire and viticulture declined dramatically. The Germanic tribes preferred to drink beer and did not see the value of the wine trade. The decline of viticulture was intensified when Vikings cut the sea lanes in the Atlantic. In the south the Saracens were making Ghazw or raids. These campaigns in southern Europe caused Languedoc, Provence, Southern Italy, and the Douro Valley to become depopulated – the people being taken into slavery or fleeing the threat.

Knowledge about the culture of grapevines was conserved by the Catholic Church: Wine was necessary for the celebration of Mass, and the monks planted vines at high latitudes and increased the monastic acreages. Difficult to transport and store, wine long remained a product for local consumption. The trade was re-established initially after the enrichment of the nobles and prelates because, as with the Romans, the art of the table reflected the reputation of the host. (Note: p. 129-137)

River trade was of great importance in the development of vineyards. The Germanic countries benefited from the navigability of the Rhine and the Danube so they could export their production. Charlemagne contributed to this growth by enacting his Capitulare de villis which included a set of rules on the cultivation of the vine in all areas, and the sanitary production of wines. It was an era of great development of the culture of white wine in Germany and Austria. The German vineyards reached 400,000 hectares in the 15th century, which is four times the area encompassed by German vineyards in the 21st century. From the 13th century, traders distinguished vinum hunicum (wine of the Huns), which was drunk by the people, from vinum francium (Wine of the Franks) which was the wine for the wealthy aristocracy. This terminology persisted so long that for centuries, when defining wine qualities, "Fränkisch" was used to designate a "fine" quality, and "Heunisch" was used for "coarse." The practice of constituting grapes as Frankish or Hunnic varieties left impacts that last to this day - exemplified through varieties including Blaufränkisch (Blue Frankish) and Weisser Heunisch (White Hunnic). There was recognition of varieties of Riesling and Sylvaner from the late Middle Ages.

Part of European trade was by sea along the Atlantic coast. The English, then the Dutch and Scandinavians from their demand for wine, created a craze for planting between Bordeaux and La Rochelle. Little dry white wine was produced for export from La Rochelle (Note: p. 141-142) while Bordeaux exported mainly wines from the hinterland received via the Garonne. When wine production was introduced on the banks of the Charente in the 17th century, Charente white wines were introduced as cognac. At the same time, the dry white wine popular with the Dutch was produced to the north, around the port of Nantes from the current areas of Muscadet AOC and Gros-plant AOVDQS in the Loire Valley. Vineyards in the Loire Valley and the South-west had their sales network thanks to the navigability of the Loire and the Garonne.

In the Mediterranean Basin the Crusades greatly enriched both rival republics of Venice and Genoa. To supply the troops of the rich Frankish lords these republics provided them with wine from Greece. The port of Monemvasia, which exported a large amount of white wine, gave its name to the variety Malvasia. (Note: p. 153-154) The Crusaders also discovered Muscat wine. Once back home, the rulers and wealthy aristocrats looked to buy the sweet wines they enjoyed in the East. They came from grapes that dominated the vineyards of Languedoc-Roussillon and Spain. Trade in these wines was facilitated by their high alcohol content which ensured preservation during the long journey to Northern Europe.

=== Modern era ===
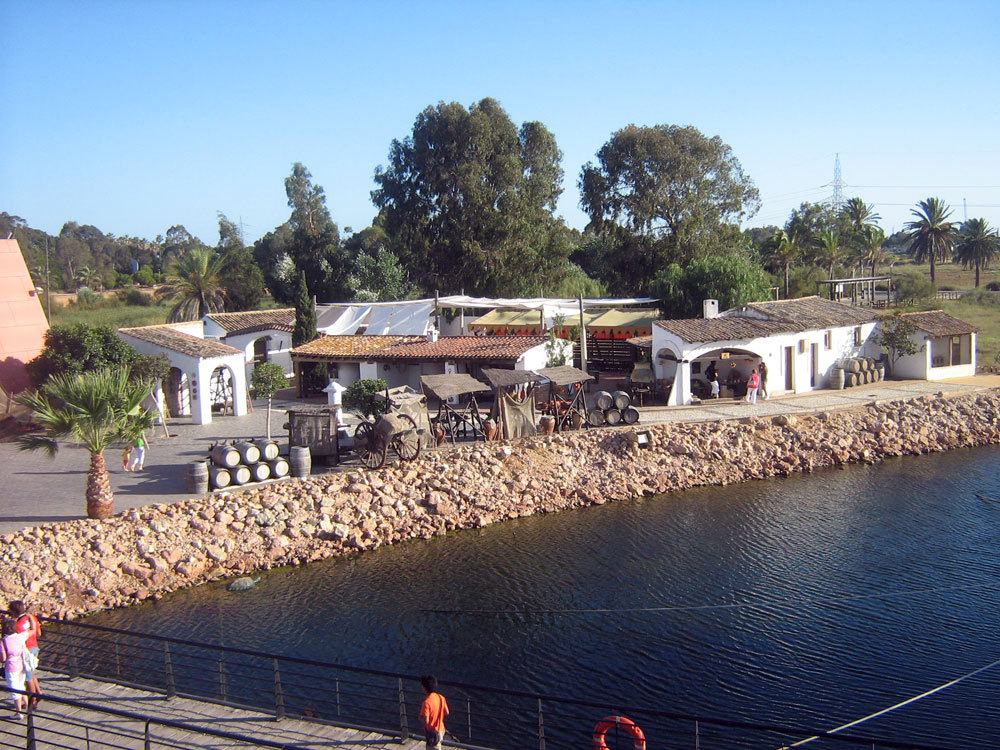
Reconstruction of the ancient port of Palos de la Frontera

In 1453 the Ottoman Empire took Constantinople and the situation of the Venetians and Genovese deteriorated. The wine trade between the eastern Mediterranean and northern Europe fell sharply. (Note: p. 171) At the same time, the Spanish had just completed their Reconquista and replaced the Mediterranean wine with its own, especially for English and Dutch consumers. The port of Sanlúcar de Barrameda began to export large quantities of white wine which was the ancestor of today's sherry. This wine was called sack and caused a sensation in England. Even at the height of animosity between the two countries (as in the episode of the Spanish Armada in 1588) the trade continued – sometimes provided by pirates who stole what they could not buy. Between 40 and 60 thousand barrels each of 500 liters left the Spanish coast annually for England and the Netherlands (Note: p. 173) (this volume of some 300,000 hectoliters represented two-thirds of today's production).

From the 16th century the first European vines were planted in America: in Mexico, then Peru, Bolivia, Argentina, and Chile. These were in addition to the native vines that grew in Mexico, but this pre-Columbian production was not for the production of wine since the grapes were too acidic. It was used to produce acachul a drink sweetened with fruit and honey.

The Little Ice Age spelt the death knell of northern viticulture. The vine disappeared from northern Germany and Baden, and the maximum altitude for viticulture descended to 220 meters. Hans-Jürgen Otto noted that: "all the vineyards suffered and decreased in area". In England the vine also disappeared. The less early vineyards preferred to select white varieties of grapes because, even if unripe, white grapes allowed wine that was a little sour to still be consumable, while red grapes do not give enough color, and green tannins make the wine bitter. The interruption of the fermentation by a cold winter led to the discovery of the process of secondary fermentation of champagne.

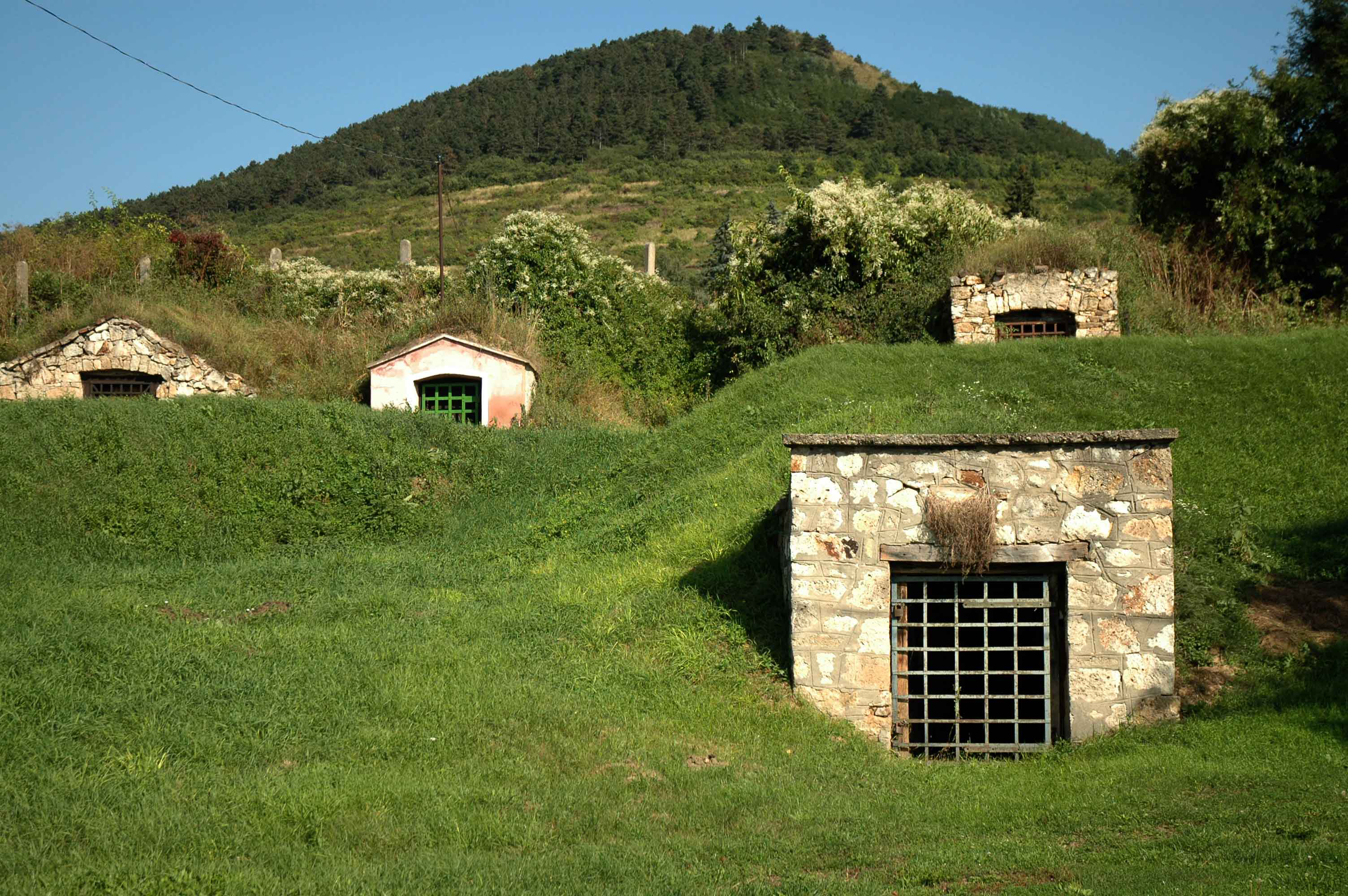
Cellars of Tokaj in Hungary, where the secrets of the process were kept

The enrichment of some of the population created a craze for rare wines. This phenomenon, which was already responsible for the development of sherry in England, was reproduced in Central Europe. The discovery of the benefits of the noble rot on white grapes took place around 1650 (Note: p. 232) in Hungary for the development of Tokaji wine. Hugh Johnson declared that: "the Tokay of three centuries ago was the best sweet wine in the world, it was inherited from a long-standing winemaking tradition". (Note: p. 235) Developed with a grape whose exceptional maturity is due to a trade secret, this wine also developed its qualities through a process that long remained a secret in underground cellars of the winery. Prized by the House of Habsburg, Tokay experienced profitable trading. Attempted imitation came to nought and the use of noble rot remained a secret. It was not until 120 years later that a method of very late harvest was experimented with on the steep banks of the Rhine. Its use in Sauternes was attested in 1836 in the Château La Tour Blanche but at that time very late harvest gave a very rich wine that required several years to age in barrels. (Note: p. 264)

The fashion of drinking cheap dry white wine started in Paris in the 18th century. To evade the excise duty, Parisians took the habit of going to drink their wine at the producers premises outside the walls of the city. Cabarets opened their doors by the river, becoming Guinguettes (similar to taverns): so the wine that was drunk there was also called "guinguet". This is a wine from the hills of the Seine or the Marne, sour, but the conditions of transport of the time did not allow it to be used prematurely.

=== Contemporary era ===
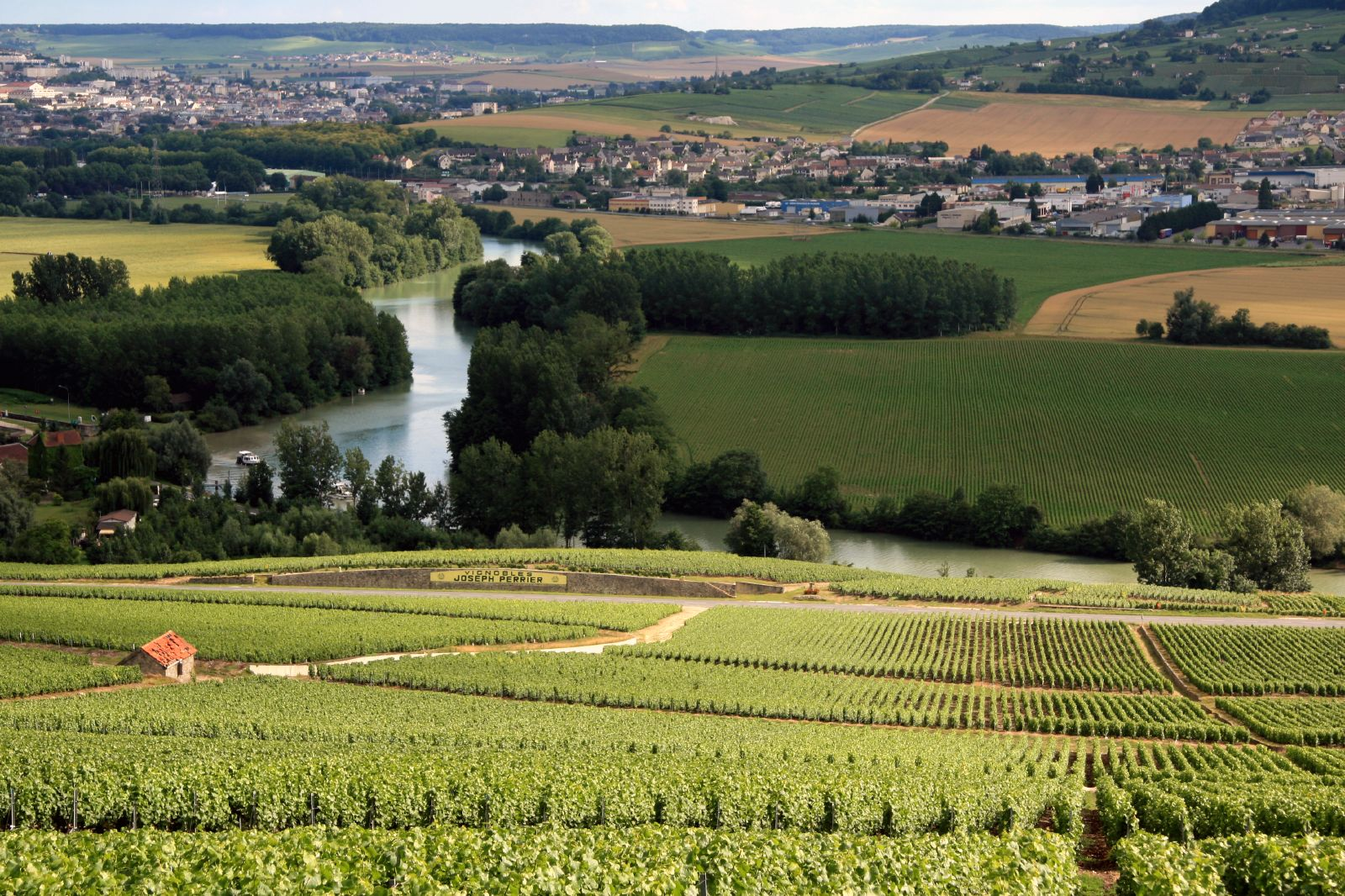
Landscape of hills in Champagne

Champagne was created in the 18th century but it was in the next century that its global expansion would occur. The crowned heads of Europe quickly made the wine stylish in their courts although its production, necessarily in bottles, made for a very expensive product. Historian Hugh Johnson (Note: p. 331) assigns an important diplomatic role to champagne: Talleyrand would have offered this wine at the negotiating table of the Congress of Vienna, using it to relax his partners in the discussions. The occupation of Champagne by Russian troops in 1815 publicized the sparkling wine to the Russian aristocracy. The Veuve Clicquot (Widow Clicquot) booked her wine to her occupants saying "they drink today, tomorrow they will pay..." (Note: p. 335)

The progress of the glass industry (especially from the use of coal) helped to democratise the use of the glass bottle. The production of sparkling wine increased dramatically and spread to the American continent. The technique of manufacturing was industrialized and other regions were inspired but the reputation of champagne suffered. The commercial flight of champagne was a product of the Industrial Revolution that allowed it to be within the financial reach of the emerging middle classes. (Note: p. 339)

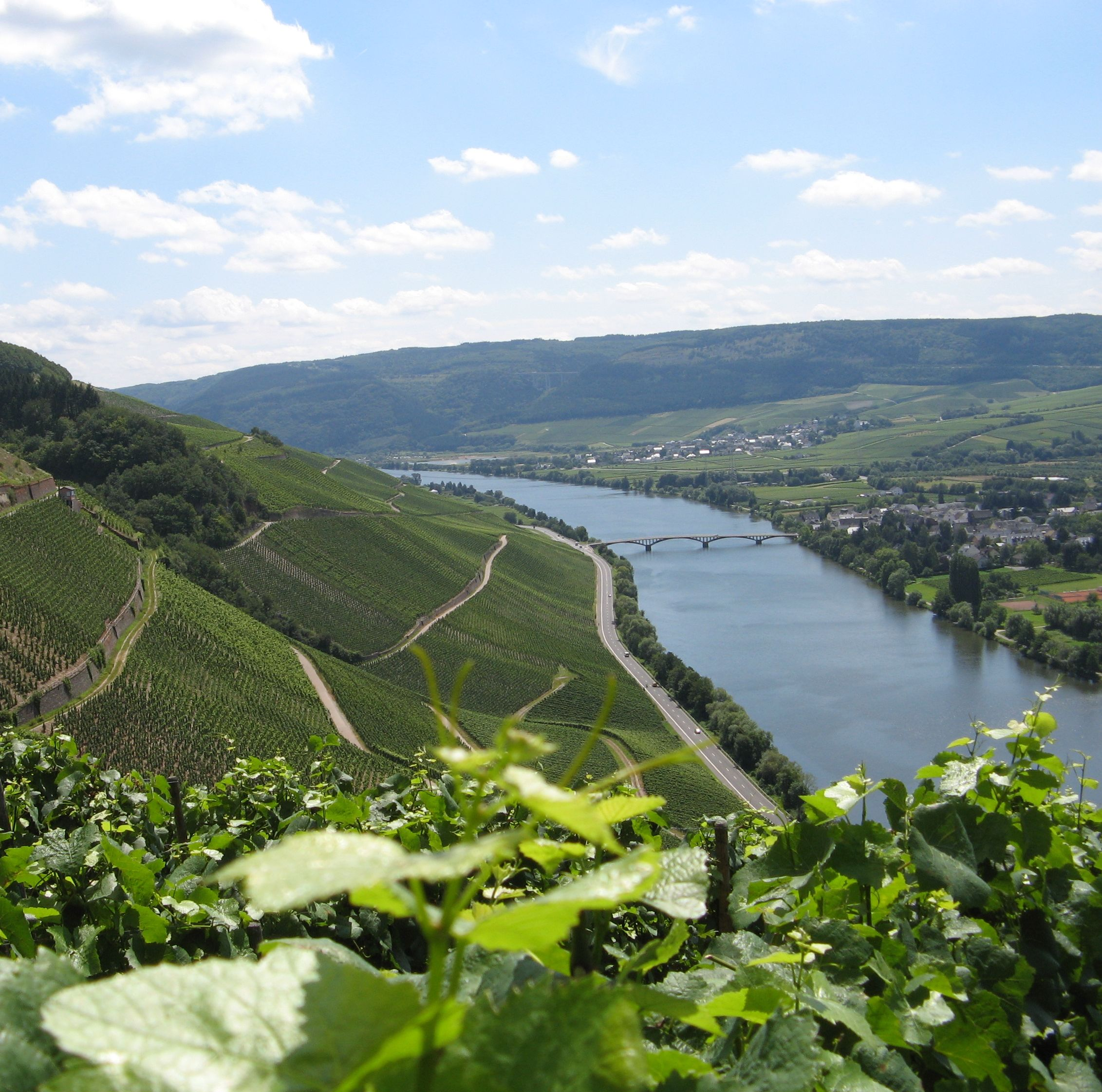
Steep slopes of the Moselle in a German vineyard, Annaberg at Schweich

The period of the 19th century before the arrival of phylloxera was a golden age of wine. The Industrial Revolution enriched a bourgeoisie clientele for the best wines and the rural exodus to factories created a large market for mass-produced wines. A prominent example for white wines was the viticulture in Germany. The feeling of freedom infused into the German winemakers under French occupation during the First Empire prevented the aristocracy and the clergy from recovering all the vineyards from which they were dispossessed. (Note: p. 395) The practice of late harvest was widespread and the more or less sweet wines gained balance against their always lively acidity. In 1872, the Geisenheim Grape Breeding Institute was created, and it was the source of a great amount of interbreeding giving new varieties – the best known of these is the Müller-Thurgau. (Note: p. 396) During the same period, Switzerland adopted, along the shores of Lake Geneva, vineyards predominantly producing white wine.

During the 20th century planting vines in countries where it was unknown was booming. However, it was shaky in places with higher temperatures during fermentation. (Note: p. 450) The use of larger containers creates problems during fermentation: the yeasts produce heat which cannot escape and beyond 35 °C the micro-organisms begin to suffer and fermentation slows then stops. After cooling the wine a new addition of yeast is needed to resume fermentation (not to mention the adverse effects on the wine's aromas and the risk of lactic bite). In California the search for temperature control of fermentation matured. Applied to white wine they revolutionized this type of wine. European wines, marked by their processes of crushing the grapes, (Note: p. 397) are diametrically opposed to those very fruity wines marked by a refreshing liveliness. During the years 1960–1990, these methods of wine-making moved to Europe and the use of refrigeration equipment is now widely used in almost all regions producing white wine.

== Geographical distribution ==
Percentage of white wine consumed by countries where the inhabitants each consume more than 7 liters per year
Country	%
World average	40.6%
Australia	60%
Czech Republic	60%
New Zealand	56%
Luxembourg	53%
Finland	50%
United Kingdom	47%
Austria	46.9%
Ireland	44%
United States	40%
Germany	39.8%
Argentina	39%
Italy	37%
Sweden	36%
Canada	35.1%
Switzerland	31%
Netherlands	30%
Russia	30%
Belgium	28.4%
Spain	28%
Denmark	27%
Norway	25.1%
Chile	25%
Portugal	25%
France	21%

=== Climatic zones ===
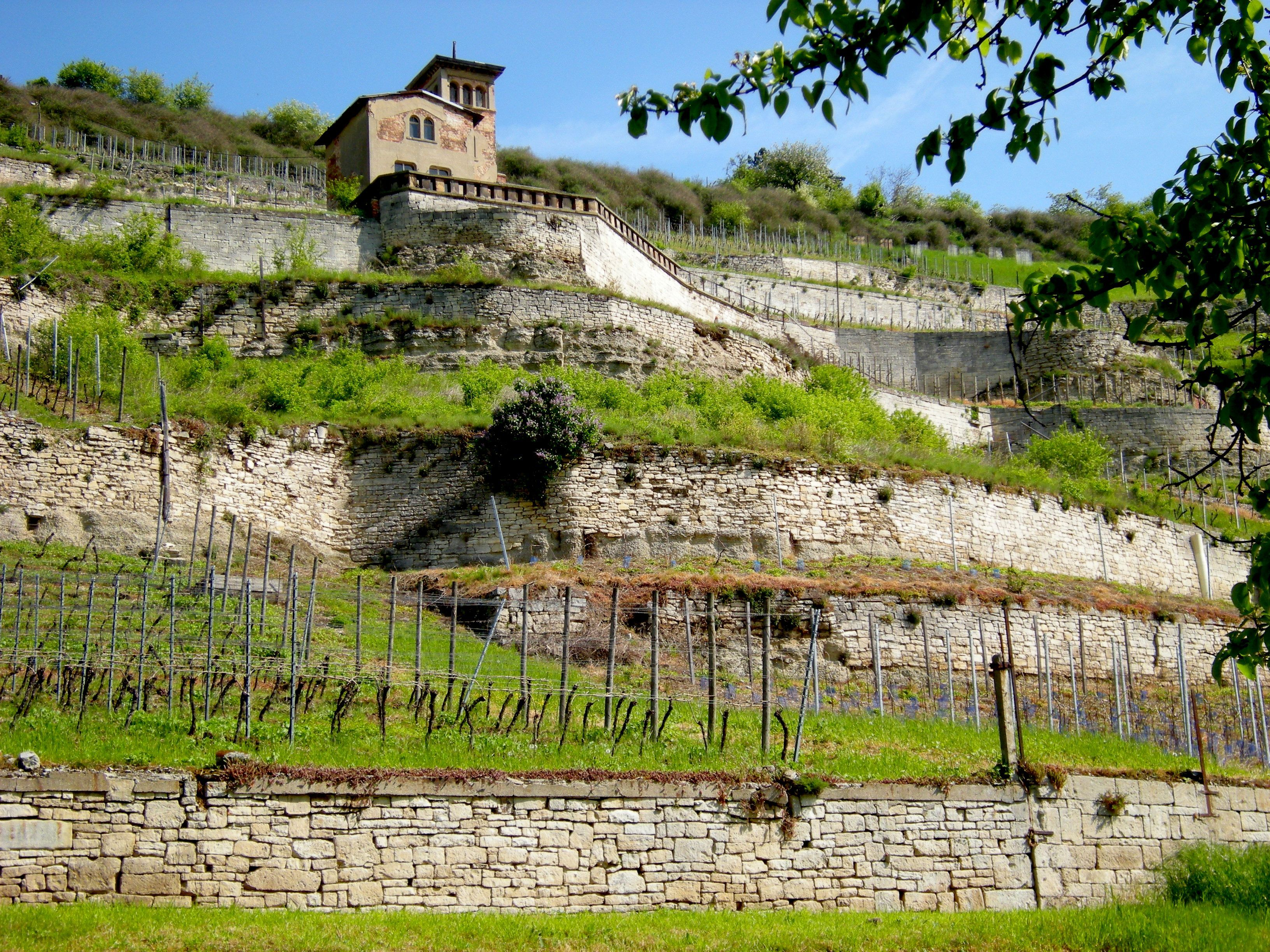
A German vineyard, one of the most northerly in the world

Many wine-producing countries produce white wine. However, the white grape needs less heat than red grapes to ripen: The lack of maturity of tannins is not a problem since they are not extracted in pressing. In addition the taste balance is based on a significant liveliness due to the acidity. The grapes for the production of dry white wine are harvested just before ripening. These production conditions can result in a more northerly or mountainous location for the vineyard producing dry white wines.

In Europe, German vineyards are predominantly white (63.1% of production area in 2006), as are the Swiss vineyards (more than 50% of the area in production are white grapes) and the Luxembourg vineyards (93% of the production area in white or gray grapes). In France the northern half produces most of the white wines (Alsace, Jura, Champagne, and the Loire Valley). In Spain, paradoxically, Castile-La Mancha accounts for 50% of the Spanish vineyards, producing mostly white wine on a very large production area in a high temperature zone. The Catalonia region produces a lot of white grapes, which are transformed into Sparkling wine called Cava. The producing area for Cava is 45,000 hectares out of a total producing area of 65,600 hectares.

The Americas have developed several white wines, some of which are now recognized worldwide. White wines have to conquer hostile territories, such as the Rocky Mountains or Canada. In Canada, the technique of ice wine can produce exceptional wines in a climate which is apparently unfavorable. Canada is the largest producer of ice wine in the world.

The warmer southern areas also produce white wine, but in a lower proportion. In addition, it is more often sweet or fortified wines, natural sweet wines or "vinés" wines, (Note: The "Wine viné" is one in which alcohol is added after fermentation, wine "muté" has alcohol added during fermentation, and the wine "liqueur" has alcohol added before. See "Wine muté", Grand Terminological Dictionary, Office québécois de la langue française, 2006, consulted on 27 December 2010 (in French).) as in the case of vineyards around the Mediterranean (muscat, madeira, marsala etc.).

=== Geological zones ===
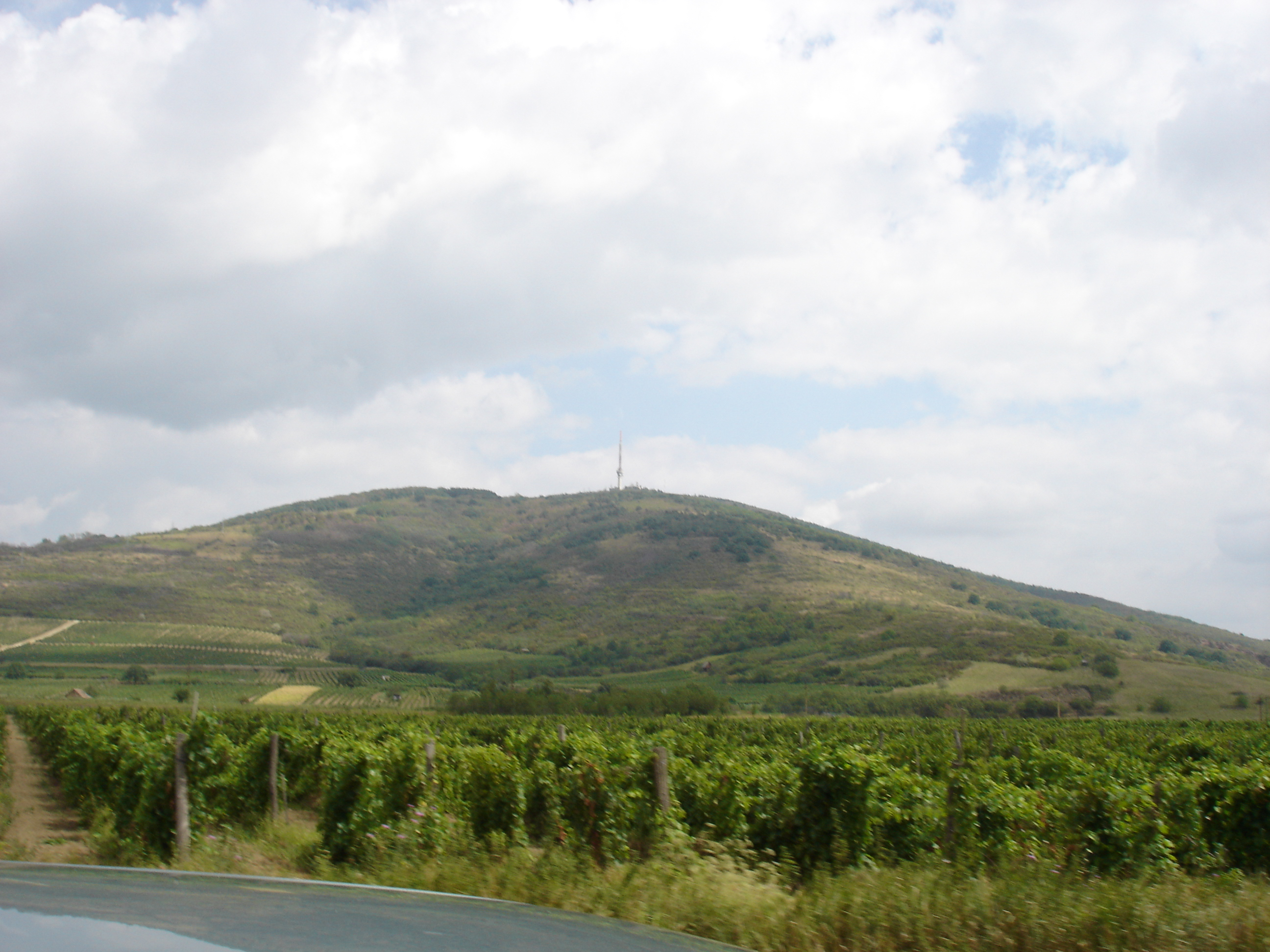
Volcanic terrain of Tokaj

According to Claude and Lydia Bourguignon, the best white wines are produced on soils over metamorphic rocks (Alsace, Moselle, Anjou) or volcanic rocks (Tokaj in Hungary and Slovakia).

In addition, white wines are also produced on land with a limestone sub-soil such as the chalky base of the Champagne wine region or the limestone under siliceous marl of Chassagne-Montrachet form the backdrop to some of the most prestigious wines in the world.

== Grape varieties ==
Numerous varieties of grapes can be used to develop white wine. Some have achieved a strong reputation thanks to their marketing of a wine variety:

- Chardonnay: (Note: The International code designating the variety indicates the color of the grape:: B = white (blanc), N = black (noir), Rs = rose, G = gray.) originating from Burgundy and long sold under that name under the communal AOC or premier and grand crus, it has spread to many new producing countries who sell under the name of the grape. It can be made sparkling or still. It typically has a wider-bodied and rich citrus taste compared to other white wines. A common choice of food pairing for this wine is fish or poultry. It owes its world distribution to its quality in a very wide variety of regions of climate and geology: from France to the United States, Australia, and South Africa
- Sauvignon blanc: originating from the centre of France and the Bordeaux vineyards, it then spread to the vineyards of the South-West and the Loire Valley. Noticed by Anglo-Saxon consumers, it spread to growing regions in the United States, Australia, New Zealand, and South Africa. It is remarkable for its typical vegetable/mineral aromas (Note: p. 230-231.) so tends to be flat and lack fruit qualities. The dominating flavors range from sour green fruit such as of apple, pear and gooseberry through to tropical fruit such as melon, mango and blackcurrant. A common food pairing for this wine is seafood, poultry, and salad.
- Riesling: originates from German vineyards (Germany, Alsace, Switzerland). It is a grape that can be of high quality in a variety of soils provided that yield is limited and climate tends to a continental climate. (Note: p. 220-221.) This type is much lighter in comparison to other white wines and typically has a green apple aroma. Common food dishes that go well with Riesling are fish, chicken, and pork.
- Müller-Thurgau: the most widely grown grape in Germany, which gives a fruity and well-balanced wine but that cannot be kept very long (Note: p. 172-173.)
- Muscat : a group of varieties (over 150 according to Pierre Galet) which have specific aromas. Typically made from Italian- and Austrian-grown grapes, it can offer a sweet and fruity taste. Shows best on its own without a food pairing.
- Petite Arvine originated in the Valais in Switzerland. Historical documents reveal it has been grown since the early 17th century, around 1602. Typically medium-dry, this textured wine contains a generous amount of extract from its thick-skinned berries. Highly regarded by modest vintners, it has become the most frequently grown wine in the most prominent wine-growing region of Switzerland. The variety is often paired with central and northern European foods.
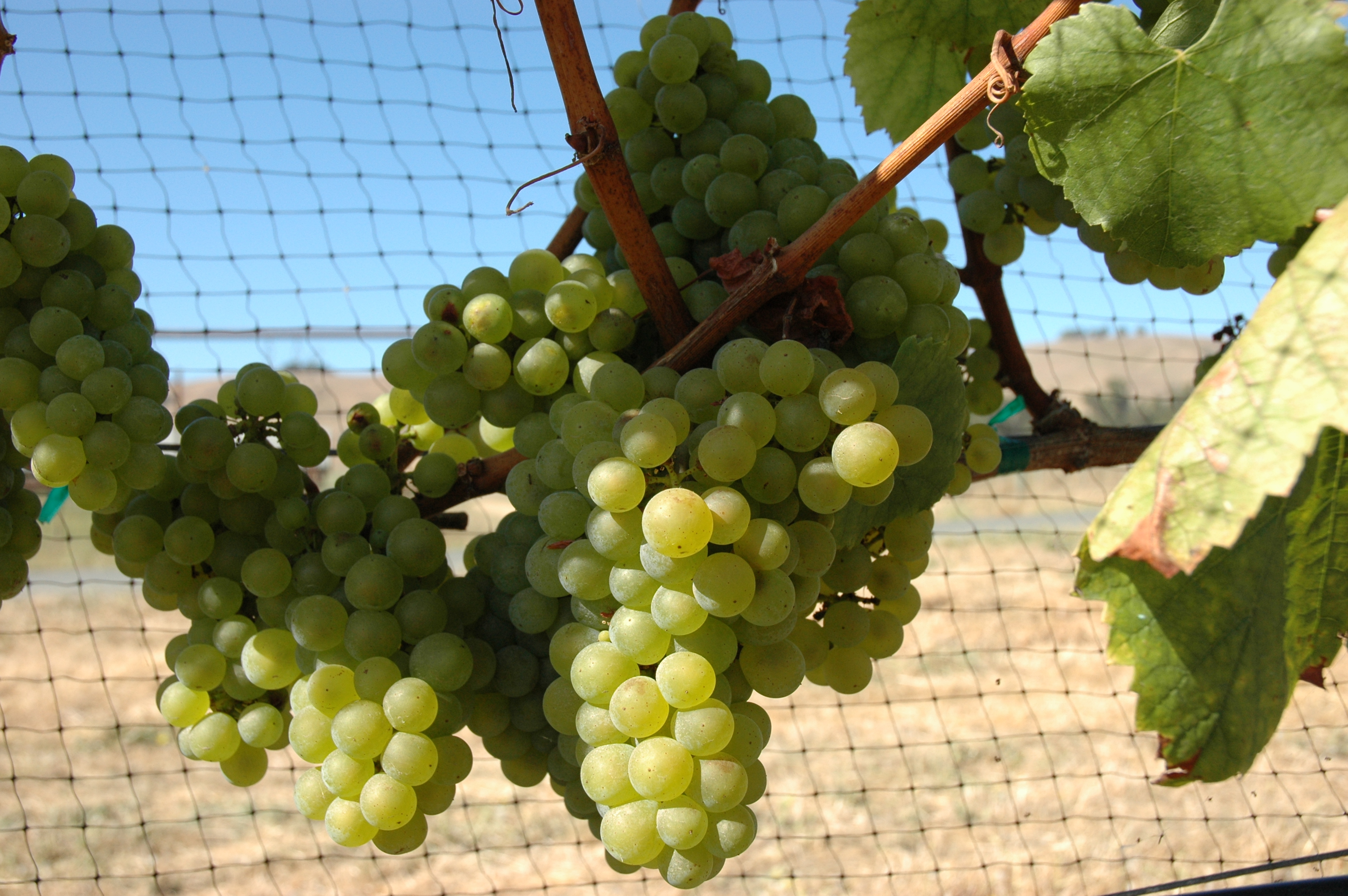
Chardonnay grapes

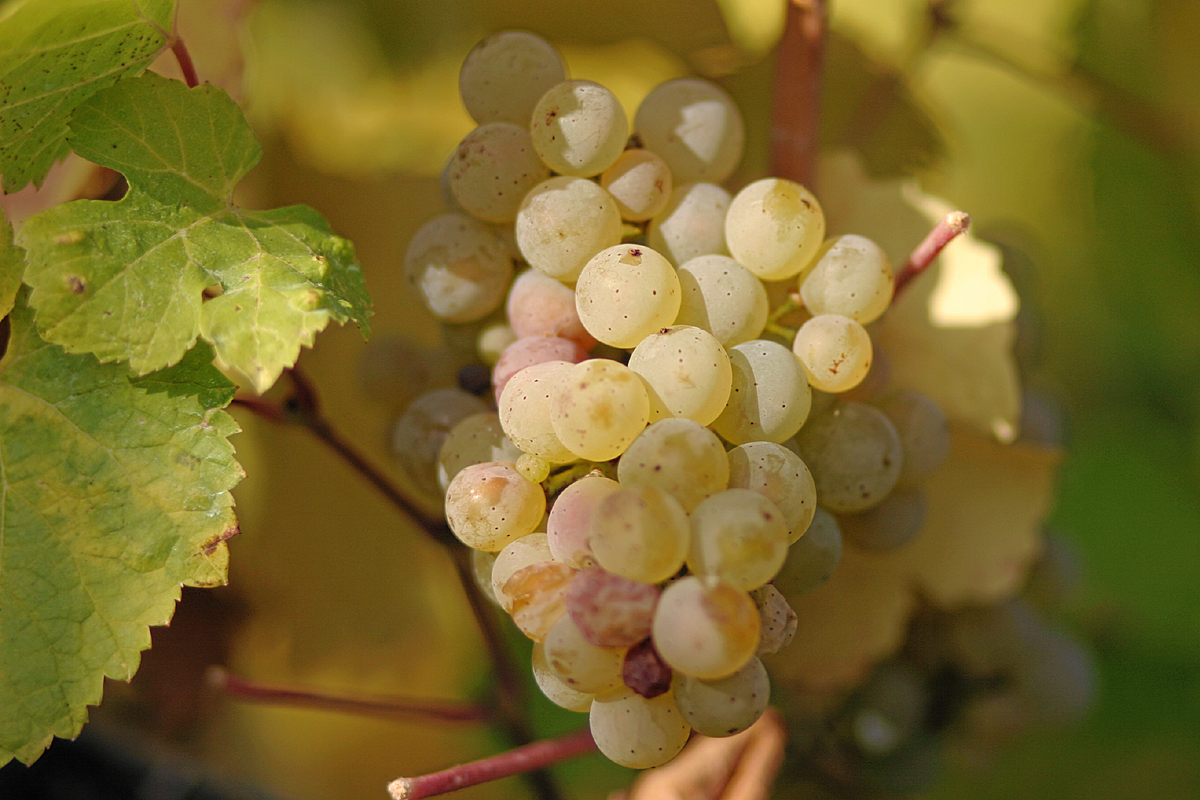
German Riesling B grapes at maturity

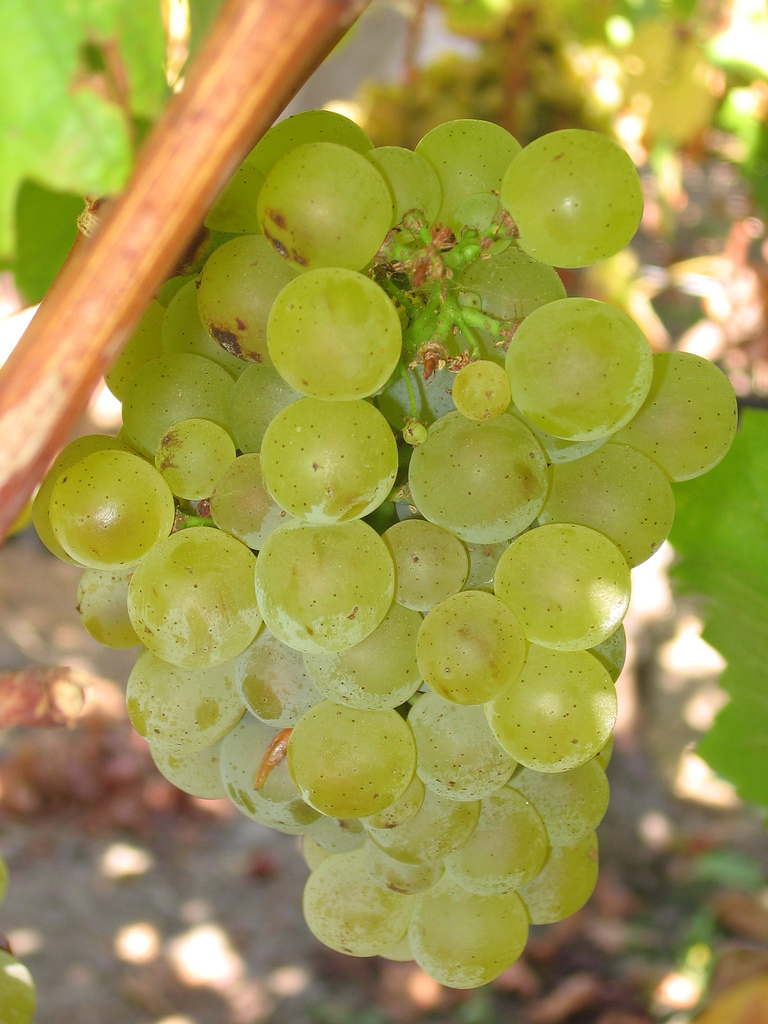
Sauvignon blanc

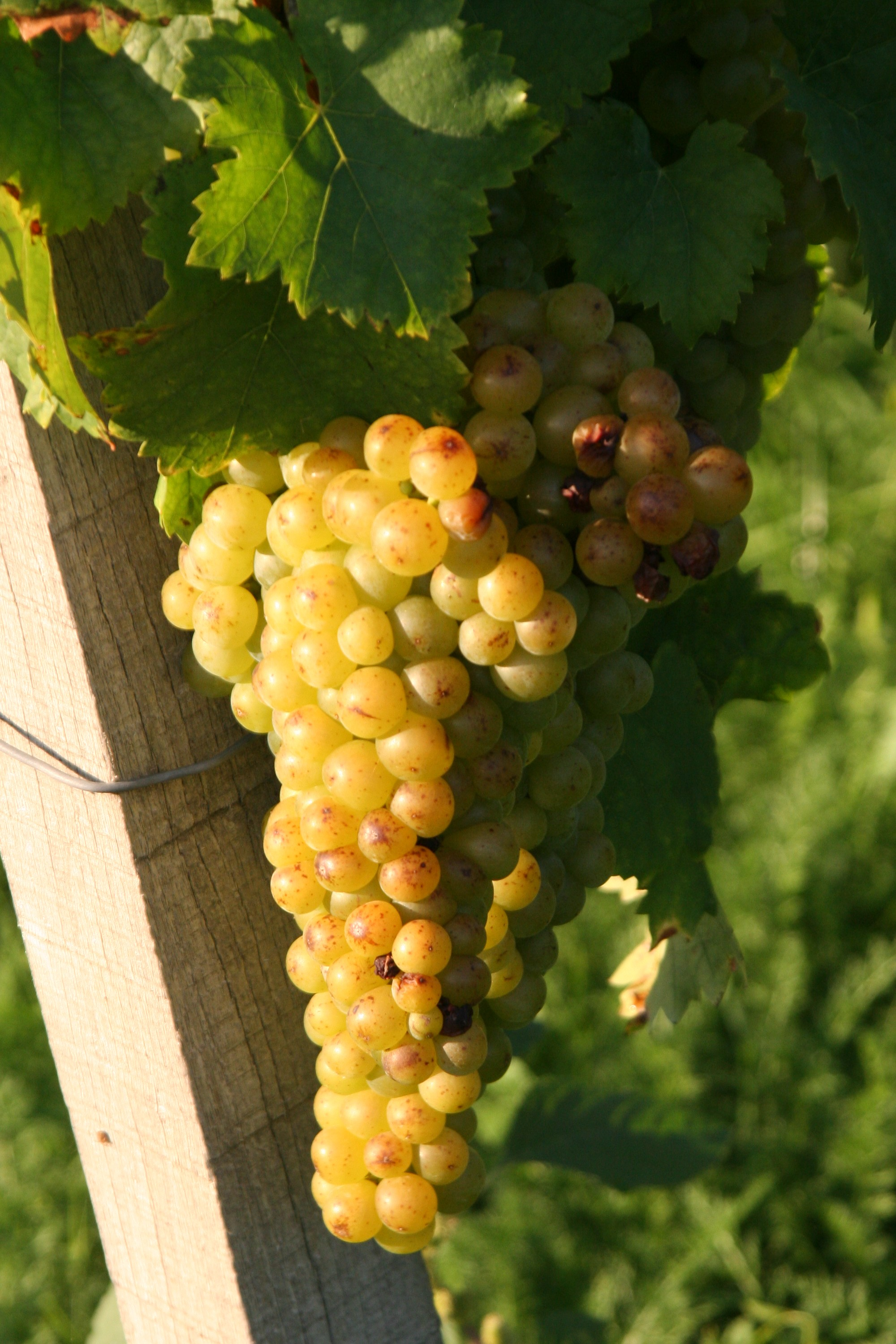
Small white grapes of Muscat B

Other grape varieties are less well known because they may be marketed under an Appellation or mixed with other varieties:

- Airén: a little-known variety, yet it is the most planted vat wine in the world with 390,000 hectares. It is second only to the sultana. Grown almost exclusively in Spain, it is planted in a low density and produces a dry white wine consumed locally
- Catarratto bianco comune: a grape from southern Italy, it gives an aromatic and high alcohol (14% of volume) wine. It is one of the varieties of grape used to produce Marsala and Madeira.
- Chenin blanc: a French grape from the Loire Valley, it is also grown in South Africa. It yields a very fruity wine, sometimes mineral, dry, or sweet depending on the soil. It can be kept for a long time and take on the noble rot
- Maccabeu: a Spanish grape, used to develop Cava, the Spanish sparkling wine. It is also grown in the vineyards of Languedoc-Roussillon in France. Its wine is dry and fruity and yields a Fortified wine
- Sémillon: a grape originally from Bordeaux vineyards, it is the main variety used for sweet wines from Bordeaux and Bergerac due to its ability to take the noble rot. (Note: p. 235-236.) It possesses a figlike characteristic and is often paired with Sauvignon blanc to mellow its strong berrylike flavors.
- Trebbiano bianco or Ugni Blanc: an Italian grape variety giving a fairly neutral wine. In France this wine is usually distilled to yield cognac or armagnac (Note: p. 256-257.)
- Viognier: a French grape from the Rhône Valley, it has been planted in California since the 2000s. It yields a very fruity and complex wine (Note: p. 269.)
- Grenache blanc: this is the white form of Grenache black N. A variety of quality, it produces fine full-bodied dry wines, albeit with sometimes deficient acidity. It also provides natural sweet wines of high quality. (Note: p. 143)
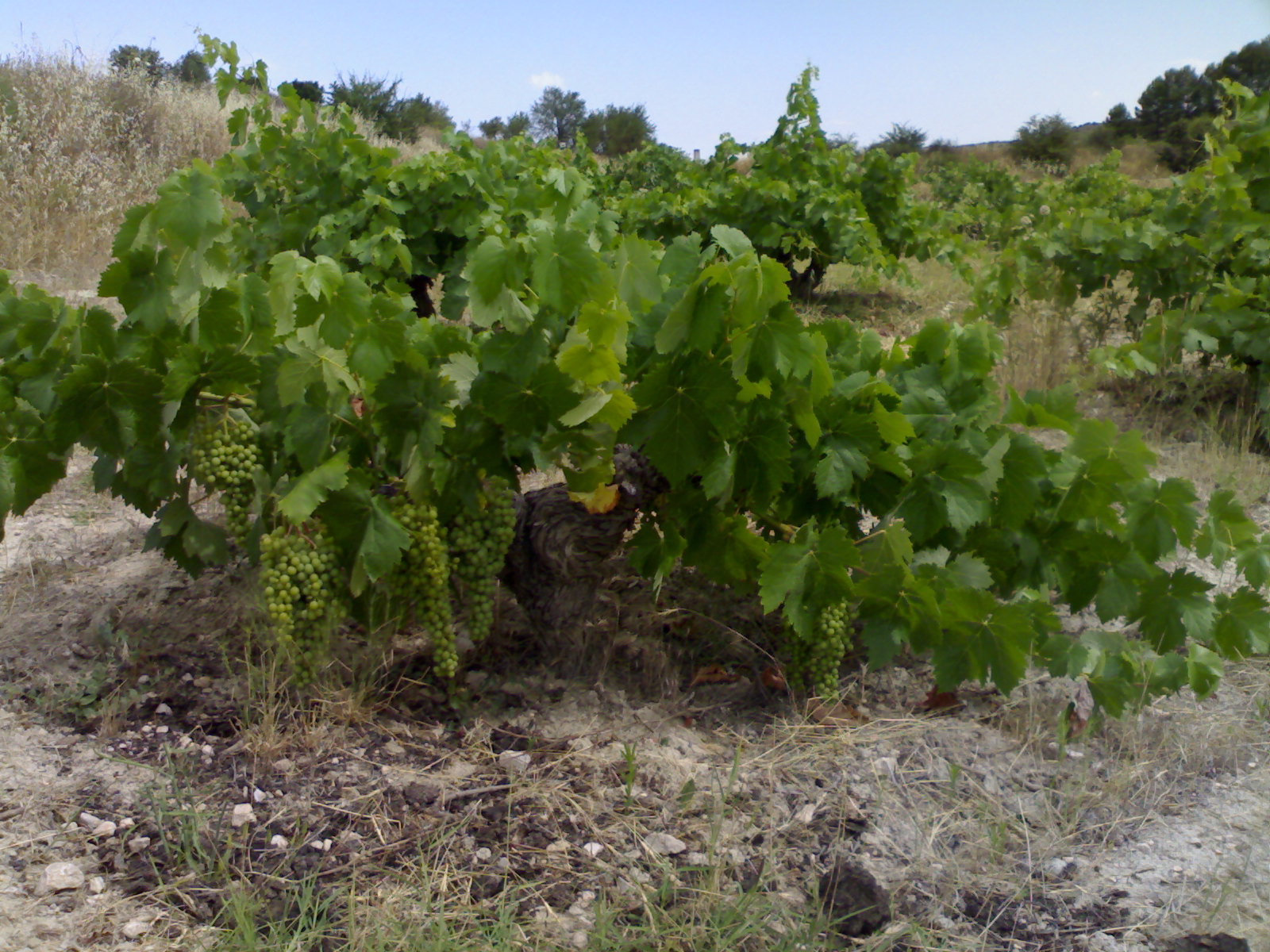
Grapevine of Airen, the most planted vat grape in the world

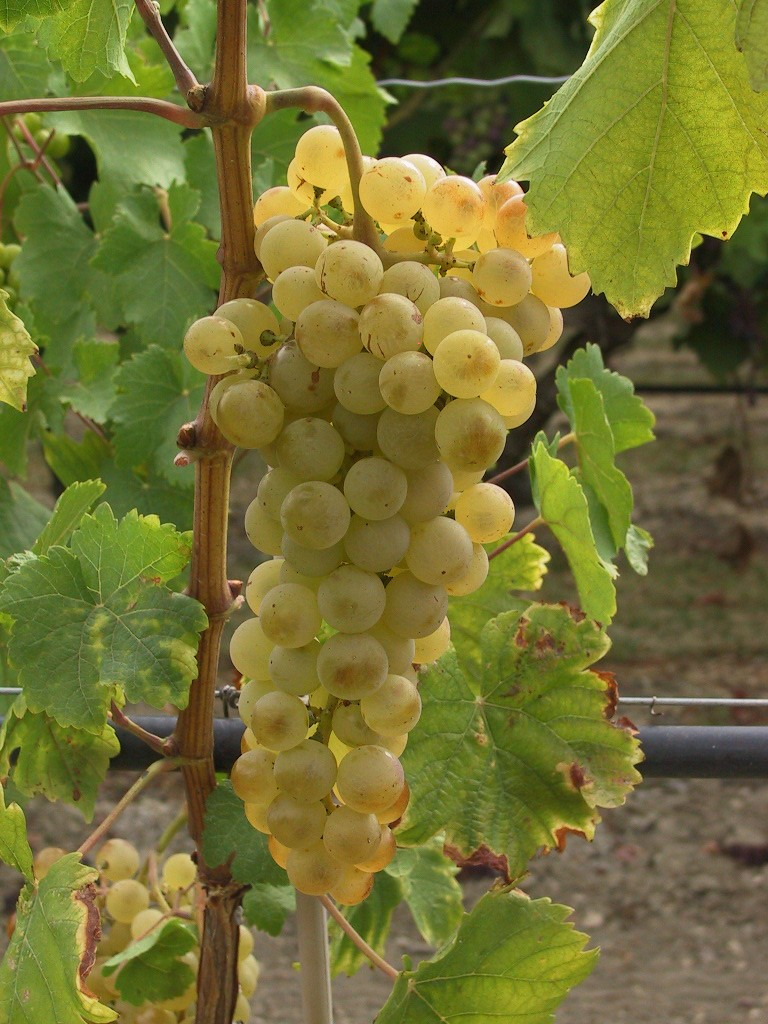
Chasselas, for vat and table wine

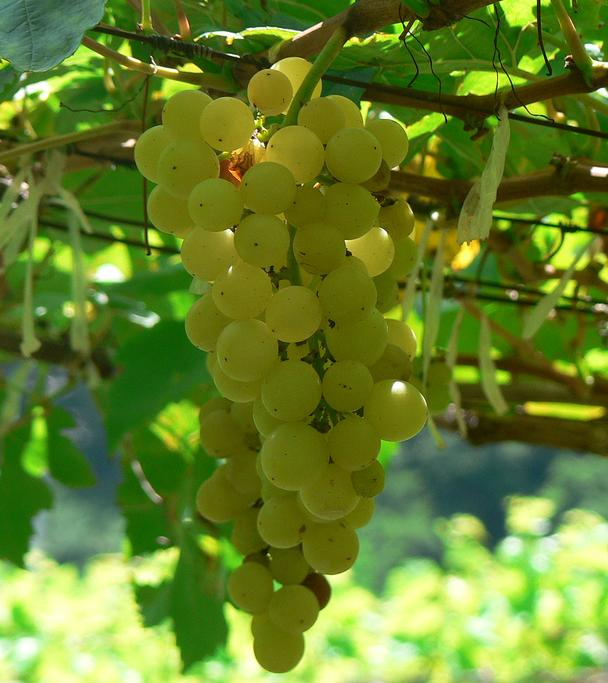
Chenin

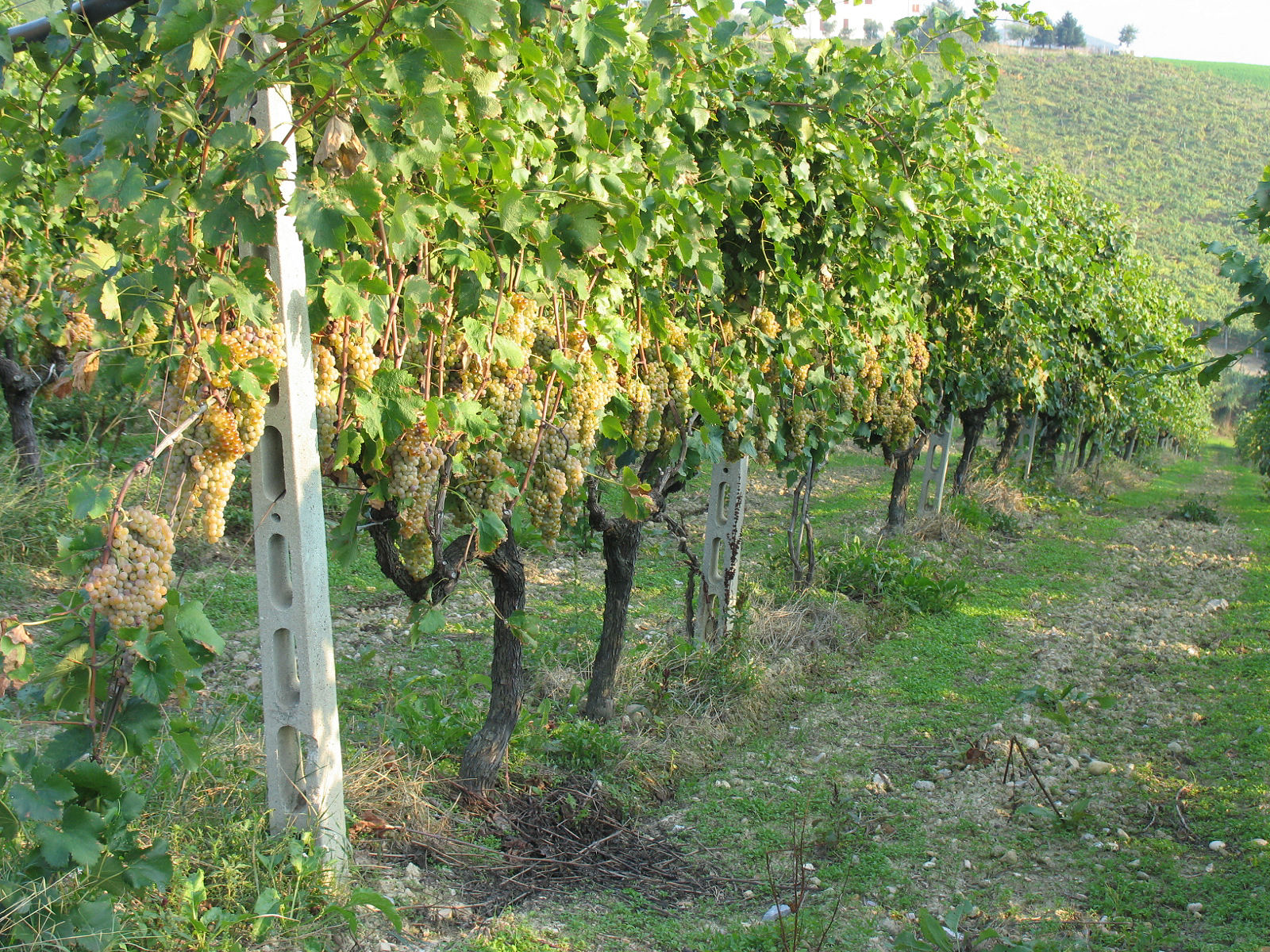
Trebbiano blanco or ugni blanc B

Some varieties with colored skins are also used to produce white wines:

- Gewürztraminer: This grape has a pink skin. Vinified in white, this is a very aromatic grape with typical aromas reminiscent of pink flowers and lychees. It is grown all over the Alps. It is an aromatic mutation of Traminer (in German gewürzt means "spiced")
- Grenache Gris: this is the rosé form of Grenache. It is used in the amber versions of Grenache from Rivesaltes AOC, a natural sweet wine white with a darker color from oxidation.
- Malbec: this deep purple and thin-skinned grape variety is typically used for making red wine. However, white Malbec wines have been produced in recent years, with the first vintage being produced in 2011.
- Pinot gris (Pinot grigio): is planted extensively the Venice region of Italy. The color of these grapes range from a copper yellow to light pink. It typically has a crisp fruity flavor which allows for a versatile food pairing.
- Pinot noir and Pinot Meunier: These grapes are used for the development of champagne and rose wines.
- Sauvignon gris: used to make rosé from Sauvignon blanc, it has a richness in sugar and heavier aromas. It is often used in the production of sweet wines (Note: p. 234)
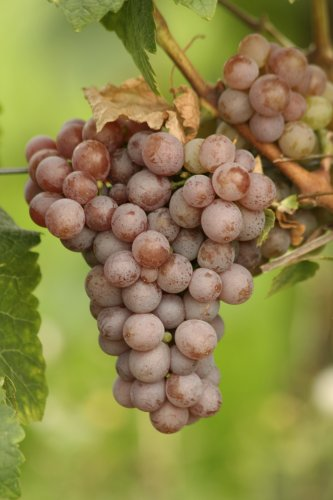
The Gewurztraminer grape variety with a pink skin, which produces a white wine

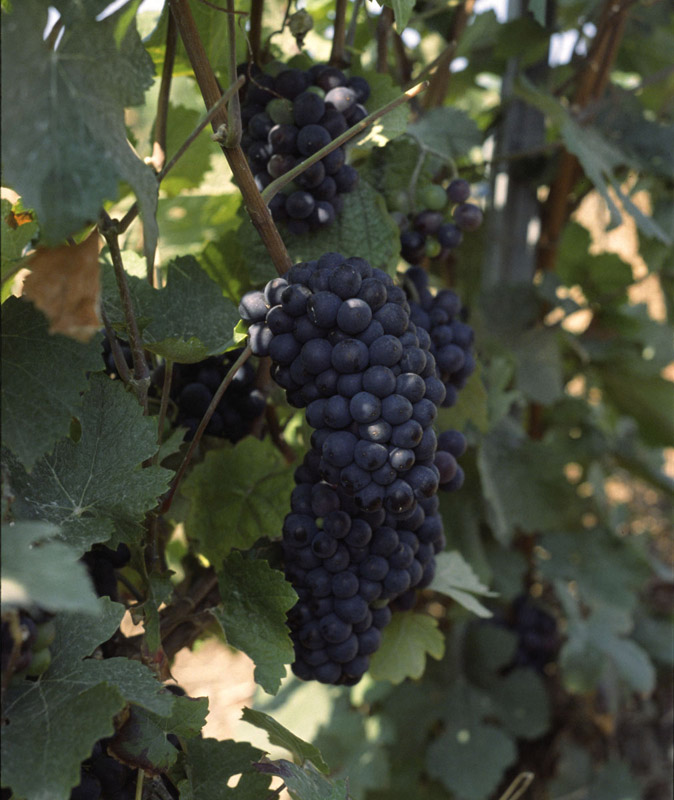
Pinot Meunier, a black grape widely used for white or rosé champagne

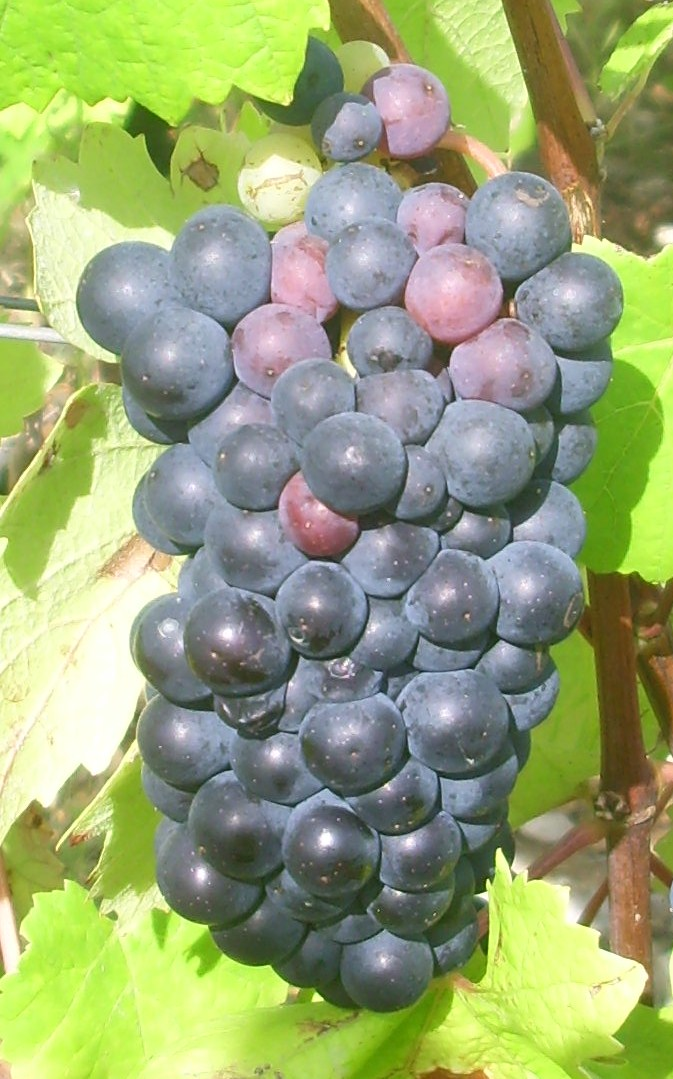
Pinot Noir, a black grape used for the production of white wine

== Components of the grape and the must ==
=== The stalk ===
The stalk (or rafle) is the herbaceous branch that bears the grapes. It consists of about 80% water, soluble minerals (nearly 3% with half of potassium) and polyphenols. The polyphenols are mainly tannins and are responsible for the bitter taste and the sensation of astringency. The phenolic compounds are at lower concentration in white wine than in red wine. In the production of a white wine, the stalk does not contain any useful part: its moisture can cause dilution and the presence of tannins is not desirable in the wine. This is why it is quickly isolated from the rest of the harvest, either by shaking or by pressing.

=== The grape berry ===
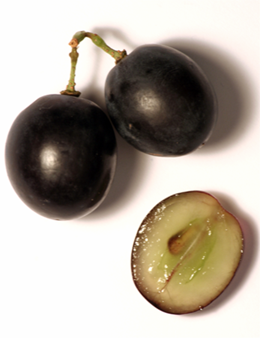
Section of a grape berry with white juice and colored skin

The grape berry is made of skin, flesh (or pulp), and seeds. The seeds are hard and are 2 to 5% by weight of the berry. The seeds contain 25-45% water, 34-36% carbohydrates, 13-20% fat (the grape seed oil), 4-6% tannins, 4-6.5% protein, 2-4% minerals, and 1% fatty acids. Their contribution in white wine is zero since they are removed in the pressing, in addition, the pressure is insufficient to extract anything from the seed.

The skin is 6-12% by weight of the grape. It is coated on the surface with Pruinescence, a waxy coating that gives a matte finish to the color of the grape and contains the yeast responsible for fermentation. The grape skin also contains volatile compounds in its deeper layers. These are responsible for the aroma of the grape and for the molecules that become the aroma of wine during fermentation: They are the "aroma precursors". In red grapes, the film also contains anthocyanins or colored matter, which is from bright to purplish red. To produce white wine from red grapes, it is necessary not to macerate the grapes, nor to press too hard on the harvest to avoid the dissolving of the anthocyanins in the grape juice. The skin contains a lot of cellulose, insoluble pectin and proteins, and organic acids: citric, malic, and tartaric acids. The skin of the Sauvignon blanc B grape has a pH of about 4.15. It also contains between 2 and 3% tannins.

The flesh of the grape is the most important part – it is between 75 and 85 percent of the weight of the grape. It consists of large polygonal cells which are thin-walled. With a low pressure the cells leak their contents. The flesh of the grape contains mainly water. The organic components are fermentable sugars (between 170-230 grams for a dry wine and between 200 and 300 grams per liter or even more for Fortified wines) and organic acids, especially malic acid and tartaric acid. Acids occur in larger amounts in the centre of the berry while the sugars are in greater proportion at the periphery. This heterogeneity in the distribution of sugars, acids, and inorganic compounds in the berry is used during pressing, especially in Champagne pressing. This process separates them as it happens and uses them to measure the progress of the "vintage", the first and second tailles, and finally the rebêches of insufficient quality to be made into AOC wine.

The flesh is the major element of the wine, as it is the part that contains the highest proportion of liquid. The flavors are much less present than in the skin.

=== The sugars ===
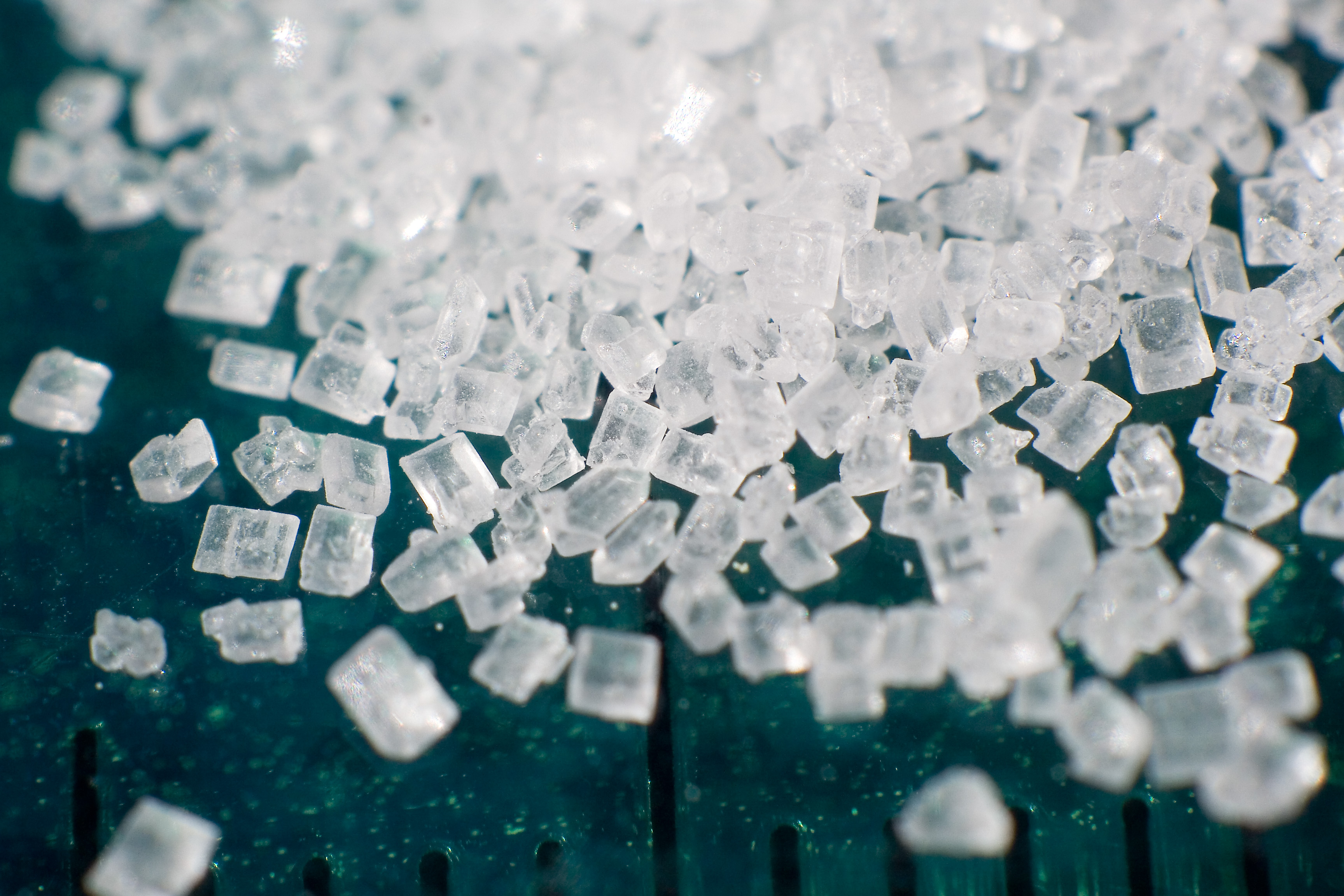
Crystals of refined sucrose (sugar used in Chaptalization)

Sugars are carbohydrates derived from photosynthesis. The sucrose is made in the leaves and flows into the plant, where it is broken down into glucose and fructose and accumulates in the berry, where it is a characteristic of the maturation of the grapes. Many different sugars coexist: the most common are glucose and fructose which will be consumed by anerobic yeast to convert it to alcohol during fermentation. They are in substantially equal amounts. To verify the completion of the fermentation they can be quantified by chemical assay (glucose and fructose are "reducing" sugars that react with an alkaline copper solution called Fehling's solution), an enzymatic method, or by infrared spectroscopy.

Other sugars are not fermentable at all. After consumption by the yeast, the ratio of non-fermentable sugars (the ones that are not consumed by yeast: arabinose and xylose) is between 0.5 and 1.7 grams per liter. Sugars exercise a control over the taste – they balance the spiciness of the acidity and the burning of the alcohol.

=== The organic acids ===
The "L" shape of tartaric acid which is the main organic acid in wine

The organic acids are mainly malic and tartaric acids. Tartaric acid is a characteristic of grapes; in its leaves, its content ranges from 5 to 7 grams per liter. Malic acid is present in green grapes, and its ratio decreases with maturation to give between 2 and 7 grams per liter at harvest. The range is very wide depending on the variety and soil with hot climates giving lower rates as the heat accelerates its degradation. There are many other acids in small quantities: citric acid, ascorbic acid, α-ketoglutaric, fumaric acid, galacturonic acid, coumaric acid, etc. Their variable quantity varies the pH of the juice. The must of white wine is generally more acidic than red grape must simply because the grape maturity is less advanced.

=== Vitamins ===
Vitamin C (or ascorbic acid) is present in the grape and the must up to 50 milligrams per liter. It is a protection in the juice against oxidation. In the presence of oxygen it produces hydrogen peroxide; by this reaction it deprives the enzymes in the juice of oxygen that is necessary to oxidize the wine. Since 1962 the addition of vitamin C in the wine has been allowed to a maximum of 15 grams per hectoliter at the time of packaging to stabilize the wine. Experiments in the late 2000s tried to determine a method to add it to fresh harvests or to the juice.

Vitamin B1 or thiamine is present at a concentration between 0.2 and 0.5 milligrams per liter. This vitamin is necessary for the proper growth of yeasts that ensure alcoholic fermentation. In the must of healthy grapes, the natural quantity is sufficient for the yeast. On the other hand, for a degraded harvest (by gray mold), the degradation of this vitamin leads the winemaker to add it to the must to ensure a trouble-free fermentation. In the case of a harvest with very clear juice and low temperature the yeast works in a limited way and the addition of thiamine can help avoid a difficult end of fermentation. Legislation limits the amount added to 30 milligrams per hectoliter.

=== The mineral elements ===
The juice also contains minerals. Sodium, Potassium, and Magnesium are most common. Potassium and also calcium can form salts with the tartaric acid: Potassium bitartrate and the neutral calcium tartrate at the pH of the wine. For these, when their solubility threshold is reached, they settle and contribute to de-acidify the juice. In the southern regions where acidity is sometimes a little lacking this may be a cause of failure of extra acidity.

== Winemaking ==
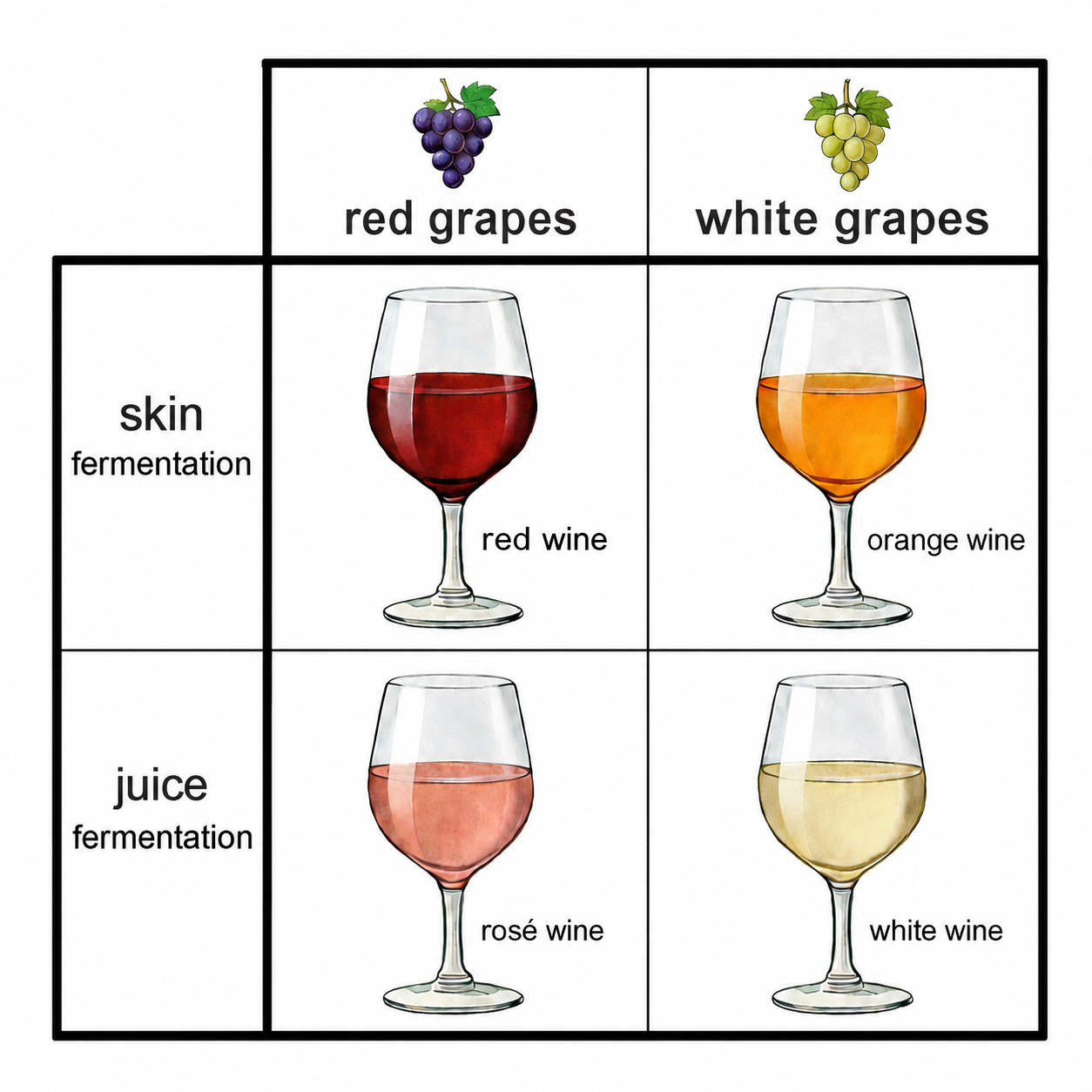
Simplified illustration of the four colors of wine – red wine, orange wine, rosé wine, white wine

White wine is made from white or black grapes (but always with white flesh; the grapes with colored flesh are called Teinturier, meaning colored juice). Once harvested, the grapes are pressed, and only the juice is extracted. The juice is then put into tanks for fermentation where sugar is transformed into alcohol by yeast present on the grapes.

=== The grape harvest ===
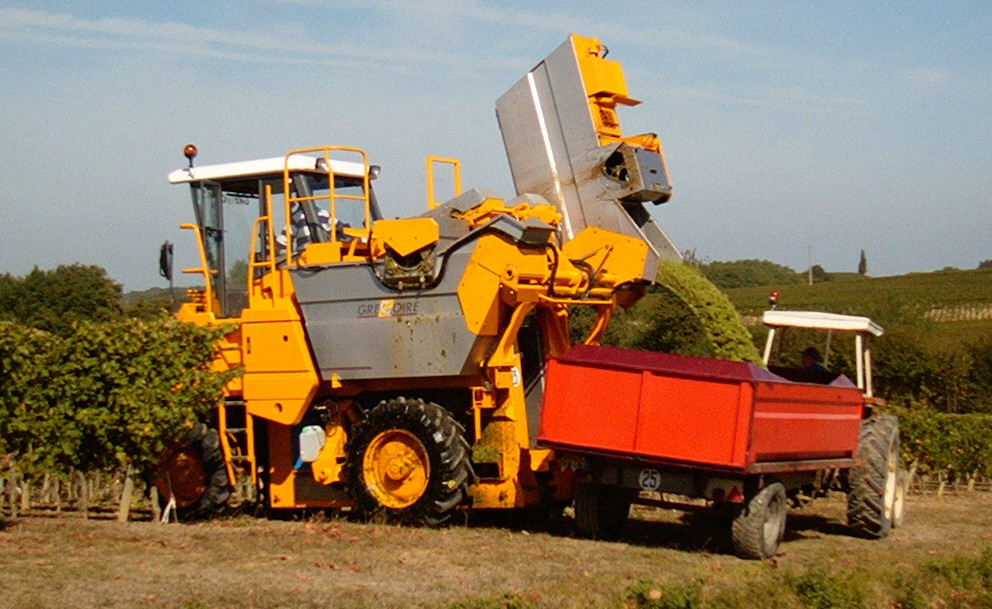
The harvest from the harvesting machine is emptied into a trailer.

Grape maturity depends on the requirement of the final product. For a sweet white wine, whether fortified or natural, sugar is the key criterion. For a dry white wine, technological maturity is calculated and the fruit is harvested just before (usually eight days) the maturity of the sugar. At this point the relationship between sugar and acid is optimal. Further, low acidity will cause the future wine to be unbalanced with excess alcohol and lack of liveliness. In addition, the flavor will be less fresh and less vivid.

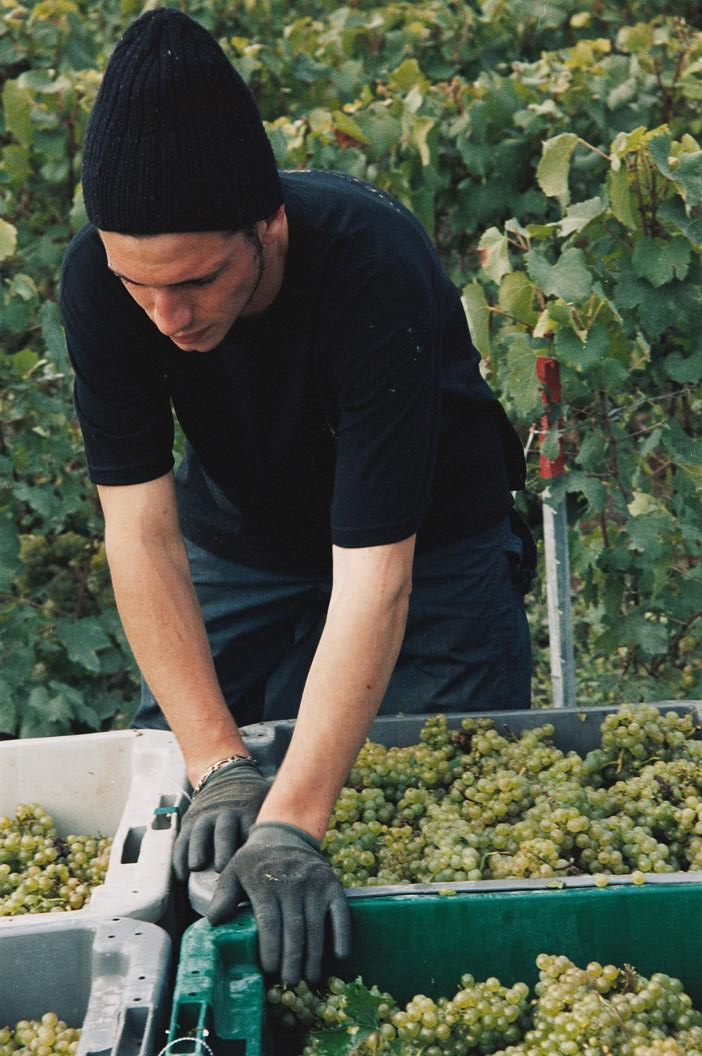
Manual harvest in Champagne

Traditional hand harvesting of whole bunches has been increasingly challenged by the harvesting machine for dry white wines, an economic choice but not always a qualitative one. The fragility of the grape requires either a rapid transfer to the winery or protection from oxidation. When the transport time between vine and winery is long, the harvest can be refrigerated and kept away from oxygen using nitrogen or dry ice.

However, for some sweet wines, a successful harvest requires manual work and training for pickers to pick only clusters where the berries have reached optimum ripeness or have been affected by noble rot (for the Sélection de Grains Nobles). Handpicking is recommended for sparkling wines and absolutely necessary for white wines from grapes with colored skin.

=== Treatments before fermentation ===
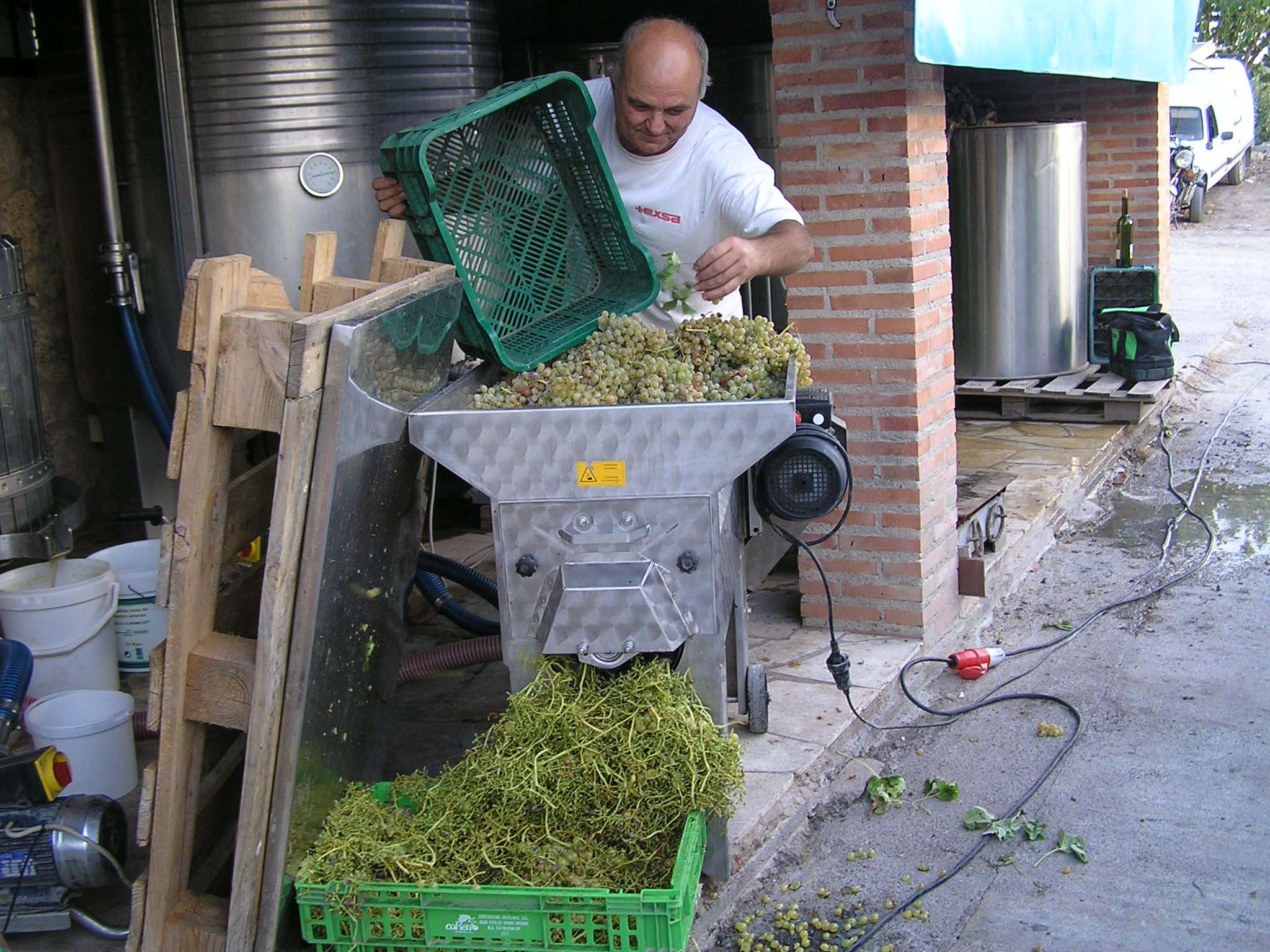
A small shaker for de-stemming

The first step in processing the grapes at the winery is to separate the components of the fruit that are needed from the unwanted parts. The process followed at this stage will determine the future quality of the wine. For this, the clusters are generally shaken then trampled. The practice of moderate trampling allows the grains to burst, releasing the juice and pulp (it cannot be used for white wine from black grapes because the premature bursting of the berries would cause a colored must). The practice of shaking or stalking has the advantage of separating the stems from the cluster of grapes and avoids giving the wine an herbaceous taste at pressing. The skin is not macerated and the transparent yellow color is retained.

The winemaker can soak the skins of white grapes and practice maceration if the quality of the grapes is good. Pre-fermentation Maceration is generally performed at a controlled temperature to delay the onset of fermentation. This technique improves the extraction of varietal aromas and their precursors which are mainly located in the skin. Acidity decreases as does the ratio of Colloids (large pectin type molecules) and aging potential. To be implemented, this process requires a perfect de-stalking, moderate crushing and sulfite to protect the juice from oxidation. The duration (typically 5 to 18 hours at 18 °C (64 °F)) depends on the variety, the temperature of maceration, the maturity of the grape, and the quality of the soil.

=== The wine press ===
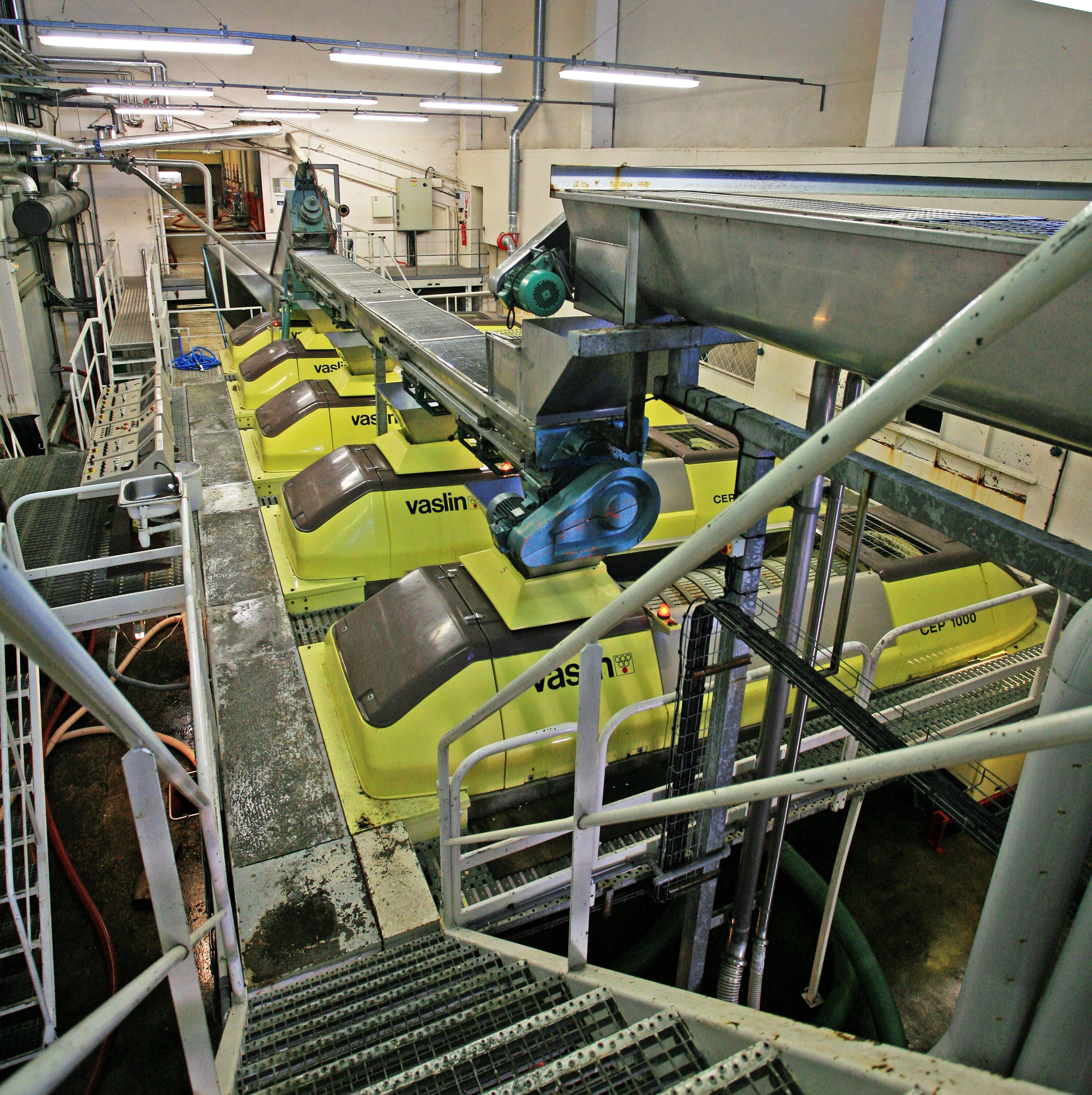
Battery of wine presses

The trampled and de-stemmed harvest is then pressed. The type of wine press also affects the potential quality of the wine. Since the 1980s, pneumatic presses have improved the work involved by working in airtight conditions and allowing a fine control of the pressure to extract the juice without damaging the grapes. The juice or moût de goutte (Must of Drops) is the juice that flows naturally from the berries crushed under their own weight prior to pressing (on the way to the press). Trampling increases its proportion and makes the material profitable by processing a higher tonnage of grapes at the same time. The moût de presse ("must of the press") is the juice flowing from the press from the pressure on the grapes. It concentrates the grape's qualities or defects: It is rich in aromas, colloids, or phenolic compounds. However, it can also be marked by olfactory defects, such as the smell of fungus on spoiled grapes or the vegetable smell of a harvest with insufficient maturity. The blending or not of the moût de goutte and the moût de presse musts and release depends on the health of the grapes, the method of pressing, and the style of wine intended. Manipulation of the grape before pressing increases the amount of lees and complicates pressing. For the development of a quality wine, their use is excluded or very limited.

=== The settling ===
The settling is intended to clarify the juice by removing the lees from it. The lees are colloids in suspension, debris from the skins or pulp, and exogenous debris (soil). Static settling consists of leaving the must to let the debris settle: after pressing, the must is left to stand in a tank away from air. Suspended particles precipitate to the bottom of the tank. This is facilitated by the addition of pectolytic enzymes which are long chain carbons composed of pectic compounds. These pectins give a high viscosity to the juice, cut the suspended particles into shorter chains, and accelerate precipitation. Refrigeration of the juice is needed: if fermentation starts, the release of bubbles of carbon dioxide would spread suspended particles throughout the juice preventing their deposition. After the juice is clarified it is decanted for fermenting. Dynamic settling is performed with a machine that accelerates the separation of the juice from the lees. The centrifuge removes the largest particles but does not achieve a high level of clarity. Settling by flotation is a technique where the introduction of a gas at the bottom of the tank creates bubbles which cause the particles to rise to the surface where they are removed by a scraper. Filtration with a rotary vacuum filter is relatively slow but effective. It is often used to recover clear juice in the lees exiting the centrifuge.

In addition enzyme treatment can improve the settling of the Finings. Bentonite plays a mechanical role of ballast to settle the colloids – it accelerates the sedimentation rate. Gelatin is also used to flocculate the suspended tannins extracted by the press. Often associated with a bitter taste, their removal is generally beneficial for white wine. Polyvinylpolypyrrolidone or "PVPP" allows the fixing of polyphenols and eliminating them. These molecules are responsible for the browning of wine and their removal gives an element of stability in the future drink.

In the "stabilization of lees" (liquid cold stabilization) the winemaker regularly adds lees in suspension for several days so they do not settle immediately. He then proceeds to a conventional settling as indicated above. This technique allows the enrichment of the juice with precursors of "thiol" (passion fruit, citrus ...) which are naturally very soluble in the juice and are particularly suitable for some varieties such as Sauvignon and Colombard. In the "maceration of lees", the lees from the static settling are gathered in a refrigerated tank and agitated for several days. After filtration and fermentation they give a white wine also rich in thiols.

Five stages of making Muscadet

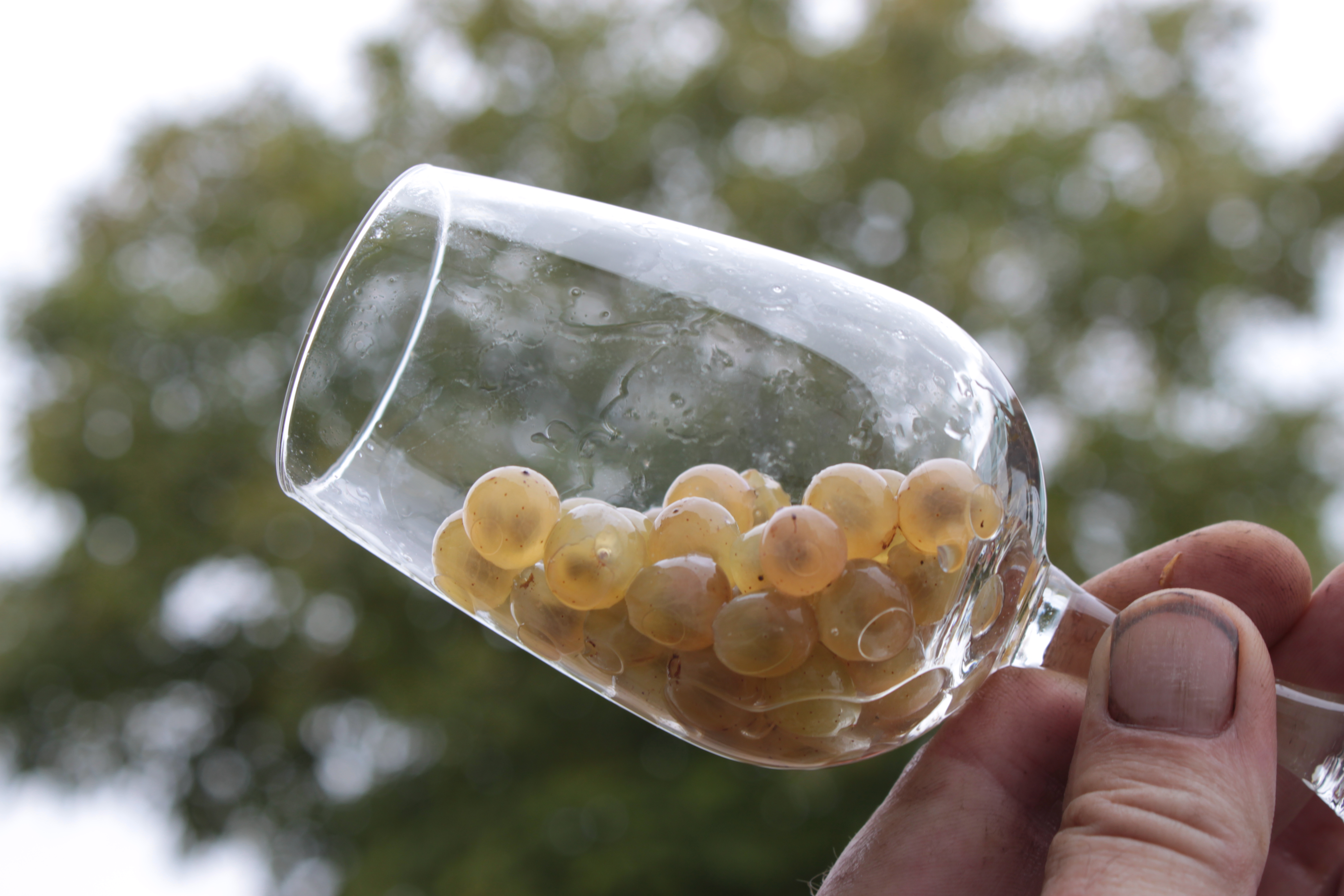
Step 1: grape berries

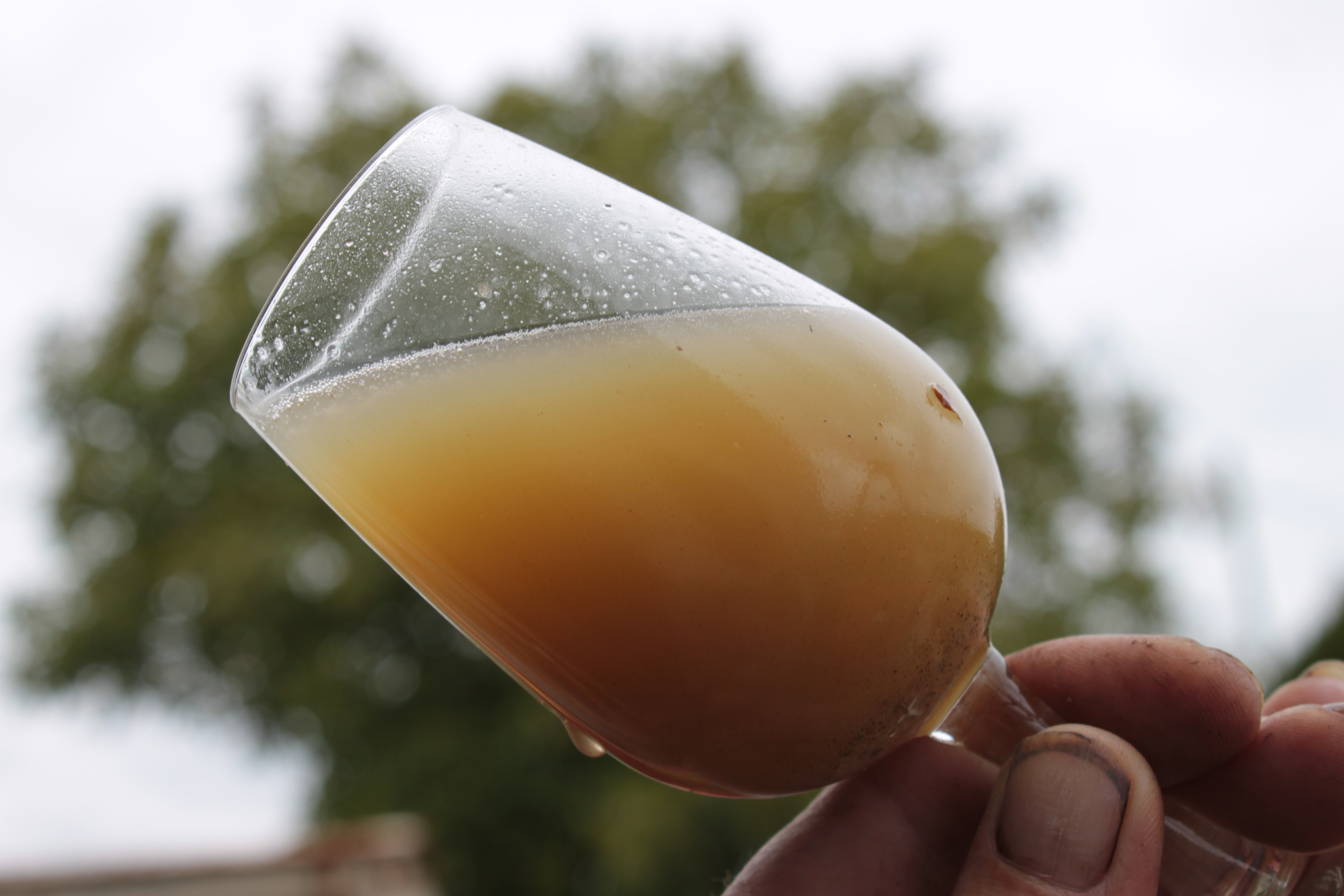
Step 2: grape juice

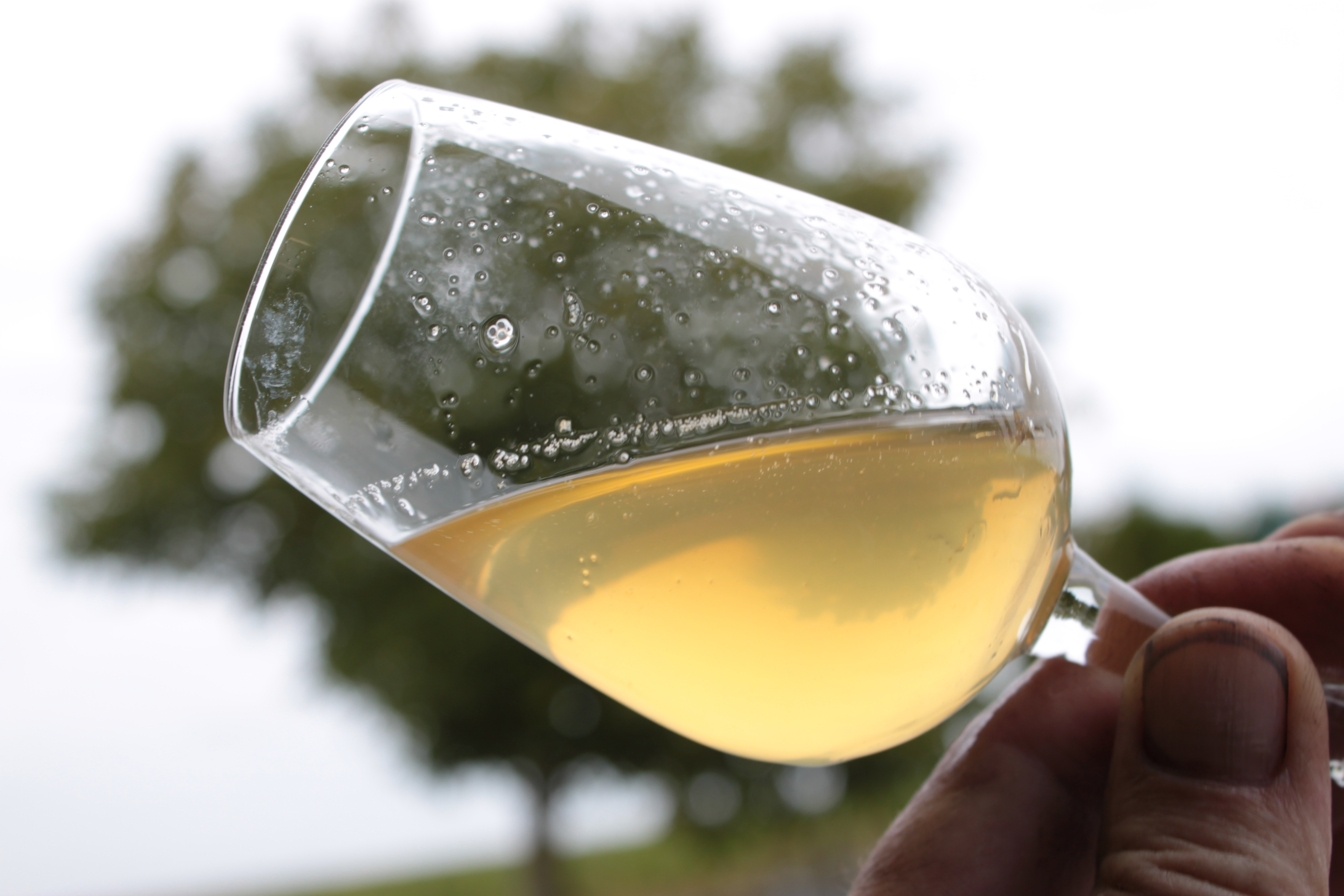
Step 3: juice, filtered, not decanted.

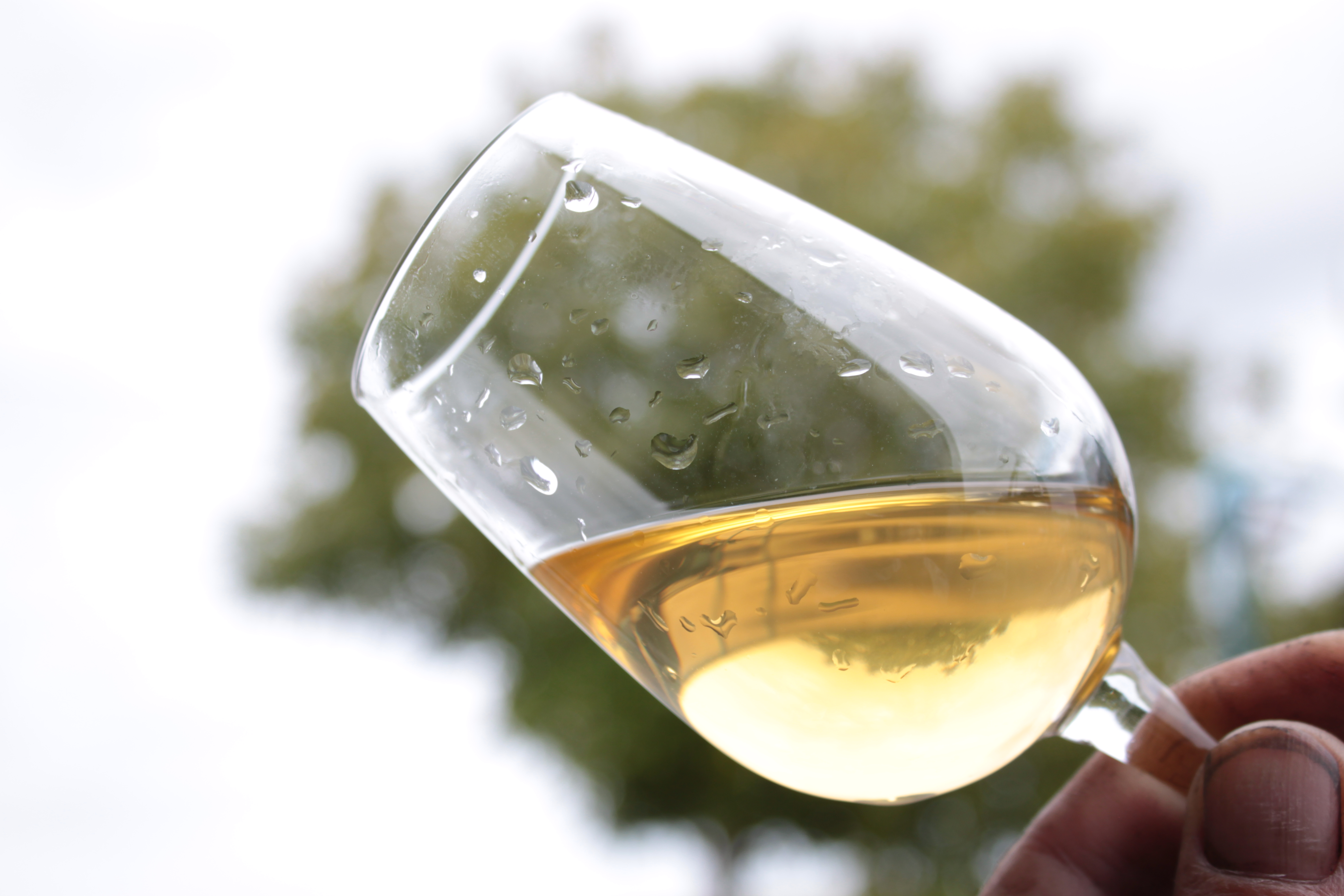
Step 4: juice, filtered and decanted.

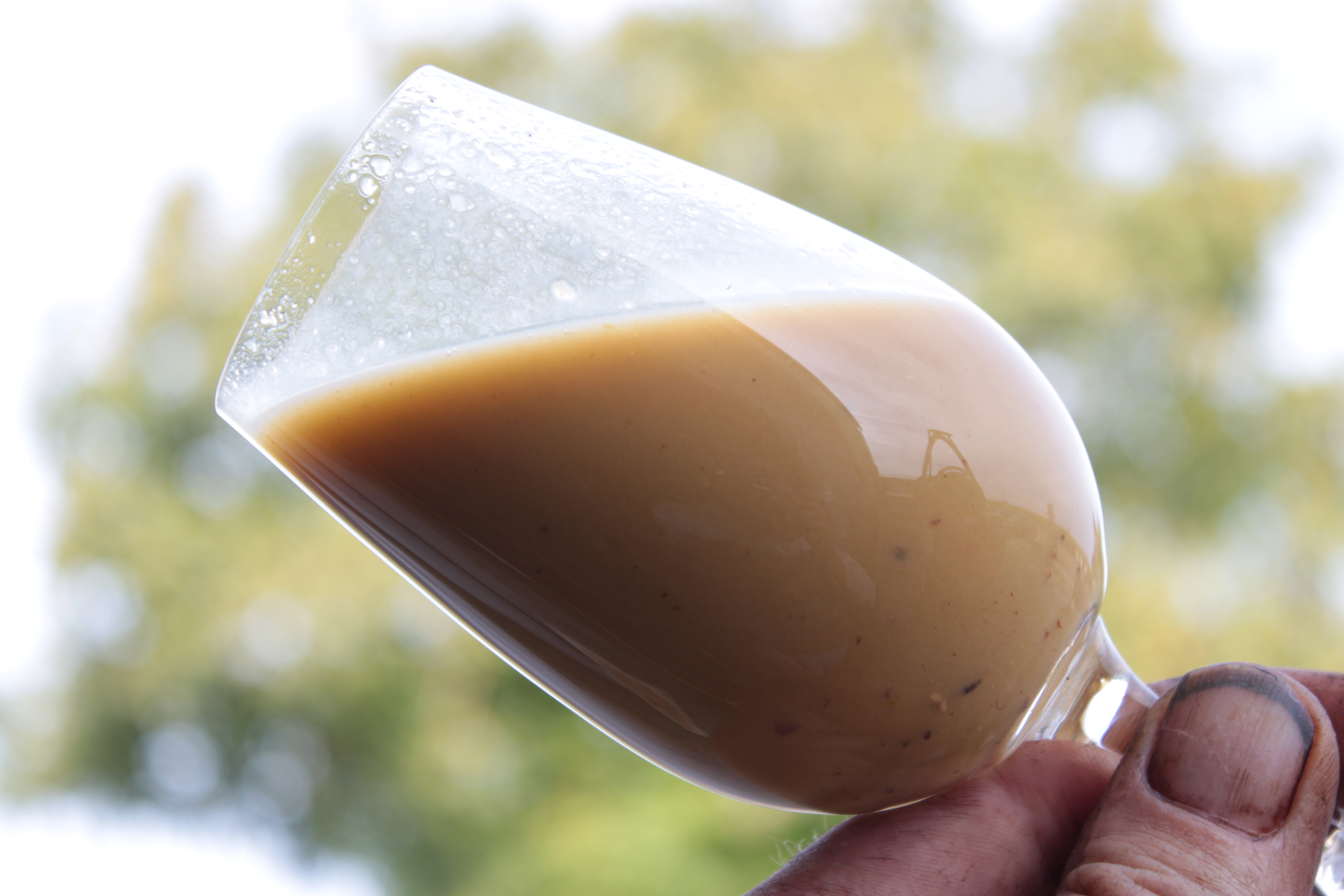
Step 5: the lees: to be filtered.

=== The making of the wine ===
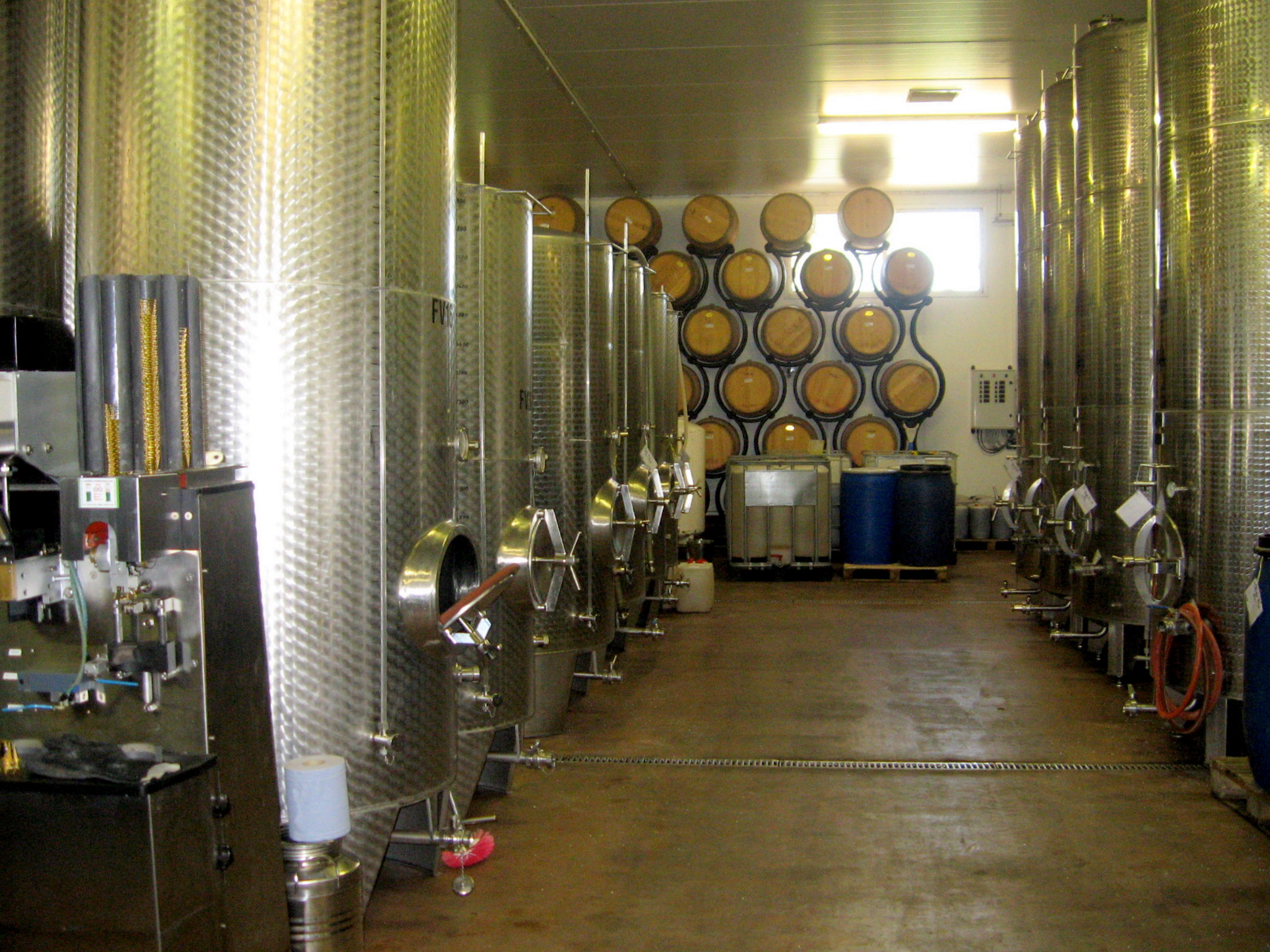
Fermentation in stainless steel tanks in the UK

The juice is then placed in a tank to undergo fermentation. These fermentation tanks can be of several types: oak, cement coated with epoxy, stainless or enamelled steel, or epoxy resin. For large volume tanks the control of temperature, which typically is around 18 °C, becomes necessary. The majority of aromatic components (acetates of alcohol and ethyl esters of fatty acids) are synthesized by the yeast during fermentation of light juice below 18 °C. However, clarity and low temperatures are factors which slow fermentation. Recourse to the addition of selected yeasts for these difficult working conditions becomes crucial. In contrast some producers grow their vines organically or biodynamically: the lees are of good quality without synthetic chemicals harmful to yeast so they are kept in the wine. Turbidity of the must ensures a good supply of yeasts and fermentation in small tanks or in barrels then does not require mastery of cold.

Fermentation starts spontaneously under the action of the natural yeasts from the grapes. The winemaker can choose to use a commercially available active dry yeast. It can help to express the characteristics of a variety or a method of manufacture. For a dry white wine fermentation continues until the sugar runs out. The wine is then usually decanted to eliminate the lees. When fermentation is done in barrels the temperature often exceeds 20 °C or even 25 °C.

After the end of fermentation, the wine may also have malolactic fermentation or FML. This second fermentation carried out by bacteria deacidifies the wine: it transforms the malic acid, which has two carboxyl groups, into lactic acid. This operation, which reduces the biting acidity of the wine, is not always desirable nor practiced. In southern areas the acidity is carefully preserved to give the wine its liveliness for refreshing aroma of wine. During the fermentation of the grapes, varietal aromas are reduced in favor of an increase in roundness and volume in the mouth of the wine during aging in oak barrels. It gives a better biological stability in champagne wines.

For a sweet wine, fermentation is stopped before its end to keep some of the sugar: this is the Mutage (fortification). The fermentation can be stopped by adding sulfur dioxide (SO_{2}) (sterilization of wine), by sudden cooling (anesthesia of yeasts), by sterile filtration (capturing the yeasts in a very fine mesh filter), or a combination of several of these methods. A rule of thumb for determining the point of mutage, which allows a good balance of acquired alcohol and residual sugar, is to leave as many potential degrees as the degrees acquired over 10% by volume. (Note: For example: for a must with a potential measure of 16% vol, the mutage will be when the fermentation produces 13% vol of alcohol and there will remain 3% vol potential in the form of sugar: so 3 × 16.83 = 50 grams of sugar L to the power of -1) For sweeter dessert wines fermentation stops spontaneously by excess sugar and alcohol: Alcohol is waste from the yeast and it is poisonous in large doses. In the case of sweet wines an addition of wine alcohol stops the fermentation. FML is not done for sweet wines as the lactic bacteria preferentially degrades sugar which would give a lactic bite (sweet and sour wine). In addition, the balance of acidity and sugar in the wine supports vivacity.

A winemaking technique called "reducing" or "technology" has been developed. Very fashionable in Australia and New Zealand, this technique seeks highly aromatic white wines and is very interesting on aromatic varieties such as Sauvignon B, Colombard B, and Riesling B, although less so for varieties such as Chardonnay B. It works by limiting premature oxidation in the must or the wine at all stages of development. The use of inert gases such as carbon dioxide (CO_{2}) isolates the grapes from oxygen from the air, and cold partially inhibits the action of oxidative enzymes in the must. Tyrosinase, a natural enzyme in the grape, and laccase, an enzyme coming from the gray mold, are very active in oxidation. Laccase can be eliminated by sorting the grapes. Strong limitation on the amount of polyphenols in the wine by reducing the time between harvest and pressing is another technique that aims to make a very light wine, protected from yellowing.

== Preparation of wine before packaging ==
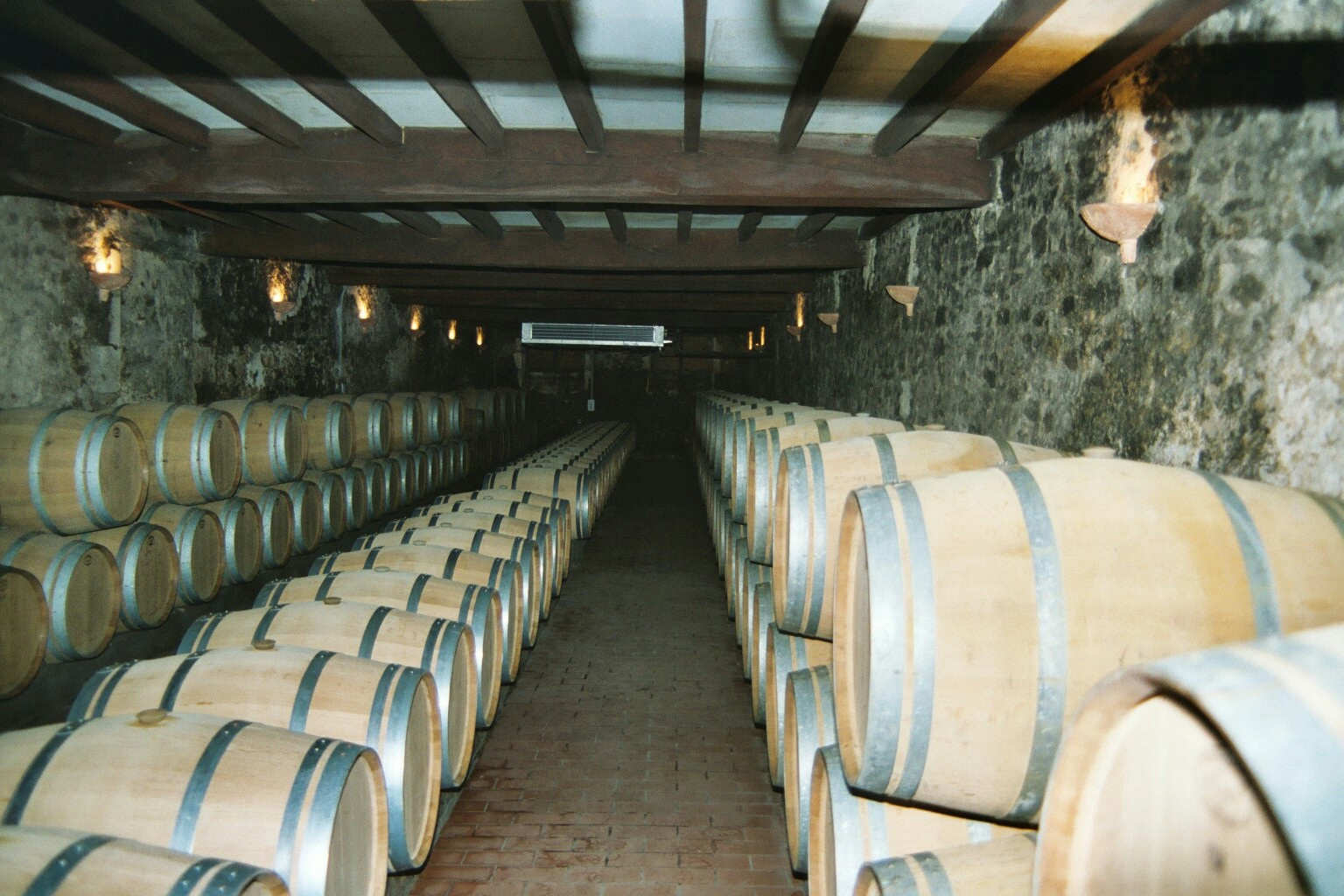
A Wine warehouse aging sweet white wine (Sauternes)

After fermentation all wine requires constant care to be fit for consumption. All of these practices before bottling are known as élevage or Maturing.

=== Maturing ===
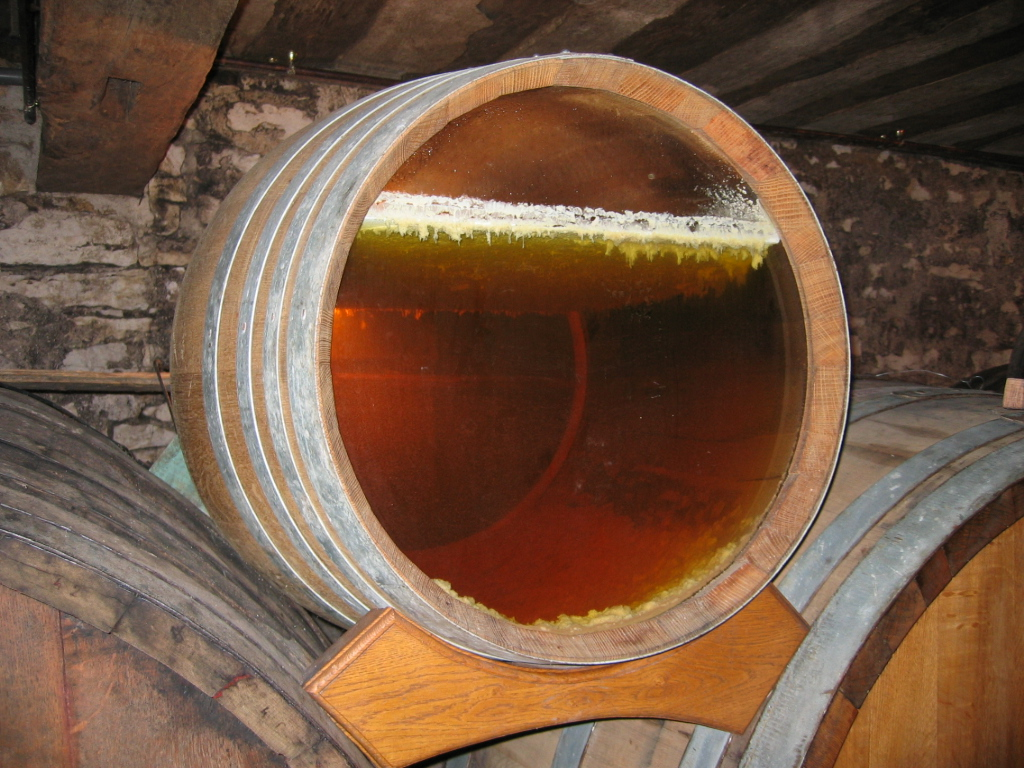
Aging vin jaune under a layer of yeast

Maturing can be done in a vat. It takes little time to clarify and to prepare the packaging (bottling or Bag-In-Box) but this may be extended by maturing of lees. This type of maturing consists of regularly adding fine lees in suspension in the wine. The dead yeast is used for the fine lees which digests itself (autolysis) giving the wine volume and body to support the fruitiness. This operation is called Bâtonnage or stirring and is traditionally done with a stick to agitate the lees at the bottom of the barrel. This technique needs to be well controlled, however, otherwise the wine may take on a Goût de réduit (Reduced taste) due to the activity of reductase sulfite from the yeast. This operation can be done in vats, as in Muscadet, barrels as in Burgundy and many chardonnays, or bottles as in champagne.

Maturing can also be done in barrels. The wine is put in barrels after fermentation but fermentation itself may also occur in the barrel. The barrel has a dual role: it flavors the wine giving it a scent of toast, butter, and vanilla but it also helps to mature it by providing a very small regular quantity of oxygen through the wooden walls. This oxygen helps to polymerize the components of the wine making it less aggressive and more balanced.

=== Blending ===
The blending consists of mixing different wines in order to obtain the desired final blend. This assembly can be of varietals (in the case of Bordeaux wines or wines from the Languedoc-Roussillon), or blending of a vintage with varieties (in the case of champagne).

This blending may be purely quantitative: various vintages can be blended to achieve the desired volume. It can also be qualitative; the taster or a team of tasters (cellar master, winemaker, owner of the estate, etc.) determine the amount of each wine to mix together in the final blend to obtain optimum quality. In winemaking blending is always empirical, it cannot be predicted that the combination of two or more vintages will give the expected product. The only secure values are analytical values (alcoholic strength, acidity, pH, etc.).

=== Clarification ===
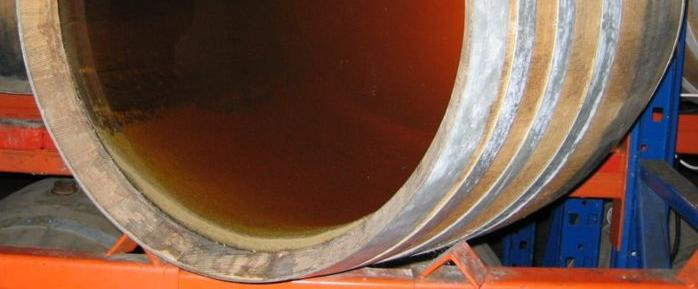
Deposit of lees at the bottom of a barrel

Clarification consists of removing insoluble particles in suspension in the water-alcohol solution that is the wine and stabilization is to maintain the solubility of the elements dissolved in the wine throughout the retention period in the bottle and consumption at the table.

To clarify wine, it is necessary to wait for particle deposition at the bottom of the wine container, but this can be accelerated by the use of enological adhesives. These additives bind to the insoluble particles and fall to the bottom.

Tannic acid (or gallotannic) C76-H52-O46 is used for the clarification of white wine, using casein, gelatin, or Isinglass.

=== Stabilization ===
The majority of wine components are dissolved in the wine: certain components, however, may take an insoluble form during aging or storage of wine – this is the case with tartaric acid. A salt containing potassium, potassium bitartrate is in the form of crystals at the bottom of the bottle. This is a natural phenomenon but many producers seek to avoid this as dealers and uninformed consumers take these crystals as a fault. It is caused or accelerated by cold storage: low temperature reduces its solubility. The habit of refreshing white wine makes this wine particularly sensitive to this phenomenon.

Several solutions are available to stabilize the wine:

The first is to cool the wine to a negative temperature near freezing for several weeks. (Note: The freezing temperature of wine is approximately half of its alcohol content by volume, expressed as a negative value. For example, a wine of 10% by volume freezes around –5°C, a wine of 12% by volume at around –6°C) The potassium bitartrate crystals precipitate and can be removed by filtration prior to packaging in bottles or bag-in-boxes. This solution is costly in refrigeration energy and can negatively affect the organoleptic qualities of the wine.

Another solution is to introduce Metatartaric acid, a tartaric acid polymer, into the wine. Its mode of action is still unknown but it prevents microscopic crystals from growing. However, the effect is not sustainable in the long term (between 6 and 18 months) because it hydrolyzes when warm.

A third way is electrodialysis: an electric current between two plates attracts the wine ions and eliminates them. However, this solution not only acts on tartaric acid but also other compounds especially potassium which is responsible for the formation of insoluble bitartrate and also modifies the organoleptic qualities. However, it does allow a definitive stabilization. Reports of high tartaric stability in white wines matured on lees has led to research in this area. A protein from the hydrolyzate of the yeast (mannoproteins) allows salts of tartar to keep their solubility. The addition of this compound industrially permits a good quality stabilization. This solution is the least expensive for energy and refrigeration equipment and does not alter the aromatic perception of wine. Nevertheless, tests conducted by the Cooperative Institute for Wine of Languedoc-Roussillon did not show conclusive effectiveness.

Finally the study of the addition of cellulose gum or carboxymethylcellulose (CMC) conducted in recent years led to its approval in 2009 (EC Regulation 606/2009).

Some producers who sell their own products directly to the consumer, explain these natural phenomena to the customer who then serve the wine gently in order to prevent the crystals forming in the bottom of the bottle.

The presence of unstable proteins that can create a visual problem (protein breakdown) in the wine also requires stabilization. Treatment with bentonite allows the precipitation of unstable proteins which can then be removed by filtration and extraction. The proteins can also react with Metatartaric acid added to wine to prevent tartaric precipitation: the wine then loses its shine and becomes opalescent like whey. Some varieties are naturally high in protein (muscat. ..) but levels also vary depending on the vintage and maturity levels.

Finally some white wines can be victims of Rosissement (pinking). This phenomenon manifests itself in a light rosé coloration of the wine and takes the appearance of a "stained" wine or one that is contaminated by the presence of anthocyanins from red wine. Yet this is not so: the phenomenon is due to the presence of a normally colorless dissolved polyphenol which turns pink due to oxidation. An infusion of PVPP generally eliminates the substrate of oxidation. Some varieties are particularly sensitive to pinking: Sauvignon B, Viognier, Grenache B...

=== Use of SO_{2} ===
SO_{2}, sulfur dioxide or dioxide of sulfur is used in all winemaking operations from harvesting to packaging. It plays a protective role in the wine against the phenomena of oxidation, oxidase enzyme action (enzymes that oxidize the polyphenols in wine), and the control of microbial populations in yeasts and bacteria (antiseptic effect).

The maximum allowable doses depend on the sugar content of the wine: the residual sugar is susceptible to attack by microorganisms which would cause a restart of fermentation. In France the dose is limited to 150 mg/liter for Vin de Pays (country wines), 185 mg/L for Sparkling wines, 200 mg/L for Fortified wines, 200 mg/L for dry white wines, 250 mg/L for white wines with residual sugar greater than 5 g/liter (Moelleux wines), and 300 mg/L for liquoreux sweet wines.

=== Filtration and conditioning ===
For sale to individuals or restaurants the wine is filtered if necessary, then conditioned. The filtration consists of passing the wine through a filter element for retaining fine particles suspended in the wine. It may be fine earth (Kieselguhr), cardboard sheets, membranes, or Cross-flow filtration.

Packaging wine has historically varied. In one early method, wine merchants kept their stock in barrels or casks and the client would fill their pitcher or bottle. Glass bottles revolutionized the wine industry. The absence of transfer and thus contact with the oxygen in the air has made a significant improvement to the quality of the product. Other containers have emerged: aluminum cans, Tetra Pak cartons, plastic bottles, and the bag-in-box. Their quality is in their chemical inertness in relation to wine and their hermetic character against oxygen.

The wine bottle has been given certain shapes dedicated to wine. The most emblematic is the bottle of sparkling wine: because of the pressure inside it is a fairly thick glass. Many countries have adopted this shape for bottles of white wine – a more streamlined form than red wine bottles.

== Wine tasting ==
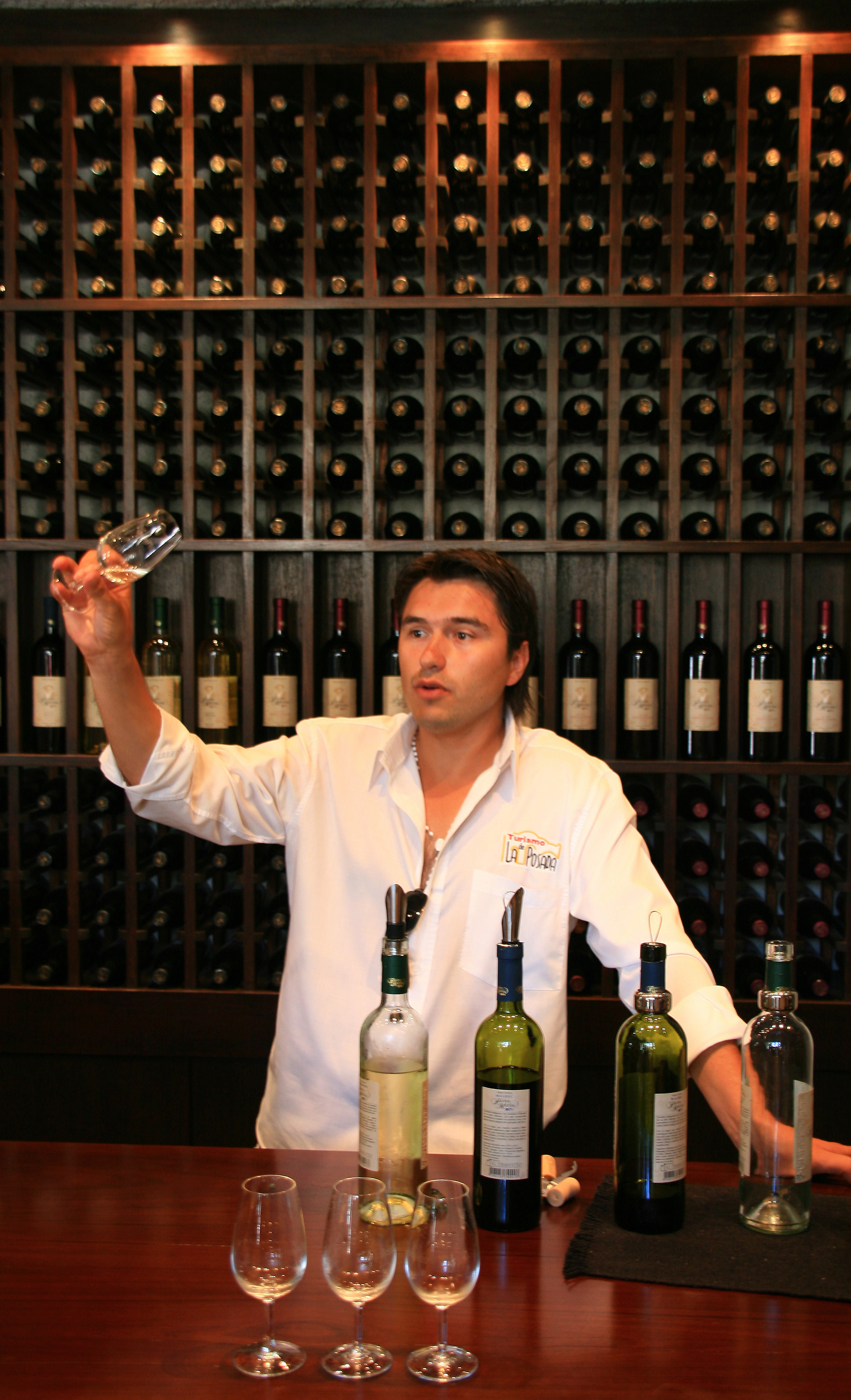
Torrontés wine tasting in Cafayate, Argentina

=== Color ===
The color of white wine is as varied as the types of wines. The term most commonly cited is yellow. However, the richness of vocabulary leaves free space for visual analysis between the actual color and the hue (the range of color is often different at the joint between the wine and the glass).

At the end of the 20th century the components of the wine which made the color were still not clearly identified. Over the ages, the flavones in the grapes were considered responsible for the yellow color, but their very low dissolution in wine, due to short maceration, led to a search for other molecules. A thesis by Biau in 1995 alluded to the influence of polysaccharides, proteins, and some phenolic acids.

Léglise specified that: "the term gold is used if the appearance is very bright and full of reflections, in the definition of the various nuances specific to the metal (...) If, with proper clarity, the wine does not shed light and does not radiate reflection, we will give only the term yellow". On a color scale white wine can be almost colorless white. When young it usually takes on a pale greenish or pale yellow tint. Its yellow color darkens with age and maturing becoming gold, then copper, and finally amber. One of the darkest wines in the world is achieved with a white grape: the Pedro Ximenez. The ratio of sugar also affects the color of the wine, making the color more sustained, depending on the nature of the grape varietal: A Bordeaux Sauvignon blanc or a Muscadet Melon have a greenish tint while Chardonnay or Traminer grown and vinified under comparable conditions will be yellow.

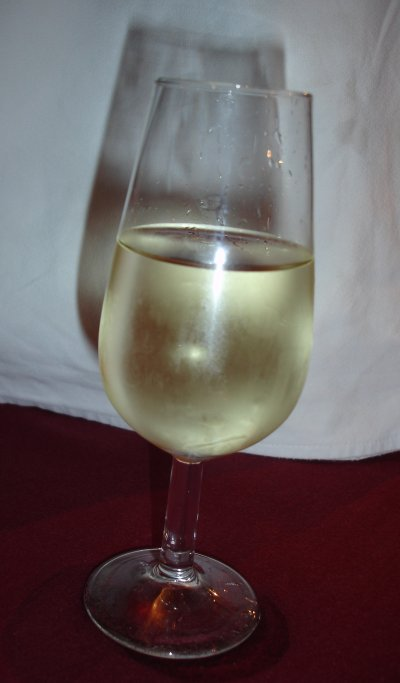
Glass of catavino (Sherry)

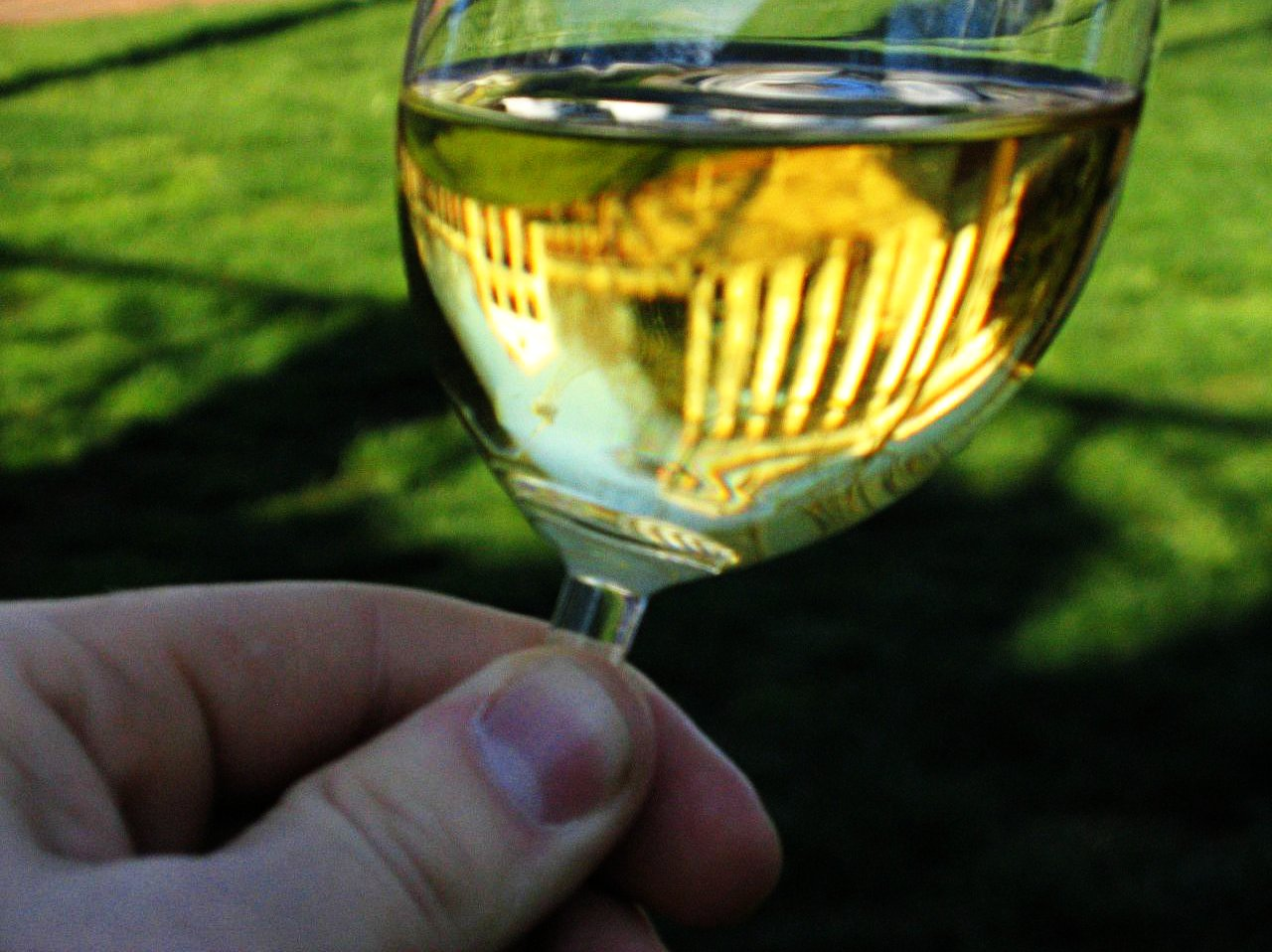
Chardonnay

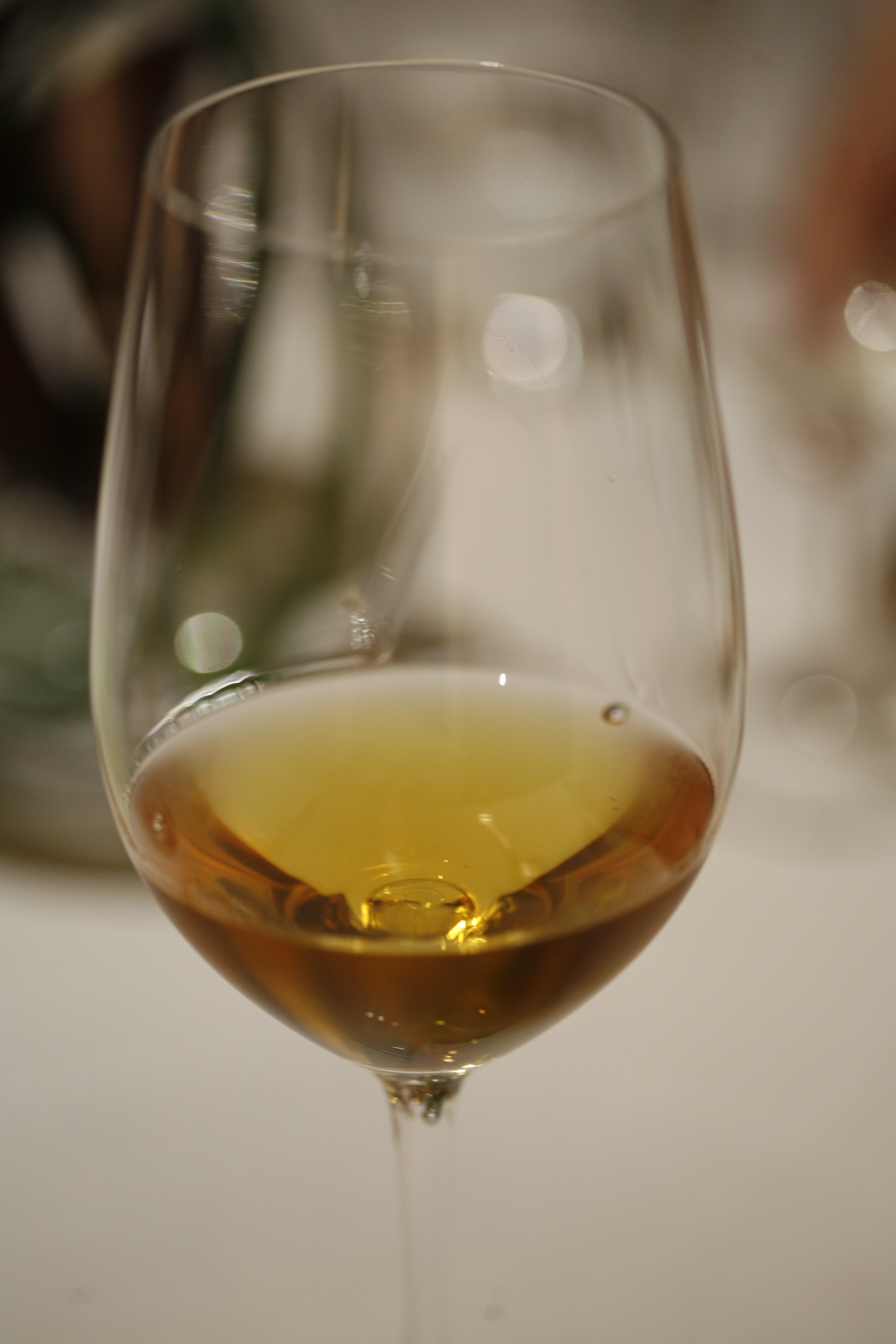
Glass of Tokaji

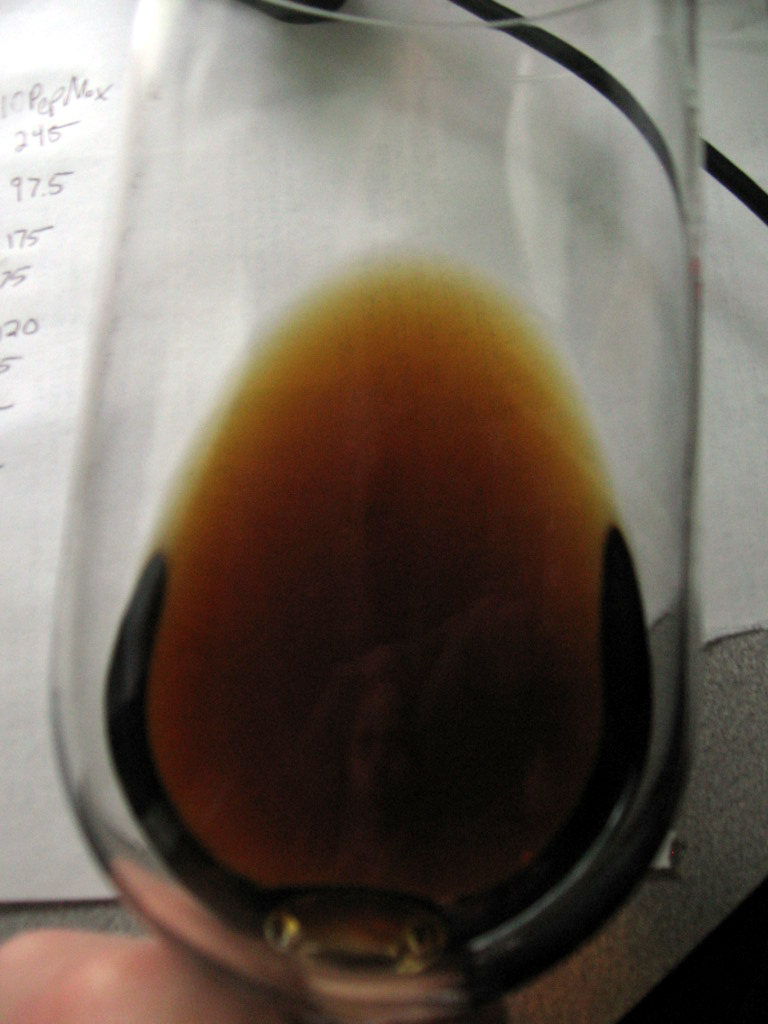
Aged white wine (Madeira)

=== Aromas ===
The aromas from white wine cover almost the whole palette of wine aromas.

The fruity aromas include citrus fruit such as lemon and grapefruit, white fruit such as apple, quince, peach and apricot, and nuts such as walnut and hazelnut. Exotic fruits are also present: pineapple, mango, and lychee. Obviously the aromatic palette includes these cooked flavors: apple, jam, candied fruit, etc. White wines may also convey floral aromas of acacia, honeysuckle, verbena, violet, etc.. (Scents of honey can also be assimilated).

Aging also brings other flavors to the wine. Barrel aging creates scents of vanilla, butter, brioche, toast, caramel, etc. The long maturing wines like yellow wine or sherry have typical aromas of fresh walnuts, almonds, and hazelnuts.

Finally the soil can impart a flavor characteristic of a region. Thus, the mineral aromas of flint (odor of flint or of light stone) well expressed in Chardonnay B and sauvignon B, and the scent of oil is typical of old Alsatian Rieslings B.

Same aromas that may be thought to be confined to red wines are found in white wines. This is the case especially in some white champagne wines partly made from black grapes and reminiscent of red fruit (strawberry, raspberry, blueberry, gooseberry, etc.).

=== Taste ===
The balance of white wine is no longer based only on alcohol and acidity because the tannic structure is removed: this is the factor that explains the difficulty of making a white wine. For sweet and fortified white wines the presence of sugar adds a parameter to balance the alcohol and acidity. Maturing in the barrel gives wine a wooded touch and tannins from the oak give it structure. The strongest wines, as in some grand crus of Sauternes (Château d'Yquem for example) even support aging in new wood.

=== Glasses for white wine ===
Specialized glasses for each type of wine were created. Many glasses specific to white wine exist in many wine-producing regions. The glass must be perfectly clear and colorless to properly appreciate the color of the wine. However, designers and manufacturers of tableware have created white wine glasses with green or blue feet. These colors are meant to flatter the wine – they give an artificial color in the shade (a reflection barrier which stress the separation between the glass and the wine) – rejuvenating the perceived impression.

Sparkling wines are served in particular glasses such as the flute and the coupe. The flute is the preferred glass for professional tasters: the shape concentrates the aromas to the nose of the taster and its height allows appreciation of the fine bubbles that rise to the surface. The coupe is not recommended because of its too flared shape: it does not preserve the layer of foam, and the gas and aromas escape too fast. According to legend, this type of glass was developed based on the shape of the Breast of the Marquise de Pompadour. The coupe dates from a time when the wines were mostly sweeter and less aromatic. Since the 1930s and with the habit to consume drier sparkling wines, the flute has taken the place of the coupe. The coupe is also used in mixtures which have an olive in a bubbly cocktail and in the spectacular pyramids of glasses that crown festivities.

Besides this range of glasses, the work of a team of tasters, including Jules Chauvet of the INAO in France, led to the creation in 1970 of the INAO glass. This glass has a thin glass wall and curve calculated to be able to taste all wines. This glass is used, among others, during the approval tastings – the gateway for the wines to be entitled to bear the name of an appellation d'origine contrôlée (AOC). This simple but elegant glass can also be used to serve wine at the table.

White wine glasses generally are taller and thinner than red wine glasses.

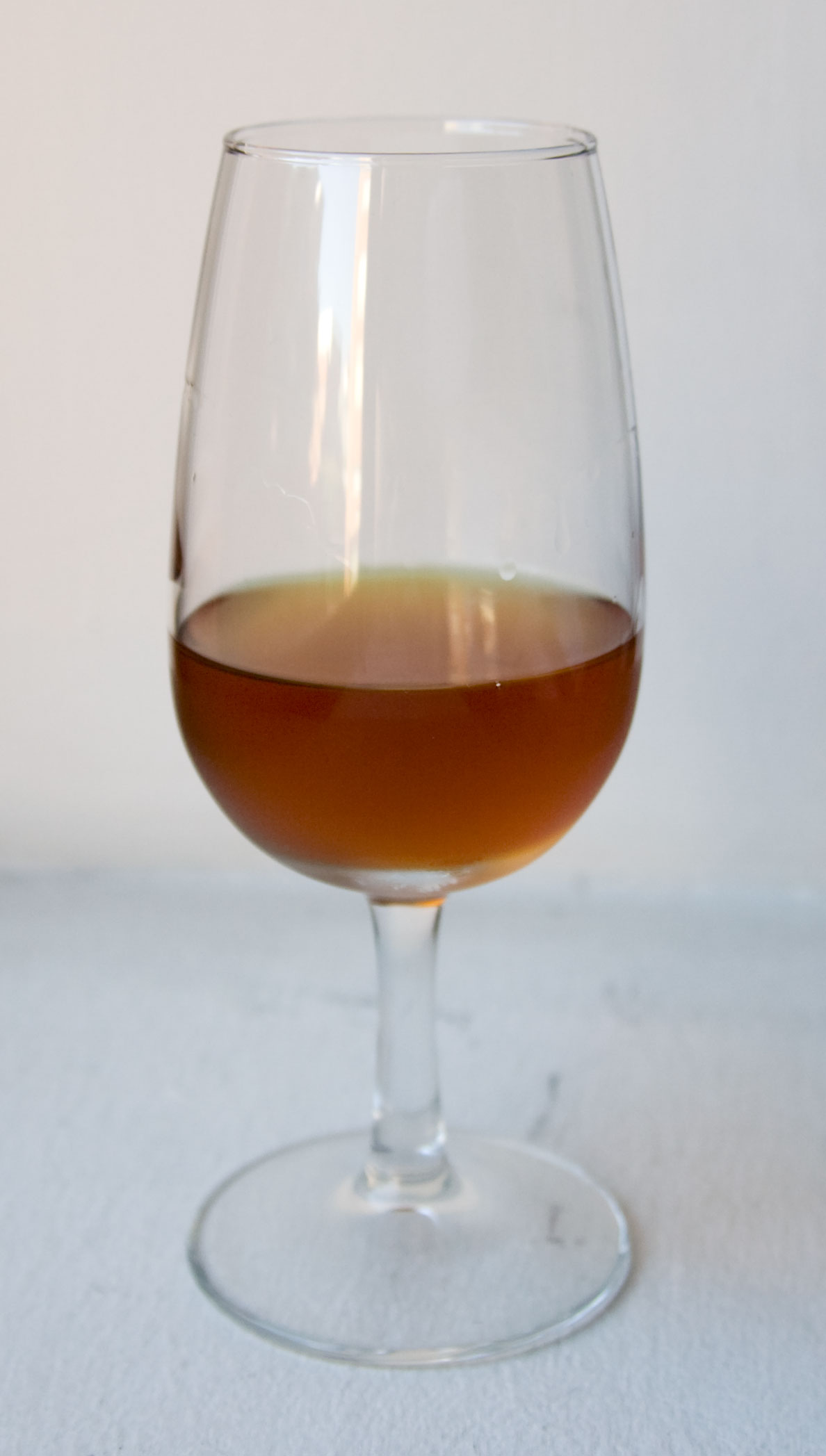
INAO glass of sherry amontillado

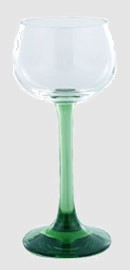
Alsatian glass: the colored foot is not recommended to properly assess the color of the wine.

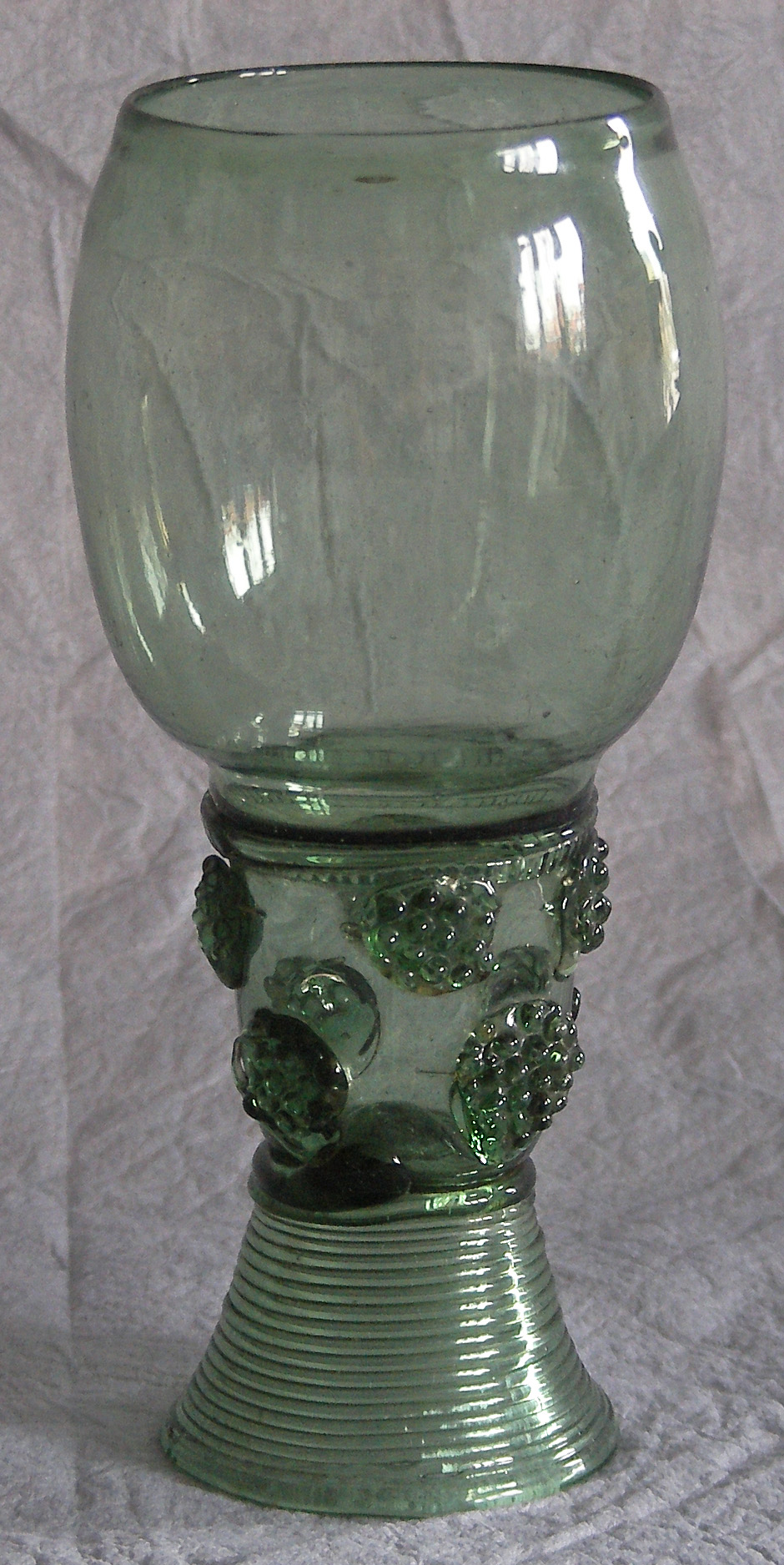
German wine glass (Römer) from the 17th century

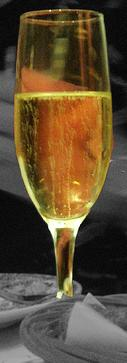
A flute of cava

A flute for Sparkling wine

A coupe can be used for Sparkling wine.

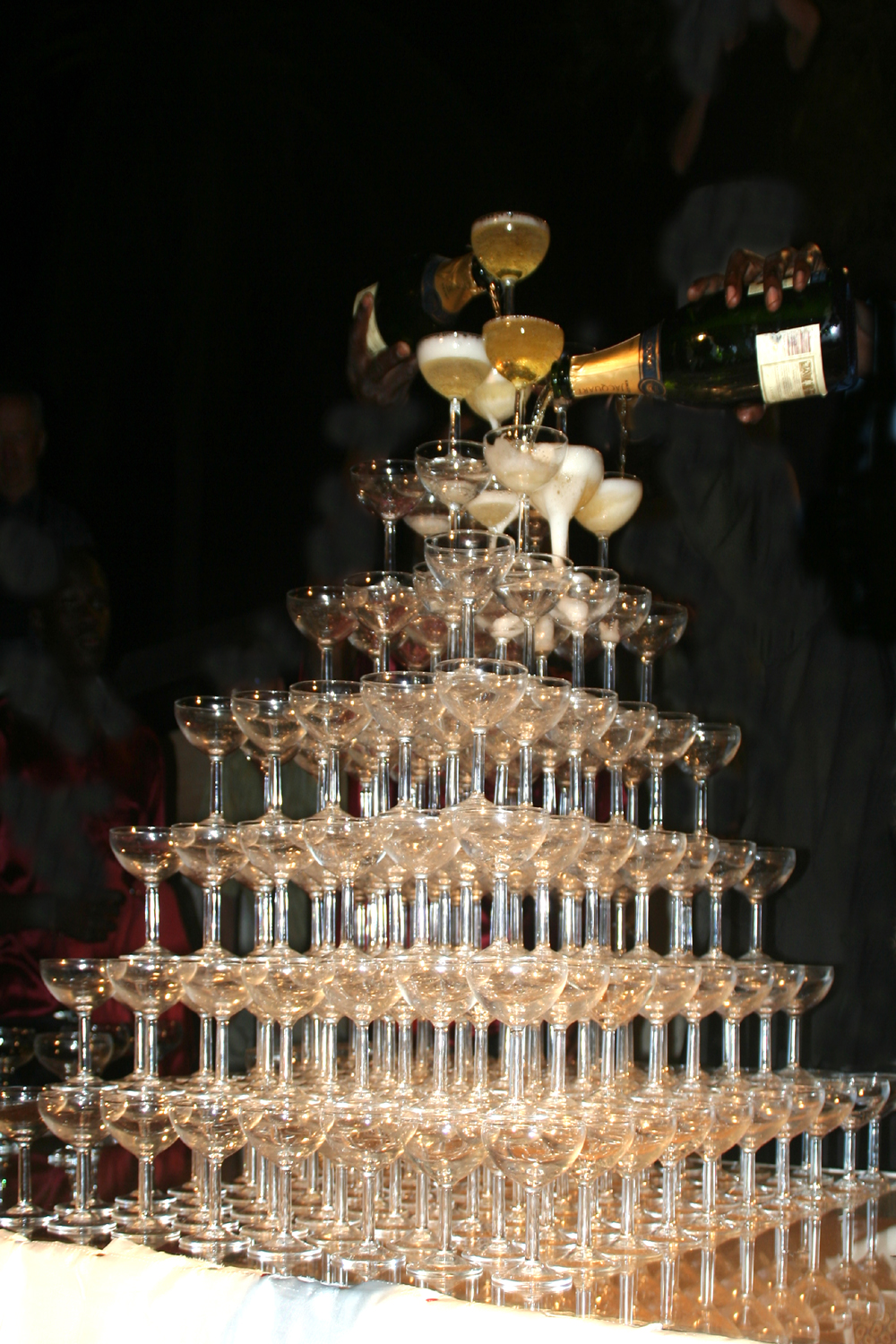
Dramatic effect of a pyramid of coupes

== Types ==
=== Dry white wine ===
The dry white wine is a wine without sugar (the sugar ratio is generally less than 4 grams per liter). It is a wine very difficult to develop because the balance of the wine is based on only two parameters: acidity and alcohol.

Before the 1950s, the traditional European wine was made in small containers where the temperature did not rise high enough to interfere with the fermentation but this method of vinification gave wine structure and roundness but was not aromatic. In California and Australia, the need to cool the grapes and wine during fermentation led winemakers to equip their cellars with adequate equipment: refrigeration units, circuits of pipes to carry the liquid refrigerant, and vats temperature-regulated by coils in the walls of the vessel or flag (a thin welded coil shaped like a flat plate with a high heat exchange capability). This mode of production happened in Europe at the same time as new techniques of treatment of the must (accelerated settling, use of selected yeasts, addition of glues and yeast enzymes, the practice of maceration). In wine jargon, all of these practices give a "technological wine". This is very fragrant, crisp on the palate, and does not require aging. The "old" type of European white wines were well suited to this type of wine – it was the Sauvignon B grape varietal that was first used in this manner, which allowed it to be blended with Semillon B. There has also been a decrease in growing areas in the last thirty years. In Burgundy these practices may face the phenomenon of premature oxidation. Chardonnay is the archetype of the great wine that can be produced with old-fashioned methods.

The photo below compares the colors of two Chenins B and illustrates the visual difference between a South African "technologic" wine and a "classic" French wine from the Loire Valley.

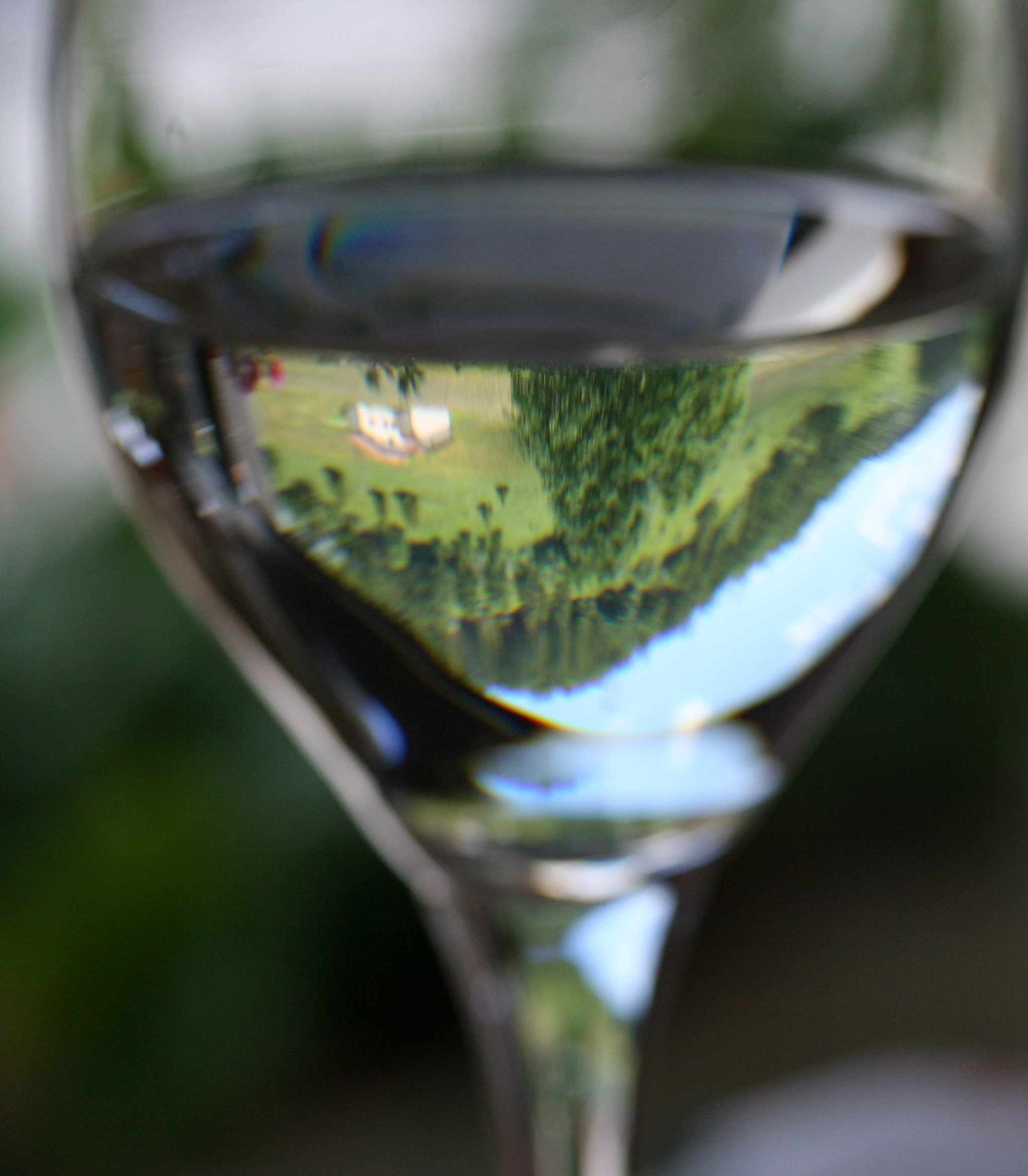
Glass of Chablis

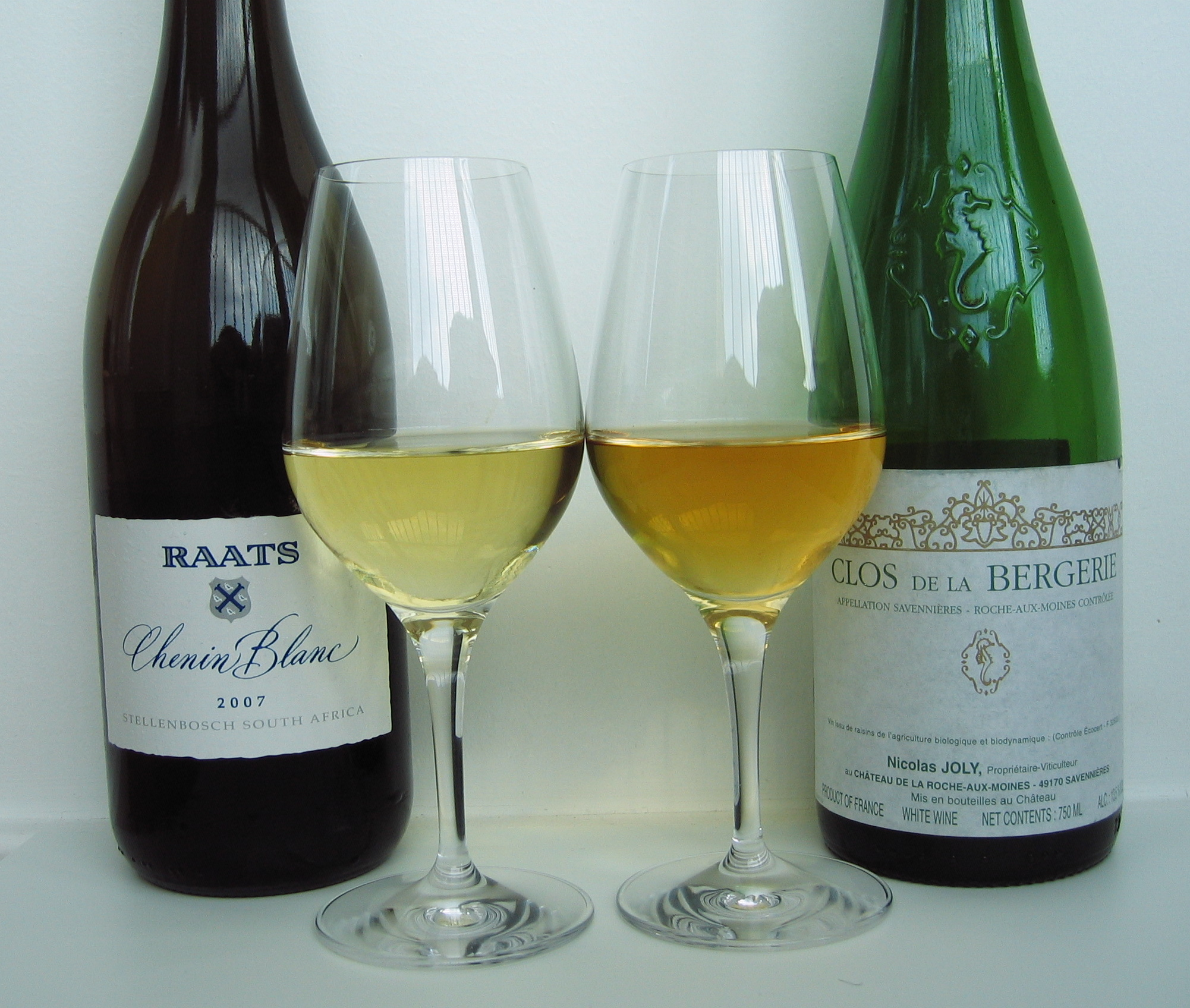
Comparison of color between a South African chenin (a stellenbosch at left) and a French one (a savennières on the right)

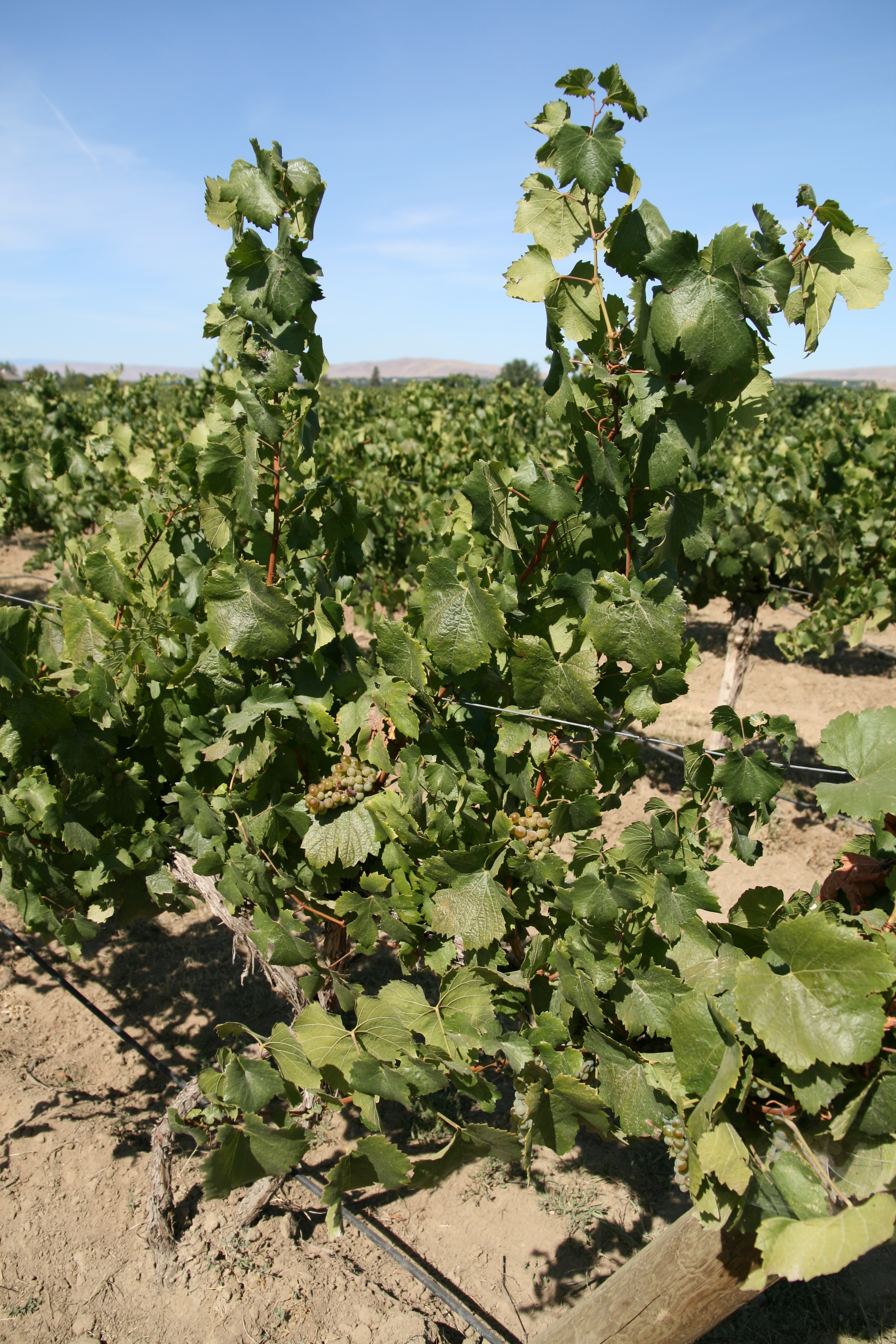
Riesling vines in Washington, United States

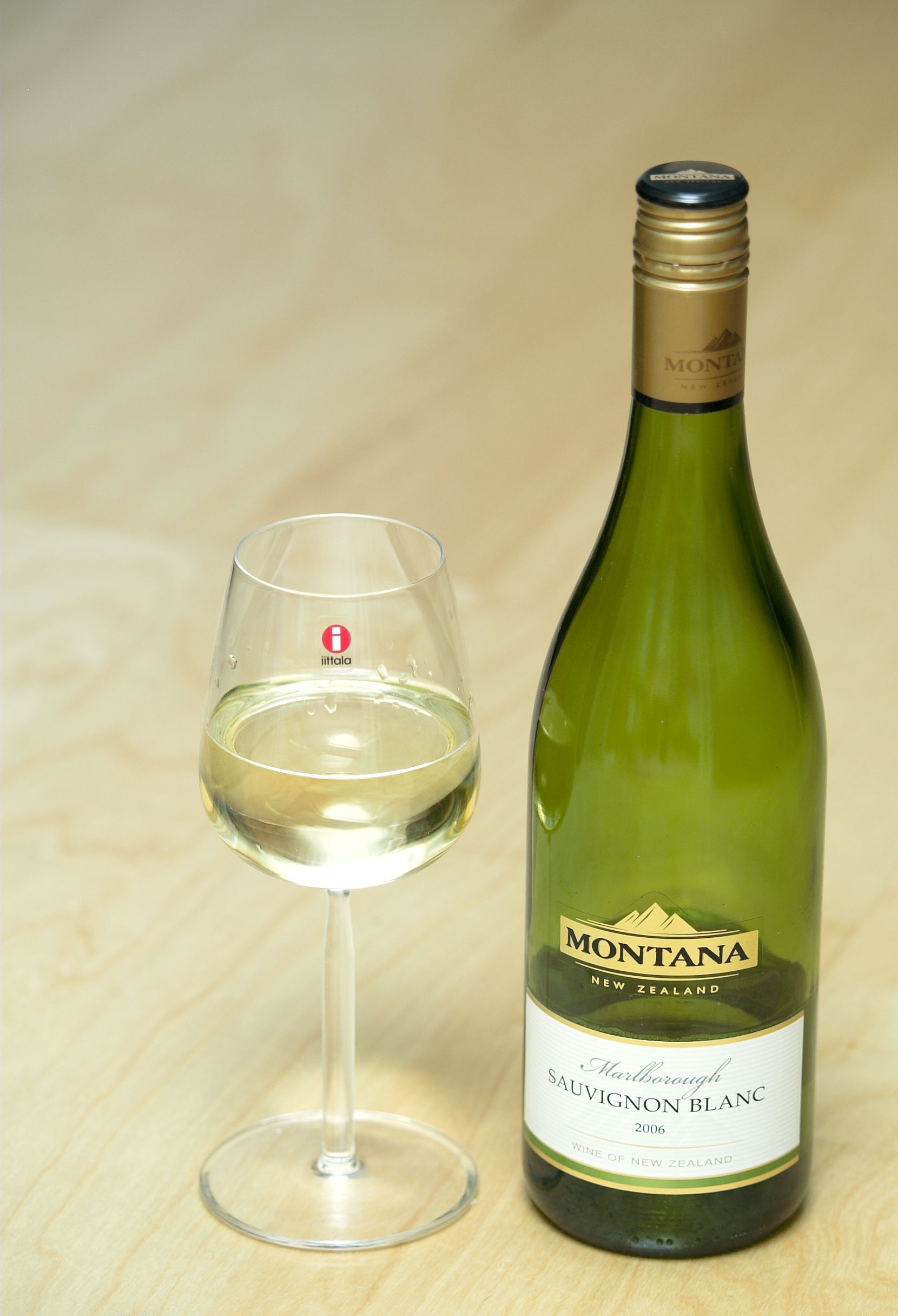
Sauvignon blanc from New Zealand

=== Sweet and fortified white wine ===
There is a wide variety of sweet wines, from slightly sweet all the way to Fortified wine with the consistency of syrup.

The origin of the sugar is from the grape. The fermentation is stopped before it ends, although the practice of chaptalization has changed the practice in certain wine regions. Many techniques exist to concentrate the sugar:

- "Passerillage with straining" or "late harvest" consists of leaving the grapes on the vine to concentrate the sun. The sugar no longer builds up once reaching maturity but the water evaporates which lowers the yield but increases the concentration of sugar. This is the oldest and most common method. It can be improved by plucking the stems: the winemaker prevents sap reaching the cluster and so it dries faster. The annular incision, long practiced, involves removing a ring of bark on the branch below the clusters. The sweet sap cannot descend and is concentrated in the grapes, while the sap continues to feed the upper branch. Another quick method is to cut a portion of the stem. The grape is dried upstream, but the downstream section progresses normally. The blending in the vat or the press of two types of grapes improves the final result.
- "Passerillage without straining" is a practice of concentrating the grapes before pressing. The grapes are hung in an attic or on trays for the time it takes for some of the water they contain to evaporate. This method is the raw material of straw wine
- "noble rot" is a method of concentration depending on climatic conditions. The Botrytis cinerea creates microscopic perforations of the grape skin through which water is allowed to evaporate while maintaining the other components. The action of botrytis induces different flavors in the grape related to chemical reactions in the berry. The precocity of the varietal-land and low vigor of the vine are favorable to the action of noble rot and helps prevent gray rot. This type of grape is used for the production of Hungarian Tokaji, fortified wines of Aquitaine (Sauternes, Barsac, Loupiac, Monbazillac, etc.), and some selections of noble rot berries in Alsace and Germany: Trockenbeerenauslese.
- "Freezing of grapes" and cold pressing are used to squeeze the liquid part of the berries. The flakes of frozen water remain in the press and only the sweet juice flows. This is the principle of ice wine. Cryoextraction is a recent technique invented to reproduce the phenomenon in regions that are not cold enough: The grapes are artificially frozen before being pressed. This method overcomes the climate, and harvesting work can continue without waiting for the frosts (risk of loss of the grapes by weather accident or attack by hungry sparrows), but shortening the maturation does not give the same flavor.
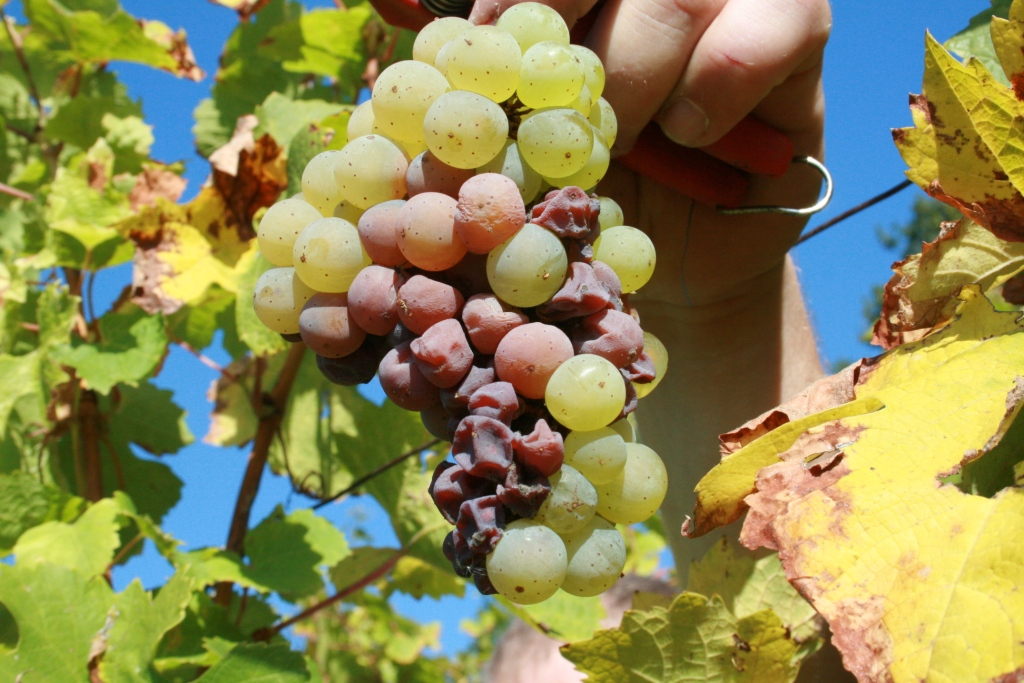
Noble rot on a Riesling B grapevine

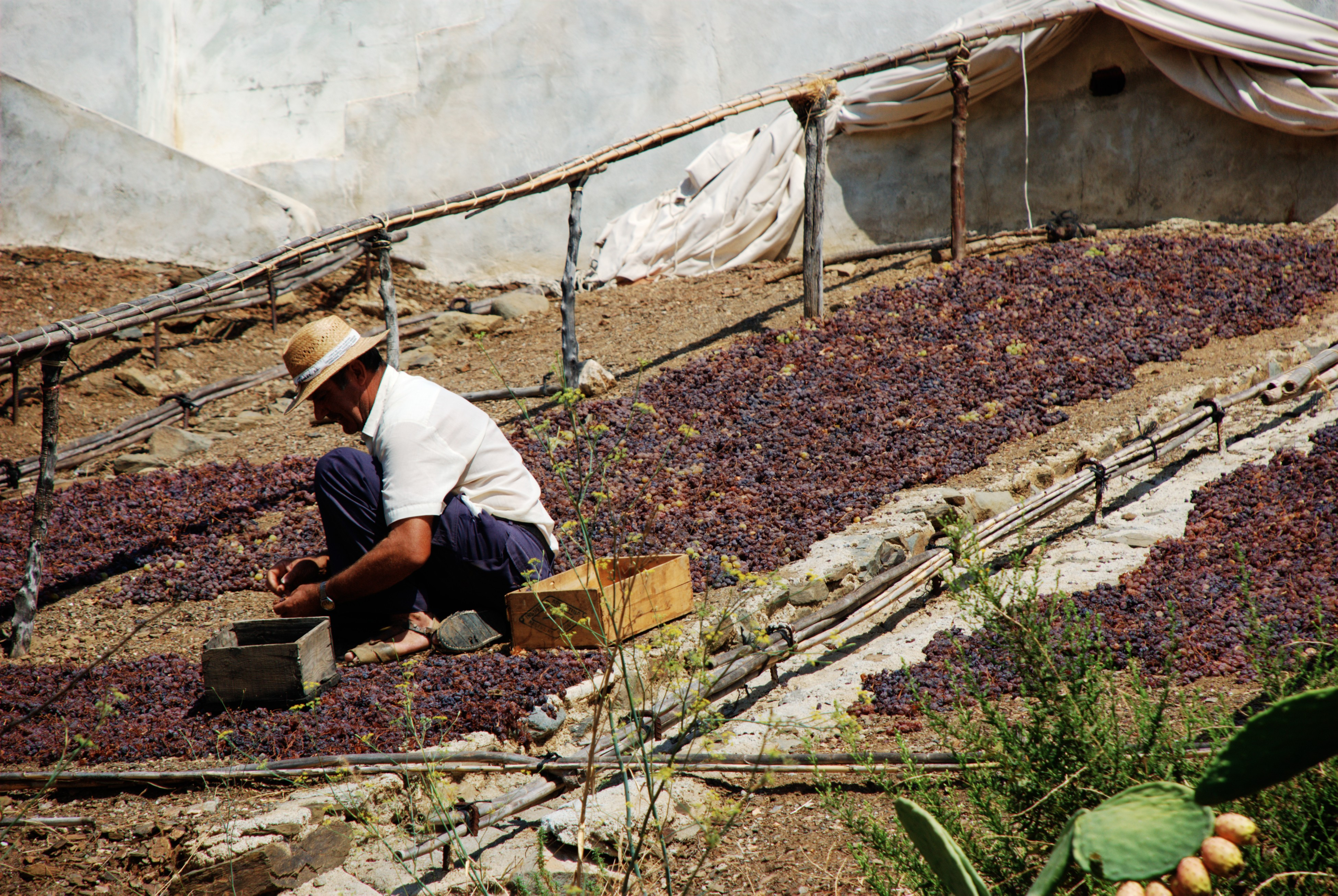
Passerillage without straining at Málaga; the drying gives a reddish-brown color to the white grape.

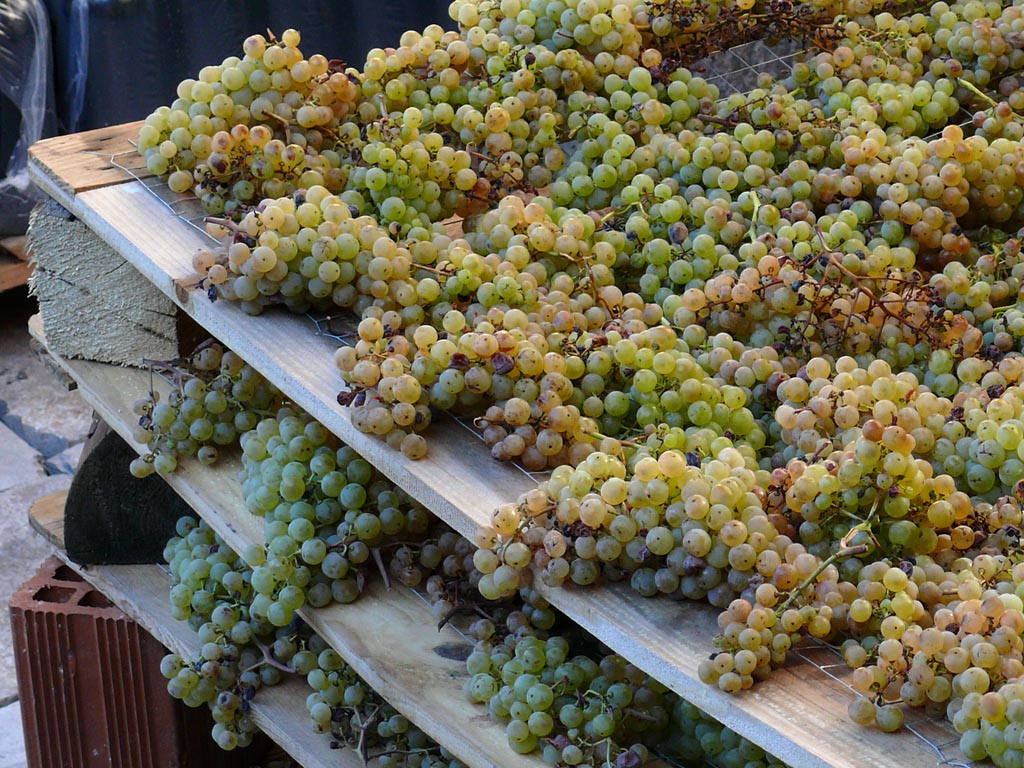
Passerillage without straining of grapes in Slovenia

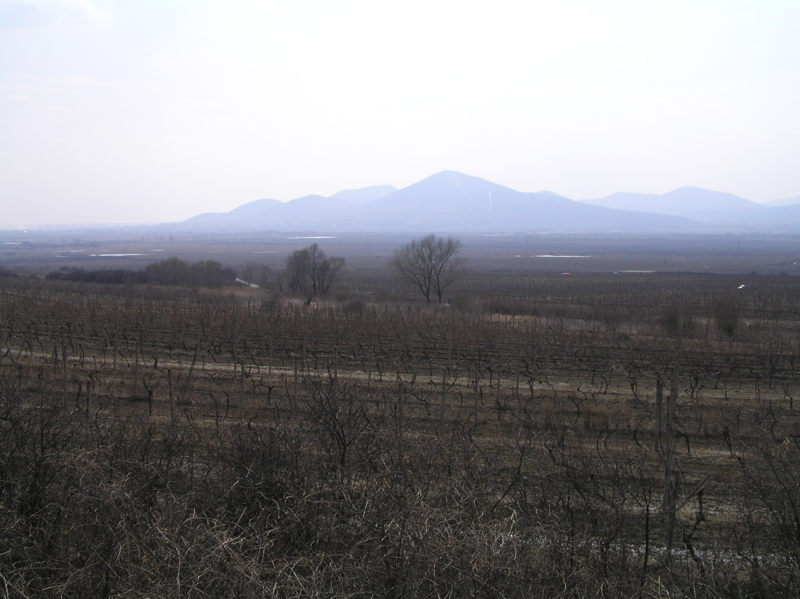
A misty vineyard at Tokay in Slovakia

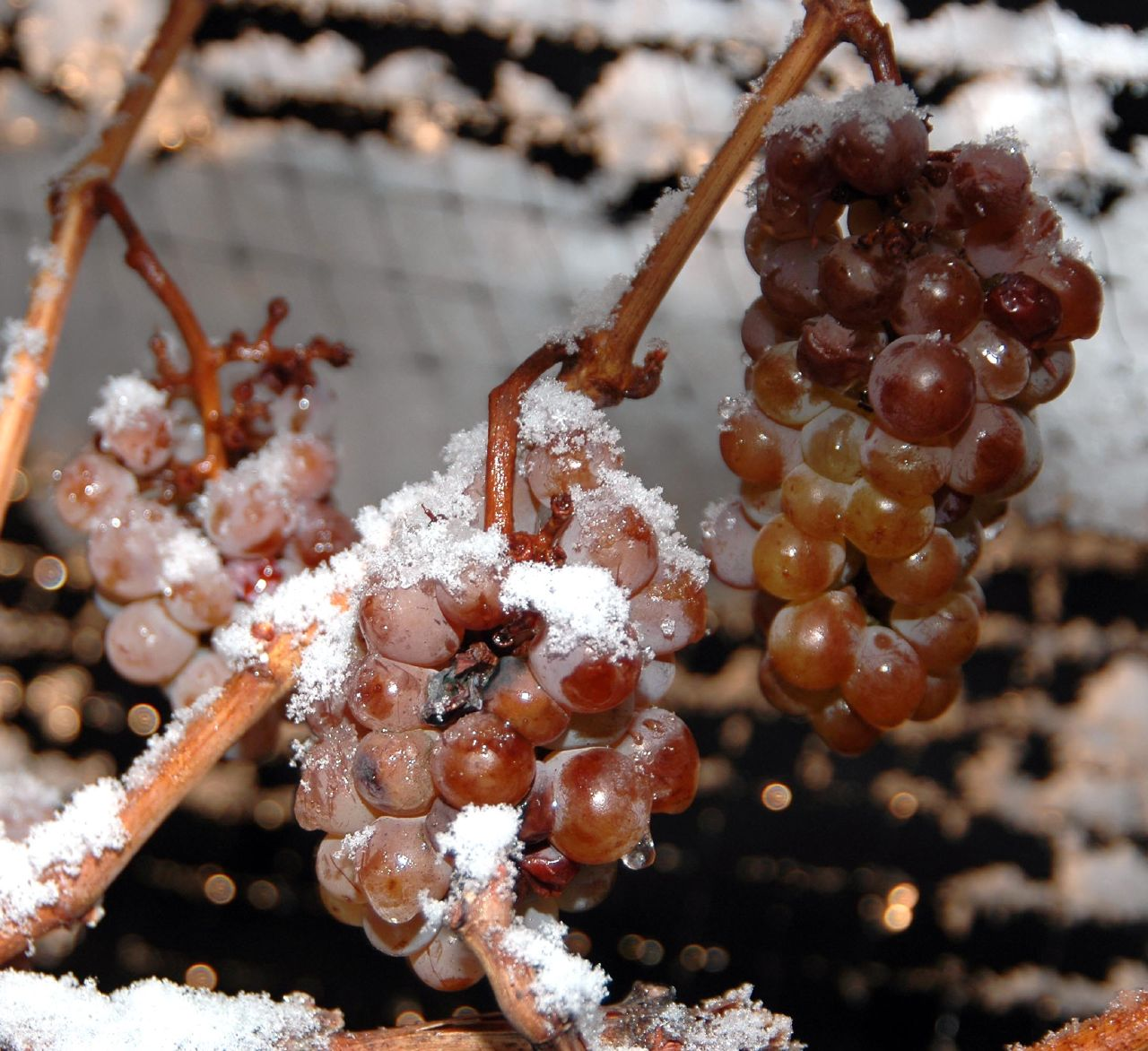
Frozen grapes to be made into ice wine

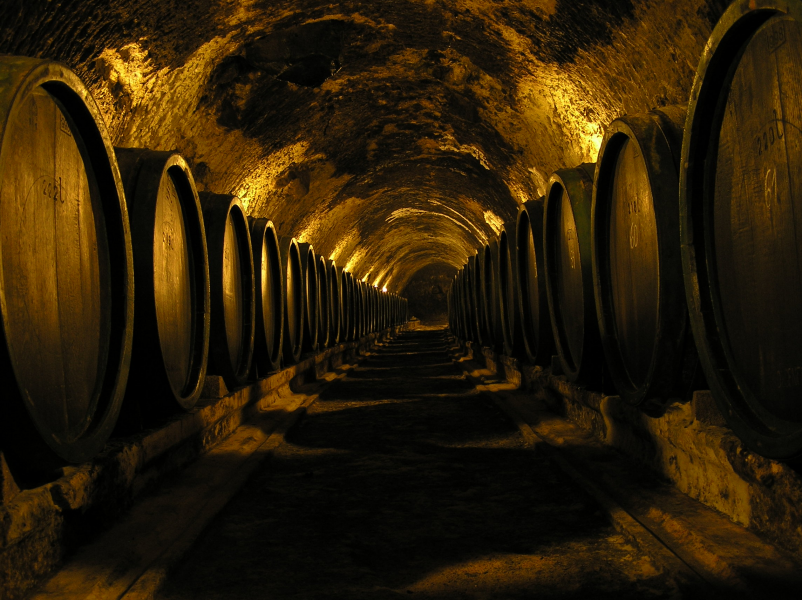
Cellar for aging at Tokay in Slovakia

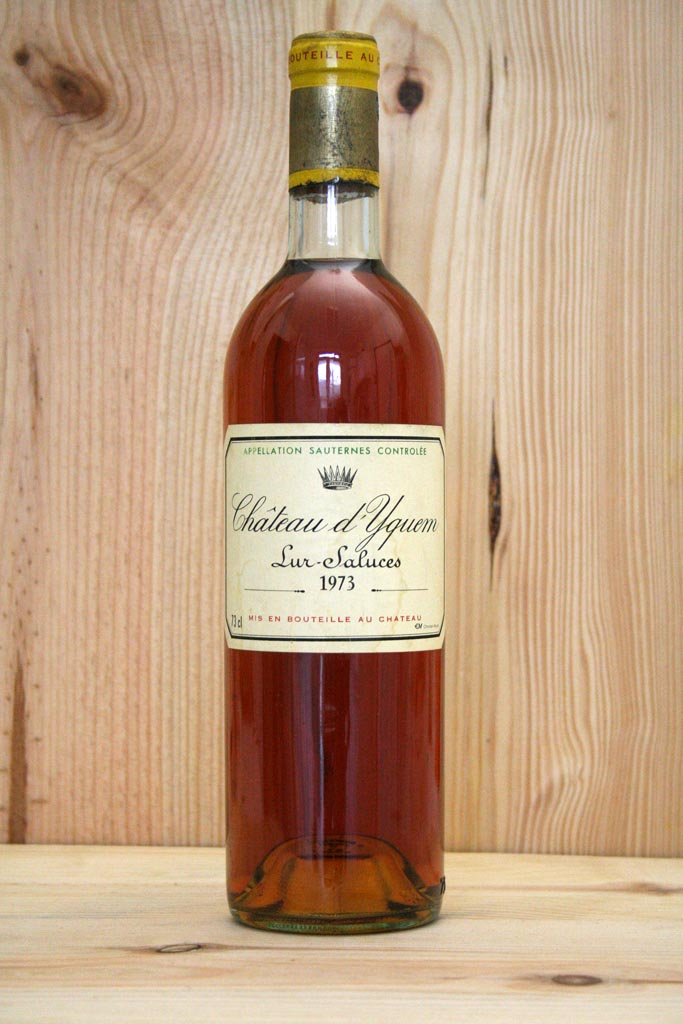
A bottle of Sauternes, a great Fortified wine

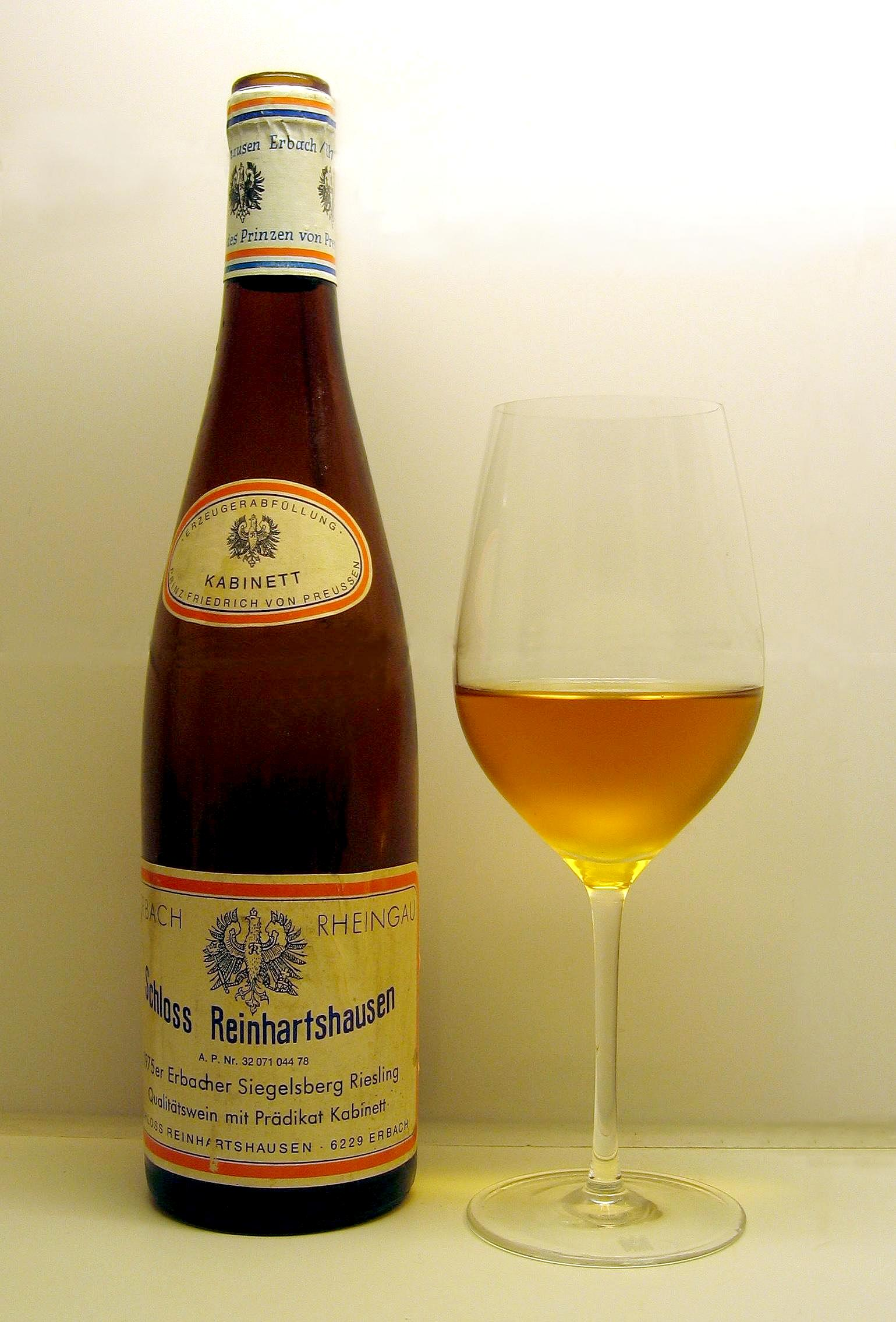
Amber color in an old German riesling opened after 32 years in the bottle

=== Sparkling wine ===
Top producers of sparkling wine (2003)
Country	Millions of barrels
France	480-510
Germany	400-430
Spain	190-220
Italy	180-210
Russia	170-200
United States	85-110
Thailand	70-80
Ukraine	50-70
Poland	40-54
Australia	40-52

Festive Wines par excellence is the prestigious image conveyed by champagne but sparkling wine can come from very different practices. In contrast to sparkling wines, wines without foam are called "still wines".

Sparkling wine is mostly white and contains fermentation gases (carbon dioxide). The first sparkling wine dates back to the very first winemaking. During alcoholic fermentation of all wines yeast produces carbon dioxide so during fermentation all wines are sparkling. For most of them the gas escapes and does not remain dissolved. Methods of production of sparkling wines are therefore intended to maintain the CO_{2} dissolved in the wine which is responsible for the bubbles:

- the traditional method which was once called méthode champenoise consists of vinifying white or rosé wine as for a still wine. A liqueur de tirage (sugar) is then added to the wine and bottled. A second fermentation then occurs in the bottle from yeast and the sugar from the liqueur de tirage. The wine is then dégorgé or disgorged and a liqueur de dosage or mix (liquor more or less sweet depending on the desired final product: brut, demi-sec, or doux).
- the rural method or craft method for a wine in which the fermentation was stopped by cold (in the past it was the arrival of winter blocking fermentation). The remaining sugar finishes fermenting in the bottle, producing dissolved gas. This is the method developed by the producers of Gaillac AOC and Blanquette de Limoux
- the transfer method uses the traditional method but after fermentation the bottles are uncorked and the wine is blended in a closed pressure vessel. It is filtered before being returned to the bottle
- the Dioise method: after fermentation using the standard rural method, the wine is filtered in a vat similar to the transfer method
- the closed vat method: the second fermentation takes place in closed vats. The wine is filtered then bottled under pressure
- the continuous method or Russian method: the wine passes from one closed vat to another. Previously the yeasts were fixed with oak chips. After filtration the wine is bottled under pressure
- the method by gasification: a liqueur de dosage is added to the wine then carbon dioxide is injected into the vat. The wine is bottled under pressure. This is the method of production for flavored sparkling wines.

Made famous by the champagne used to christen large ships at launch, sparkling white wine is produced in almost all wine-producing countries and has become a benchmark for providing a festive and commemorative spirit to an event. This unique side is found in the labeling of the bottle. Firstly the gas pressure requires a heavier bottle, then the plug with its mushroom shape must be retained by a Muselet, and finally the top of the bottle is covered with a metallic foil shell gold or silver colored.

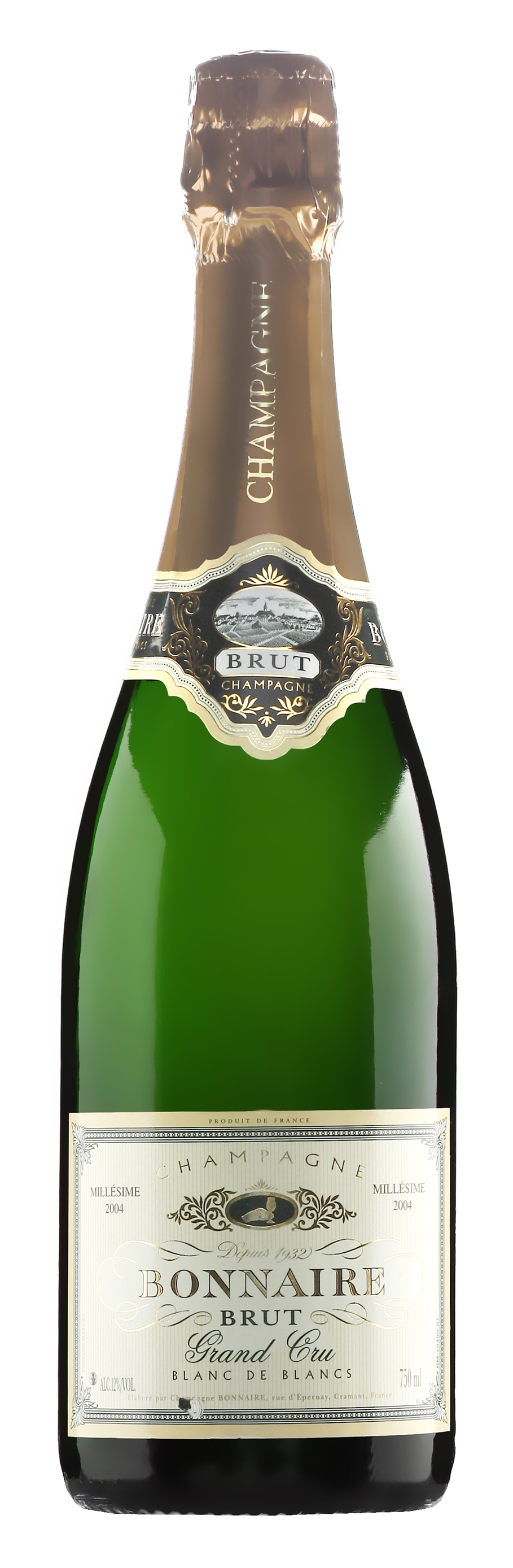
Bottle of sparkling wine with its characteristic covering

Sparkling wine, festival wine by Peder Severin Krøyer, 1888, Gothenburg Museum of Art

=== Fortified wine ===
A fortified wine is a wine in which there has been an addition of alcohol. This category includes three types of wine products depending on the fermentation stage where the fortification took place:

- The mistelles or dessert wines are grape juices whose fermentation has been prevented by fortification with alcohol. Although the absence of fermentation can lead to discussion of their qualification as wine, it is nevertheless an alcoholic grape product. The Pineau des Charentes, the floc de Gascogne, and the macvin du Jura are three AOC French mistelles.
- The Vin doux naturel or sweet wines are wines where fermentation was stopped before completion. The added alcohol retains the grape sugar and guarantees its smooth taste. The majority of muscat wines fall into this category (Muscat de Beaumes-de-Venise, Muscat de Rivesaltes, Muscat de Mireval, Moscatell Catalan, Moscato d'Asti etc.) as do white port, and Madeira.
- The vins mutés secs or dry fortified wines are dry wines (without sugar) whose fermentation was completed. A quantity of alcohol is added to increase their alcohol content. They age for a long time giving wines with the ability to be kept for a very long time. These wines are the sherries and some dry white ports.
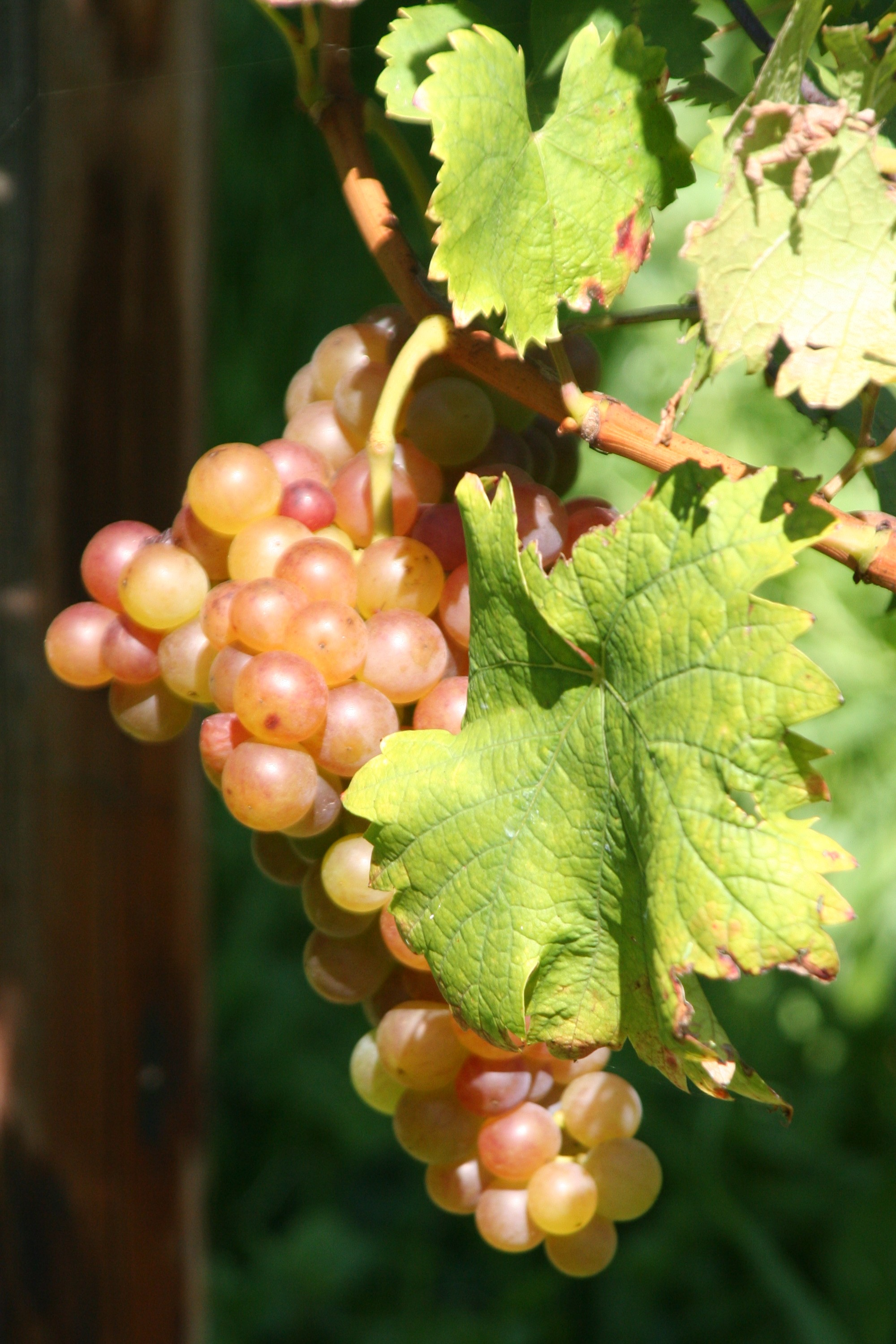
Muscat Rose grapes with small berries Rs

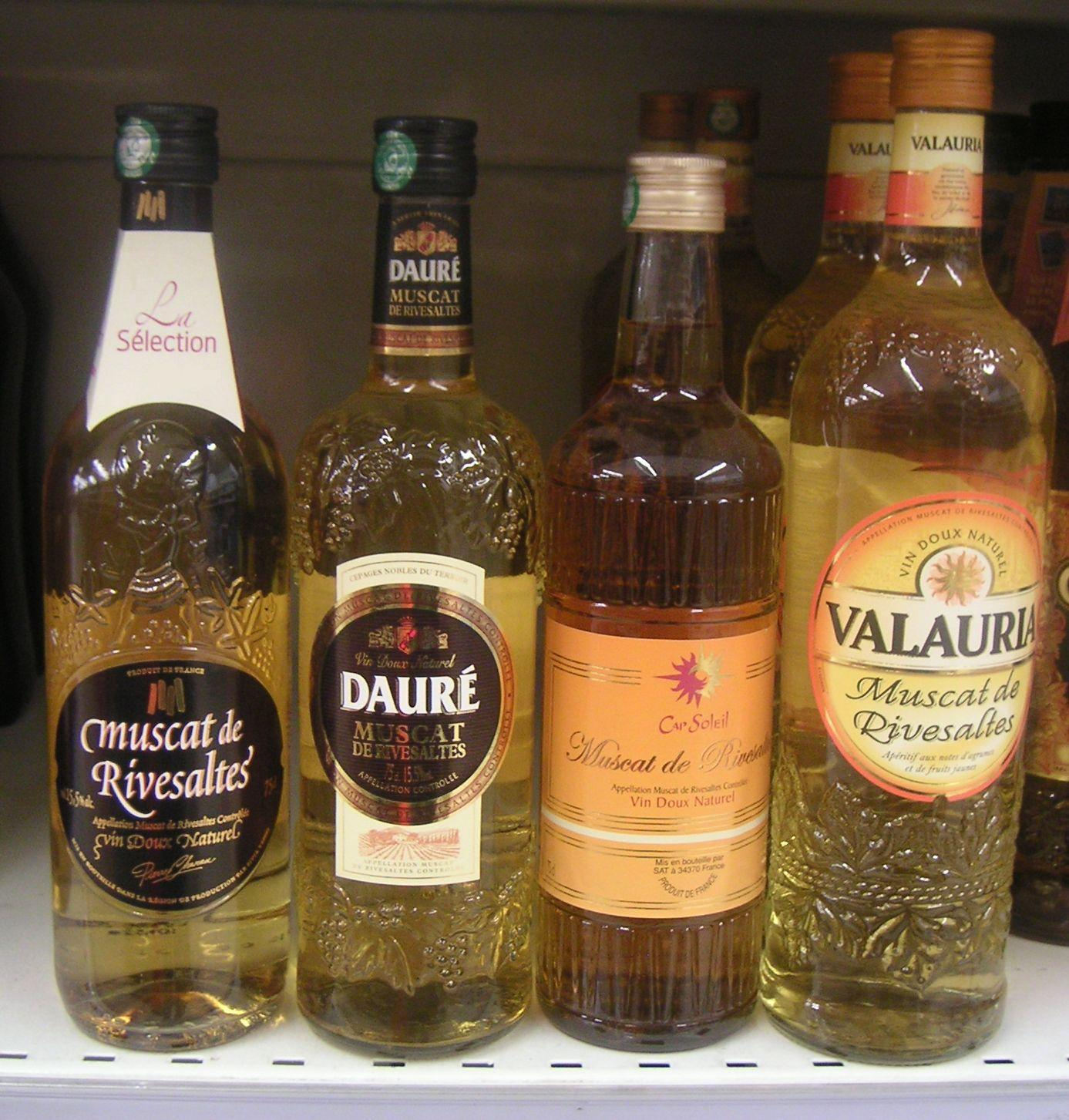
Bottles of Muscat de Rivesaltes AOC

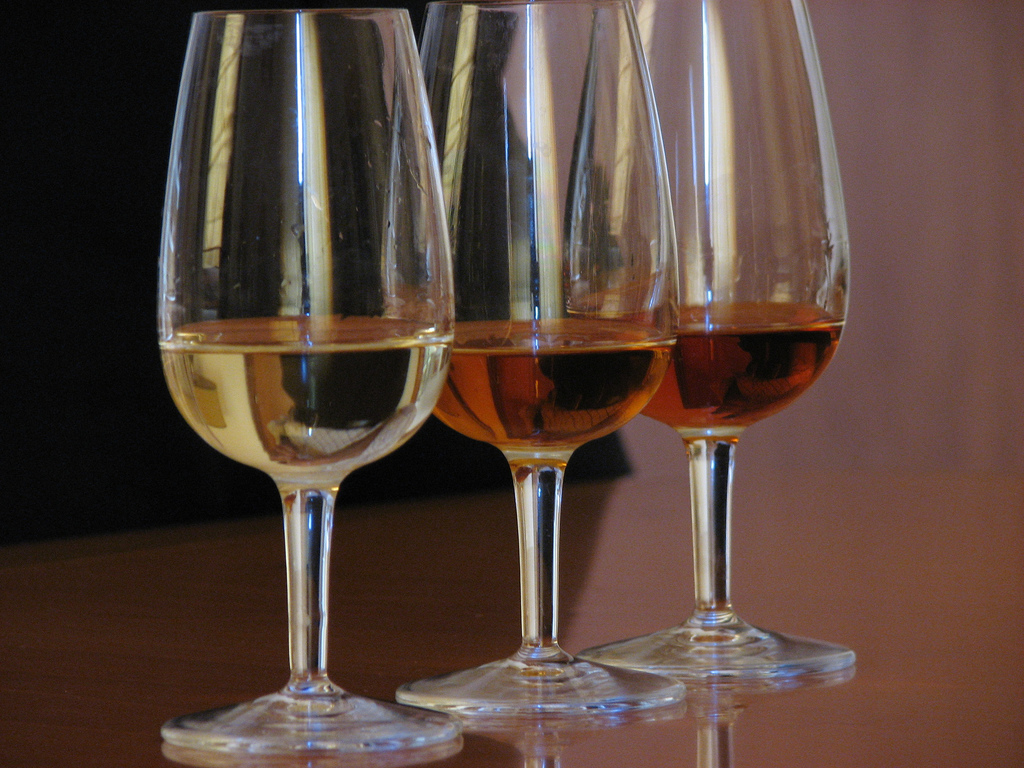
Nuances in the color of marsala

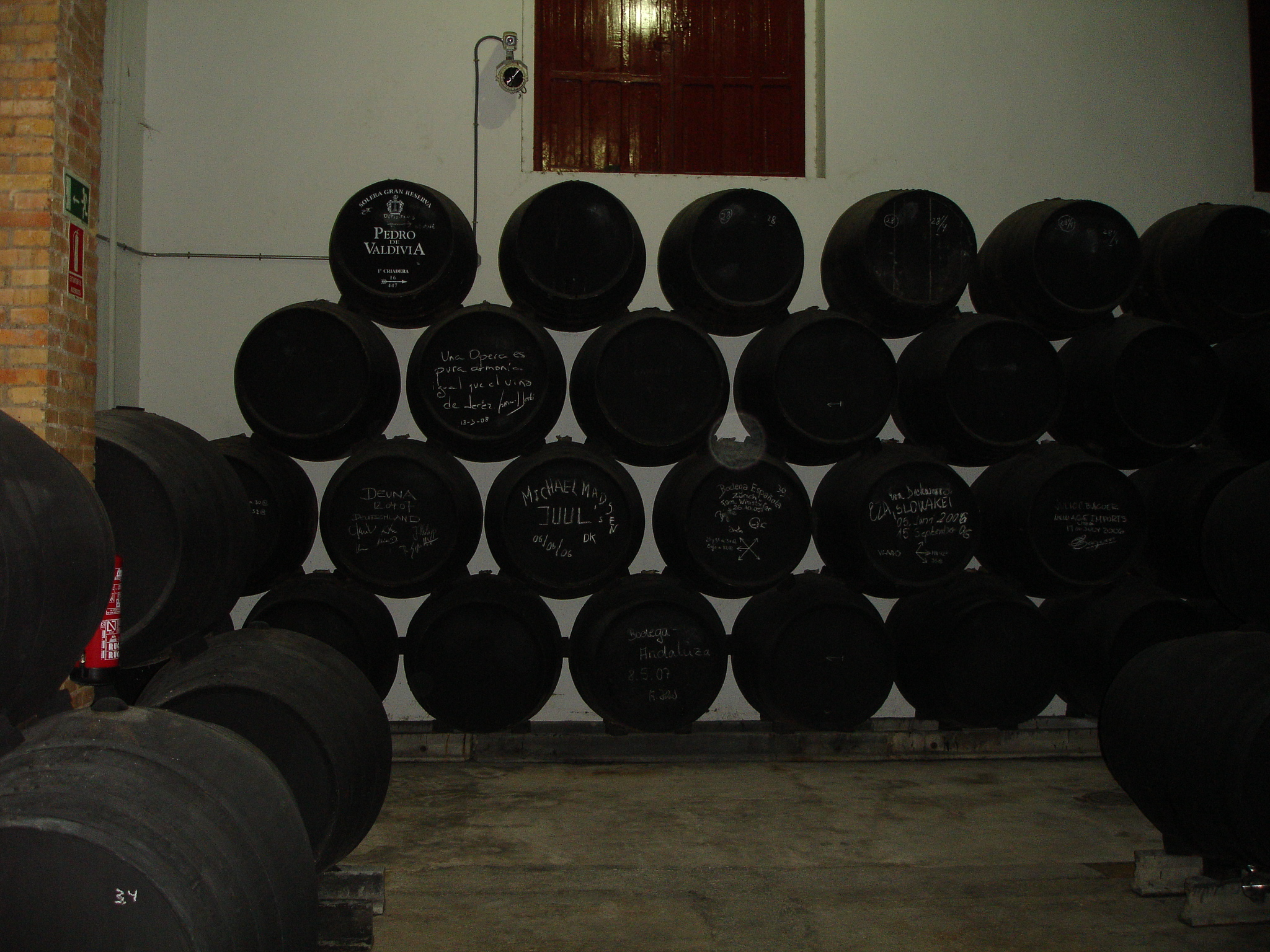
Aging of Sherry in solera

== Culinary aspects ==
The temperature of service is a criterion to put wine in the best condition for drinking. The wine must be chilled but not be served with ice. Between 8 and 9 °C, the chill will accentuate the liveliness of the bubbles and reduce the sweetness of a sweet or fortified wine. For an aromatic dry wine service between 10 and 12 °C stimulates vivacity and gives freshness to the flavors. Finally, the great white wines are best at a temperature between 12 and 14 °C which allows the flavors and the structure to be revealed.

=== Pairing white wine and food ===
The acidity of dry white wine is reduced by slightly salty or sweet dishes while the wine accentuates the salty side of food and tempers heavy fatty foods. Sweet wine goes well with sweet and savory dishes to mitigate the heavy sugar and stimulate the fruitiness.

For an aperitif, flavored dry wine or sparkling wine goes with all meals. Specialists in tasting consider that the sugar or alcohol in some wines has a saturating effect on the taste buds, by contrast the fruity liveliness awakens them to the meal to come.

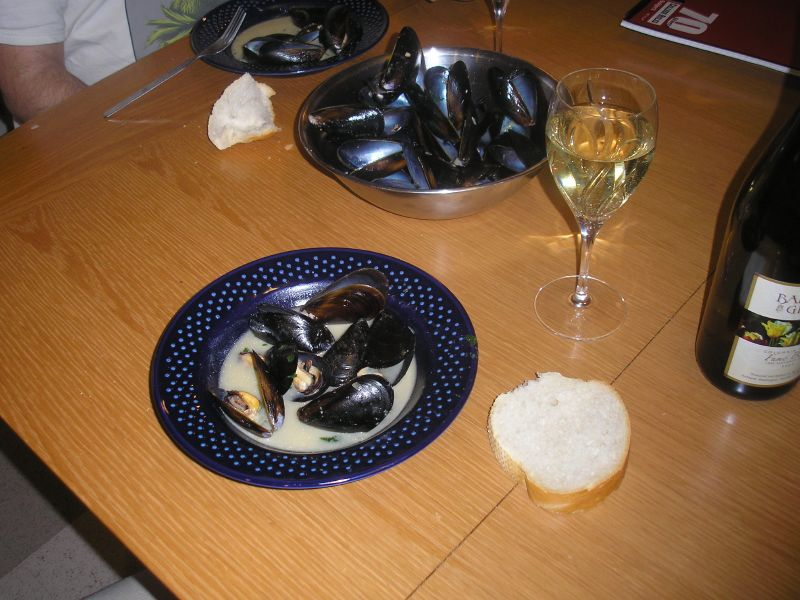
Mussels and white wine

At mealtimes very dry wines with little minerals are recommended with oysters and seafood: their acidity reveals the salinity of the shellfish. The most fragrant wines go well with shellfish, fish, or poached white meat. For stews the acidity of white wine counterbalances the mass of fat. If the sauce is well balanced with an intense ingredient (lemon juice or mustard) a more opulent wine can be recommended: sweet or dry wine aged in barrels. Sweet wines, either just sweet or fortified, are a good option for exotic dishes with sweet spices (dishes with cinnamon, vanilla etc.). Fortified white wines are recommended with foie gras. Sparkling wines can be taken at any time during the meal, their diversity allows this. A choice of sparkling wine also allows the retention of the same wine from the beginning to the end of the meal.

Gourmets generally prefer white wine to red to accompany cheese as its acidity agrees well with the fat in dairy products. Dry wines with mineral aromas such as chardonnay or sauvignon blanc bring out the milky taste of goat cheese. Aromatic wines, such as Gewurztraminer and some sparkling wines support the strong taste of washed-rind cheeses (Maroilles, Époisses, Munster, etc.). Neutral white wines (Castilla-La Mancha, Italian Trebbiano) are well suited to sheep cheese and there are also manchego and pecorino romano for a little spicy. The cooked pressed cheeses require a bold wine, woodland. There is perfect agreement between the Comté cheese and the yellow wine of the Jura. Fortified wines are recommended with veined cheeses (Blue or Roquefort). In this case, the cheese mold (Penicillium roqueforti) and the wine (noble rot) form a harmonious whole.

White wine is also a dessert wine. All choices are allowed even if the sweet and fortified wines are more suitable for this. Perfumed wines (Gewurztraminer, Muscat), sparkling, and sweet wines accord well with fruit desserts (salad, tart). The fortified and sparkling wines support rich desserts made with cream or butter. Crèmes brûlées or caramel which combine sugar and cream can be eaten with a sweet and lively wine such as Jurançon or a late harvest wine. Chocolate requires a very powerful wine so white wine selection is quite limited: a natural amber sweet wine is the best compromise.

More than other wines, white wine is a wine that can be consumed between meals. The habits of the Anglo-Saxons and Germans require a sweet wine or a dry and fruity wine.

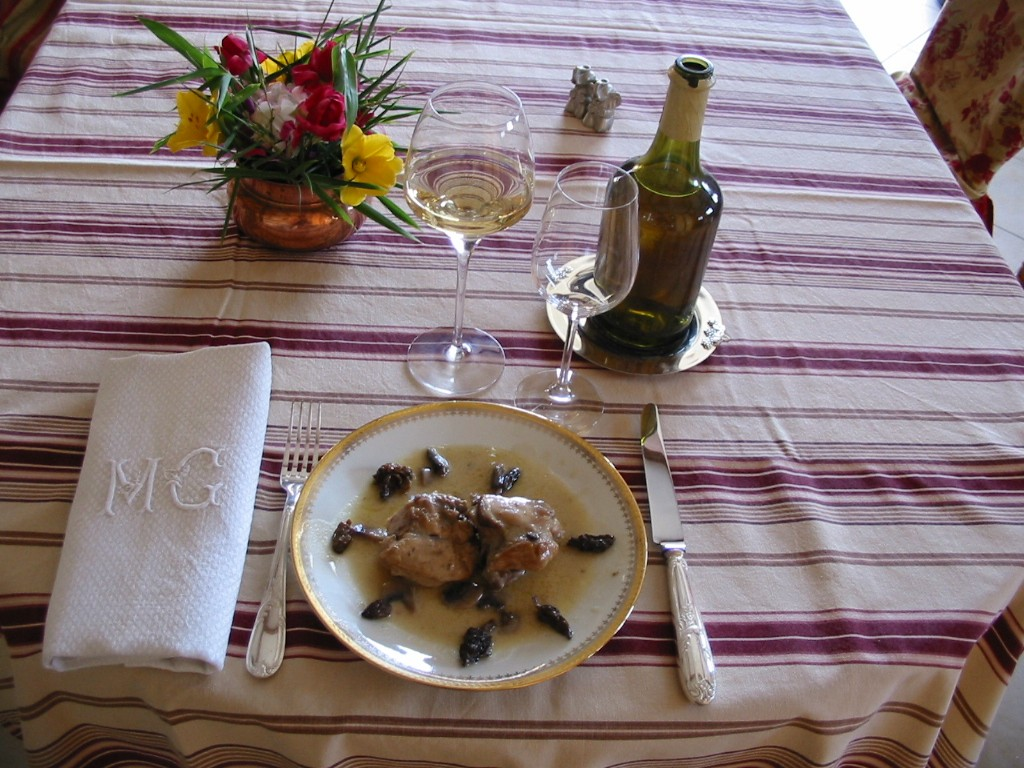
Bresse chicken with morels and yellow wine

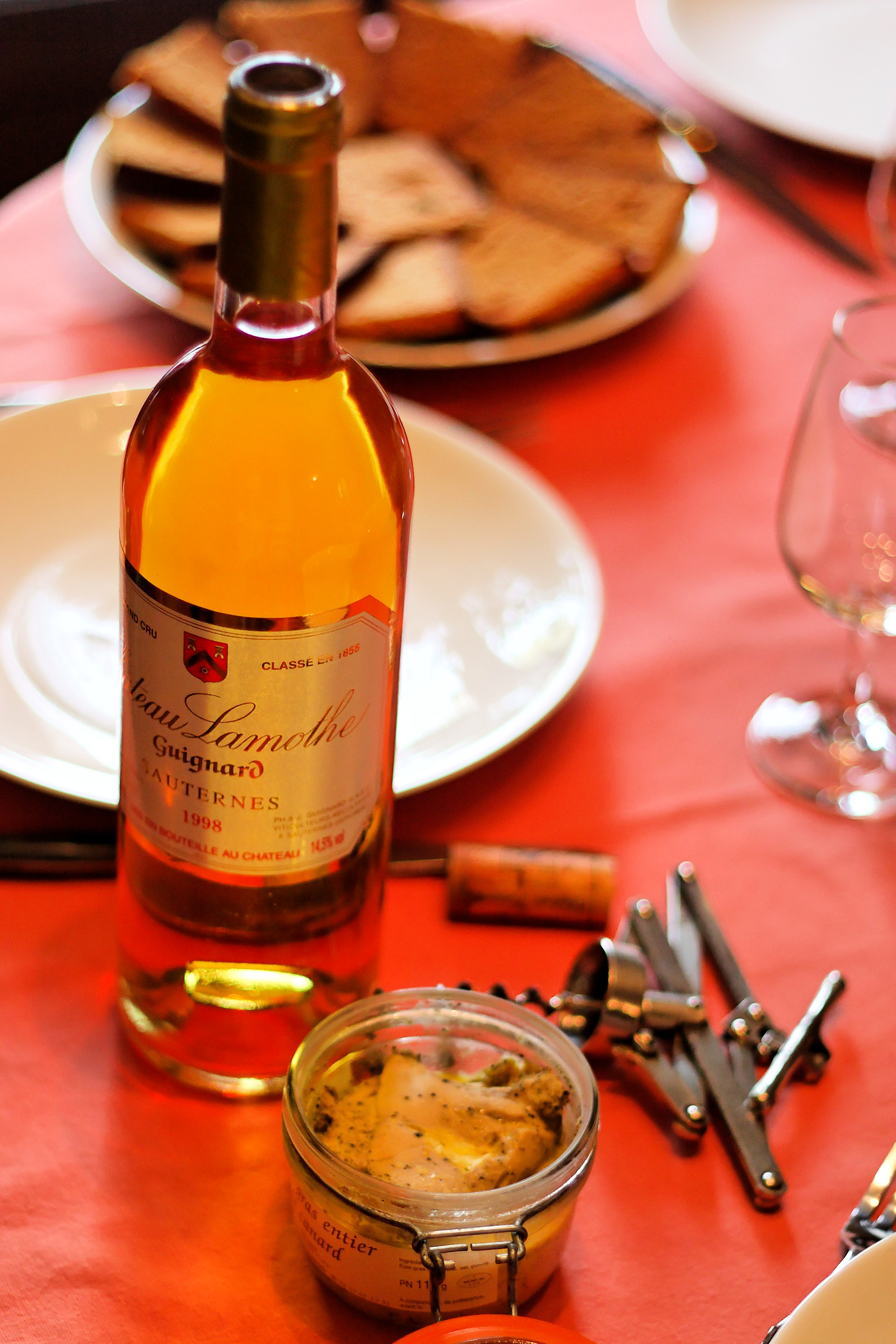
Foie gras and fortified wine

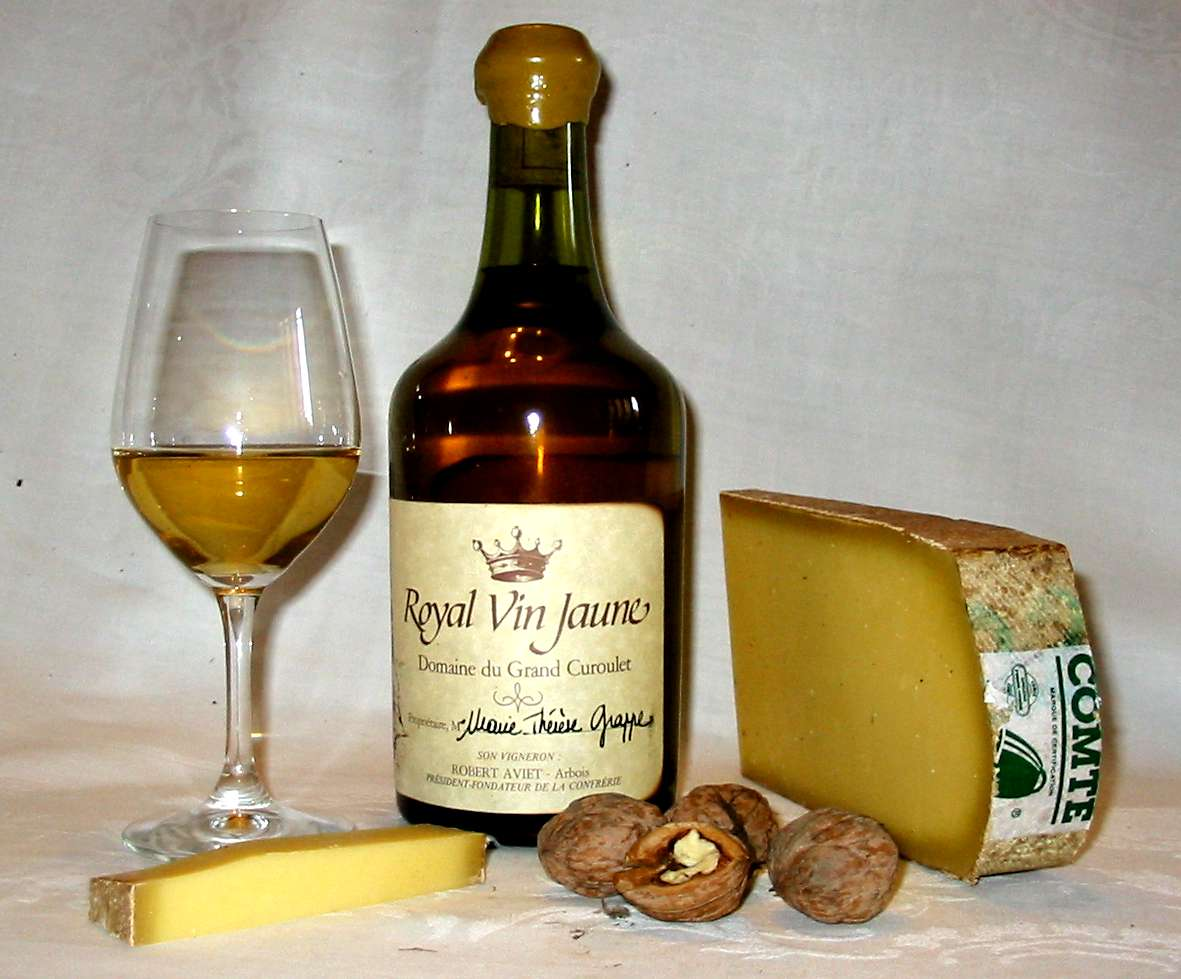
Yellow wine, Comté cheese, and walnuts

=== White wine as an ingredient ===
White wine is regularly used as an ingredient. Its acidity balances well with fat, taking away excess heaviness. This acidity also refines the meat or fish and it helps to break down the fibres of the meat to make it tender. The role of white wine is similar to that of lemon juice used under the same conditions: once verjuice also fulfilled this function. The vinegar combines acidity with a burning sensation that gives recipes where it is used a bittersweet side characteristic.

As a means to balance the fat, white wine is involved in the preparation of sauces such as ravigote sauce, béarnaise sauce, marinara sauce, etc. The drippings of cooking juices is also a role that white wine can be used in; made with a sweet white wine and giving a sour-sweet or sweet-salt sauce. In cheese fondue the liveliness of dry white wine is balanced with the fat of the cheese. The freshness of the wine as a table drink contrasts the heat of the fondue.

In marinades its power to soften the protein fibre is used. Sometimes it can even happen in cooking such as in Italian-style tuna carpaccio.

White wine is also used as a wetting agent for slow cooking. In this type of dish it combines the flexibility of the meat and balances the fat from the sauce. It plays this role in the case of cabbage, baeckeoffe or risotto, and in the gravy in the preparation of white meat as in osso buco or blanquette de veau (veal stew), chicken with morels and its variants, chicken à la comtoise and yellow coq au vin, rabbit or with charcuterie such as diots and tripe. It can also be used to prepare fish and seafood dishes such as pôchouse with Burgundy wine, monkfish stew, flounder stew, mussels in white wine, or seafood pot-au-feu.

A common rule by gourmets is to serve at table the same wine that has been used in cooking.

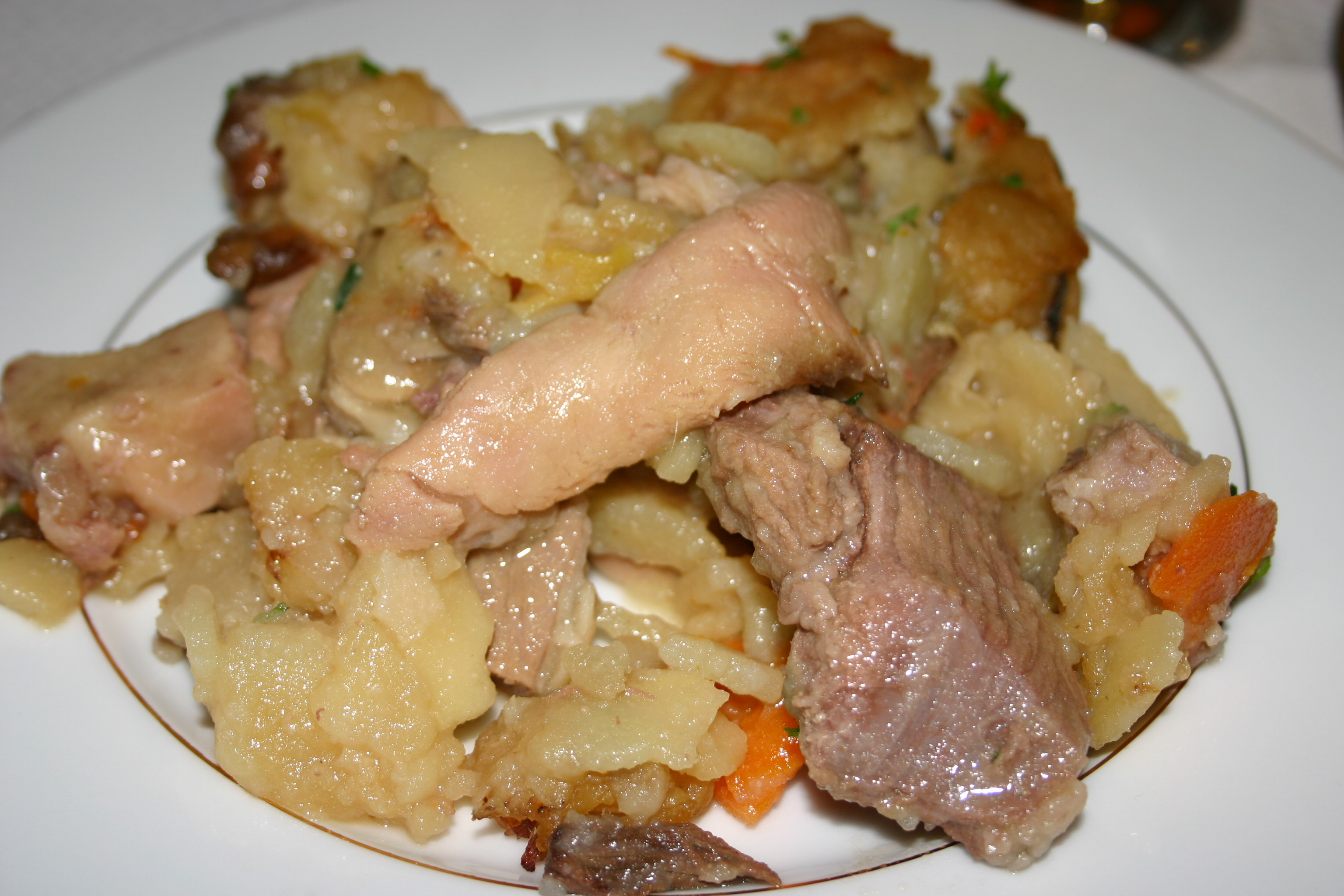
Baeckeoffe cooked in white wine

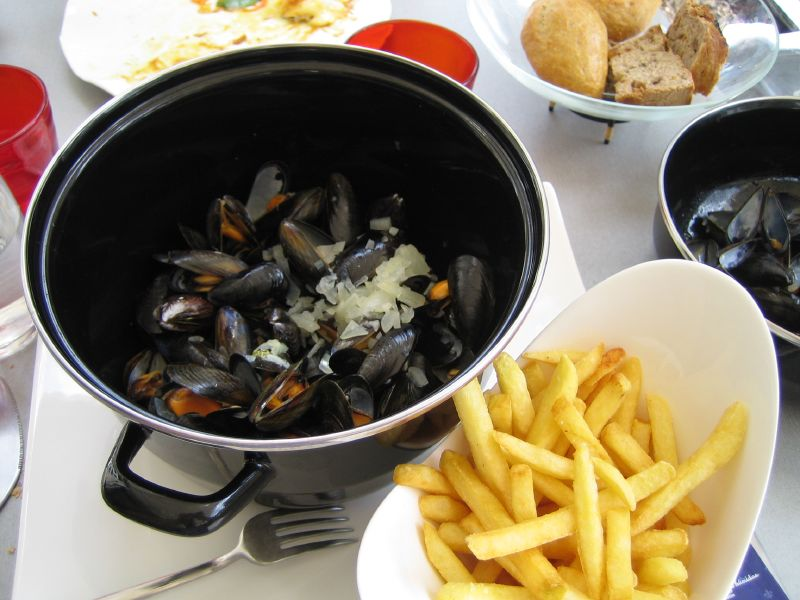
Mussels in white wine and chips

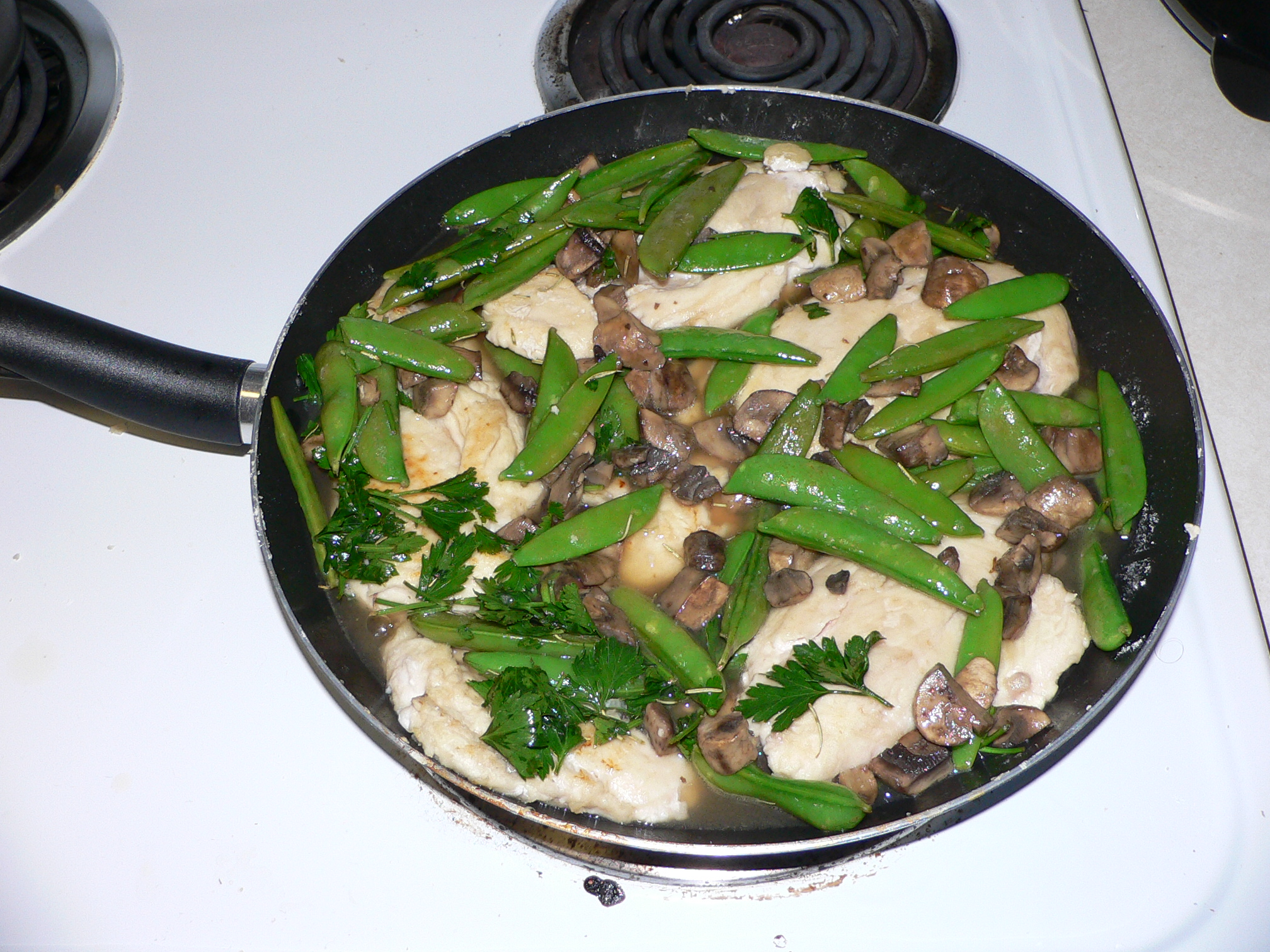
Chicken marsala

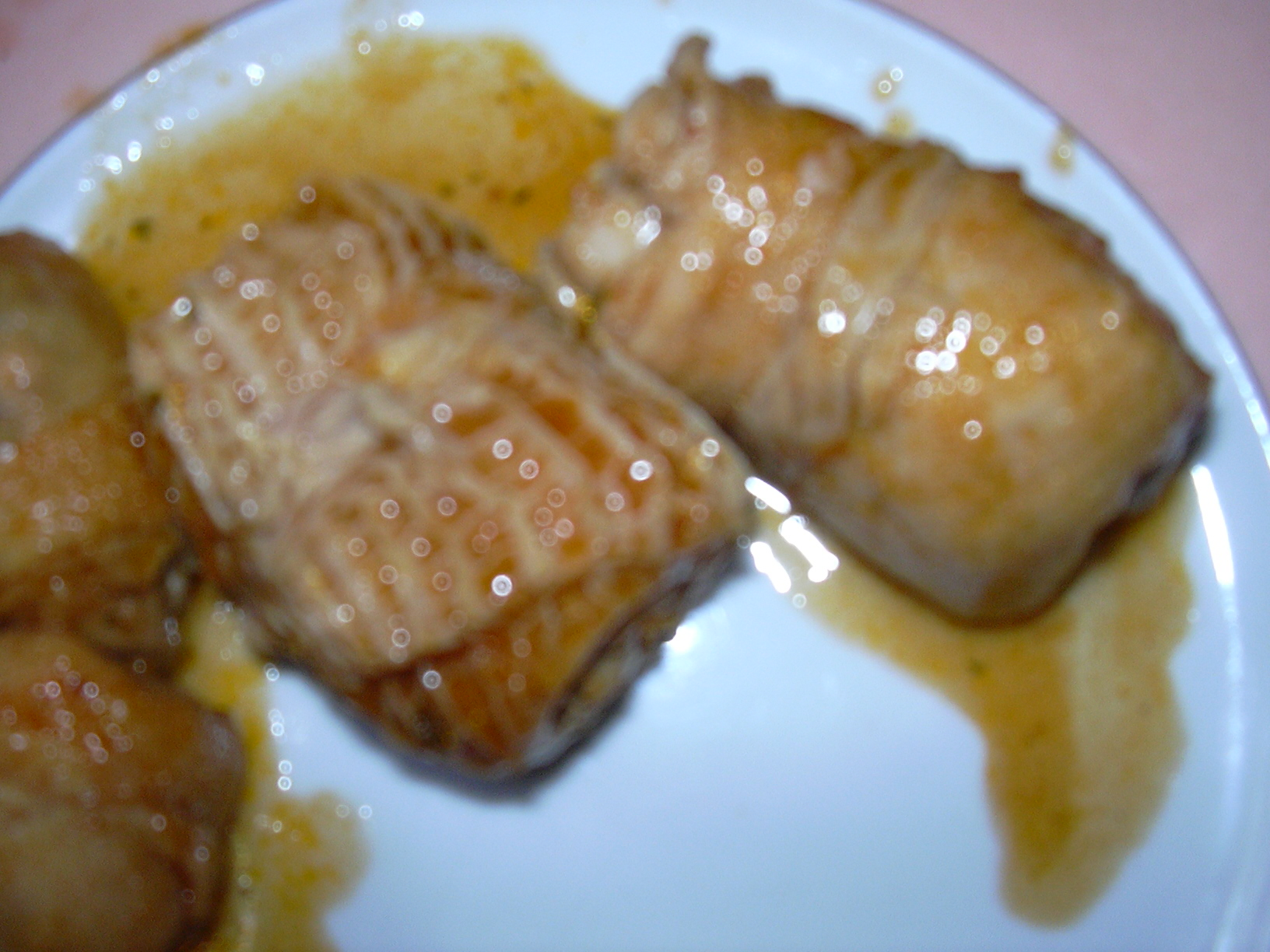
Aveyron tripe

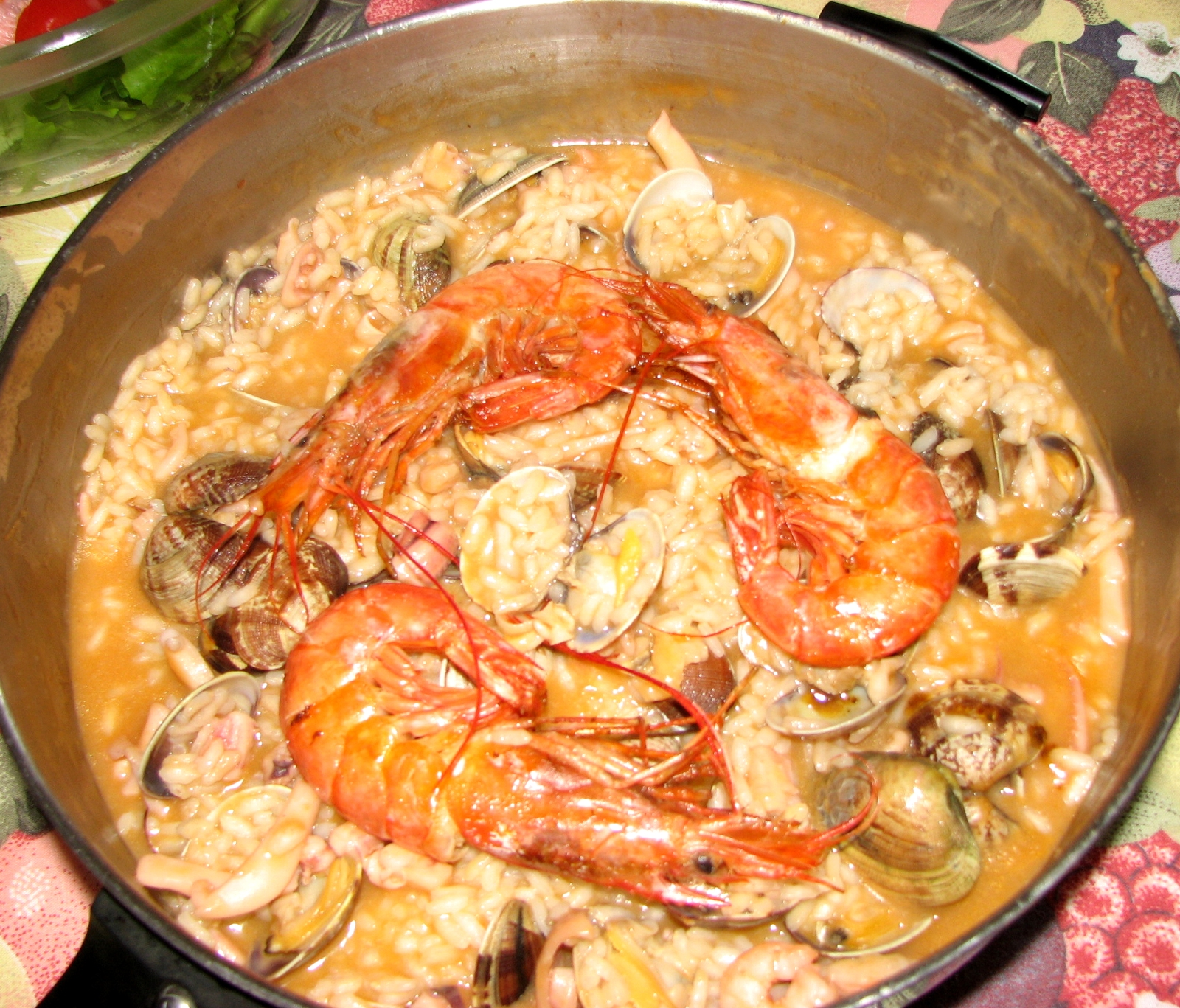
Risotto with prawns

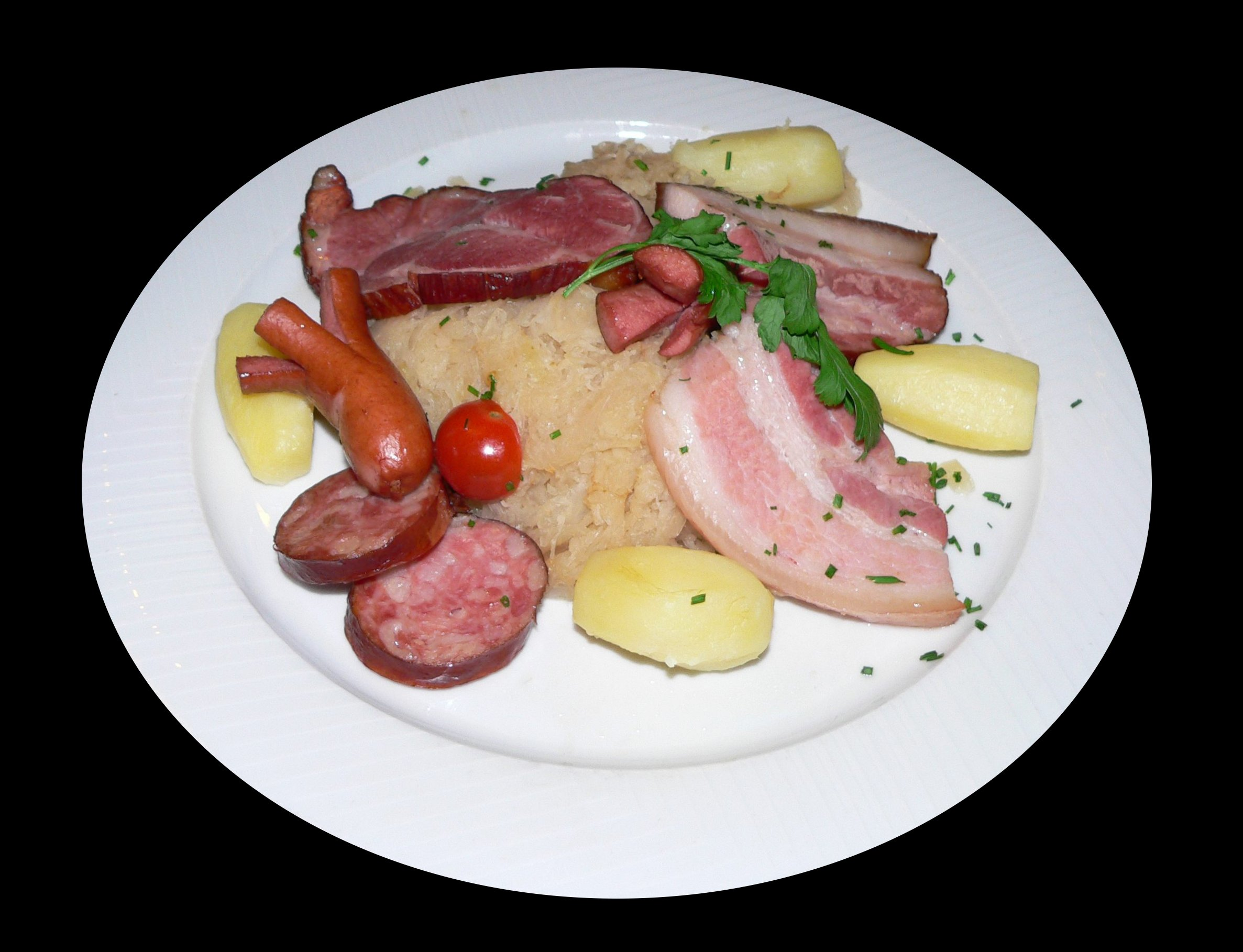
Alsatian sauerkraut

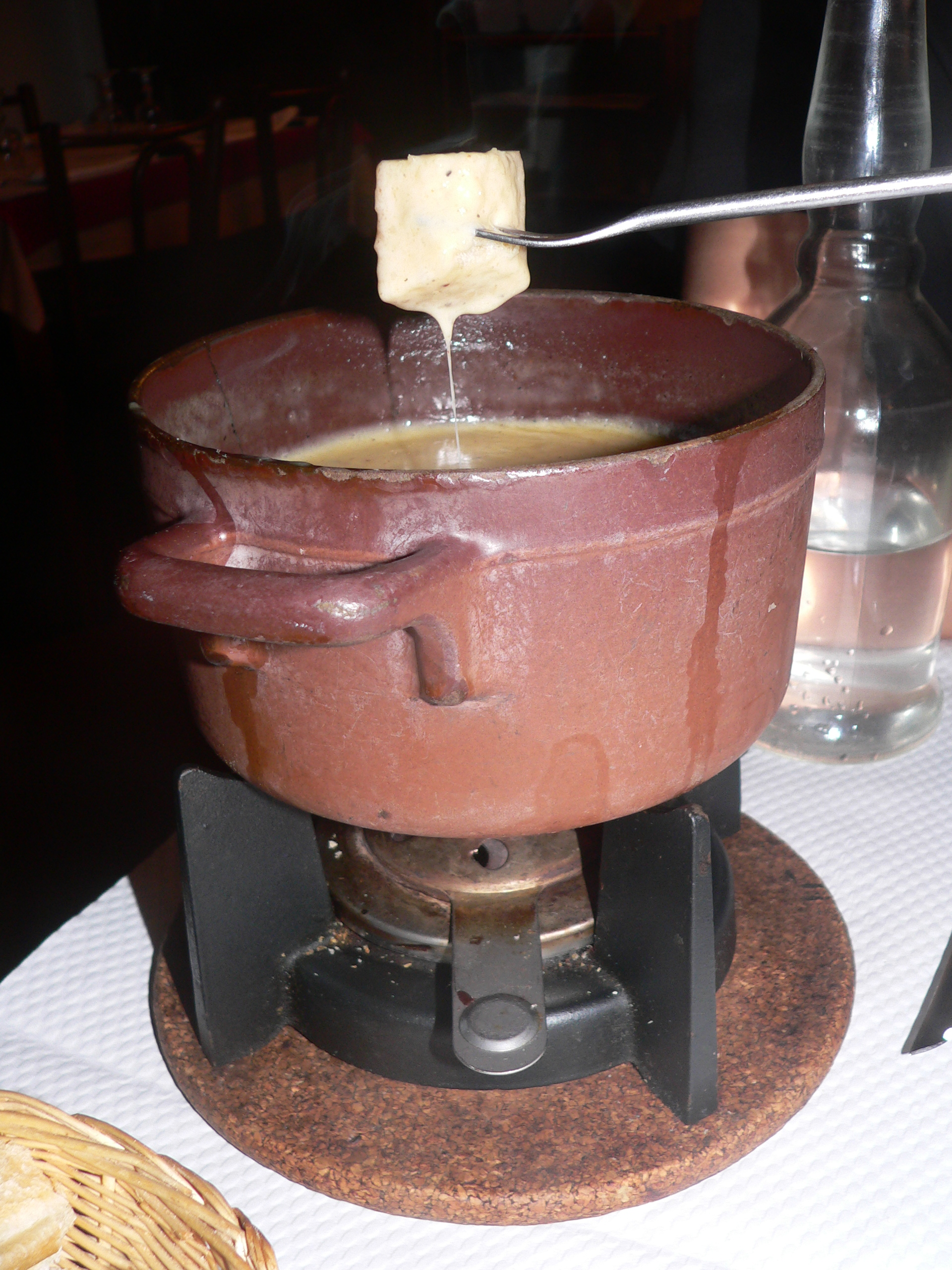
Swiss cheese fondue

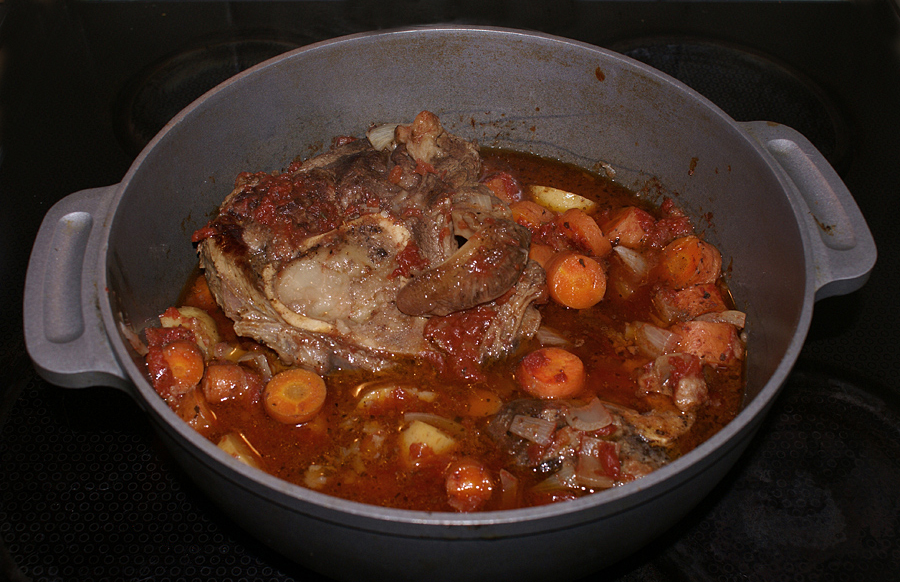
Osso bucco

=== Nutrition facts ===
Nutrition	Unit	Value for 100 g
Water	g	~ 86.86
Energy	kcal	~ 82
Protein	g	~ 0.07
Total lipid (Fat)	g	0.00
Carbohydrates	g	~ 2.60
Sugars	g	~ 0.96

Source: US government

== Health effects ==
Because of its shorter maceration, white wine contains very little tannin and therefore little antioxidants. However, a team of researchers from Montpellier has developed a white wine enriched with polyphenols. The sulfur dioxide additive commonly used in wine is not harmful in the amounts used but its effects are feared among asthmatics: it can cause the onset of a crisis. Symptoms such as difficulty breathing, migraine, or stomach heat sensation may indicate an intolerance. A reaction caused by a deficiency of sulfite oxidase (the enzyme that breaks down sulfur dioxide) is very rare. Studies are underway to investigate whether some of the symptoms attributed to sulfur dioxide could not come from another molecule present in the wine. White wine is an acidic beverage with a pH ranging from 2.8 to 3.6. This acidity is an aggressive element to tooth enamel. In addition it contains ethanol which is expressed in degrees or percentage. This compound can cause cirrhosis, which can occur from a regular consumption of 20 grams per day for women and 40 grams per day for men. However, some studies in California may indicate beneficial effect of wine at a low daily dose for non-alcoholic cirrhosis.

In recent studies white wine was indicated to have some cardiovascular benefits. As well, white wine contains antioxidants, although red wine contains higher levels of antioxidants. Both white and red wines are effective in preventing LDL oxidation.

== In art ==
=== Painted or drawn white wine ===
Since the Middle Ages white wine has inspired many painters to include it in still lifes for the representation of the everyday life, party life, or life to excess. An abundance of English, Dutch and German paintings from the 17th century depicted a high consumption of white wine at that time replacing the consumption of beer in the aristocracy and the bourgeoisie.

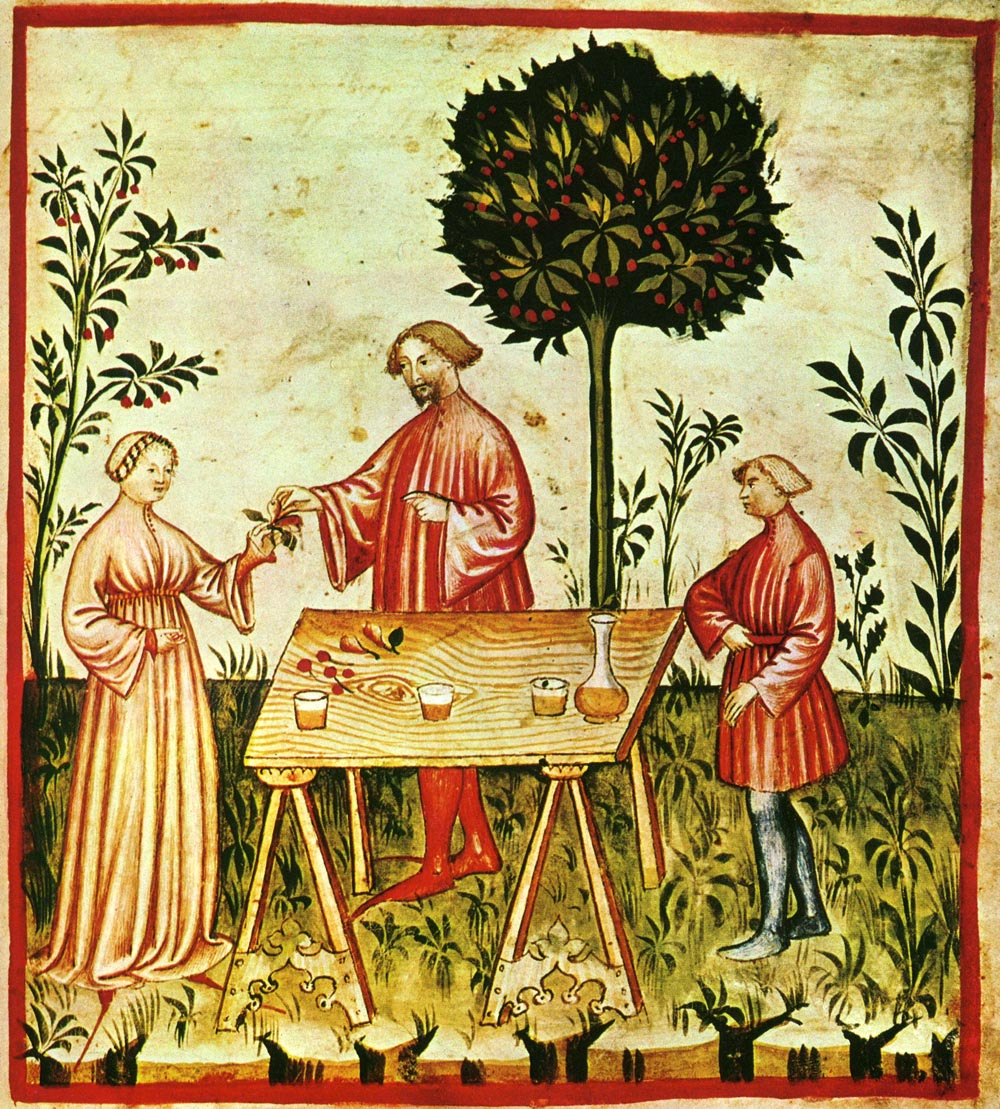
Tacuinum Sanitatis, 14th century

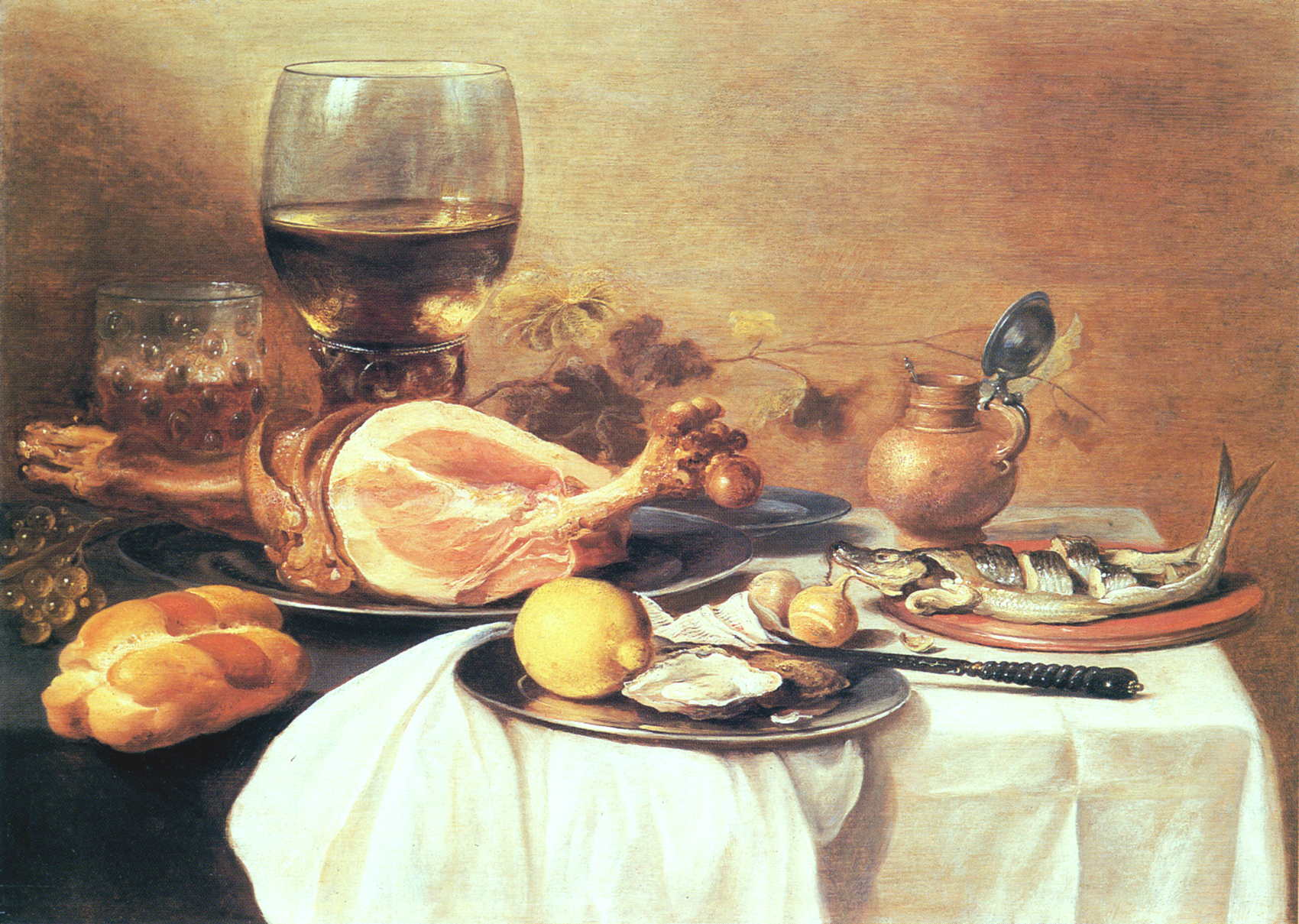
Pieter Claesz, Still life with a glass of roemer, 1645

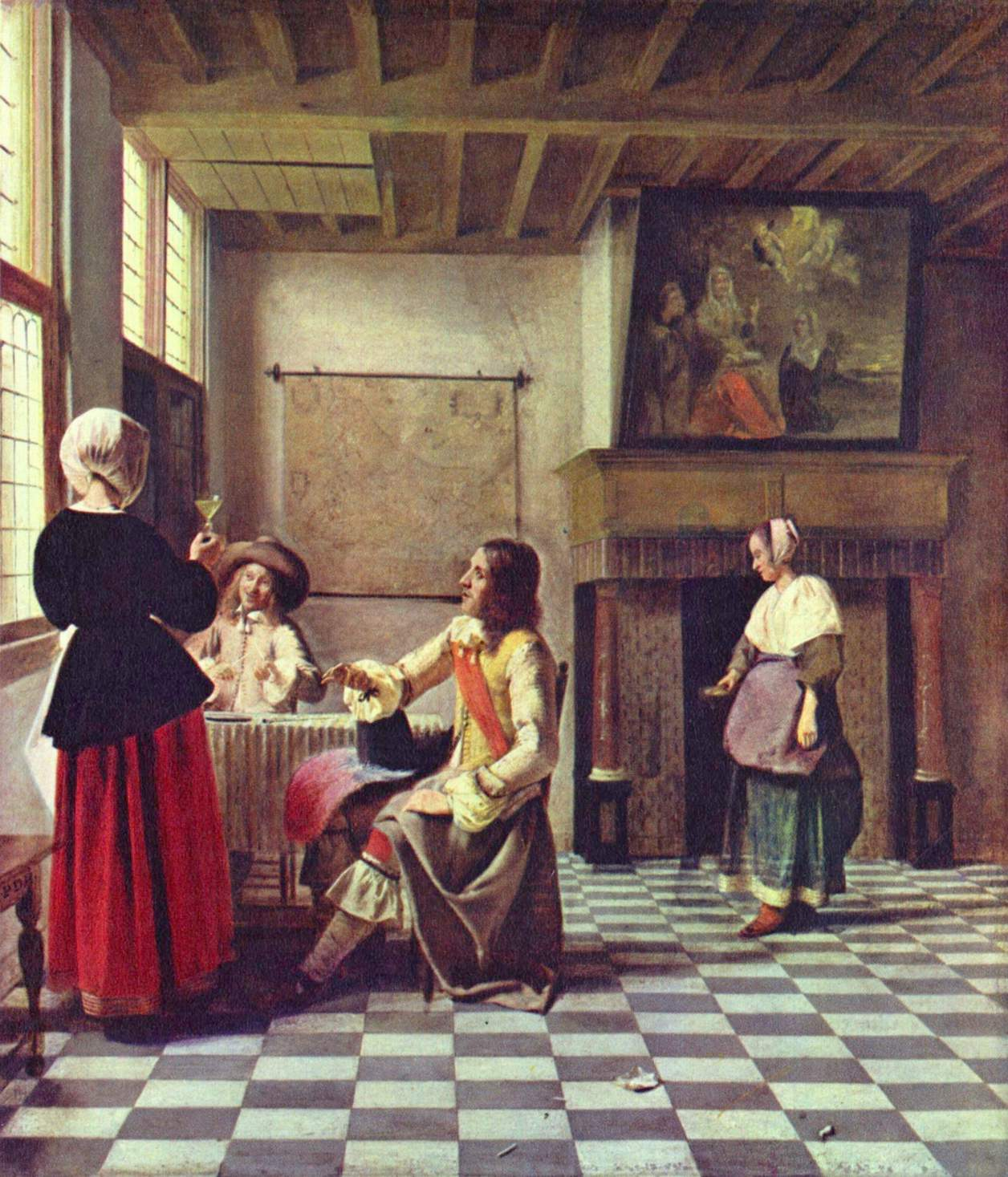
Pieter de Hooch, Wife and Husband toasting, 1658

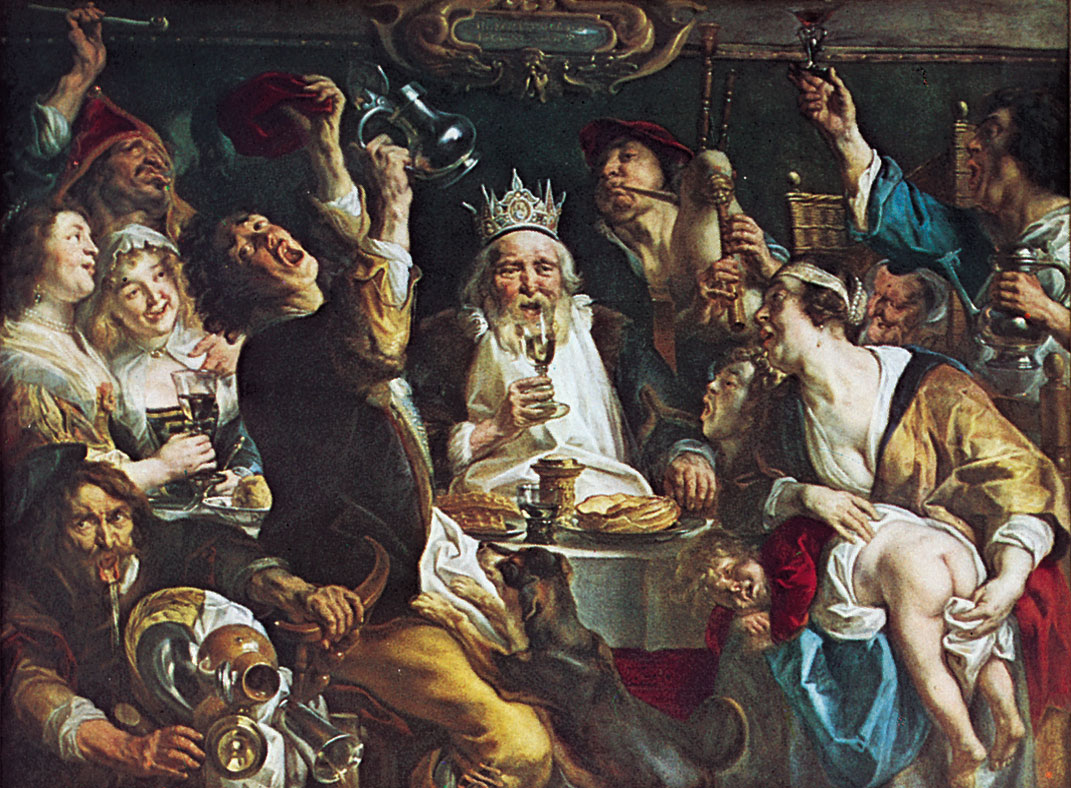
Jacob Jordaens, The King drinks, 17th century

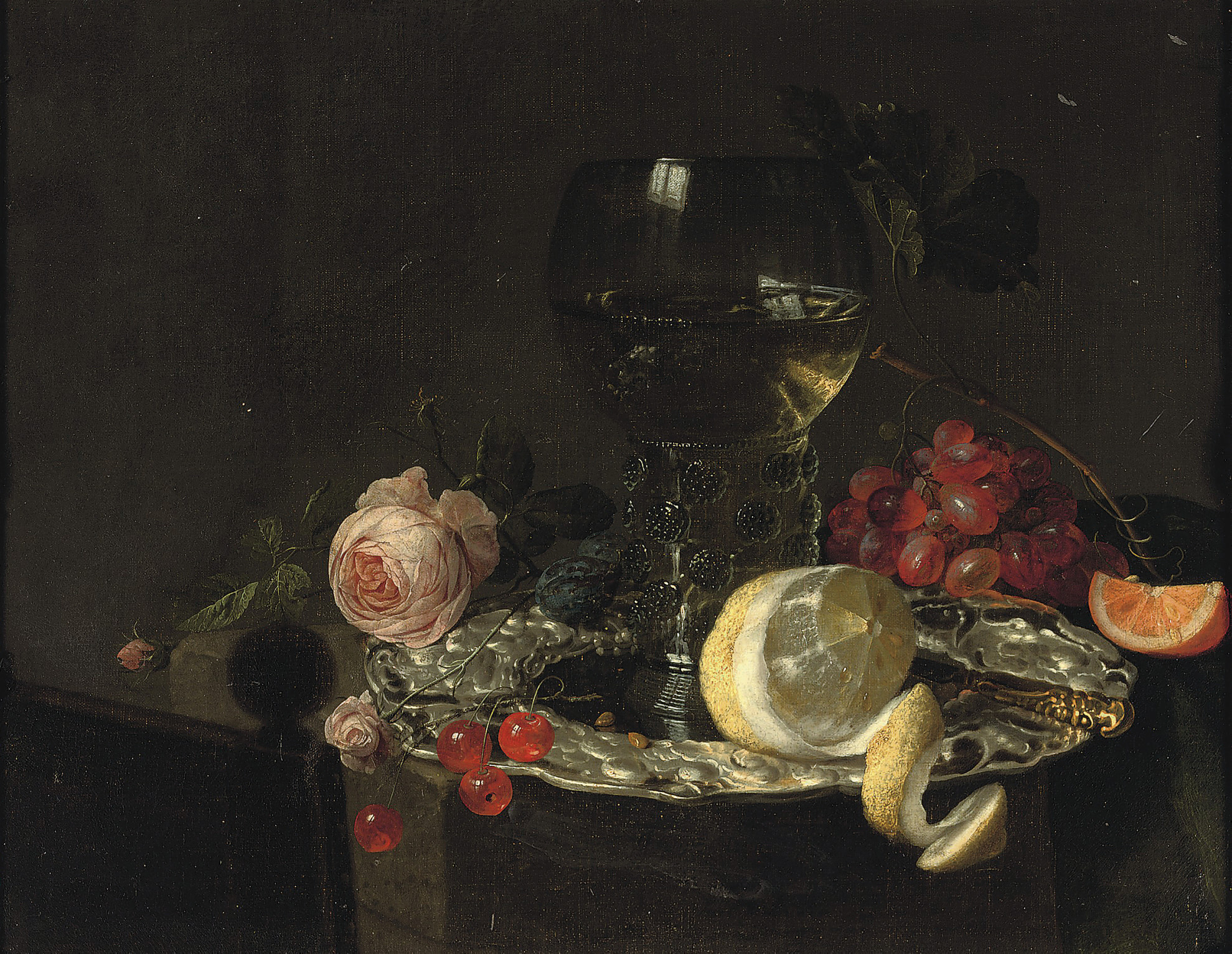
Simon Luttichuys and Cornelis de Heem, Still life, 17th century

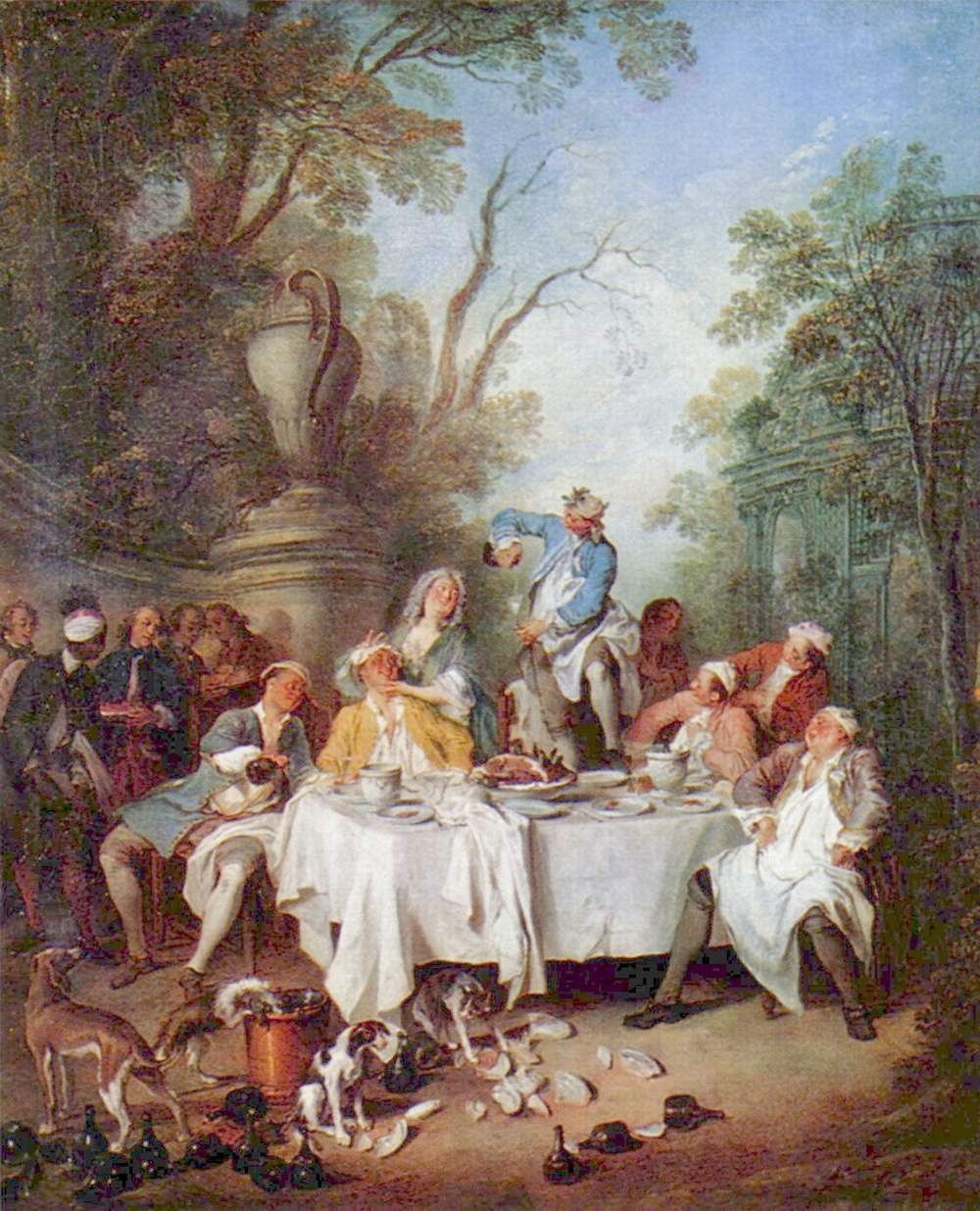
Nicolas Lancret, Lunch of Ham, 1735

Peder Severin Krøyer, Hip hip hurra! - Festival of Painters at Skagen, 1888

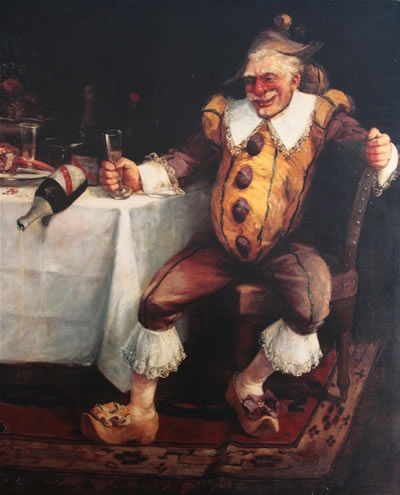
Joseph Faverot, The Drunken buffoon, 1894

White wine has also inspired designers, cartoonists, advertising etc.

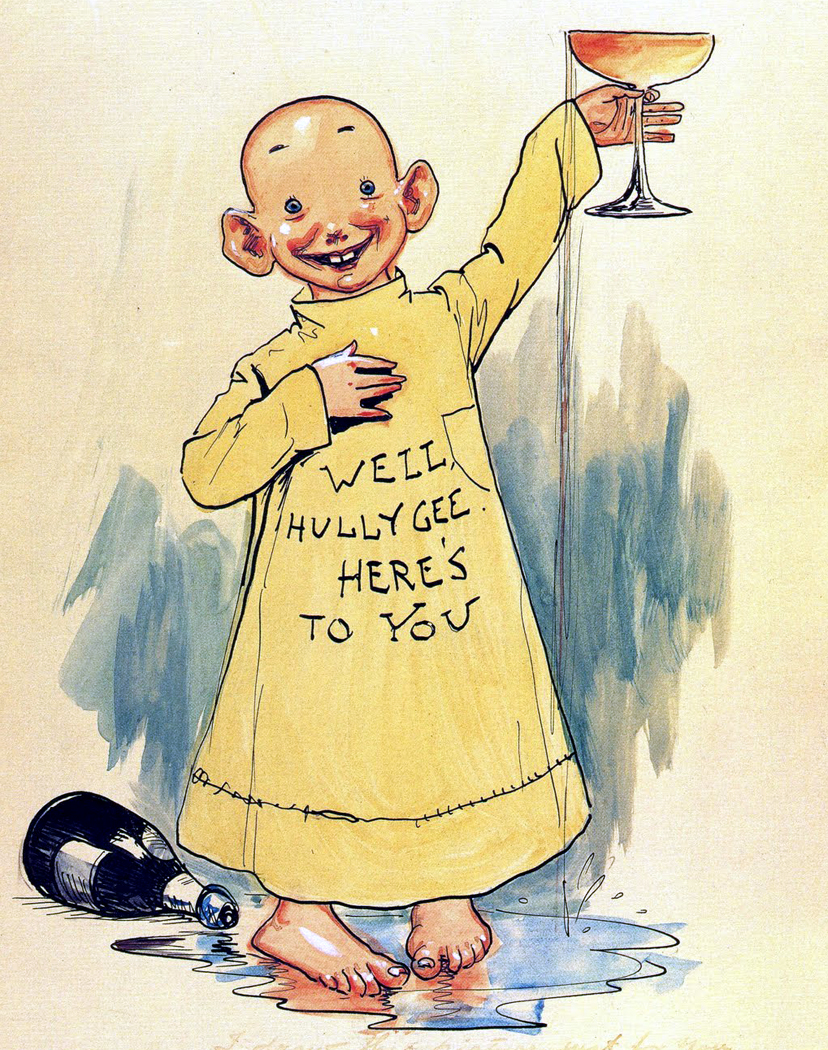
The comic artist also used white wine in his illustrations.

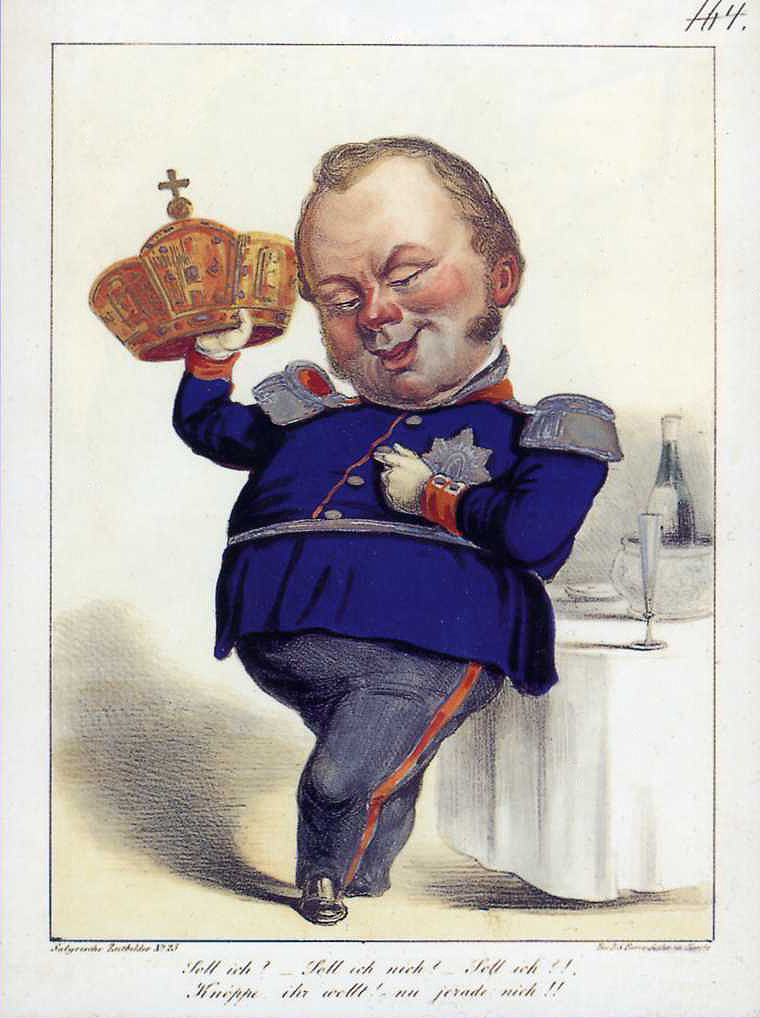
German caricature of 1849

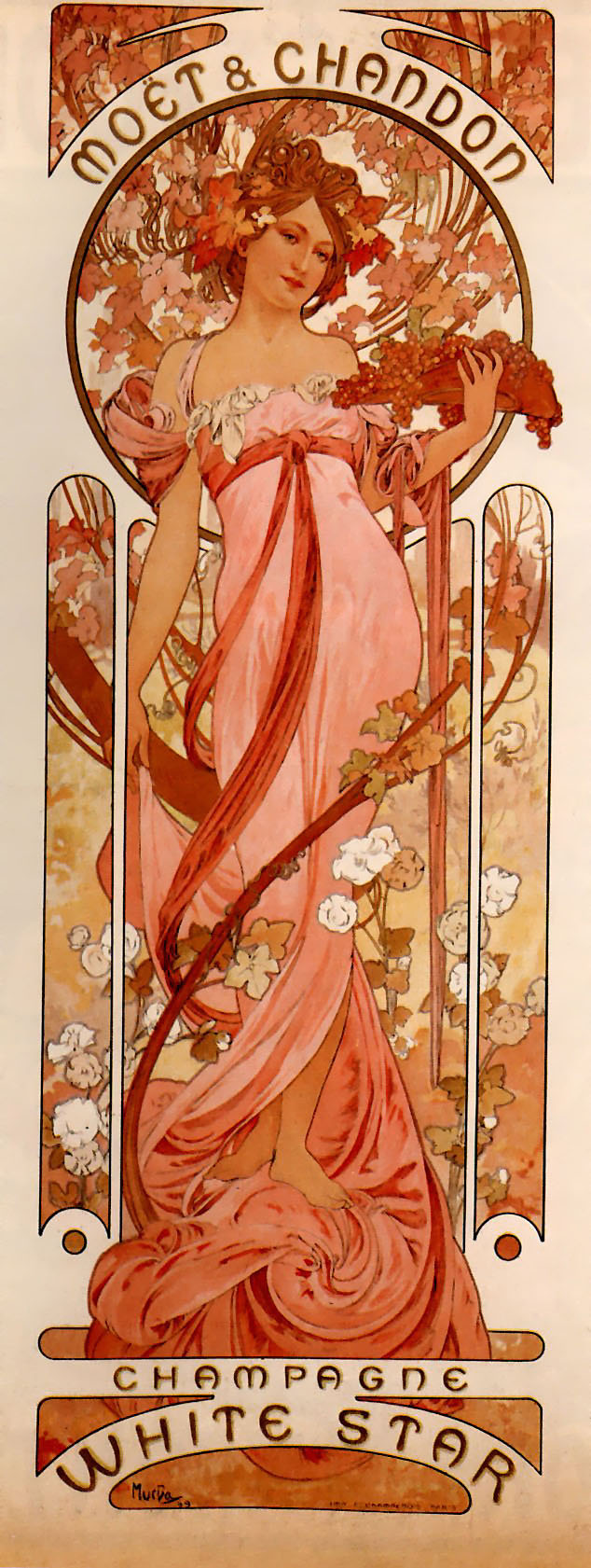
Advertising in the Belle Époque

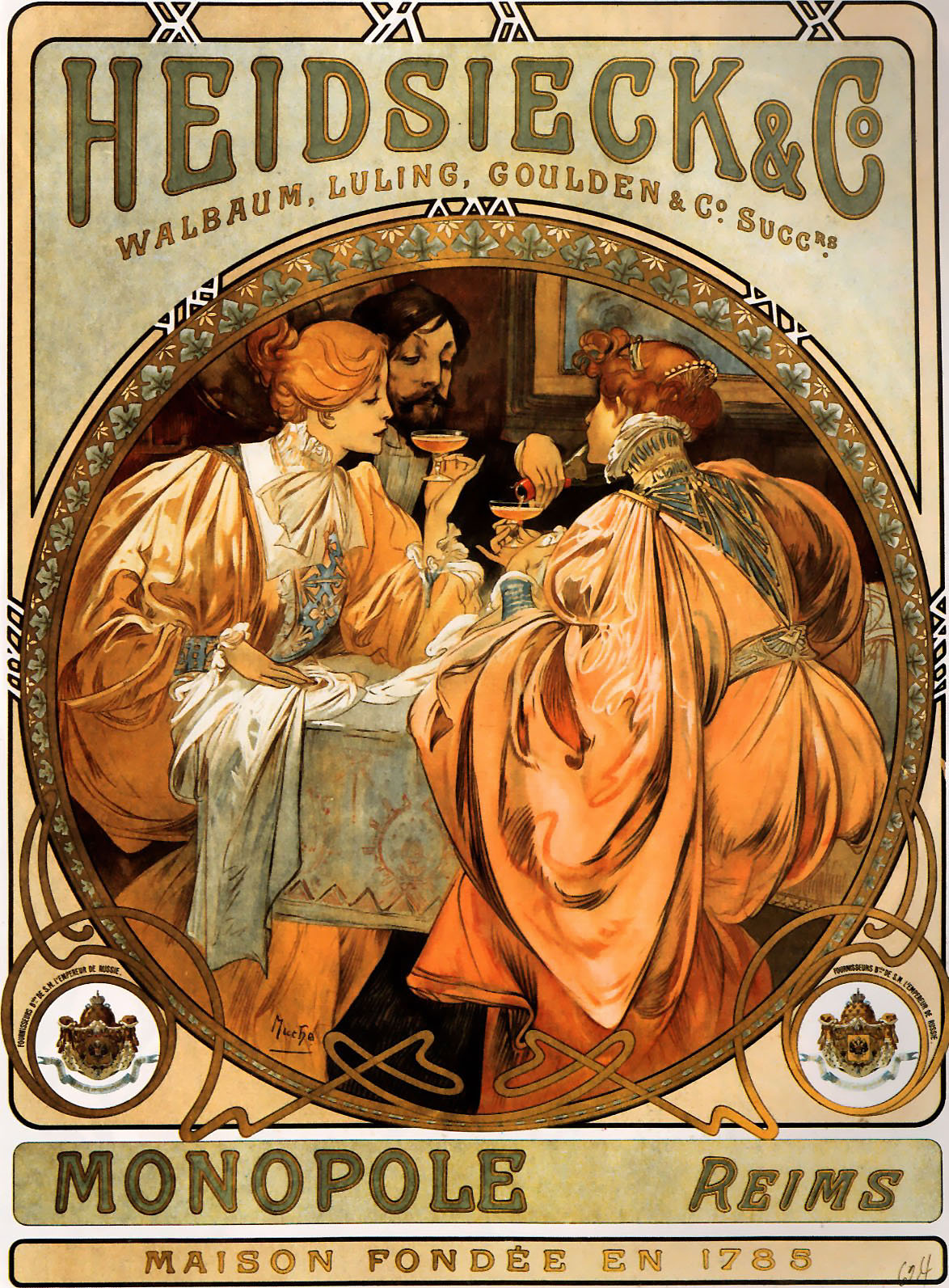
Advertising in 1901

=== In literature ===
A number of authors, poets, and philosophers have celebrated wine in general but the quotes are become much more rare when it comes to include color. Authors in all eras have spoken using white wine to illustrate their point. Serious or tinged with humor white wine is present in all kinds of works, novels, poetry, and philosophy itself. The white wine commonly cited in literature is French champagne.

François Rabelais, an angevin bon vivant, repeatedly celebrated the white wine of Anjou that he liked and it was appreciated by his literary heroes.

"Jumping, dancing, touring – and drinking white wine and rose – and do nothing every day – What counts as crowns of the sun" - François Rabelais

During the Enlightenment, Voltaire and Casanova celebrated wine parties, drunk at fine tables.

"Every guest had at his right a bottle that could be white wine or mead. I know I drank ... of the excellent white burgundy" - Casanova

"From this fresh wine the sparkling foam
For our French it is a brilliant image" - Voltaire

White wine is also used in humour, in a drama with Marcel Pagnol or in a gossip radio show for Pierre Desproges.

"Serve me a bottle of white wine if it is fresh.
- If it is fresh? Touch me there! Looks like it comes from the vineyards of the North Pole!" - Marcel Pagnol

"In June at the fish market, one does not loiter anymore: one strolls. Behind the port, the cherry tomato is nowhere to be seen at the farmers market stall. One munches them with salt on the sand with a basil branch and a glass of Brem iced white wine" - Pierre Desproges

Michel Onfray has written a book based on the Sauternes. Partly on wine and its land, its philosophical reflection outweighs the viticultural theme.

=== In song ===
White wine celebrated by poets was sometimes set to music. The most famous white wine in relation to a song is probably: Ah! the white wine by Jean Dréjac and Charles Borel-Clerc.

A touch of champagne is a song by Harry Fragson written about 1890.

I am Drunk, sung by Louis Byrec and written by Yvette Guilbert in 1895 gave the best part to knowledge of sparkling wines:

"I come to the wedding of my sister Annette
And, when the champagne is flowing,
I could not hold you, I am tipsy,
and I pinched my little tuft.
I feel flageoler I feel my legsM
I have the heart guil'ret, the pleasing air
I am ready to cavort
When I drank Moet et Chandon".

Even some varieties are mentioned in song such as the song entitled Sauvignon by Hubert Lapaire in 1926:

"I dounn'rais the burgundy vou the Burgundian
And all your sacred champagne wines
for a little keg of sauvignon
Who gilds the cotiau of nout campaign
It is v'louteux it is blondin
It is of the little wine franch'ment kind ...
If bin before St. Martin J'mettrons the throat under the champ'lure"

Closer to home Boris Vian celebrated "Muscadet in green glasses, a fresh wine, What cheers" in his song Mechanical Music. Jacques Higelin wrote the song Champagne on his album Champagne for everyone:

"Seek me without delay the friend who treats and cures the madness with me and has never betrayed me. Champagne!!"

== See also ==
- Classification of wine
- Classification of Champagne vineyards
- Glossary of wine terms
- List of grape varieties
- List of wine-producing countries
- Outline of wine (Links to many other related articles)

== Notes and references ==
=== Bibliography ===
- (France) Yves Renouil (dir.), Dictionary of Wine, Féret et fils, Bordeaux, 1962
- Sopexa, Wine and Spirits of France, Le Carrousel, Paris, 1989, ISBN 2-907504-00-2
- (France) Collective work, The Vine and the Wine, Éditions la manufacture et la cité des sciences et de l'industrie, 1988, Lyon, ISBN 2-7377-0120-1, Part "Vinification in white" written by Denis Dubourdieu, p. 170 and 171
- (France) Jean-Luc Berger, The Procedures of Wine-making, The vine and the wine, pages 76–77, No. 155, Science & Vie magazine, September 1986, Éditions Exelsior, Paris, ISSN 0151-0282
- (France) Pascal Ribéreau-Gayon, Yves Glories, Alain Maujean, Denis Dubourdieu; Traits of Enology : Chemistry of Wine, stabilization and treatments, Dunod, October 2000, ISBN 2-10-003948-2

=== Notes ===
==== Main Sources ====
- (France) Guide to Grape Varieties, 300 varieties and their vines, Ambrosi, Dettweiler-Münch, Rühl, Schmid, and Schuman; ULMER, 1997 ISBN 2-84138-059-9, 320 pages
- (France) Hugh Johnson, A World History of Wine from Antiquity to Modern Times, Hachette, 1990, ISBN 2-01-015867-9, 464 pages
- Collective work, The Hachette Guide to the Wines of France 2010, Hachette pratique, August 2009, ISBN 978-2-01-237514-7
- Catalogue of varieties and clones of grapevines grown in France, ENTAV – INRA – ENSAM – ONIVINS, ENTAV and Ministry of Agriculture and Fisheries, 1995, ISBN 2-9509682-0-1
