= Château Dubignon =

French wine producer

Coordinates: 45.04131°N 0.67649°W

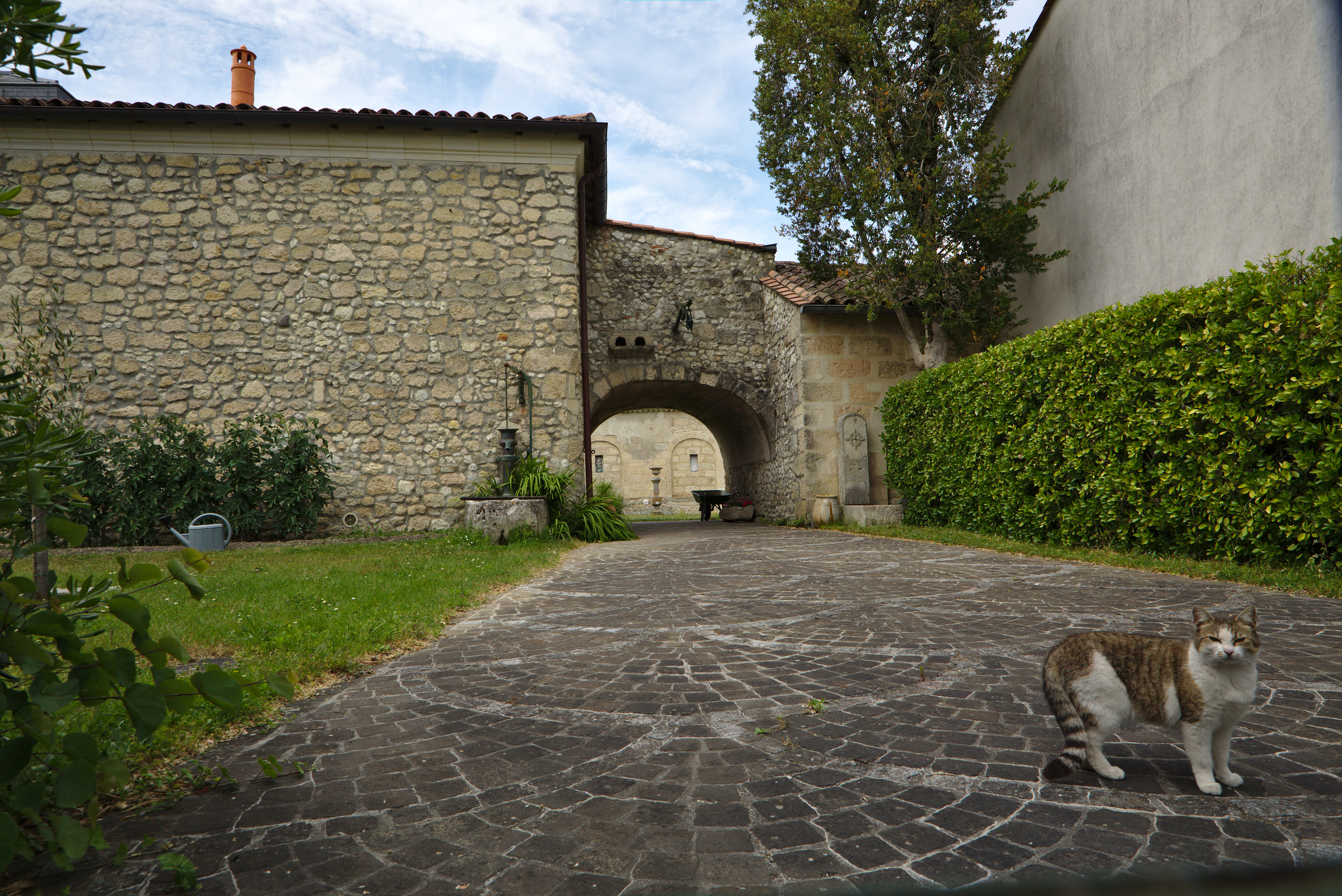
Château Larruau's side entrance

Château Dubignon, later Château Dubignon-Talbot, later Château Larruau, is a wine producer in the appellation of Margaux in the Bordeaux wine region of France. The estate was classified as a Troisième Cru (Third Growth) in the Bordeaux Wine Official Classification of 1855, and was during its time considered the smallest cru of all.

With the phylloxera epidemic, production at Dubignon ceased. Sold by the proprietor Philippe Dubignon to Monsieur Fourcade in the 1870s, it was absorbed into his estate Château Malescot St. Exupéry, and the estate ceased to exist.

When Malescot St. Exupéry changed ownership in 1901, the plot of the Dubignon estate, renamed Dubignon-Talbot was again separated from Malescot St. Exupéry. It was then revived, being allowed admitted to the ranks of Bourgeois supérieurs as an ancien troisième cru, as it was listed in the 1949 edition of Cocks & Féret.

In 1960 Dubignon-Talbot was acquired by a consortium of buyers consisting of Paul Zuger, Pierre Ginestet and Jean Cordier. The small vineyard was divided between Zuger and Ginestet, coming to Zuger's Malescot St. Exupéry and Ginestet's châteaux Margaux and Durfort-Vivens, and Cordier claiming the estate name laid to rest to avoid any confusion with his Château Talbot.

In the 1970s, Bernard Chateau acquired the estate. He renamed it Château Larruau, after the part of Margaux where the former Dubignon-Talbot Castle was located.
