= Château Coutet =

Coordinates: 44.59476°N 0.32595°W

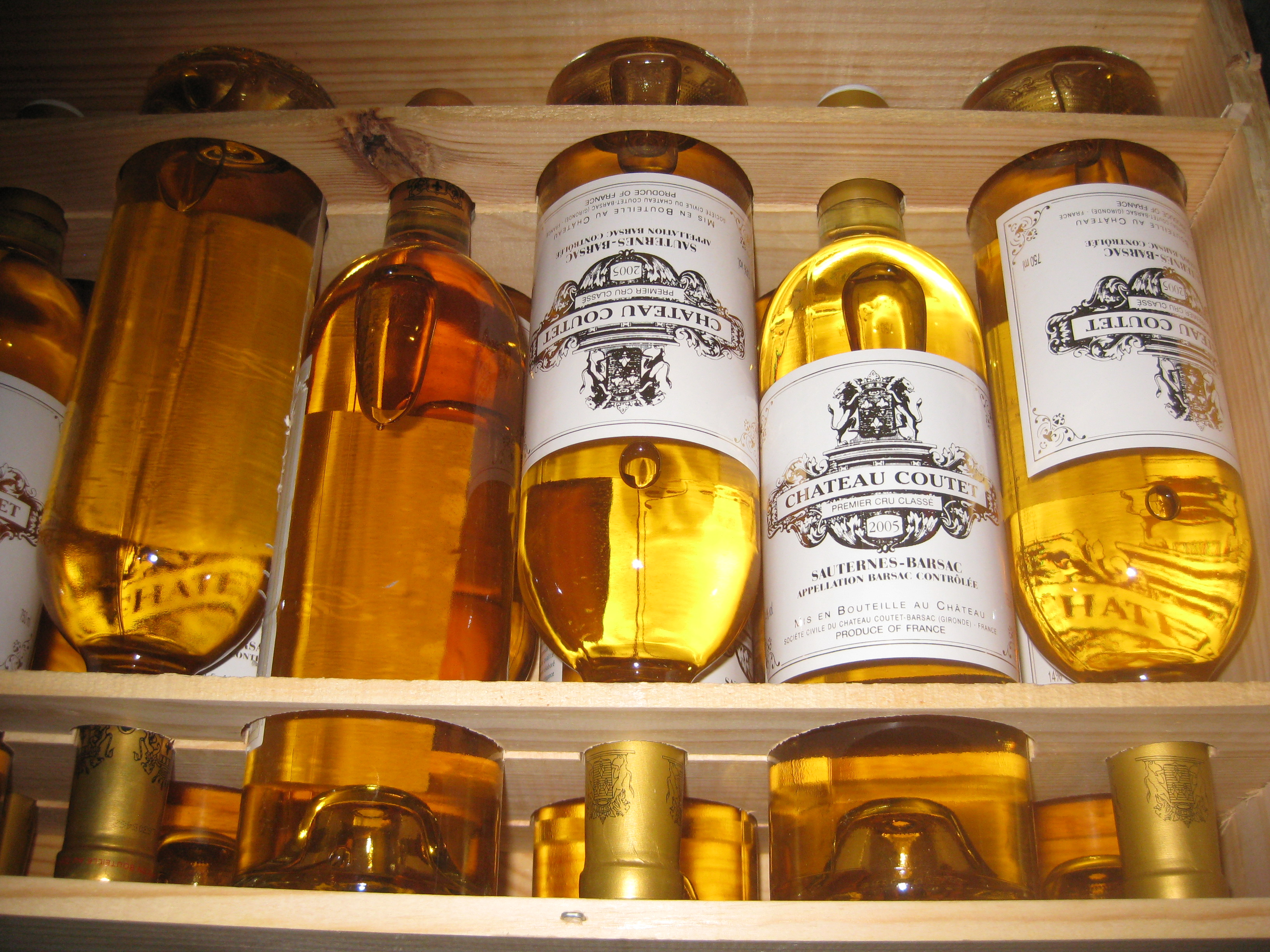
A case of Château Coutet bottles.

Château Coutet is a Premier Cru Classé (French: First Growth) sweet wine from the Sauternes-Barsac appellation located in Barsac, in the southern part of France's Bordeaux vineyards. Château Coutet is one of the oldest Sauternes producing vineyards, and is described by David Peppercorn as a "twin" of Barsac's other Premier cru estate, Château Climens.

Coutet also produces a second wine, Chartreuse de Coutet, a dry white wine named Vin Sec de Chateau Coutet and a cuvée in vintages of exceptional quality, Cuvée Madame.

== History ==
The estate was acquired in 1643 by Charles le Guerin, Lord of Coutet, a counselor at the Bordeaux parliament. In 1695 he passed the estate on to his nephew, Jean le Pichard, whose descendants owned Coutet until 1788. It was at this time that the former US president Thomas Jefferson noted Coutet as the best Sauternes originating from Barsac.

Coutet was later acquired by Gabriel-Barthelemy-Romain de Filhot, president of the Bordeaux parliament and a cousin of the former owner. As a consequence of the French Revolution, Château Coutet was seized by the state in 1794 and de Filhot was beheaded. Château Coutet was inherited later on by Marquis Romain Bertrand de Lur Saluces, son of Marie-Geneviève de Filhot and Antoine-Marie de Lur Saluces. De Lur Saluces was also at the time owner of Château d'Yquem, Château Filhot and Château de Malle and thus the largest producer of sweet white wines in the world.

Château Coutet remained under the care of the de Lur Saluces family until 1923. At this point Henry-Louis Guy, a hydraulic wine press manufacturer from Lyon, purchased Château Coutet. This transaction separated the estate from Château d'Yquem. Guy equipped the winery with his vertical presses, still used today at each harvest. In 1977, the Baly family purchased the property remaining present day owners. In 1994, Coutet signed an agreement with Philippine de Rothschild giving exclusive distribution rights to Baron Philippe de Rothschild S.A.

=== Architecture ===
Standing over the main courtyard, the château's square tower is believed to originate from the late 13th century with a design typical to the military constructions from the time of Aquitaine's English occupation. A second tower, located in the property's northern plot, is another example of the era's architecture. This landmark was built originally to breed pigeons and peacocks for region's Gascon lords. Further elements from other centuries define the property's architecture, including a 14th-century chapel and two 16th-century towers.

The architecture of the oldest part of the château is identical to that of Château d'Yquem, and the well in the courtyard an exact duplicate.

Coutet is also home to the longest Sauternes winery with a 110 metres long cellar that houses more than 860 barrels.

== Production ==
Located between the Garonne and Ciron rivers, Château Coutet benefits from a microclimate whose autumn mists necessary for the spread of the Botrytis cinerea. The vineyard area extends 38 hectares with grape varieties of 75% Sémillon, 23% Sauvignon blanc and 2% Muscadelle.

On average 4,500 cases are produced each year of the Grand vin Château Coutet. Additionally there is produced the second wine Chartreuse de Coutet from the estate's younger vines, and a dry white wine named Vin Sec de Château Coutet. In infrequent vintages of exceptional quality, a precise berry-by-berry selection wine is produced named Cuvée Madame. First created by Edmond Rolland in honour of his wife in 1922, it typically has a production of 700 cases.
