= Suau =

Suau may refer to:

- Suau language of Papua New Guinea
- Suau Rural LLG of Papua New Guinea

== People ==
- Anthony Suau
- Paloma Suau
- Jean Suau

== Wine ==
- Château Suau
- Château Suau (Capian)
