= Château Suau =

Coordinates: 44.69405°N 0.32430°W

Château Suau is a sweet white wine ranked as Second Cru Classé (French, “Second Growth”) in the original Bordeaux Wine Official Classification of 1855. Belonging to the Sauternes appellation in Gironde, in the region of Graves, the winery is located in the commune of Barsac.

Not to be confused with Château Suau (Capian) located in the commune of Capian.
