= Bordeaux Wine Official Classification of 1855 =

Ranking system for Bordeaux wine set in 1855

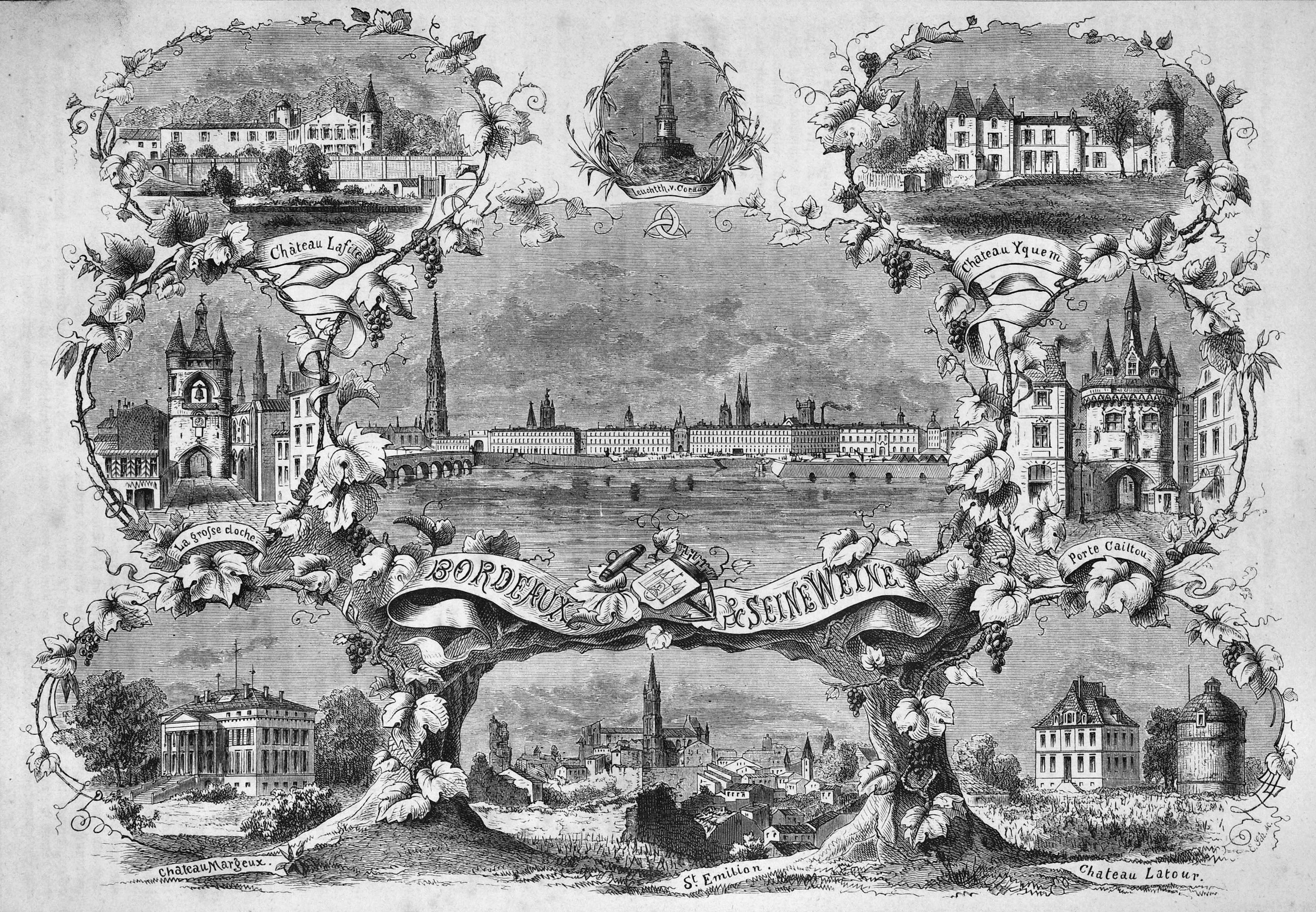
Châteaux of Bordeaux

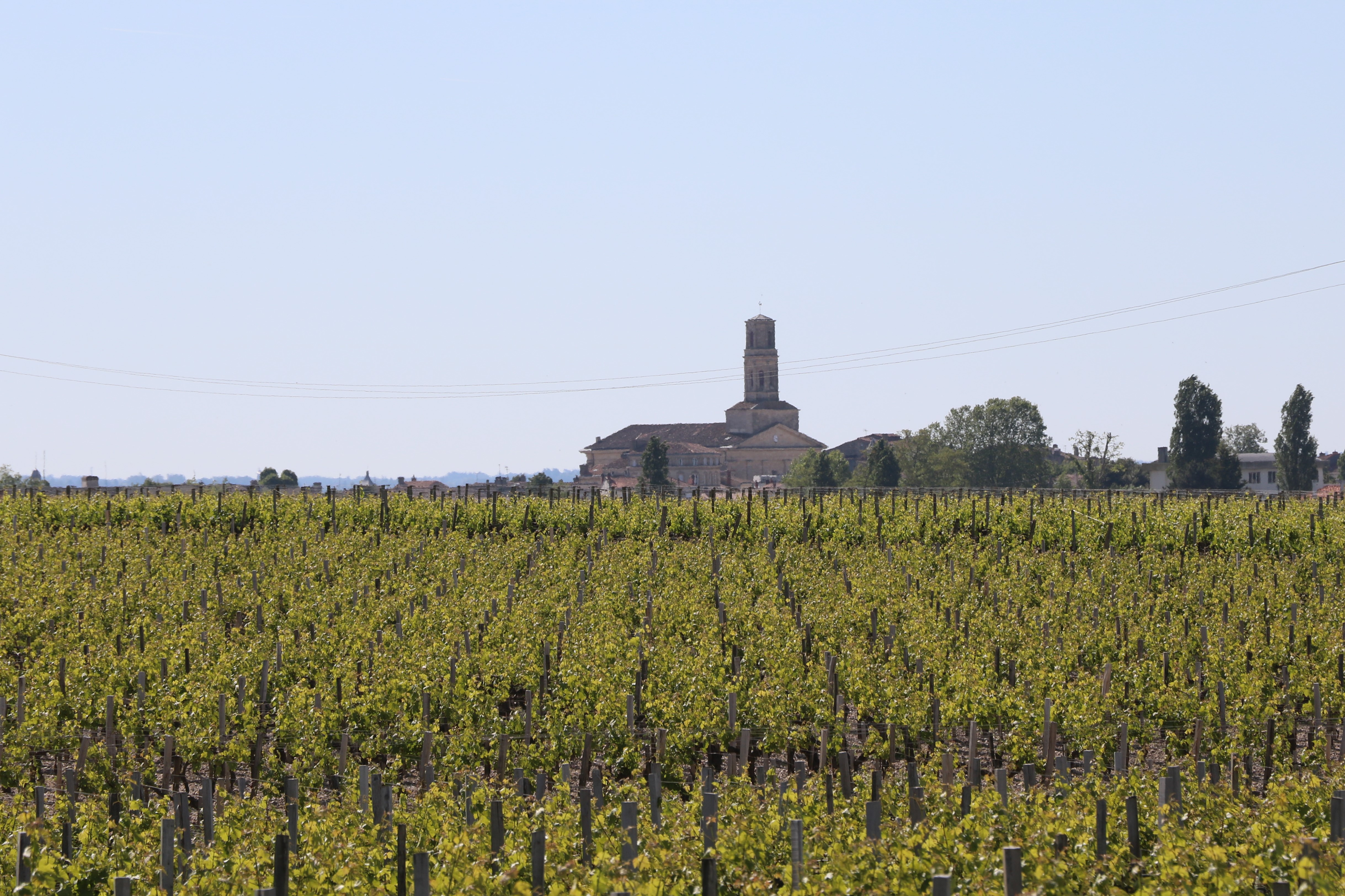
Pauillac is home to three of the five Bordeaux's first growth wines (classification of 1855)

The Bordeaux Wine Official Classification of 1855 resulted from the 1855 Exposition Universelle de Paris, when Emperor Napoleon III requested a classification system for France's best Bordeaux wines that were to be on display for visitors from around the world. Brokers from the wine industry ranked the wines according to a château's reputation and trading price.

The wines were ranked in importance from first to fifth growths (crus). All of the red wines that made it on the list came from the Médoc region except for one: Château Haut-Brion from Graves. The white wines, then of much less importance than red wine, were limited to the sweet varieties of Sauternes and Barsac and were ranked only from superior first growth to second growth.

== Changes to the classification ==
Within each category, the various châteaux are ranked in order of quality and only twice since the 1855 classification has there been a change: first when in 1856 Cantemerle was added as a fifth growth (having either been originally omitted by oversight or added as an afterthought, depending on which of the conflicting accounts is correct) and, more significantly, in 1973, when Château Mouton Rothschild was elevated from a second growth to a first growth vineyard after decades of intense lobbying by the powerful Philippe de Rothschild. A third, but less known "change", is the removal of Château Dubignon, a third growth from Margaux that was absorbed into the estate Château Malescot St. Exupéry.

A superficial change is that since 1855, when only five of the estates were styled with the word "château" in their name, most Bordeaux wine estates now use this nomenclature.

== Critique ==
As a classification of châteaux, the actual vineyards owned by some wineries have expanded, shrunk and been divided without any reclassification, and considerable plots of valued terroir have changed ownership. Indeed, it is a peculiarity of Bordeaux that as long as a vineyard parcel lies within the boundaries of the wine commune, it is eligible to be used by any château, independent of the quality of the parcel itself.

Many wine critics have argued that the 1855 Classification has become outdated and does not provide an accurate guide to the quality of the wines being made on each estate. Several proposals have been made for changes to the classification, and a bid for a revision was unsuccessfully attempted in 1960. Alexis Lichine, a member of the 1960 revision panel, launched a campaign to implement changes that lasted over thirty years, in the process publishing several editions of his own unofficial classification and the Alexis Lichine's Guide to the Wines and Vineyards of France, in which he devoted a chapter to the subject. In support of his argument, Lichine cited the case of Chateau Lynch-Bages, the Pauillac Fifth Growth that, through good management and by patiently collecting the best parcels as they come on the market, makes wine that in his view are worthy of a much higher classification. Conversely, poor management can result in a significant decline in quality, as the example of Château Margaux shows—the wines it made in the 1960s and 1970s are widely regarded as far below what is expected of a first growth. Other critics have followed a similar suit, including Robert Parker who published a top 100 Bordeaux estates in 1985 and L'histoire de la vigne et du vin (English: The History of Wine and the Vine) by Bernard and Henri Enjalbert in 1989, as well as efforts made by Clive Coates (MW) and David Peppercorn (MW). Ultimately nothing has come of them; the likely negative impact on prices for any downgraded châteaux and the 1855 establishment's political muscle are considered among the reasons.

In March 2009, the British wine exchange Liv-ex released The Liv-ex Bordeaux Classification, a modern re-calculation of the 1855 classification, with an aim to apply the original method to the contemporary economical context.

Many of the leading estates from the Médoc appellation that were not included in the 1855 classification are classified as Cru Bourgeois, a classification system that has been updated on a regular basis since 1932, declared illegal by the DGCCRF (French competition and fraud authority) in 2007, but reinstated in 2010.

== The Médoc Classification of 1855 ==
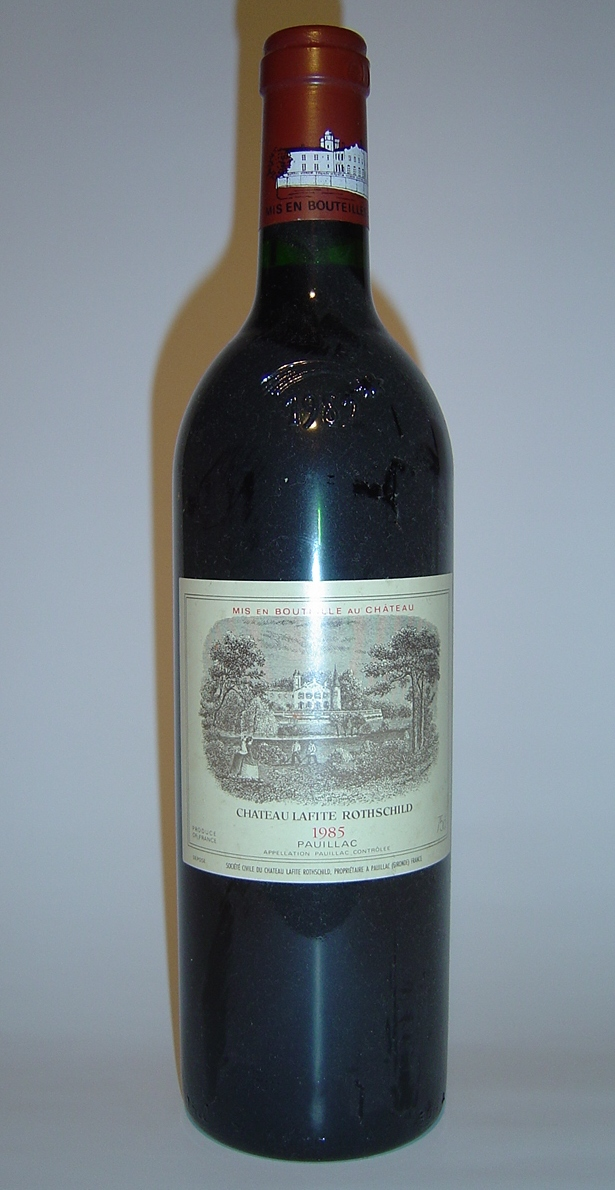
Château Lafite-Rothschild

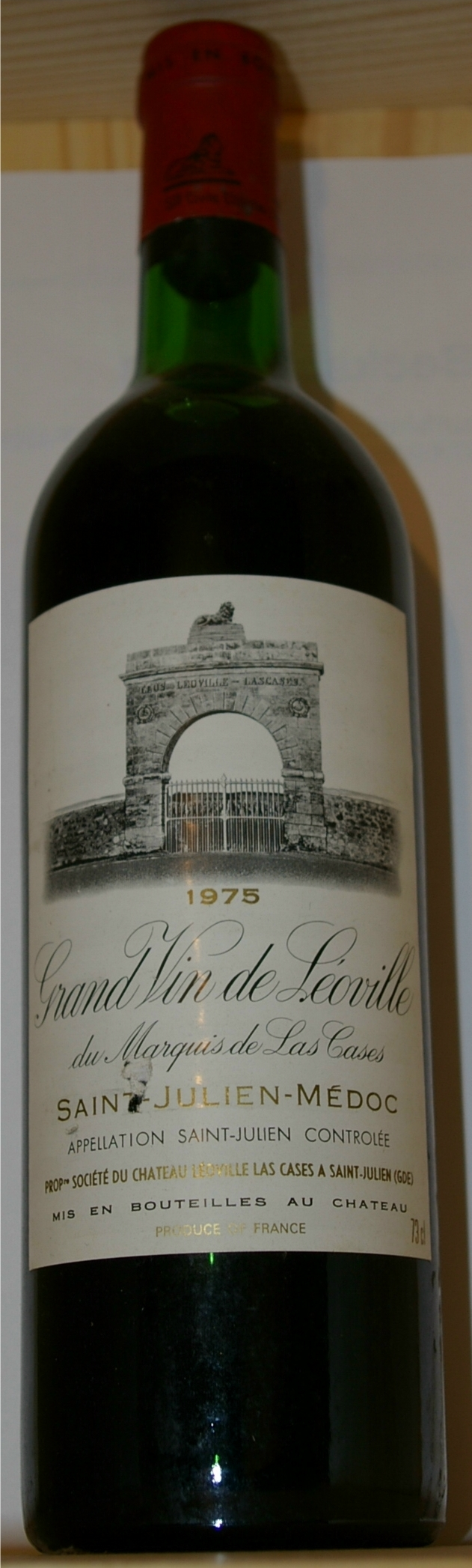
Château Léoville-Las Cases

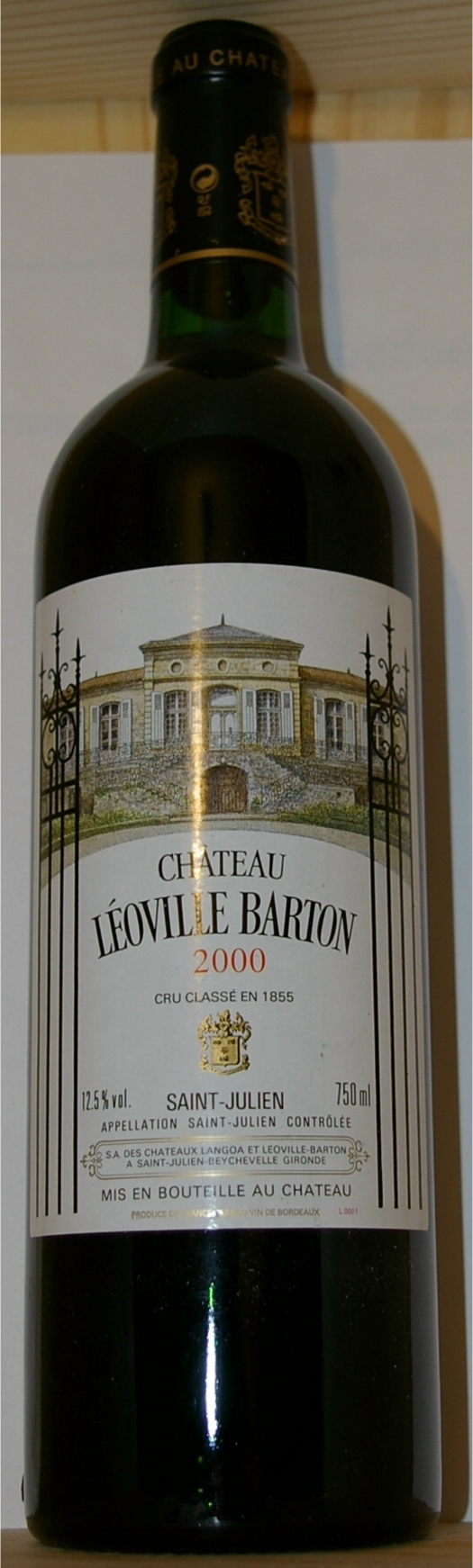
Château Léoville-Barton

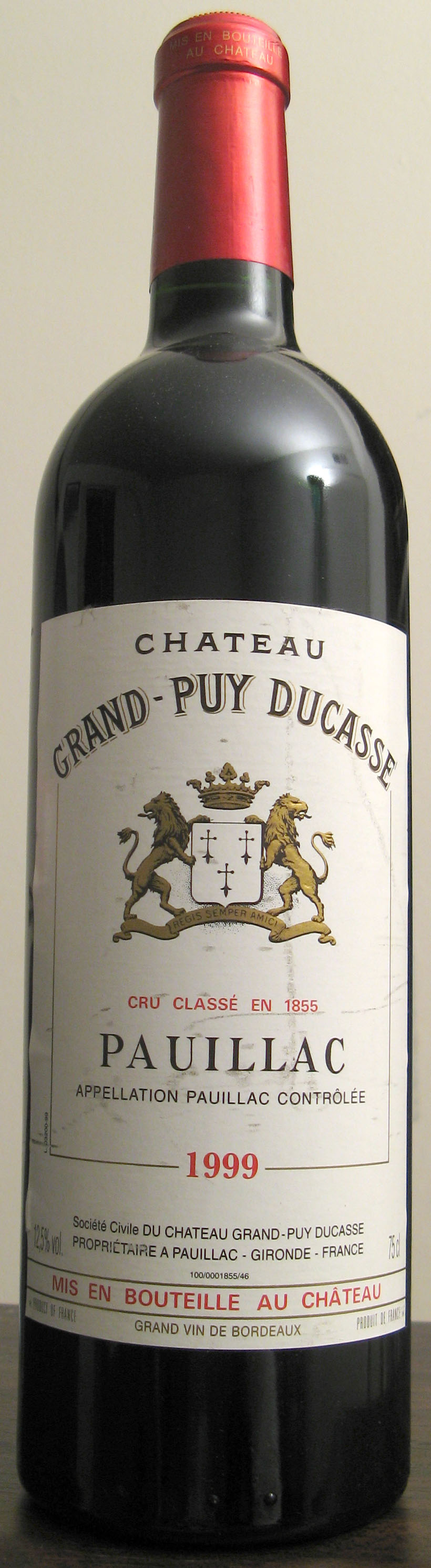
Château Grand-Puy-Ducasse

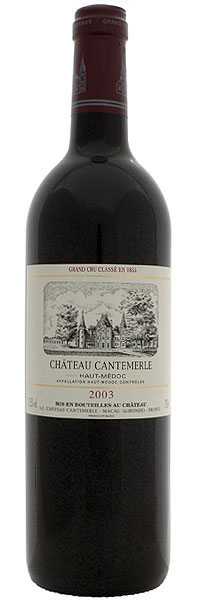
Château Cantemerle

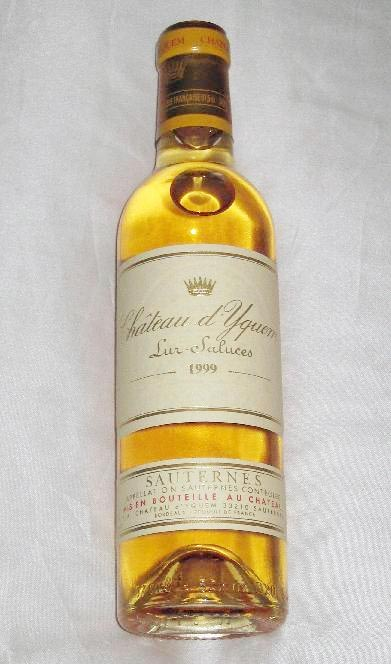
Château d’Yquem

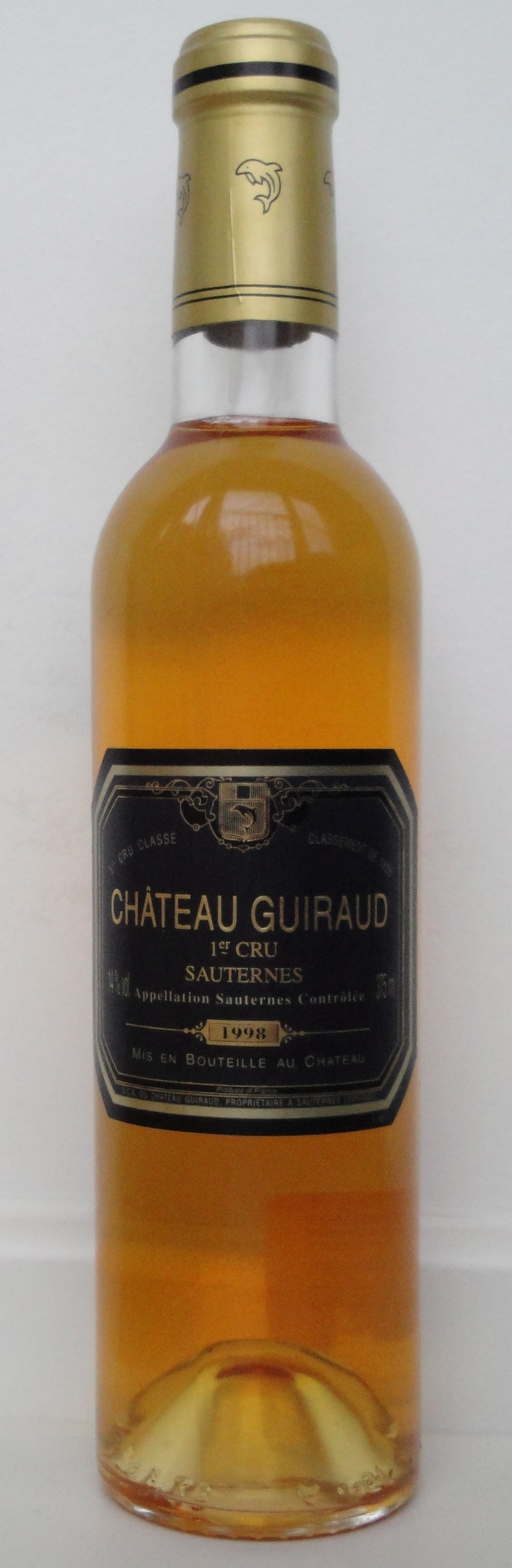
Château Guiraud

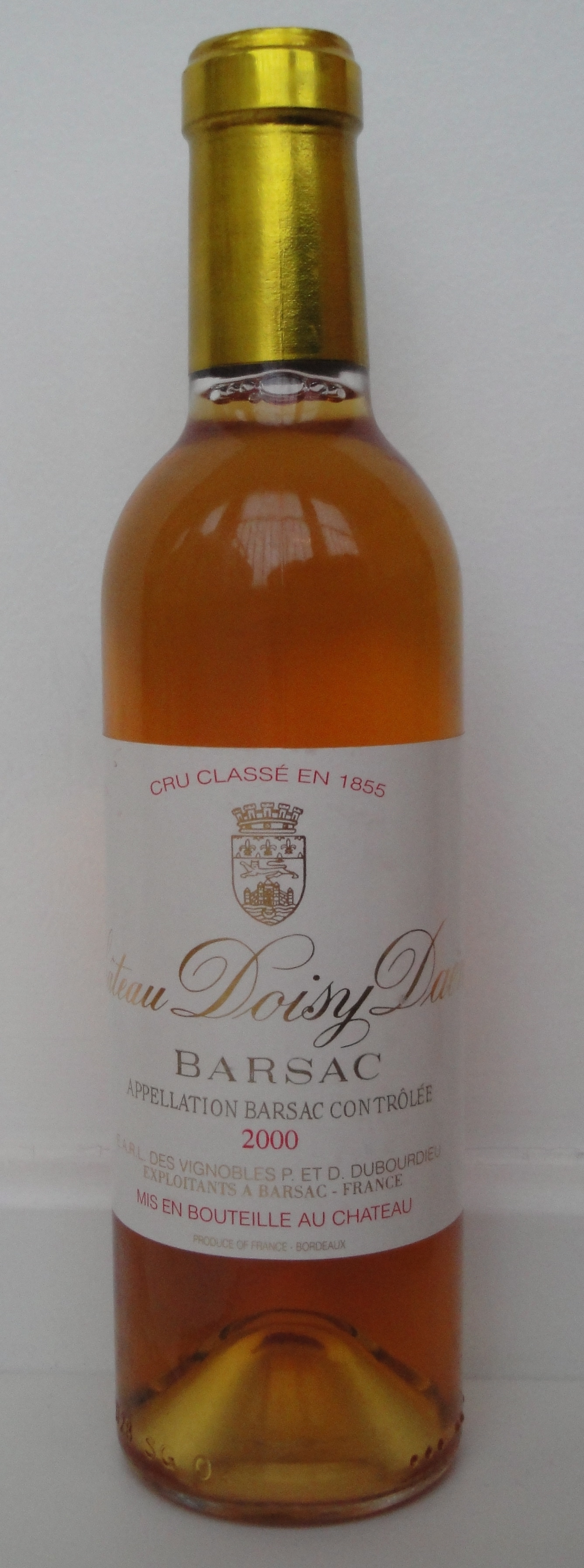
Château Doisy Daëne

The estates are listed in Les Grands Crus classés en 1855 with their commune (village), and their AOC in parentheses, if different from the commune. The 19th-century names appear as listed by the brokers on 18 April 1855, followed by the modern names, as the use of "second cru" for red wines and "deuxième cru" for white wines.

=== The red wines of the Gironde ===
==== First growths (premiers crus) ====
- Château Lafite, now Château Lafite Rothschild, Pauillac
- Château Latour, Pauillac
- Château Margaux, Margaux
- Haut-Brion,^{[a]} now Château Haut-Brion, Pessac, Graves
- Mouton,^{[b]} now Château Mouton Rothschild, Pauillac

==== Second growths (deuxièmes crus) ====
- Rauzan-Ségla, now Château Rauzan-Ségla, Margaux
- Rauzan-Gassies, now Château Rauzan-Gassies, Margaux
- Léoville, now
  - Château Léoville-Las Cases, St.-Julien
  - Château Léoville-Poyferré, St.-Julien
  - Château Léoville-Barton, St.-Julien
- Vivens Durfort, now Château Durfort-Vivens, Margaux
- Gruaud-Laroze, now Château Gruaud-Larose, St.-Julien
- Lascombes, now Château Lascombes, Margaux
- Brane, now Château Brane-Cantenac, Cantenac-Margaux (Margaux)
- Pichon Longueville, now
  - Château Pichon Longueville Baron, Pauillac (commonly known as Pichon Baron)
  - Château Pichon Longueville Comtesse de Lalande, Pauillac (commonly known as Pichon Lalande or Pichon Comtesse)
- Ducru Beau Caillou, now Château Ducru-Beaucaillou, St.-Julien
- Cos Destournel, now Château Cos d'Estournel, St.-Estèphe
- Montrose, now Château Montrose, St.-Estèphe

==== Third growths (troisièmes crus) ====
- Kirwan, now Château Kirwan, Cantenac-Margaux (Margaux)
- Château d'Issan, Cantenac-Margaux (Margaux)
- Lagrange, Château Lagrange, St.-Julien
- Langoa, now Château Langoa-Barton, St.-Julien
- Giscours, now Château Giscours, Labarde-Margaux (Margaux)
- St.-Exupéry, now Château Malescot St. Exupéry, Margaux
- Boyd, now
  - Château Cantenac-Brown, Cantenac-Margaux (Margaux)
  - Château Boyd-Cantenac, Margaux
- Palmer, now Château Palmer, Cantenac-Margaux (Margaux)
- Lalagune, now Château La Lagune, Ludon (Haut-Medoc)
- Desmirail, now Château Desmirail, Margaux
- Dubignon,^{[c]} later Château Dubignon, Margaux
- Calon, now Château Calon-Ségur, St.-Estèphe
- Ferrière, now Château Ferrière, Margaux
- Becker, now Château Marquis d'Alesme Becker, Margaux

==== Fourth growths (quatrièmes crus) ====
- St.-Pierre, now Château Saint-Pierre, St.-Julien
- Talbot, now Château Talbot, St.-Julien
- Du-Luc, now Château Branaire-Ducru, St.-Julien
- Duhart, now Château Duhart-Milon, Pauillac
- Pouget-Lassale and Pouget, both now Château Pouget, Cantenac-Margaux (Margaux)
- Carnet, now Château La Tour Carnet, St.-Laurent (Haut-Médoc)
- Rochet, now Château Lafon-Rochet, St.-Estèphe
- Château de Beychevele, now Château Beychevelle, St.-Julien
- Le Prieuré, now Château Prieuré-Lichine, Cantenac-Margaux (Margaux)
- Marquis de Thermes, now Château Marquis de Terme, Margaux

==== Fifth growths (cinquièmes crus) ====
- Canet, now Château Pontet-Canet, Pauillac
- Batailley, now
  - Château Batailley, Pauillac
  - Château Haut-Batailley, Pauillac
- Grand Puy, now Château Grand-Puy-Lacoste, Pauillac
- Artigues Arnaud, now Château Grand-Puy-Ducasse, Pauillac
- Lynch, now Château Lynch-Bages, Pauillac
- Lynch Moussas, now Château Lynch-Moussas, Pauillac
- Dauzac, now Château Dauzac, Labarde (Margaux)
- Darmailhac, now Château d'Armailhac, Pauillac
- Le Tertre, now Château du Tertre, Arsac (Margaux)
- Haut Bages, now Château Haut-Bages-Libéral, Pauillac
- Pédesclaux, now Château Pédesclaux, Pauillac
- Coutenceau, now Château Belgrave, St.-Laurent (Haut-Médoc)
- Camensac, now Château de Camensac, St.-Laurent (Haut-Médoc)
- Cos Labory, now Château Cos Labory, St.-Estèphe
- Clerc Milon, now Château Clerc-Milon, Pauillac
- Croizet-Bages, now Château Croizet Bages, Pauillac
- Cantemerle,^{[d]} now Château Cantemerle, Macau (Haut-Médoc)

=== The white wines of the Gironde ===
Barsac estates may be labelled with the appellation Barsac or Sauternes.

==== Superior first growth (premier cru supérieur) ====
- Yquem, now Château d'Yquem, Sauternes

==== First growths (premier crus) ====
- Latour Blanche, now Château La Tour Blanche, Bommes (Sauternes)
- Peyraguey, now
  - Château Lafaurie-Peyraguey, Bommes (Sauternes)
  - Château Clos Haut-Peyraguey, Bommes (Sauternes)
- Vigneau, now Château de Rayne-Vigneau, Bommes (Sauternes)
- Suduiraut, now Château Suduiraut, Preignac (Sauternes)
- Coutet, now Château Coutet, Barsac
- Climens, now Château Climens, Barsac
- Bayle, now Château Guiraud, Sauternes
- Rieusec, now Château Rieussec, Fargues (Sauternes)
- Rabeaud, now
  - Château Rabaud-Promis, Bommes (Sauternes)
  - Château Sigalas-Rabaud, Bommes (Sauternes)

==== Second growths (deuxième crus) ====
- Mìrat, now Château de Myrat, Barsac
- Doisy, now
  - Château Doisy Daëne, Barsac
  - Château Doisy-Dubroca, Barsac
  - Château Doisy-Védrines, Barsac
- Pexoto, now part of Château Rabaud-Promis
- D’arche, now Château d'Arche, Sauternes
- Filhot, now Château Filhot, Sauternes
- Broustet Nérac, now
  - Château Broustet, Barsac
  - Château Nairac, Barsac
- Caillou, now Château Caillou, Barsac
- Suau, now Château Suau, Barsac
- Malle, now Château de Malle, Preignac (Sauternes)
- Romer, now
  - Château Romer, Fargues (Sauternes)
  - Château Romer du Hayot, Fargues (Sauternes)
- Lamothe, now
  - Château Lamothe, Sauternes
  - Château Lamothe-Guignard, Sauternes

== See also ==
- Classification of Graves wine
- Classification of Saint-Émilion wine
- Regional wine classification
- History of Bordeaux wine
- Bordeaux wine regions
- Judgment of Paris

== Notes and references ==
a. The only classified estate situated in Graves rather than Médoc.
b. Listed as Second Growth in 1855, elevated to First Growth in 1973.
c. Dissolved in 1960.
d. Added in 1856.

General

- Stevenson, Tom (2005). The Sotheby's Wine Encyclopedia (4th ed.). London: Dorling Kindersley. pp. 64–65. ISBN 0-7566-1324-8.
- Echikson, Tom (2004). Noble rot. NY: Norton. ISBN 0-8168-6825-5
- Taber, George M. (2005). Judgment of Paris: California vs. France and the historic 1976 Tasting that Revolutionized Wine. NY: Scribner. ISBN 0-7432-9732-6

Footnotes
