= Château Filhot =

Coordinates: 44°31′22.83″N 0°20′30.71″W

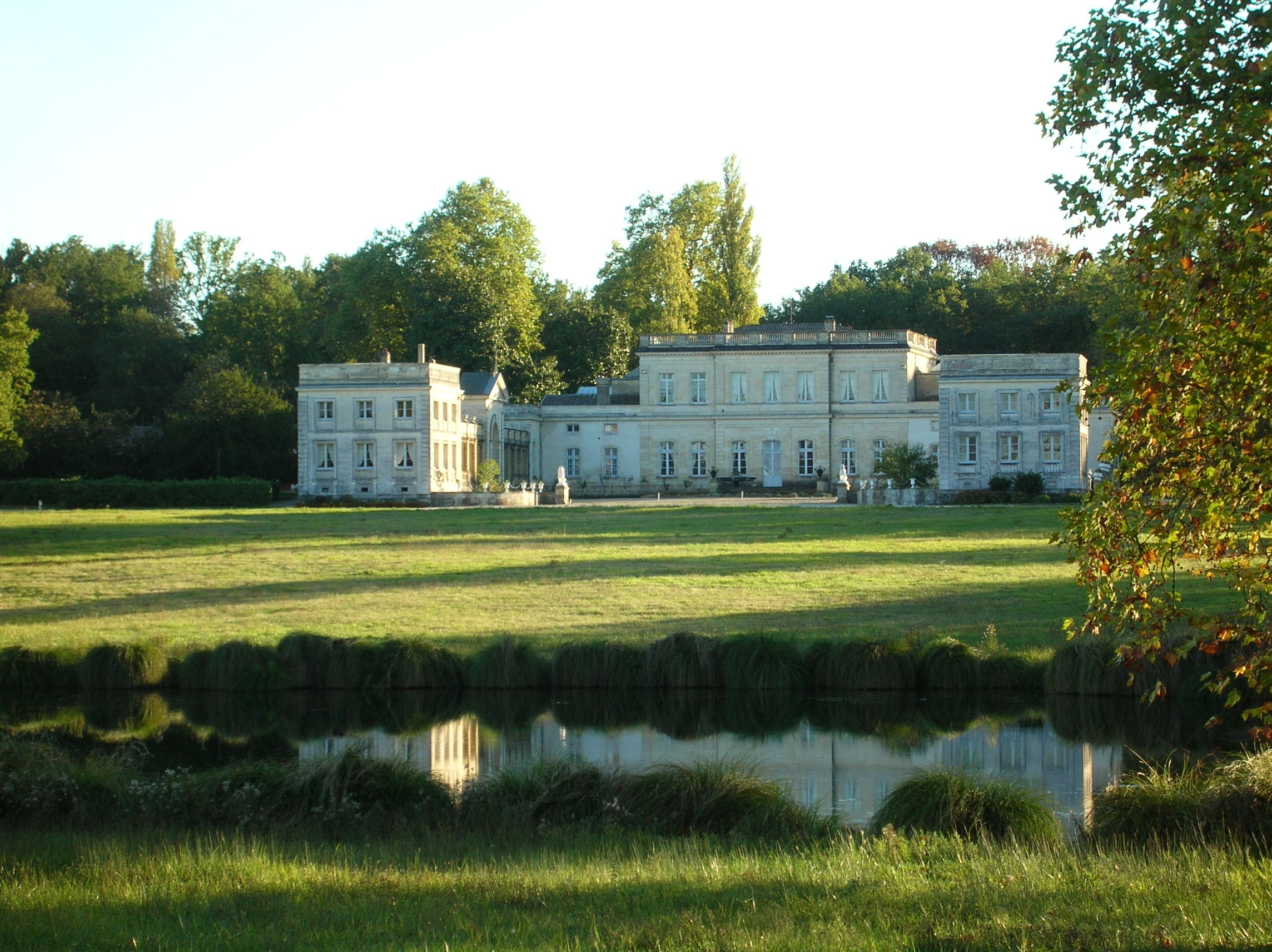
- Château Filhot
- Location: Sauternes
- Wine region: Sauternes, Gironde
- Appellation: Sauternes
- Area cultivated: 62 hectares (150 acres)
- Known for: Château Filhot (prestige)
- Varietals: Sémillon, Sauvignon blanc, Muscadelle
- Website: filhot.com

Château Filhot, archaically named Maison Noble de Verdoulet, is a winery rated Deuxième cru classé (French, “Second Growth”) in the Bordeaux Wine Official Classification of 1855, from the Sauternes appellation in Gironde. Considered by some unjustly omitted from the Premier cru classification, Filhot produces a drier wine than Château d'Yquem, with an unusually high alcohol content for a Sauternes.

== History ==
The vineyard dating from the 1630s, the château was founded by Romain de Filhot in 1709. Following the French Revolution, the estate was taken over by Romain-Bertrand de Lur-Saluces who added the estate of Pinaud du Rey and had the château redesigned to its English appearance in 1840. During the period when then American ambassador to France Thomas Jefferson ranked the wine directly behind Yquem, Filhot enjoyed a greater reputation than today, and the two wines were comparably priced.

In 1935, Comtesse Durieu de Lacarelle (the sister of the Marquis de Lur-Saluces, proprietor of Château d'Yquem) bought the estate, which was subsequently modernised by her son, Louis Durieu de Lacarelle, during the 1970s. The estate is currently run by the Vaucelles family.

== Production ==
The vineyard area extends 62 hectares (150 acres) from a 350 hectares estate with the grape varieties of 60% Sémillon, 36% Sauvignon blanc and 4% Muscadelle. Their annual production is an average of 6500 cases. The second wine is called Chateau Pineau du Rey.

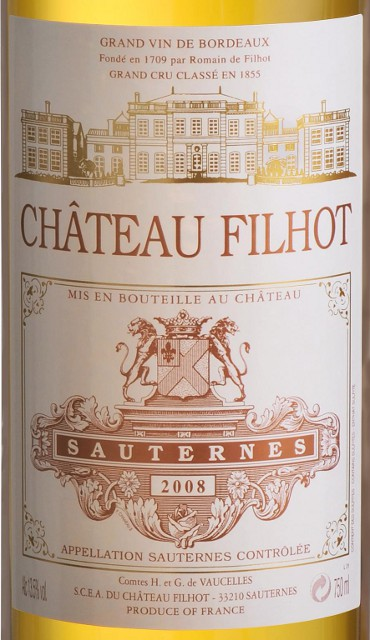
Detail of a Château Filhot 2008 label

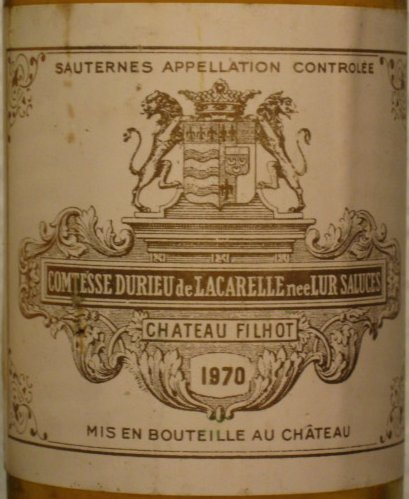
Detail of a Château Filhot 1970 label
