= Second growth =

Second growth may refer to:

- Secondary forest
- Deuxième cru, the second-highest classification under the Bordeaux Wine Official Classification of 1855
