= Château Broustet =

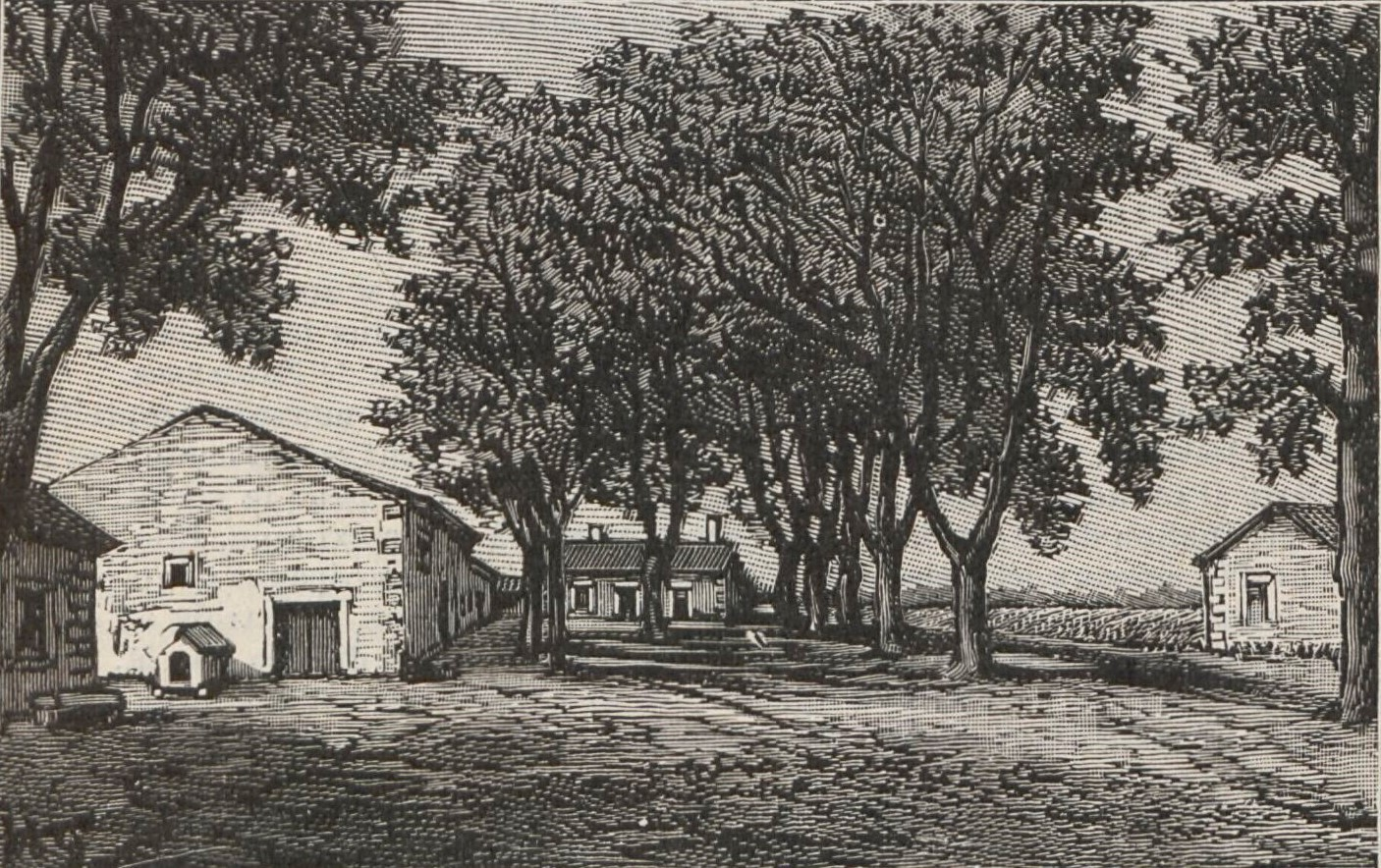
Illustration of Château Broustet from the book “Région de Sauternes et les vins blancs des cantons de Podensac et Langon” by Édouard Féret, published in 1908

Château Broustet is a sweet white wine ranked as Second Cru Classé (French, "Second Growth") in the original Bordeaux Wine Official Classification of 1855. Belonging to the Sauternes appellation in Gironde, in the region of Graves, the winery is located in the commune of Barsac.
