= Château de Myrat =

Coordinates: 44.59724°N 0.33442°W

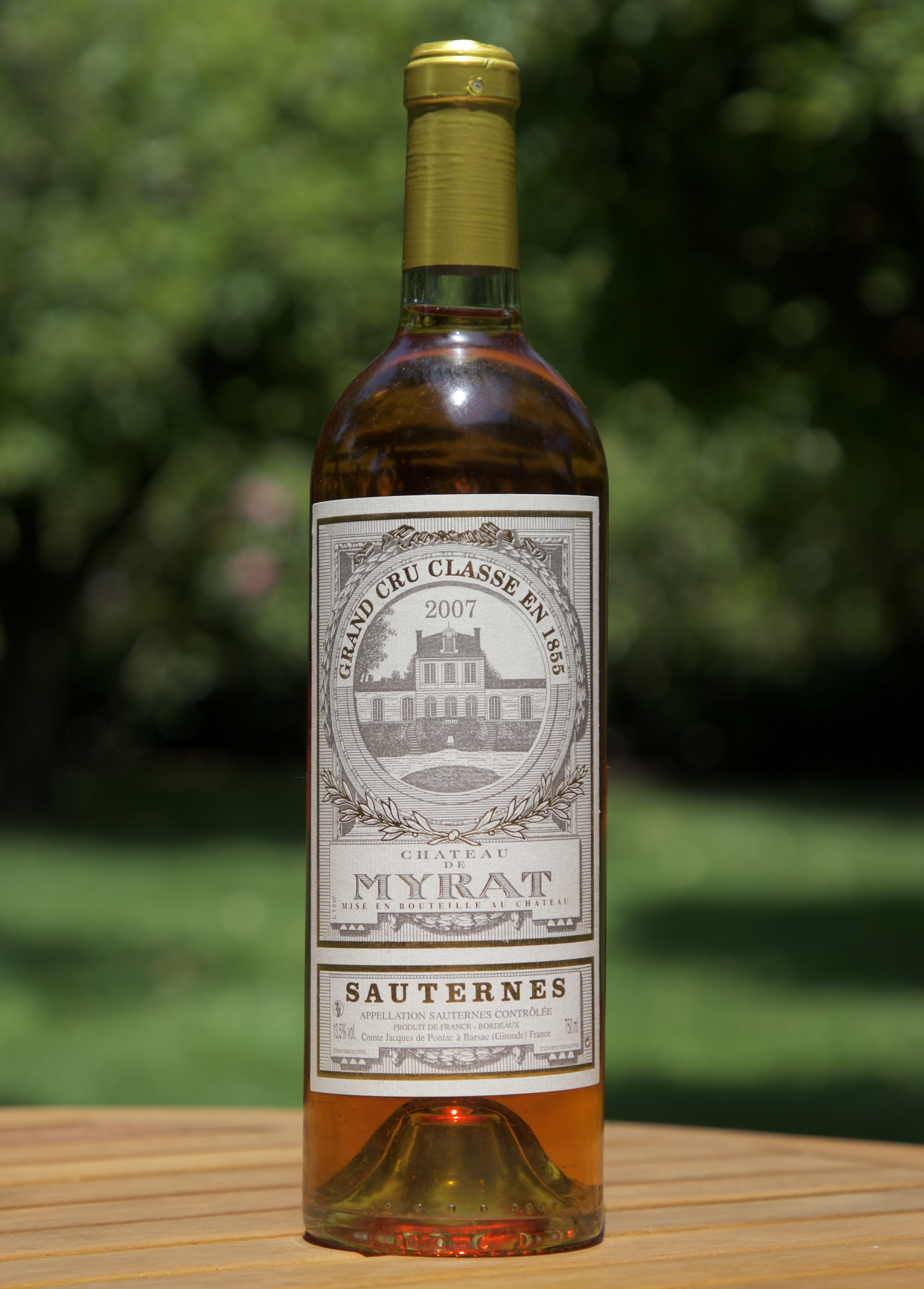
Bottle of Château de Myrat

Château de Myrat or simply Château Myrat, is a wine estate belonging to the Sauternes appellation in Gironde, in the region of Graves. The estate is located in the commune of Barsac and produces a sweet white wine (Sauternes) ranked as a Grand Cru of Second Growth (Deuxième Cru) class in the original Bordeaux Wine Official Classification of 1855.
