= Château d'Arche =

Coordinates: 44.53806°N 0.34344°W

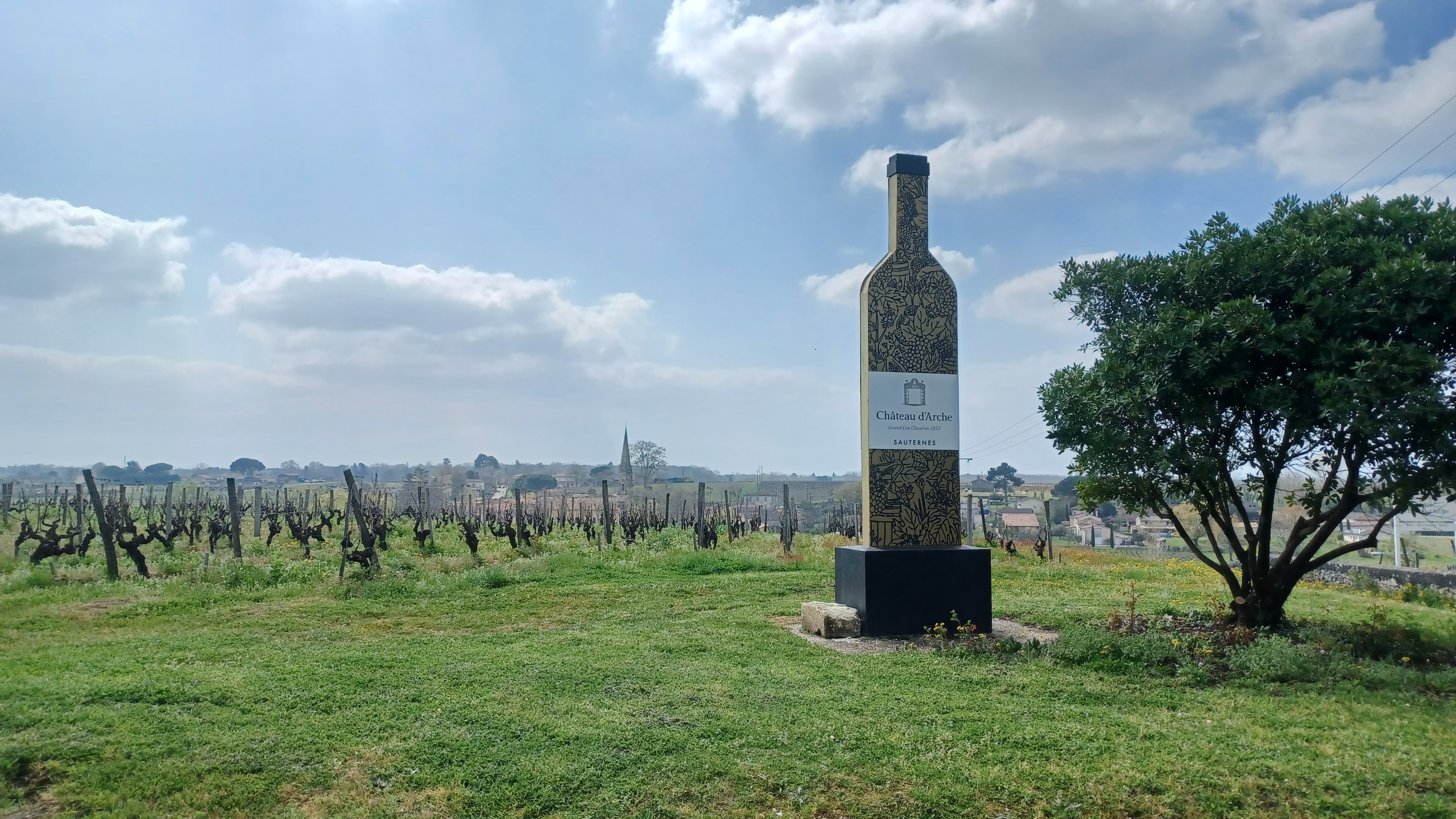
Square in front of the winery with a view of Sauternes

Château d'Arche (French pronunciation: [ʃato daʁʃ]) is a sweet white wine ranked as Second Cru Classé (French, “Second Growth”) in the original Bordeaux Wine Official Classification of 1855. Belonging to the Sauternes appellation in Gironde, in the region of Graves, the winery is located in the commune of Sauternes.

== History ==
One of three estates within the Sauternes commune that was rated second growth in the Classification of 1855, situated on a favourable ridge location, Château d'Arche is named for the Comte d'Arche, owner of the estate from 1733 to 1789. Under Comte d'Arche the estate held a high reputation, and its placement in the 1855 classification's second tier is considered due to the divisions of the estate that followed the French Revolution, and the subsequent drop in quality from the level of the 1780s.

In 1981 the property was leased by INAO president Pierre Perromat, who sought to make improvements to the standard of production. With the arrival of Perromat, production of the formerly widely known second wine d'Arche-Lafaurie ceased, bearing the name of former share-owner Lafaurie of Château Lafaurie-Peyraguey.

In 2009, d'Arche began a campaign of bottling wine in a 100ml test-tube shaped bottle, in an effort to target young drinkers in nightclubs.

== Production ==
The vineyards measure 40 hectares (99 acres), with a grape variety distribution of 90% Sémillon, 10% Sauvignon blanc.

The estate produces the second wine, Prieuré d'Arche, a choice reserve wine, Chateau d'Arche Lafaurie, as well as dry white and red bottlings, A d'Arche Bordeaux blanc sec and A d'Arche Graves rouge.
