= Château de Malle =

French sweet white wine

Coordinates: 44°33′54″N 0°17′48″W

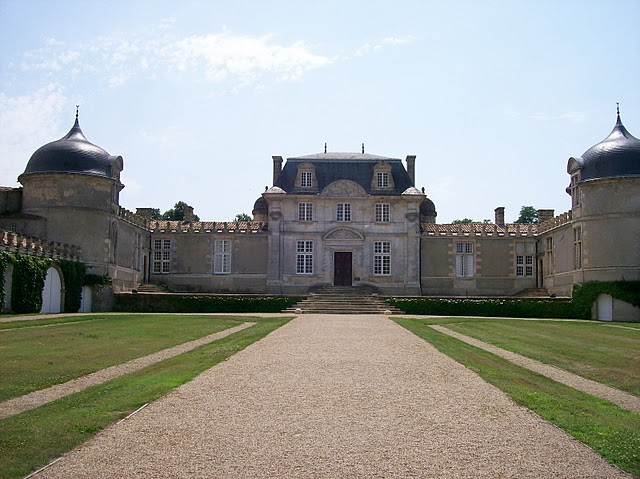
Château de Malle

Château de Malle is a sweet white wine ranked as Second Cru Classé (French, "Second Growth") in the original Bordeaux Wine Official Classification of 1855. Belonging to the Sauternes appellation in Gironde, in the region of Graves, the winery is located in the commune of Sauternes. The gardens of the chateau are classified among the Notable Gardens of France by the Committee of Parks and Gardens of the French Ministry of Culture.

== History ==
The estate has, over the centuries, known numerous trials and tribulations. Both good and bad fortune. The Château was not inhabited regularly for practically two generations. In the early fifties Pierre de Bournazel took over the property inherited from his uncle and godfather, Pierre de Lur-Saluces. He was a man possessed by a love of the land and of stone and he decided to re-instil life into the buildings and vineyards which undeniably were in a state of considerable neglect. He rebuilt the fermentation cellar, studied estate management, followed a course in oenology and together, with the help of his wife, made it a point of honour to re-establish the initial shape and form of the rooms of the Château whilst retaining their original appearance.

In 1956 he replanted the entire vineyard which had been destroyed by frost. Pierre de Bournazel became, as time went by, a major figure in the viticultural world of Bordeaux. He became the president of the Classified Growth Association of Sauternes and Barsac and in 1959 created the “Commanderie du Bontemps de Sauternes et Barsac”. Since the death in 1985 of her husband the Countess de Bournazel has taken great pains to continue the magnificent task which he commenced. Whilst continuing with the work of renovating to its previous splendour both the Château and the gardens, she has also managed to surround herself with an efficient team, responsible for continuing the task of enhancing the quality and value of the vineyard. She is today seconded by her sons. Château de Malle produces three excellent and prestigious wines - Château de Malle, Sauternes, “Grand Cru Classé” Great Classified Growth in 1855, Château de Cardaillan, a red Graves, and the M. de Malle a dry white Graves.

In April 2024, it was announced Château de Malle had been acquired by Bordeaux entrepreneurs, Luc and Clémence Planty.

== Gardens ==
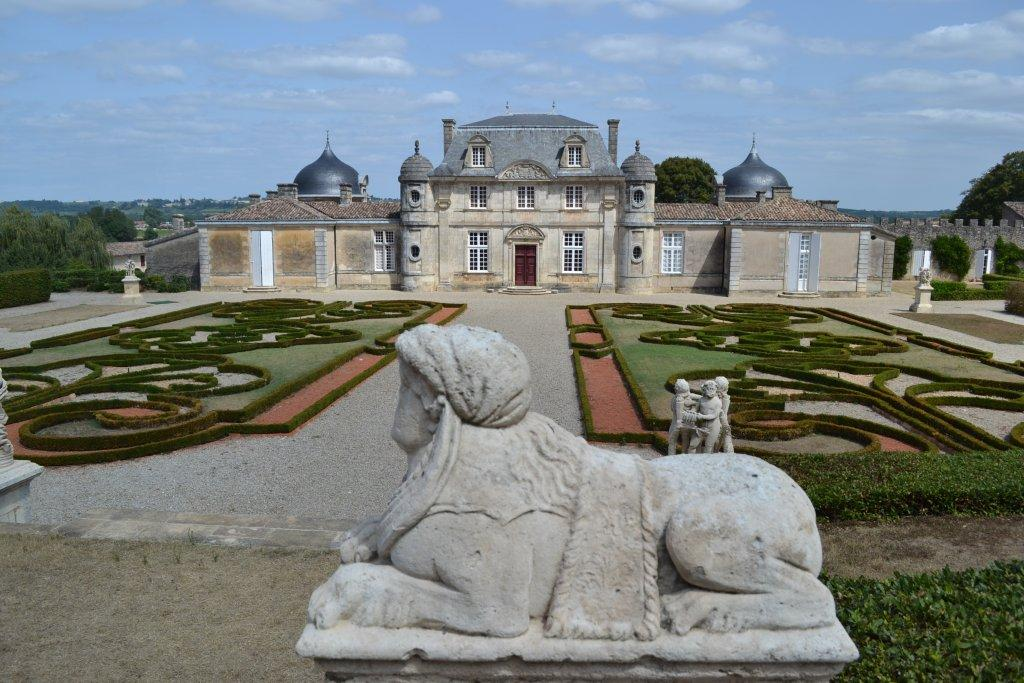
Gardens

The gardens of the château were created between 1717 and 1724 by Alexandre Eutrope de Lur Saluces. They were inspired by the gardens that he saw in Florence during his grand tour of Italy and his time spent at the court in Versailles. The park has a wide central axis and two terraces, with groups of statues and vases. The statues were done by Italian artists brought there for that purpose in the early part of the 18th century, and represent figures from Greek mythology: Cephalus, Aurora, Cupid, Aphrodite (Venus), Adonis, and Flora, the goddess of flowers and gardens. Other statues represent wine-making, the joys of the hunt and fishing, wine and intoxication. To the east of the first terrace is a small theater, decorated with figures from the Italian commedia dell'arte: Pantalone, Scaramouche and Harlequin. A stairway leads to a second terrace, where there are statues symbolizing of earth, wind, air and fire.

== Production ==
Château de Malle owns a total of 50 hectares (120 acres) vineyards in the communes of Preignac, Toulenne and Fargues. Of these, 28 hectares (69 acres) are in the Sauternes appellation, 3 hectares (7.4 acres) are dedicated to the production Graves Blanc and 20 hectares (49 acres) to Graves Rouge.

In the Sauternes appellation, production consists of the classified growth Château de Malle, as well as the unclassified Château de St Hélène. The composition of Château de Malle is 70% Sémillon, 28% Sauvignon blanc and 2% Muscadelle, and one-third new oak is used for the barrels.

A dry white wine called M de Malle is produced in the Graves appellation. It is composed of 70% Sauvignon blanc and 30% Sémillon, and is aged 6–9 months in oak, of which 30% new oak.

Red Graves wine is produced under the names Château de Cardaillan (50% Cabernet Sauvignon and 50% Merlot) and Château Pessan (60% Merlot and 40% Cabernet Sauvignon).
