= Château Croizet Bages =

Winery in the Bordeaux region of France

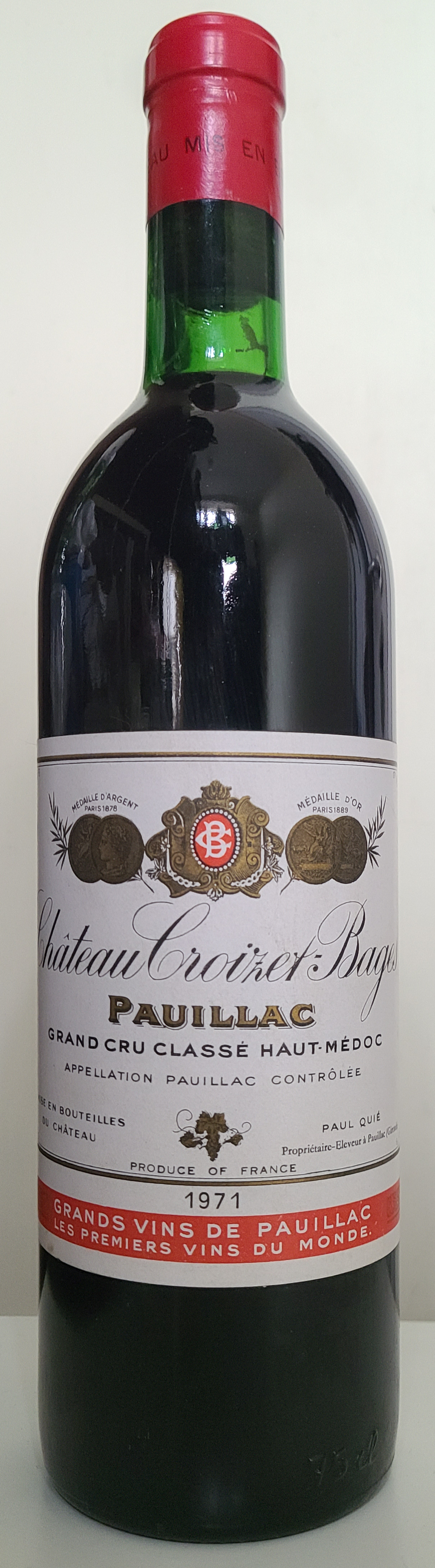
Grand Vin 1971 in excellent condition as seen in 2024

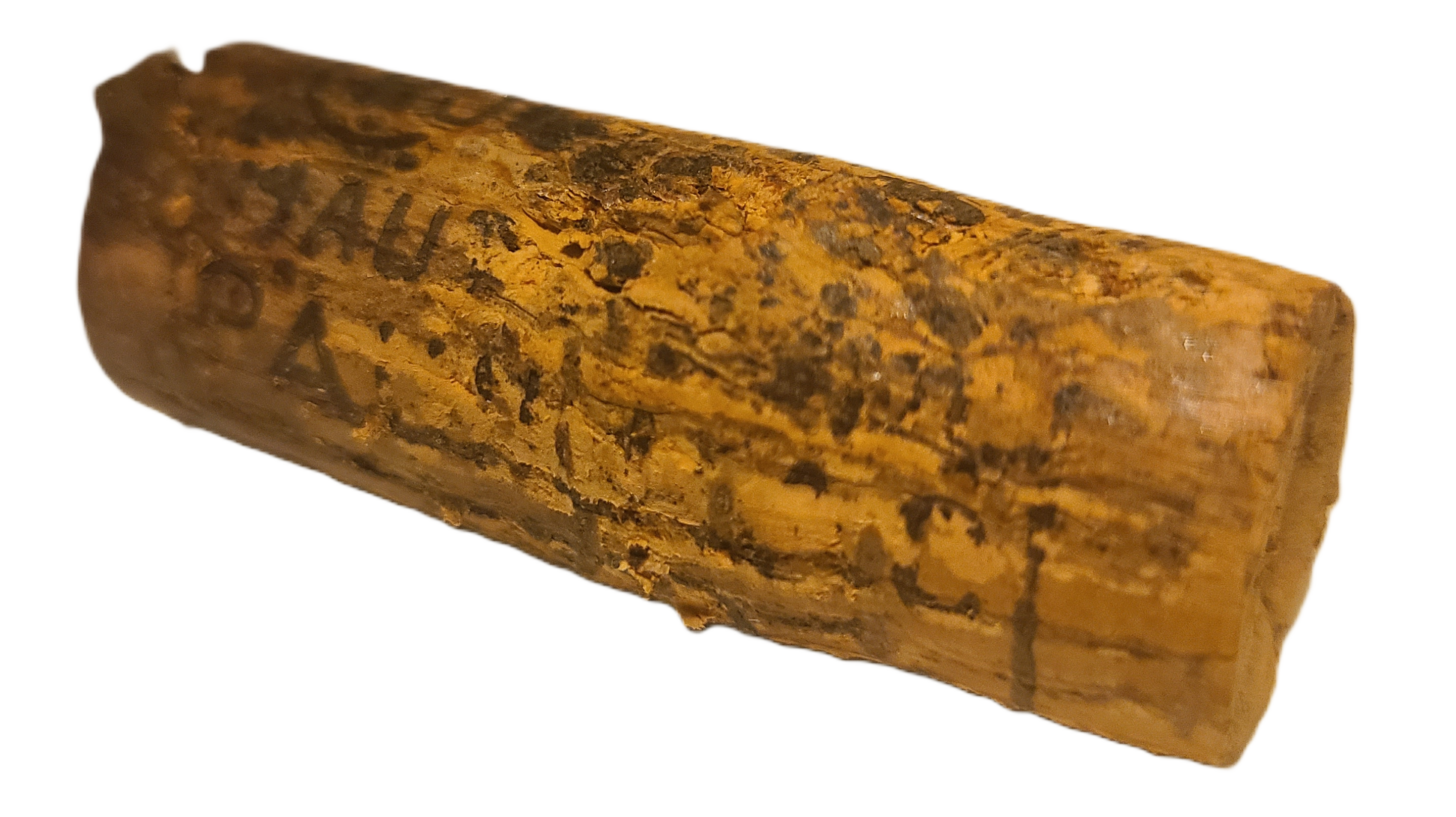
Cork of 1971 Grand Vin

Château Croizet Bages is a winery in the Pauillac appellation of the Bordeaux region of France. The wine produced here was classified as one of eighteen Cinquièmes Crus (Fifth Growths) in the Bordeaux Wine Official Classification of 1855.

One former owner of Croizet-Bages was the American Jean-Baptiste Monnot, son of Jean Ferreol Monnot, creator of the Klaxon horn (as well as being a successful miner of gold, silver and copper). Owners Anne Francoise Quié and Jean Philippe Quié, who took over from their father Jean-Michel at the estate in 2001, are twins. The family has three Médoc estates that are all 30 hectares.

The original chateau building for Croizet-Bages was built in 1875 along the quays of Pauillac, away from the vines (as is true for Grand-Puy-Ducasse and Duhart-Milon) but it was sold to the town, leaving this estate without the focal point of a grand building. The former chateau is now the Maison de la Culture de Pauillac. Current works are being done to upgrade the buildings in Bages, as the family counts an architect among its members.
