= Château Climens =

Castle in France

Coordinates: 44.58948°N 0.33473°W

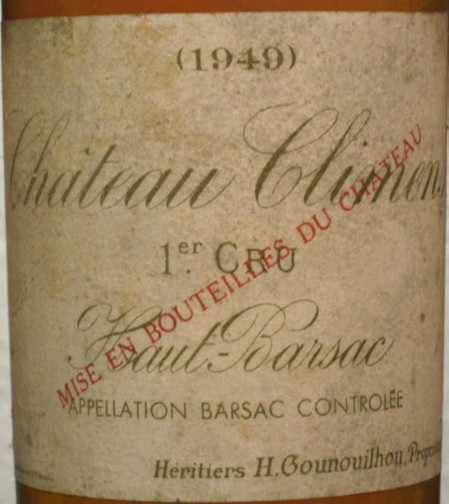
Detail of a Château Climens 1949 label

Château Climens is a Premier Cru Classé (French, "First Growth") Sauternes wine producer from the Barsac appellation. The estate is located in the southern part of France's Bordeaux wine region in the district of Graves, an eighth of a mile away from Barsac's other most historically rated vineyard, Château Coutet. Climens farms biodynamically and uses only natural yeast.

It is a wine characteristically known as better when young, though in its greatest years at the height of finesse. The vintages 1929, 1947 and 1949 were described by Alexis Lichine to surpass Château d'Yquem as "lighter, with less vinosity and body, yet miraculously subtle."

Château Climens also produces a second wine named Cypres de Climens.

As of 2018 Chateau Climens are producing a Semillon Sec:

Asphodele du Climens Grand Vin Blanc Sec.

== History ==
The name Climens, appeared for the first time on a contract dated 1547, the name in the local dialect meaning "unfertile, poor land". The Roborel family were responsible for expanding the estate, initiating viticulture in the 17th century, and oversaw the production of both white and red wine. In 1855, Monsieur Henri Gounouilhou bought the property, in the year Climens was classified a Premier Cru. It remained the property of the Gounouilhou family until Lucien Lurton of Château Brane-Cantenac bought the estate in 1971, along with Château Doisy-Dubroca. It has been run by his daughter, Bérénice Lurton, since 1992.

== Production ==
The grape variety is 100% Sémillon, which is said to suit the vineyard's chalky soil. The vineyard area extends 29 hectares or 70 acres, with an average production of 3,000 cases per year.
