= Château Talbot =

French winery of the Bordeaux region

Coordinates: 45.15930°N 0.75570°W

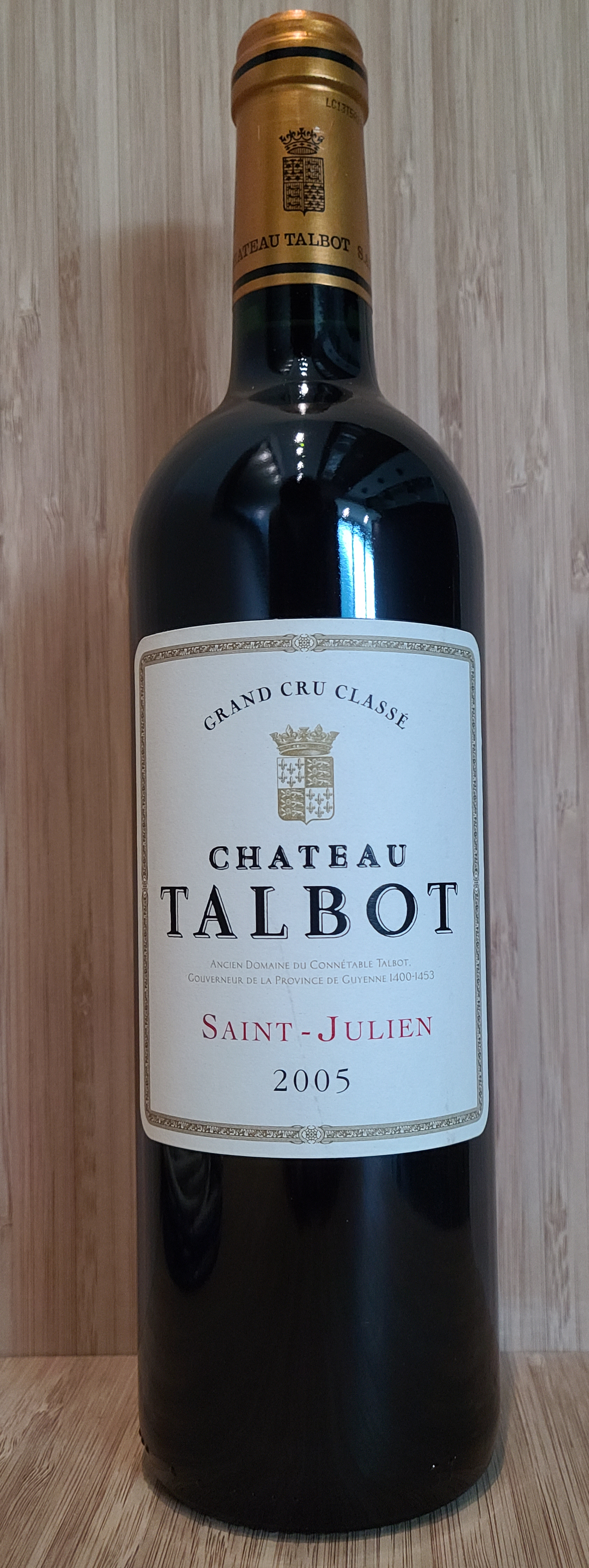
Grand Vin of 2005 vintage

Château Talbot is a winery in the Saint-Julien appellation of the Bordeaux region of France. Château Talbot is also the name of the red wine produced by this property. It was classified as one of ten Quatrièmes Crus Classés (Fourth Growths) in the Bordeaux Wine Official Classification of 1855. The estate is also notable for producing Caillou Blanc, the only white wine made within the Saint-Julien appellation.

== History ==
The Château used to be the property of Sir John Talbot, Governor of Aquitaine, Earl of Shrewsbury, in the 15th century. The property belonged to the Marquis of Aux for several decades, receiving its first Cocks & Féret lists in 1846 and 1855 and fourth growth classification in 1855, was then bought by Monsieur A. Claverie in 1899, before being acquired by Désiré Cordier in 1918.

His son Georges, then his grandson Jean inherited the property. Georges Cordier was among the first to replant white grape varieties in the Médoc during the 1930s, establishing what would become Caillou Blanc. Following Jean Cordier's death in 1993, his daughters Lorraine Rustmann and Nancy Bignon-Cordier took over as the fourth generation of the Cordier family. Today, Nancy Bignon-Cordier leads the estate alongside her husband Jean-Paul and their children. The estate is managed by general manager Jean-Michel Laporte (since 2018) and winemaker Jean-Max Drouilhet, who has overseen wine production since 2007, and Damien Hostein since 2016.

== Vineyard and production ==
The vineyard area of Château Talbot extends 111 hectares (270 acres), located a short distance from the Gironde estuary, making it one of the largest single-block vineyard estates in Bordeaux and in the Médoc. The vineyard reaches an elevation of 23 metres above sea level — the highest point in the Saint-Julien appellation — and borders the vineyards of Léoville Las Cases, Léoville Barton, and Léoville Poyferré. The vineyard is planted on fine gravelly rises, which are well drained.

The distribution of red wine grape varieties is 68% Cabernet Sauvignon, 28% Merlot and 4% Petit Verdot. The average age of the vines is 42 years with a 45 hl/ha yield. All the grapes are harvested by hand by a team of up to 180 pickers.

There are also cultivated white grape varieties on 4 ha (9.9 acres), planted to 80% Sauvignon blanc and 20% Sémillon. Grapes may be fermented either in wood or stainless steel tanks.

== Wines ==
Château Talbot produces three wines:

- Château Talbot (Grand Vin): the estate's flagship red wine, aged 15 months in French oak barrels (60% new oak). Based on Cabernet Sauvignon, Merlot, and Petit Verdot, it is noted for its consistency, longevity, and silky tannins. Critics have described it as embodying "the ideal of Saint-Julien".
- Connétable Talbot (Second wine): introduced with the 1979 vintage, aged 12 months in oak barrel. It offers earlier accessibility while sharing the same terroir as the Grand Vin.
- Caillou Blanc de Château Talbot: the only white wine produced within the Saint-Julien appellation, and one of the oldest dry white wines of the Médoc. First produced in the 1930s after Georges Cordier planted white varieties on the estate, it is made from Sauvignon Blanc and Sémillon, barrel-aged on lees with Burgundian-style stirring (bâtonnage). The wine is noted for its exotic fruit aromatics and textured palate.

== Critical reception ==
Château Talbot has received consistent recognition from major wine critics. The 2020 vintage was rated 95 points by Antonio Galloni of Vinous, who described it as "every bit as impressive" and "the best in recent memory". The 2019 vintage received 93 points from Wine Advocate and the 2016 vintage is widely considered one of the estate's finest in recent decades. Bettane & Desseauve have written that Talbot "embodies for many the ideal of Saint-Julien, generously bouqueted, very stable and sure to age."

Since the 2019 vintage, each bottle carries an individual authentication system using the MSP-SAS QRSH process to guarantee traceability and combat counterfeiting.

== See also ==
- John Talbot, 1st Earl of Shrewsbury
- Saint-Julien-Beychevelle
- Bordeaux Wine Official Classification of 1855
