= Château Malescot St. Exupéry =

French winery

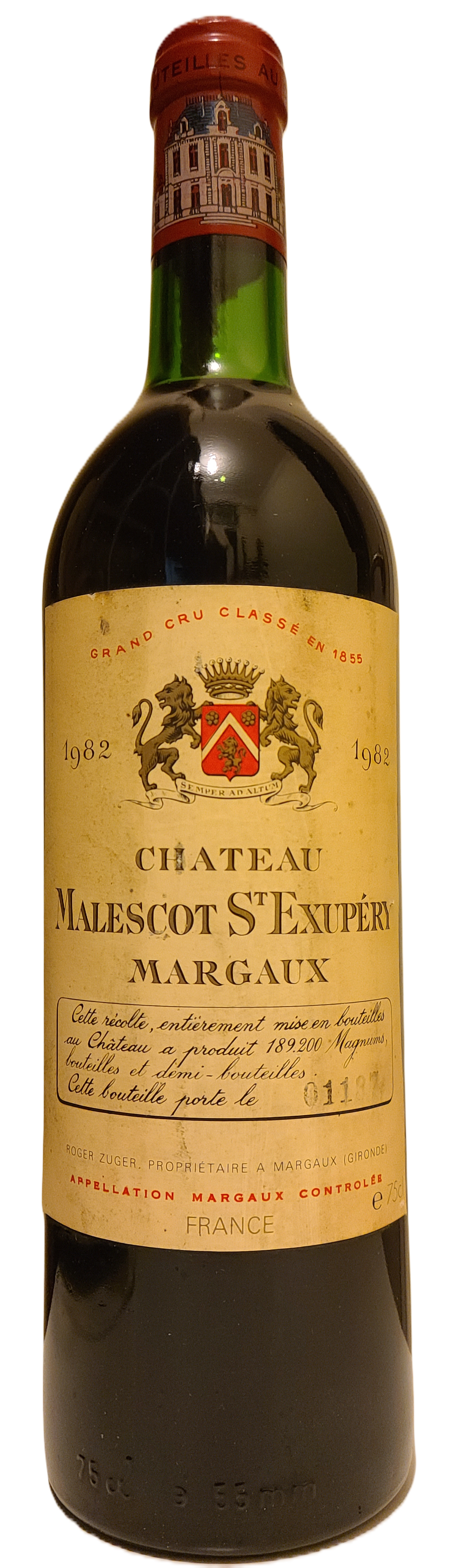
Grand Vin 1982

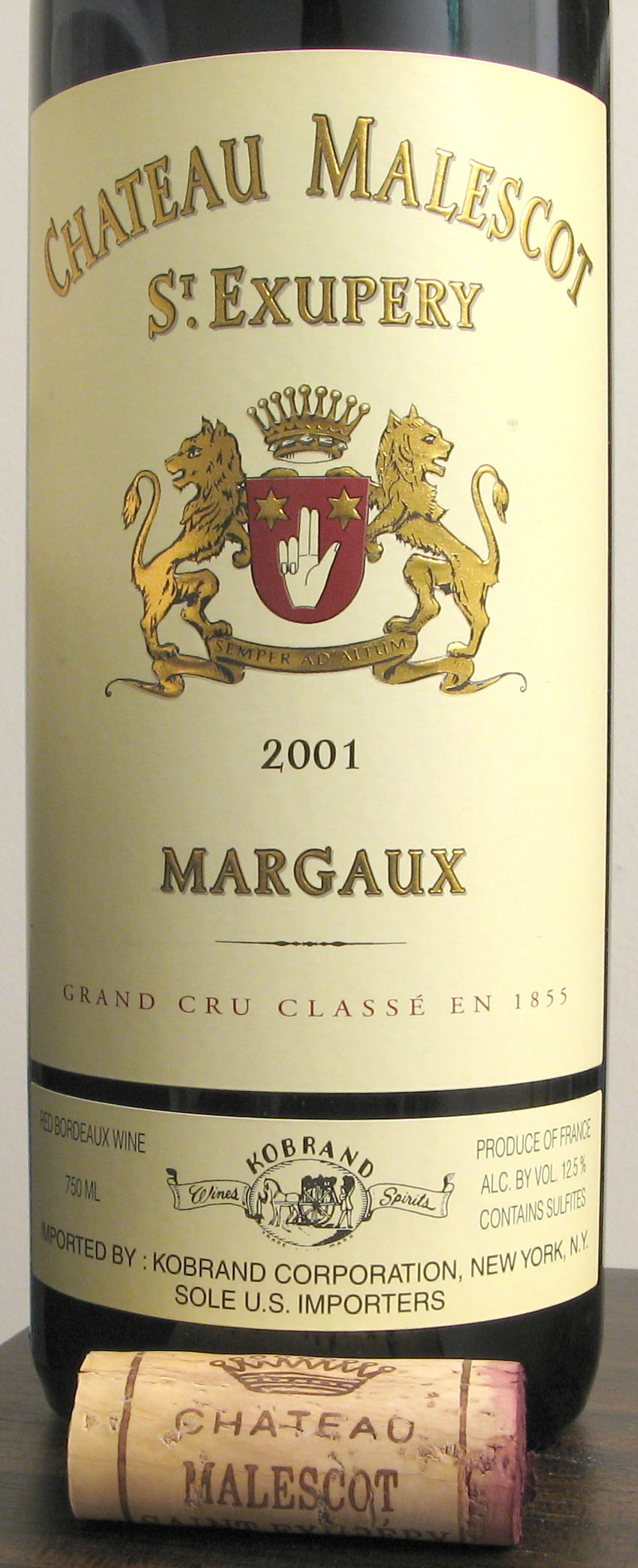

Château Malescot St. Exupéry is a winery in the Margaux appellation of the Bordeaux region of France. The wine produced here was classified as one of fourteen Troisièmes Crus (Third Growths) in the historic Bordeaux Wine Official Classification of 1855. The vineyards are planted with 50% Cabernet Sauvignon, 35% Merlot, 10% Cabernet Franc and 5% Petit Verdot, at a density of 10,000 vines/hectare, with an average age of about 35 years. A second wine is also produced, La Dame de Malescot.
