= Capian =

- Commune
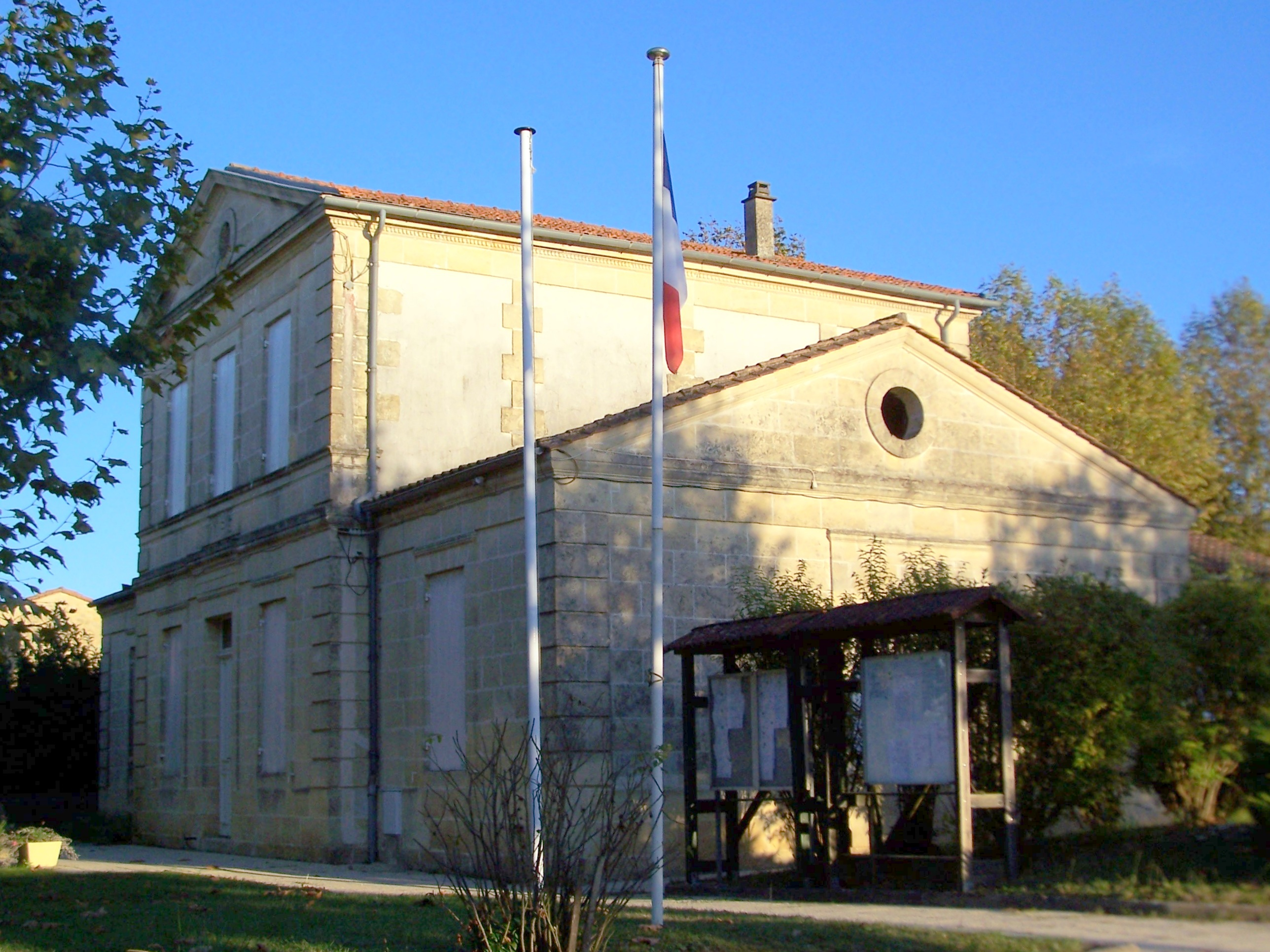
- The town hall in Capian

- Coat of arms
- Location of Capian
- Location within France Location within Nouvelle-Aquitaine
- Coordinates: 44°42′42″N 0°19′47″W
- Country: France
- Region: Nouvelle-Aquitaine
- Department: Gironde
- Arrondissement: Langon
- Canton: L'Entre-Deux-Mers

Government
  - Mayor (2020–2026): Frédéric Lataste
- Area^{1}: 18.23 km^{2} (7.04 sq mi)
- Elevation: 110 m (360 ft)
- Highest elevation: 115 m (377 ft)
- Lowest elevation: 17 m (56 ft)
- Population (2023): 809
  - Density: 44.4/km^{2} (115/sq mi)
- Time zone: UTC+01:00 (CET)
  - Summer (DST): UTC+02:00 (CEST)
- INSEE/Postal code: 33093 /33550
- ^{1} French Land Register data, which excludes lakes, ponds, glaciers > 1 km^{2} (0.386 sq mi or 247 acres) and river estuaries.

Capian (French pronunciation: [kapjɑ̃]) is a commune in the Gironde department in Nouvelle-Aquitaine in southwestern France.

It is located southwest of Bordeaux on the Garonne river. The commune is in the middle of the Bordeaux wine appellation AOC Premieres Cotes de Bordeaux. Many of the villagers own or work in wineries.

== Population ==
Historical population
Year	Pop.	±% p.a.
1968	623	—
1975	591	−0.75%
1982	669	+1.79%
1990	602	−1.31%
1999	624	+0.40%
2007	627	+0.06%
2012	690	+1.93%
2017	721	+0.88%
2023	809	+1.94%
Source: INSEE

== Vineyard ==
Château Suau (Capian)

== See also ==
- Communes of the Gironde department
