= Château d'Yquem =

Wine from Sauternes, France

- Château d'Yquem logo
- Coordinates: 44.5447°N 0.3287°W
- Wine region: Sauternes, Gironde
- Appellation: Sauternes
- Area cultivated: 126 hectares (310 acres)
- Known for: Château d'Yquem (prestige); Ygrec (dry white, since 1959)
- Varietals: Sémillon, Sauvignon blanc
- Website: yquem.fr

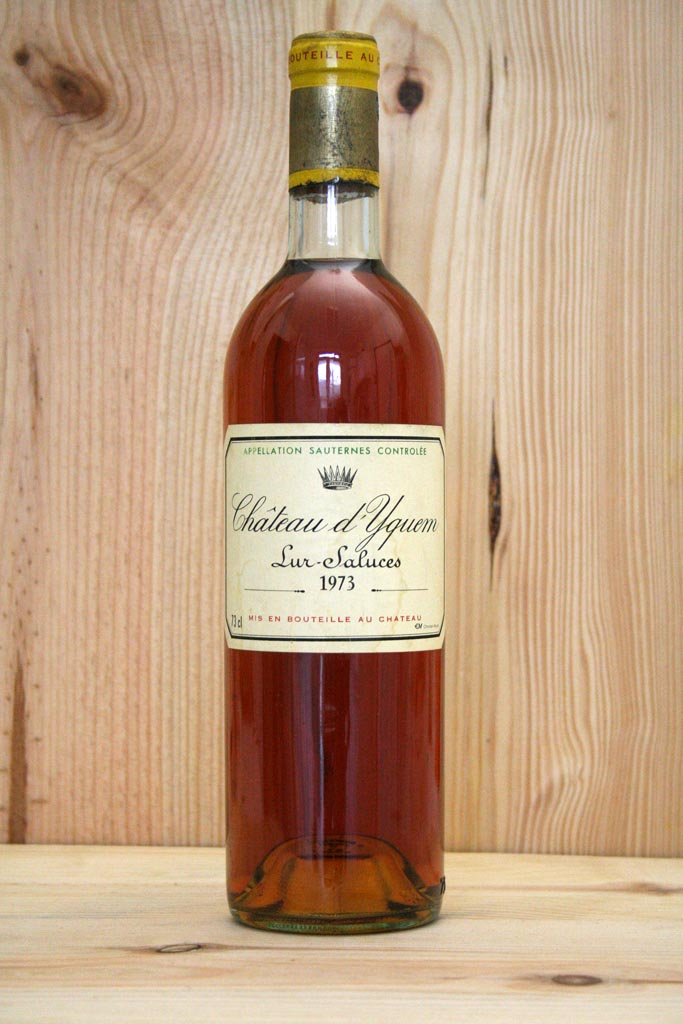
A bottle of Yquem of 1973

Château d'Yquem (French: [ʃɑto dikɛm]) is a Premier Cru Supérieur (Fr: "Superior First Growth") wine from the Sauternes, Gironde, region in the southern part of the Bordeaux vineyards known as Graves. In the Bordeaux Wine Official Classification of 1855, Château d'Yquem was the only Sauternes given this rating, indicating its perceived superiority and higher prices over all other wines of its type. Yquem's success stems largely from the site's susceptibility to attack by "noble rot" (a particular kind of infestation by Botrytis cinerea).

Wines from Château d'Yquem are characterised by their complexity, concentration and sweetness, which is balanced by relatively high acidity. With proper care, a bottle will keep for a century or more, and the fruity overtones will gradually fade and integrate with more complex secondary and tertiary flavours.

Since 1959, Château d'Yquem has also produced a dry white wine called Ygrec (the name of the letter "Y" in French), made predominantly from Sauvignon blanc and a few lots of Sémillon. It was originally produced only in select years; since 2004 it has been produced every year.

== History ==
Chateau d'Yquem was acquired by Jacques de Sauvage in December 1593. De Sauvage acquired the property from the French monarchy by exchanging other lands that he owned for what was then referred to as the 'House of Yquem'. The site has been home to a vineyard since at least 1711 when the estate became fully owned by Léon de Sauvage d'Yquem. In 1785 it passed to the Lur-Saluces family when Françoise-Joséphine de Sauvage d'Yquem married Count Louis-Amédée de Lur-Saluces, a godson of Louis XV and Victoire de France. Monsieur Lur-Saluces died three years later, and his wife subsequently focused her energy on sustaining and improving the estate.

While Minister Plenipotentiary to France, Thomas Jefferson visited the château and later wrote, "Sauterne.^{[sic]} This is the best white wine of France and the best of it is made by Monsieur de Lur-Saluces." Jefferson ordered 250 bottles of the 1784 vintage for himself, and additional bottles for George Washington. However, at that time the technique of allowing noble rot to infect grapes had not yet been discovered, so the wine Jefferson was drinking was a different and less sweet wine.

The 1811 Château d'Yquem, a comet vintage, has exhibited what wine experts like Robert Parker have described as exceptional longevity with Parker scoring the wine a perfect 100 points when tasted in 1996.

=== Since 1968 ===
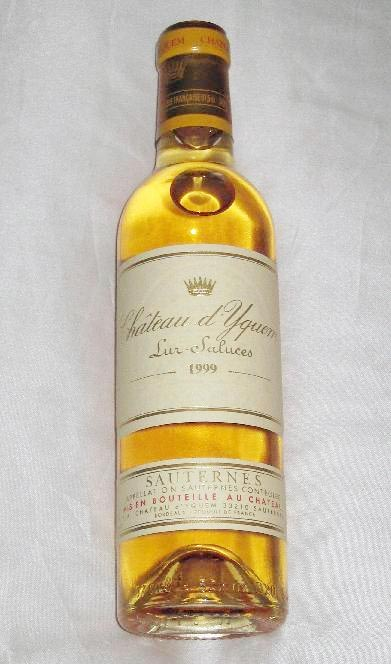
A half bottle of Yquem, 1999.

After the 1968 death of the Marquis Bernard de Lur-Saluces, the château was run by Comte Alexandre de Lur-Saluces, a minority (7%) owner. The Comte inherited a typical annual production of 66,000 bottles a year. After the 1973 oil crisis, demand fell and prices plummeted. The price of a bottle of d'Yquem dropped to 35 francs; prices began to rise only in the 1980s.

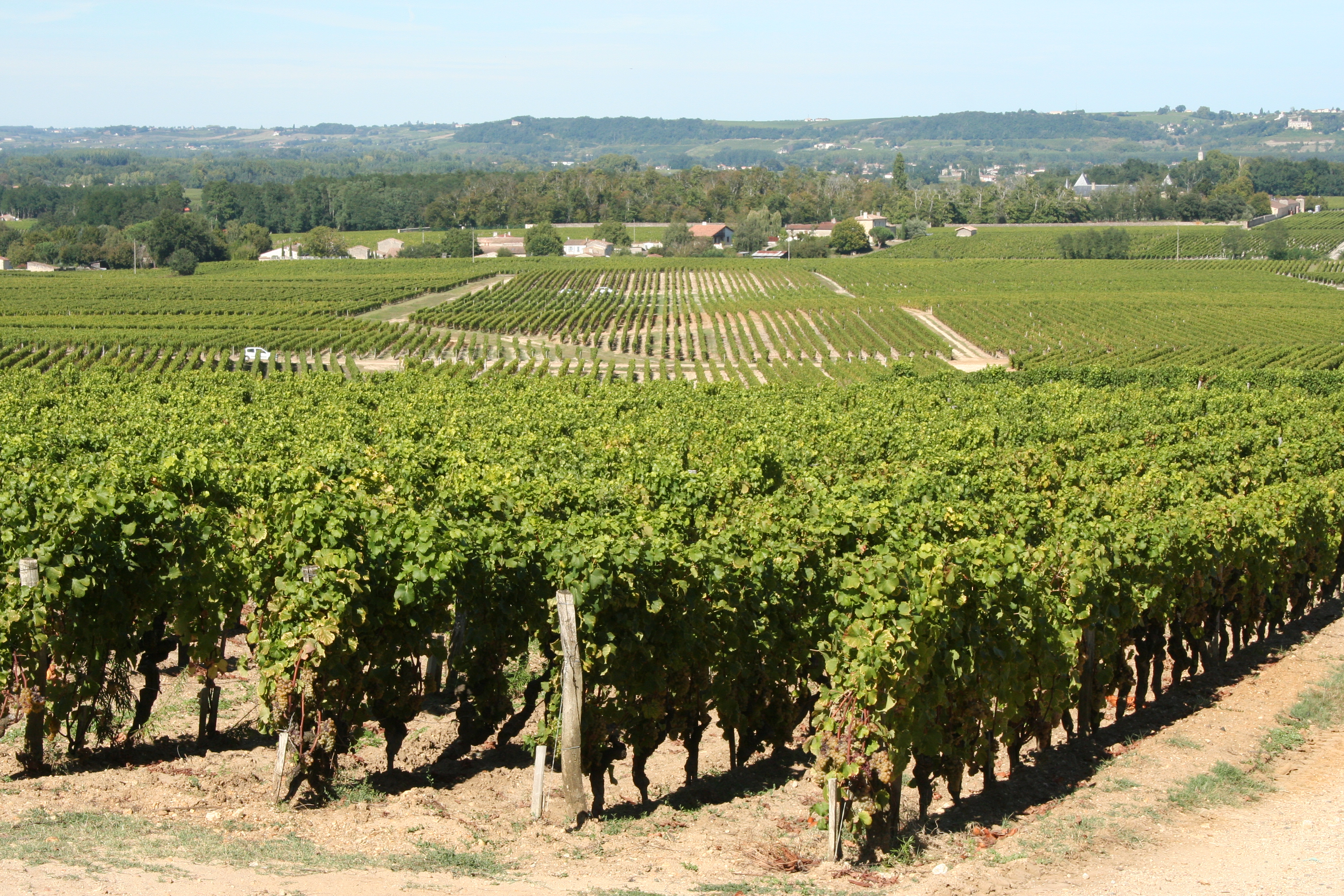
Vineyards of Château d’Yquem in Sauternes.

Under the Comte's leadership, "tractors replaced horses, collapsing cellars were renovated, and unused acreage was planted", with production in good years reaching 100,000 bottles and sales about $10 million.

Following a bitter family feud and the decision of Eugene de Lur-Saluces (Alexandre's other brother) to sell part of his 47% share of the business. On 28 November 1996, the French luxury goods giant LVMH Moët Hennessy – Louis Vuitton announced that it would be buying 55% of Château d'Yquem from the family of the Comte Alexandre de Lur-Saluces for about $100 million. The Comte challenged the sale in court for over two years,. In December 1998,the Bordeaux Court of Appeals confirmed previous decisions permitting LVMH to acquire 38 percent of the Sauternes estate.

On 17 May 2004, the Comte retired and was replaced by the current managing director of Château Cheval Blanc, Pierre Lurton. The Comte had been known for being particularly dedicated towards maintaining quality, going so far as to reject an entire batch of the wine if he did not like the results of a randomised testing.

In 2006, a 135-year vertical collection (containing every vintage from 1860 to 2003) was sold by The Antique Wine Company in London for $1.5 million, one of the highest prices ever paid for a single lot of wine. Also that year, Dior and Château d'Yquem together created a skin care product made from the sap of the Yquem vines.

In July 2011, an 1811 bottle of Château d'Yquem sold for £75,000 ($117,000) at The Ritz Hotel, London to a private collector, Christian Vannequé, to become the most expensive bottle of white wine ever sold.

== Production ==
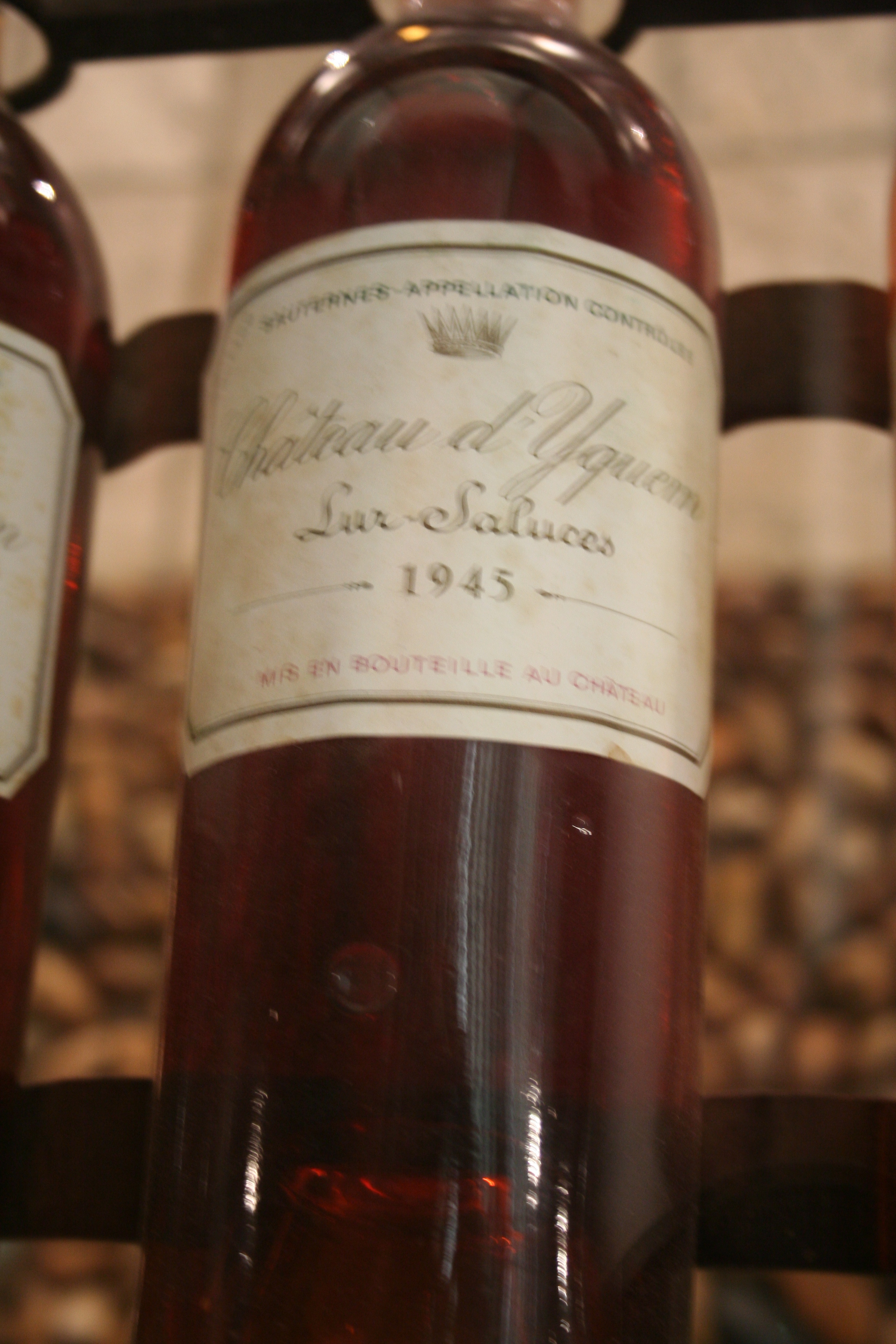
A bottle of 1945 d'Yquem showing the color change that this white wine goes through as it ages

The vineyard has 126 hectares (310 acres) in the Sauternes appellation, though only 100 hectares (250 acres) are in production at any time. Each year, vines from two to three hectares are grubbed up and left fallow for a year. Since grapes from newly planted vines are not worthy of the chateau name for five to seven years, about 20 hectares are held in reserve each year. The vines consist of 80% Sémillon and 20% Sauvignon blanc, though the latter's vigour implies the proportions are more nearly equal in the final wine.

Harvesting is carefully timed, and on average six tries through the vineyard are undertaken each year to ensure that only the botrytized grapes are selected. The yield averages nine hectolitres per hectare (2.5 acres), compared to the usual twelve to twenty hectolitres per hectare in Sauternes. The grapes are pressed three times and transferred to oak barrels for maturation over a period of about three years.

On average, 65,000 bottles are produced each year. In a poor vintage, the entire crop is deemed unworthy of bearing the Château's name and sold anonymously; this happened nine times in the 20th century: 1910, 1915, 1930, 1951, 1952, 1964, 1972, 1974, and 1992 and in the 21st century one time: 2012.

== Vintages ==
Chateau d'Yquem vintages
Great vintages	1825	1847	1865	1870	1893	1904	1921	1937	1947	1959	1967	1983	1986	1988	1990	1995	1997	2001	2003
Years without vintages						1910	1915	1930	1951	1952	1964	1972	1974		1992				2012

== See also ==
- Château Raymond-Lafon
