= Château Suau (Capian) =

Coordinates: 44°41′37″N 0°19′27″W

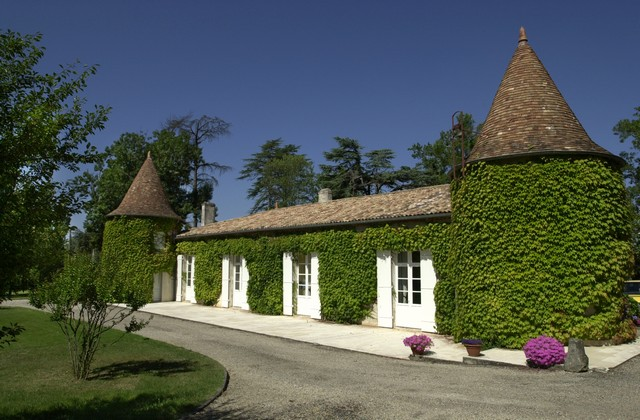
Château Suau in Capian

Château Suau is a French vineyard located south of the village of Capian in the Bordeaux area. It sits at the highest point of the Cadillac-côtes-de-Bordeaux appellation. Château Suau produces organic wines.

== History ==
According to legends, Château Suau began as a hunting lodge in the 16th century. At the time, it belonged to Jean Louis de Nogaret de La Valette, Duke of Épernon. It was not until 1637 that it was restored and named in honor of the new owners: the Suau family. The estate was bought in 1687 by a wine merchant named Clement Popp of Bordeaux described as the Lord of Suau. At one point in its history the estate belonged to Franco-Columbus Fenwick, U.S consul in Nantes. In 1857, the domain passed into the hands of Jean Guénant, Receiver general of the island Réunion who, with the help of his son, had to fight the phylloxera epidemic of 1870, introducing the first vine grafts. The estate was sold and resold several times before being acquired in 1986 by the current owner: the Bonnet family.

== Wine and grapes ==
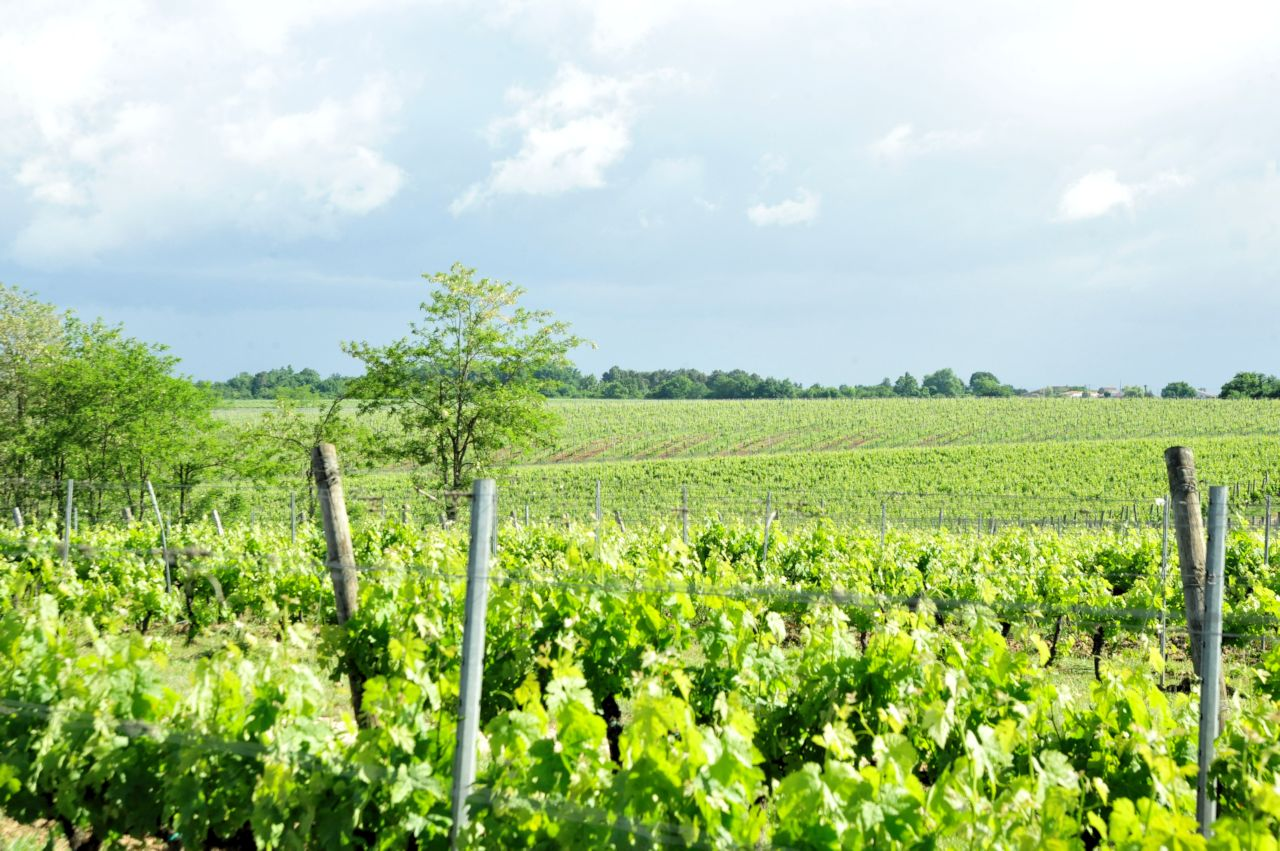
Château Suau (Capian) vineyard

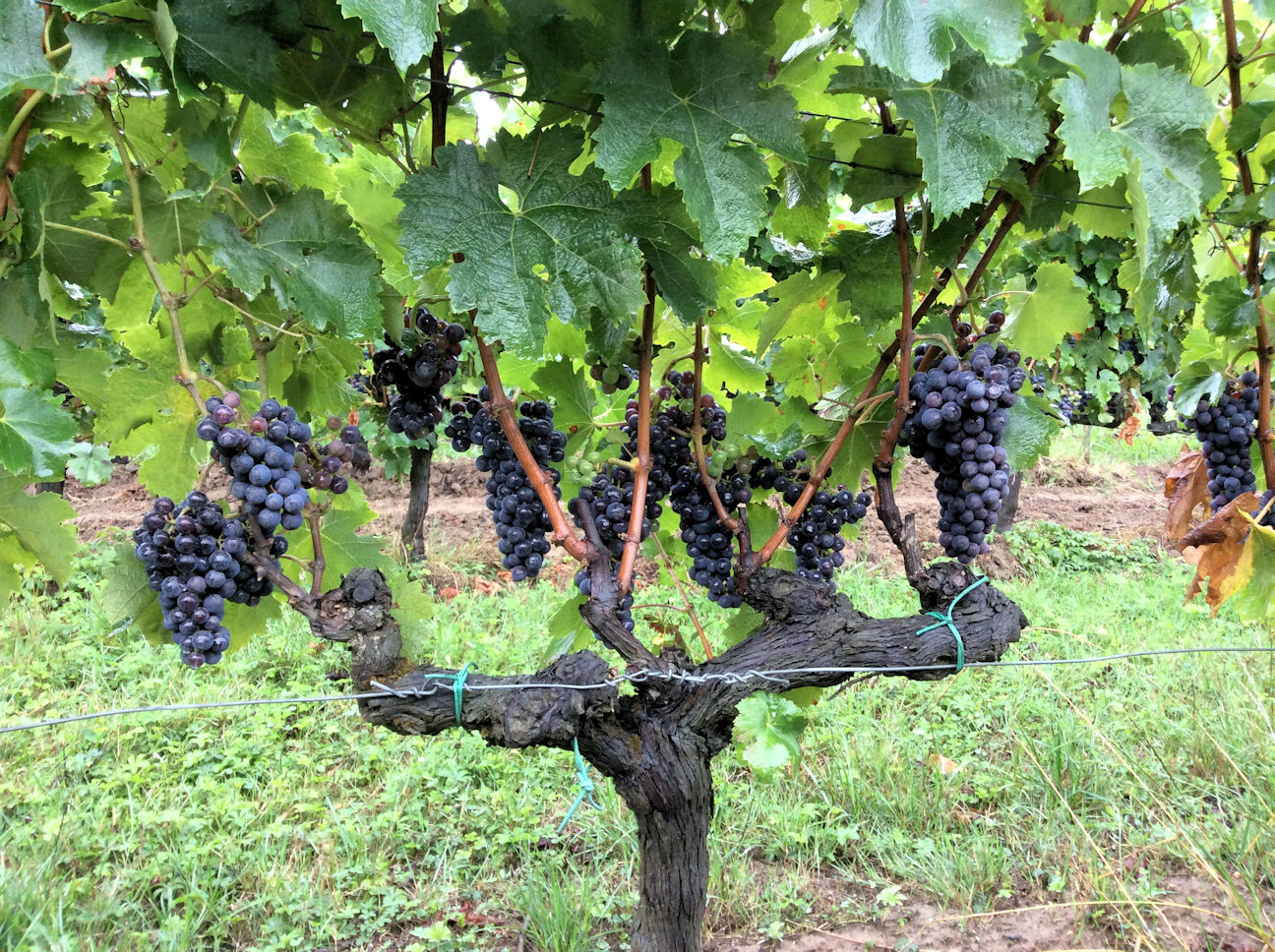
Merlot grapes, Château Suau (Capian)

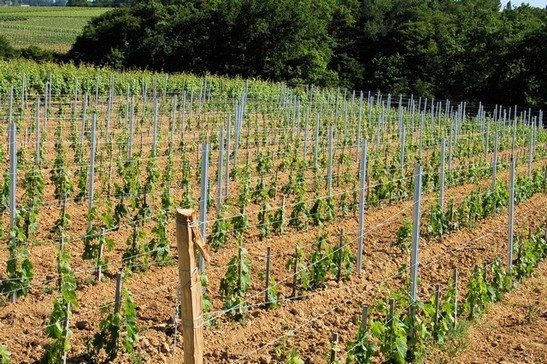
Organic farming at Château Suau

Facing south-southeast, this Entre-Deux-Mers vineyard has a soil consisting mainly of clay and gravel.
It is planted with Merlot 51%, Cabernet Sauvignon 28%, Cabernet Franc 4% and Malbec 3% grapes for the reds. Sauvignon blanc 8%, Sauvignon gris 1% and Sémillon 5% for the whites.
The planting density is 5000 plants / ha for white vines and 7000 vines / ha for red vines.
In 2008, the estate started progressively to convert into organic farming. The conversion was completed in 2012 and since 2014, the entire production is organic wines.

The first certified organic wine was the Château Maubert 2011 (Cadillac-AOC- Côtes-de-Bordeaux).

Each year, the estate produces a Château Suau Rouge AOC - Côte-de-Bordeaux -, a Château Rouge AOC - Côte Maubert Bordeaux-. As well as the Château Suau Bordeaux AOC - Bordeaux Blanc Sec- and the Château Suau Rosé.

Château Suau, Red Artolie Cadillac AOC - Côtes-de-Bordeaux-, Château Suau Red Cadillac, AOC- Cadillac Côtes-de-Bordeaux- and Château Suau Sweet White Cadillac AOC, (Dessert wines), are produced only when the quality of the grapes is good enough to achieve these cuvées.

In 2013, Château Suau joined the first Bordeaux wines association for an Environmental management system (EMS) and is Ecovert and ISO 14001 certified.

== Bibliography ==
- GUILLON Edouard - Historic Castles and wine of the Gironde - Bordeaux: Coderc, and Degréteau Poujol. 1866-1869, Vol 4, p. 393.
- Manthe René, The Barony of Capian and the Priory of Artolée - historical and archaeological Notes - Bordeaux Archaeological Society 1892 - t XVII, p. 55 - 57
- Cocks & Féret: ISBN 978-0470250129.
- Charles Cocks, Edouard Feret: Bordeaux et ses vins, G. Masson, 1922, (9th edition), 1886, and 3rd edition,1874.

== See also ==
- Regional Bordeaux AOCs
- List of grape varieties
- Terroir
