= Barsac, Gironde =

Barsac
- Commune
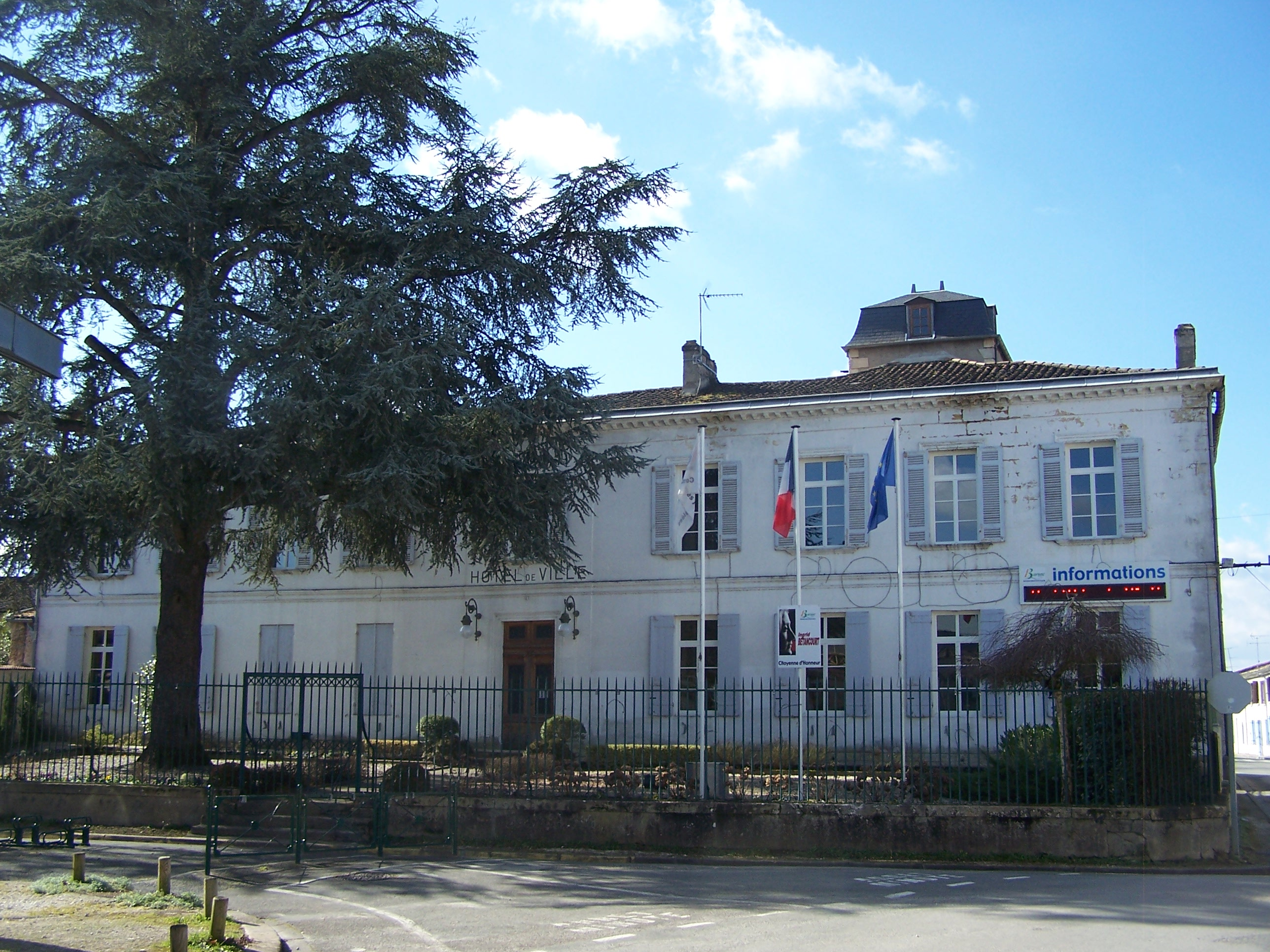
- Town hall

- Coat of arms
- Location of Barsac
- Location within France Location within Nouvelle-Aquitaine
- Coordinates: 44°36′37″N 0°18′47″W
- Country: France
- Region: Nouvelle-Aquitaine
- Department: Gironde
- Arrondissement: Langon
- Canton: Les Landes des Graves

Government
  - Mayor (2020–2026): Dominique Cavaillols
- Area^{1}: 14.48 km^{2} (5.59 sq mi)
- Elevation: 8 m (26 ft)
- Highest elevation: 21 m (69 ft)
- Lowest elevation: 3 m (9.8 ft)
- Population (2023): 2,058
  - Density: 142.1/km^{2} (368.1/sq mi)
- Time zone: UTC+01:00 (CET)
  - Summer (DST): UTC+02:00 (CEST)
- INSEE/Postal code: 33030 /33720
- ^{1} French Land Register data, which excludes lakes, ponds, glaciers > 1 km^{2} (0.386 sq mi or 247 acres) and river estuaries.

Barsac (French pronunciation: [baʁsak]; Gascon: Barçac) is a commune on the left bank of the Garonne river in the Gironde department in southwestern France.

== Geography ==
Barsac is located 37 km upstream on the Garonne river from Bordeaux. Barsac station has rail connections to Langon and Bordeaux.

== Population ==
Historical population
| Year | Pop. | ±% p.a. |
|---|---|---|
| 1968 | 2,298 | — |
| 1975 | 2,019 | −1.83% |
| 1982 | 2,085 | +0.46% |
| 1990 | 2,058 | −0.16% |
| 1999 | 1,948 | −0.61% |
| 2007 | 1,962 | +0.09% |
| 2012 | 2,106 | +1.43% |
| 2017 | 2,063 | −0.41% |
| 2023 | 2,058 | −0.04% |
Source: INSEE

== Wine ==
The town gives its name to a wine making appellation, Barsac AOC, that produces sweet white wines.

The town and its vineyards are separated from the area of Sauternes to the south by the Ciron river, whose cooling effect is of key importance in encouraging the annual action of the Botrytis fungus on the Sémillon grapes. The area is marginally flatter than its neighbour and its wines are considered to be marginally lighter. The area is however permitted to use the Sauternes appellation.

Producers from the area include the First Growths Château Climens, and Château Coutet.

== Personalities ==
- Venerable Marie-Thérèse de Lamourous (1754 – 1836), a French Lay-woman, member of the underground Church during the French Revolution, and foundress of the Sister of the Miséricorde of Bordeaux.

== See also ==
- Communes of the Gironde département
- Bordeaux wine regions
