= Sauternes, Gironde =

Sauternes
- Commune
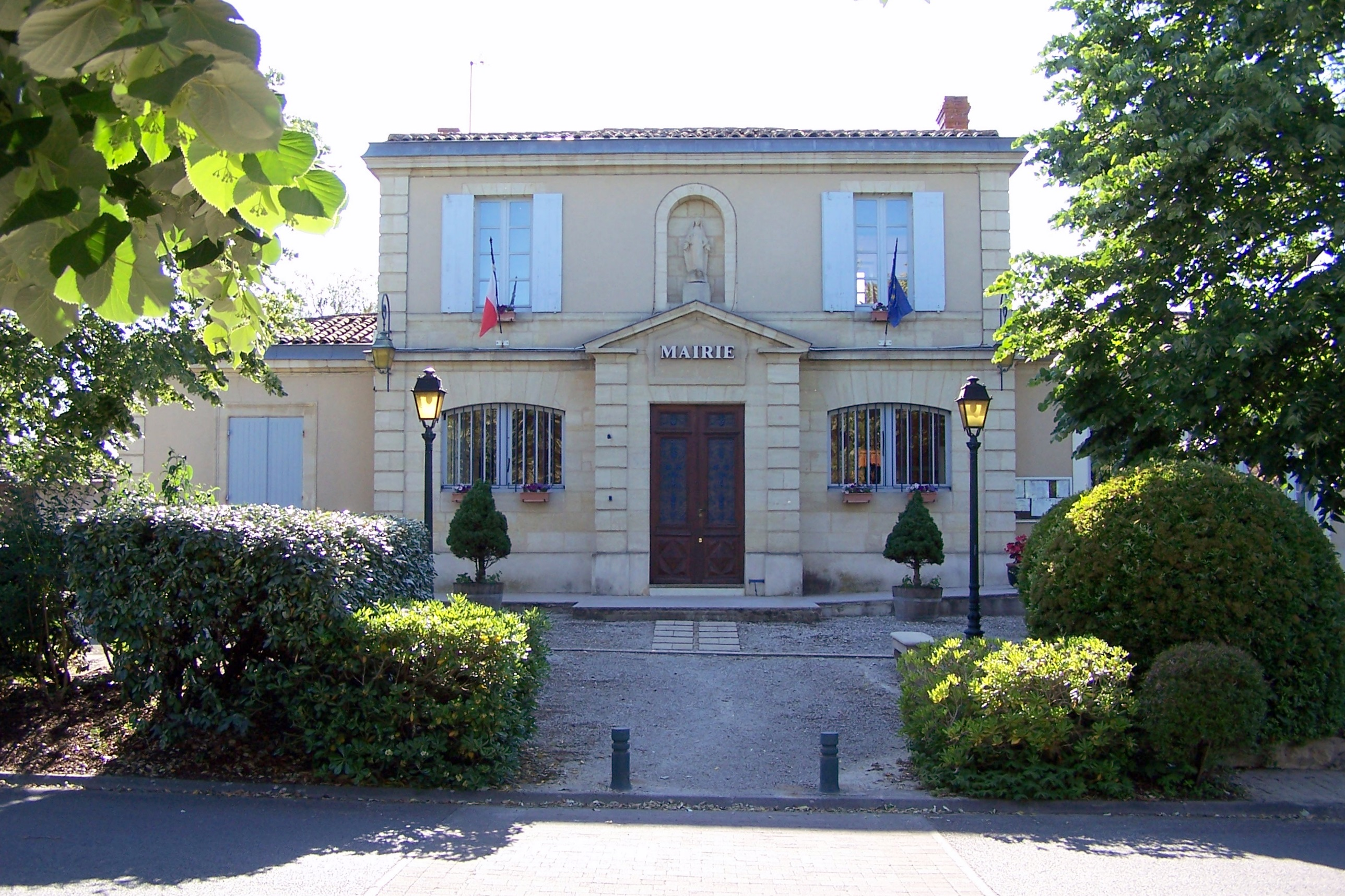
- The town hall in Sauternes

- Coat of arms
- Location of Sauternes
- Location within France Location within Nouvelle-Aquitaine
- Coordinates: 44°31′58″N 0°20′29″W
- Country: France
- Region: Nouvelle-Aquitaine
- Department: Gironde
- Arrondissement: Langon
- Canton: Le Sud-Gironde

Government
  - Mayor (2020–2026): Yann Marot
- Area^{1}: 11.32 km^{2} (4.37 sq mi)
- Elevation: 80 m (260 ft)
- Highest elevation: 89 m (292 ft)
- Lowest elevation: 13 m (43 ft)
- Population (2023): 788
  - Density: 69.6/km^{2} (180/sq mi)
- Time zone: UTC+01:00 (CET)
  - Summer (DST): UTC+02:00 (CEST)
- INSEE/Postal code: 33504 /33210
- ^{1} French Land Register data, which excludes lakes, ponds, glaciers > 1 km^{2} (0.386 sq mi or 247 acres) and river estuaries.

Sauternes (French pronunciation: [sotɛʁn]; Occitan: Sautèrnas) is a commune in the Gironde department in Nouvelle-Aquitaine in southwestern France.

It is also a wine region within the Graves portion of Bordeaux that produces sweet white dessert wines, named "Sauternes" after the commune, as well as some dry white wine.

== Population ==
Historical population
Year	Pop.	±% p.a.
1968	582	—
1975	580	−0.05%
1982	578	−0.05%
1990	589	+0.24%
1999	586	−0.06%
2007	693	+2.12%
2012	752	+1.65%
2017	790	+0.99%
2023	788	−0.04%
Source: INSEE

== See also ==
- Sauternes (wine)
- Bordeaux wine regions
- Communes of the Gironde department
