= Dubourdieu =

Dubourdieu is a French-language surname. People with the name include:

- Bernard Dubourdieu (1773–1811), French admiral
- Denis Dubourdieu (1949-2016), French wine scientist and winemaker
- Frédéric Dubourdieu (1879–1944) early 20th century French olympic fencer
- Isaac Dubourdieu (approx 1597-1700), French reformed minister
- Jean Dubourdieu (approx 1642-1720), French Protestant minister
- Dubourdieu (cyclist), French cyclist who competed in the 1900 Summer Olympics
