= Doisy =

Doisy may refer to:

People:

- Edward Adelbert Doisy (1893–1986), American biochemist, Nobel laureate

In wine:

- Château Doisy Daëne, Bordeaux wine producer of Sauternes
- Château Doisy-Dubroca, Bordeaux wine producer of Sauternes
- Château Doisy-Védrines, Bordeaux wine producer of Sauternes
