= Château Doisy =

Château Doisy may refer to several Bordeaux wine producer of Sauternes:

- Château Doisy Daëne
- Château Doisy-Dubroca
- Château Doisy-Védrines
