= Winemaking in Bordeaux =

Winemaking in Bordeaux is the collection of processes used to make Bordeaux wine. Winemaking in Bordeaux differs from winemaking in other places both because of the Bordelais climate and because of the particular Bordeaux style which the wine-maker is aiming for. A large number of processes are involved: pruning, training, spraying, (green harvesting), harvesting, (sorting), (de-stemming), crushing, fermentation, pressing, barrel-ageing, blending, bottling and bottle-ageing.

== Viticulture ==
=== Pests ===
Bordeaux is a relatively humid region. Thus it is a place rife with diseases and other problems that afflict vines, compared with many of the world's other wine regions, such as Chile or Australia. oidium, mildew, coulure (failure of the flowers), millerandage (irregular ripening of the grapes), Eutypiose, Esca, Vers de la grappe and Botrytis (can be beneficial—see Sauternes) are the most common diseases or problems that occur.

=== Pruning ===
In Bordeaux, the pruning of the vine happens almost always as cane-pruning (as opposed to spur-pruning). There are two types of cane-pruning: guyot simple and guyot double. The simple way is frequently seen on the right bank, double most often on the left. Related to pruning is the trellising, where vines are dispersed along wires. It has become increasingly popular to raise the height of the trellis to the benefit of the grapes but to the discomfort for the vigneron.

=== Use of fertilizer and other chemicals ===
The use of chemical sprays and fertilizers has dropped in the recent decades in Bordeaux. Forty years ago, using fertilizers and different herbicides and fungicides were common, and made work easier for the manager. It also lowered the quality of the grapes, however. This use is still taking place in Bordeaux—but less and less so. Fertilizers, if used at all, are now more commonly supplied by compost, rather than man-made chemicals. Ploughing has replaced many pesticides and de-leafing has replaced fungicide use. While a healthier approach to agriculture has certainly come to Bordeaux, the châteaux have not adopted the biodynamic trend so popular in other wine regions, though Bordeaux is not entirely unfamiliar with the concept as 25 % of the vines arevdedicated to certified organic cultivation without chemical fertilisers and pesticides. Instead, the lutte raisonnée method is gaining ground.

=== Green harvesting ===
Bordeaux has seen a rise in the use of green harvesting, where unripe bunches are cut off in the summer in order to channel more of the plant's strength to the remaining bunches. While it is a popular process, it also has its opponents, such as Jean Gautreau of Château Sociando-Mallet, Gonzague Lurton of Château Durfort-Vivens and Olivier Bernard of Domaine de Chevalier, who claim that the remaining berries simply grow bigger, not better. Green harvesting requires cheap labor, often ignorant of properly cutting vines. Opponents point to vintages 1929 and 1947, which were high-yield and of great quality—and made entirely without green harvest techniques.

=== Harvesting ===
When harvest time approaches the Bordeaux wine producers start getting anxious. Unlike many other wine regions, weather in Bordeaux is relatively unstable and sudden changes in weather can delay a harvest, force a harvest in bad weather (diluting the wine) or severely damage the harvest. The appellations around Sauternes are even more vulnerable as certain micro-climatic conditions has to arrive plus they are forced to harvest late, risking the entire harvest to bad weather. Today the Bordelais Châteaux focus increasingly on the right time of harvest related to ripeness of the grapes. Cabernet grapes don't mature at the same rate as Merlot and thus picking both grapes at the same time rarely makes sense if optimal ripeness is sought. Thierry Manoncourt (Château Figeac) recollects: "In the past the whole vineyard would have been picked in eight days. Today it takes us twenty to thirty days."

In Bordeaux, hand picking is now common among the more prestigious châteaux. But while hand-picking is foremost, some classified châteaux still harvest by machine. Mechanical harvesting also has its advantages, such as flexibility: it makes possible harvesting at night, which is preferable during hot weather. While the harvesting machines today have advanced in technology making them still more attractive, the delicate and selective process of harvesting by hand is still the best way to secure a maximum quality harvest. One problem with manual harvesting is the sheer size of vineyards in Bordeaux (not to mention the labor cost of hand-picking), with tens of thousands of hectares needing harvesting within a few weeks. The flatter geography of Bordeaux also allows for mechanical harvesting, whereas the steep slopes of wine-producing areas such as Côte-Rôtie make machine harvesting nearly impossible.

=== Yields ===
Yields in Bordeaux, as is the case in all other French AOCs, are capped by administrative rules. In Bordeaux this cap is 60 hl/ha with the option to raise yields by 20% by permission from the INAO. Any excess wine is sent for distillation. The yield is essential for the quality of the wine along with many other factors such as terroir. When making wine from a mediocre terroir, the producer has to lower his yields more than if it came from a superior terroir if he wants the wine to be of similar quality. In Bordeaux the recent decades have seen more and more focus on low yields. In the 1980s it was common, even for prestigious châteaux, to harvest the legal maximum. The reason is clear: if you have a good (expensive) label it is tempting to harvest 40, 50 or 60 hl/ha rather than 30 hl/ha as it means more money. But hl/ha isn't everything: as Michel Cazes of Château Lynch-Bages says:
"When people talk about yields they forget about density. Here in the Médoc we have 10,000 vines per hectare. The crop expressed in hectolitres tells you nothing. Here in Pauillac and St-Julien and St-Estèphe I am sure that fifty to sixty is about right. Latour always had some of the highest yields in the region, but that was because none of their vines were missing"

== Winemaking ==
In Bordeaux, almost all wines are blended. Only a few producers make single-variety or varietal wines, though the lack of naming grape varieties on labels masks the fact. The typical blend consists of Merlot and Cabernet Sauvignon and/or Cabernet Franc, with small additions of Petit Verdot and Malbec and very occasionally Carmenere. Merlot is favored on the right bank of the Gironde River system, and Cabernet Sauvignon on the left, though Merlot acreage has been increasing on the left bank over the last decade or two. Today, winemaking in Bordeaux is a highly controlled process, with widespread use of stainless steel vats for fermentation, cooling apparatus, and a high degree of hygienic discipline. In 1951, chaptalization (adding sugar) became legal (it had likely taken place illegally prior to 1951). The use of chaptalization is common in Bordeaux, except in the warmest of vintages, and especially on the left bank, where Cabernet Sauvignon dominates and ripens later than Merlot.

=== Grape processing ===
Today, sorting and de-stemming are common techniques in Bordeaux and have been for some time. Great efforts have been made to improve these processes. Technology has also affected the crushing of the grapes, which had been done by treading since ancient times. More recently, machines have made crushing cheaper and safer, but they are less gentle with the grapes—breaking the pips releases unwanted tannins into the must. Today, some châteaux, such as Château Smith-Haut-Lafitte, do not crush the grapes at all, letting the fermentation begin within each grape (a process widely used in the Beaujolais region).

To move the grapes, a number of wineries have stopped using pumps. Instead, after the crushing, they raise the grapes by conveyor belt. This is a gentler process, using gravity, rather than a pumping system.

=== Fermentation ===
Fermentation usually takes place in stainless steel vats, a technique introduced in the 1960s (lined cement vats were introduced already in the 1920s), to improve hygiene and control over the fermentation process (especially of temperature). During the 1980s, some producers began reintroducing wooden fermentation vats. There are pros and cons with all types of vats, and their role in winemaking seems less important than other elements in the process.

Use of concentrators, where a winemaker can remove water from the must, is common in Bordeaux. Some producers (Christian Moueix of Pétrus, Anthony Barton of Château Leoville-Barton, Philippe Dhalluin of Château Mouton-Rothschild) are opposed to concentration, although others (such as Château Pomeaux) are big fans. While this process can certainly improve a wine in mediocre years, it is also open to abuse—with the result being an over-concentrated and poorly balanced wine.

=== Pressing ===
After fermentation comes the pressing. Bordeaux, along with other regions, has switched from hydraulic presses to the pneumatic press, where a pneumatic bladder filled with air results in a more gentle pressing of the wine. A third type of press is the vertical or hydraulic press. This is the most traditional, and also a gentle, type of press. However, is a very labour-intensive process.

=== Oxygenation ===
The modern, and very popular, method of micro-oxygenation, where microscopic amounts of oxygen are added to the wine during fermentation to stabilize (green) tannins and anthocyanins, has also caught on in Bordeaux. The most prestigious châteaux avoid the procedure, preferring to harvest grapes without green tannins. Micro-oxygenation is also used later in the process, during élevage, as a way of avoiding racking and controlling the amount of oxygen applied to the wine. (Racking allows for no such control). In this stage, however, the prestigious châteaux have fewer reservations, although not all producers are fans of micro-oxygenation during élevage.

=== Aging ===
In Bordeaux, most serious wines undergo barrel-ageing, although white wines can be an exception. Usually, six months of ageing in-barrel is required, but some châteaux barrel-age for as much as 20 months. The number of new barrels (which impart a higher degree of oak flavor to the wine) can vary from vintage to vintage, just as the duration of barrel-ageing. Only recently, addition of oak chips has been made legal in Bordeaux. During barrel-ageing, the wine needs to be racked in order to clear it of lees. This process is being challenged by some producers, since ageing on the lees can also add richness to the wine.

=== Blending ===
Once the producer decides the wine has aged for the right amount of time, the selection begins. The winemaker (or his/her team) find the right blend for the vintage. This is released as the château's grand vin. Inevitably, there will be some wine left—either of inferior quality or leftovers from the blending. This is usually released as a second-wine (or in some cases even a third-wine). While in theory inferior wine, some châteaux second-wine is of superior quality to other châteaux' grand vin and fetches high prices. Increasing the amount of second-wine can be a very conscious decision on the part of a winemaker, as a way of making a more and more superior grand vin - able to compete with the most prestigious wines in tastings.

After blending, the wine will be bottled, and will then usually undergo a further ageing process before being released.

In Bordeaux the oenologists play a huge role. Many oenologists work as consultants to different châteaux and carry much weight in major decisions regarding the wine. Amongst the most famous oenologists are Emile Peynaud, Jacques Boissenot, Pascal Chantonnet, Olivier Dauga, Stéphane Derenoncourt, Denis Dubourdieu, Jean-Philippe Fort, Gilles Pauquet, Michel Rolland, Stéphane Toutoundji and Christian Veyry.
