= Château La Tour Blanche =

Coordinates: 44.5428°N 0.3507°W

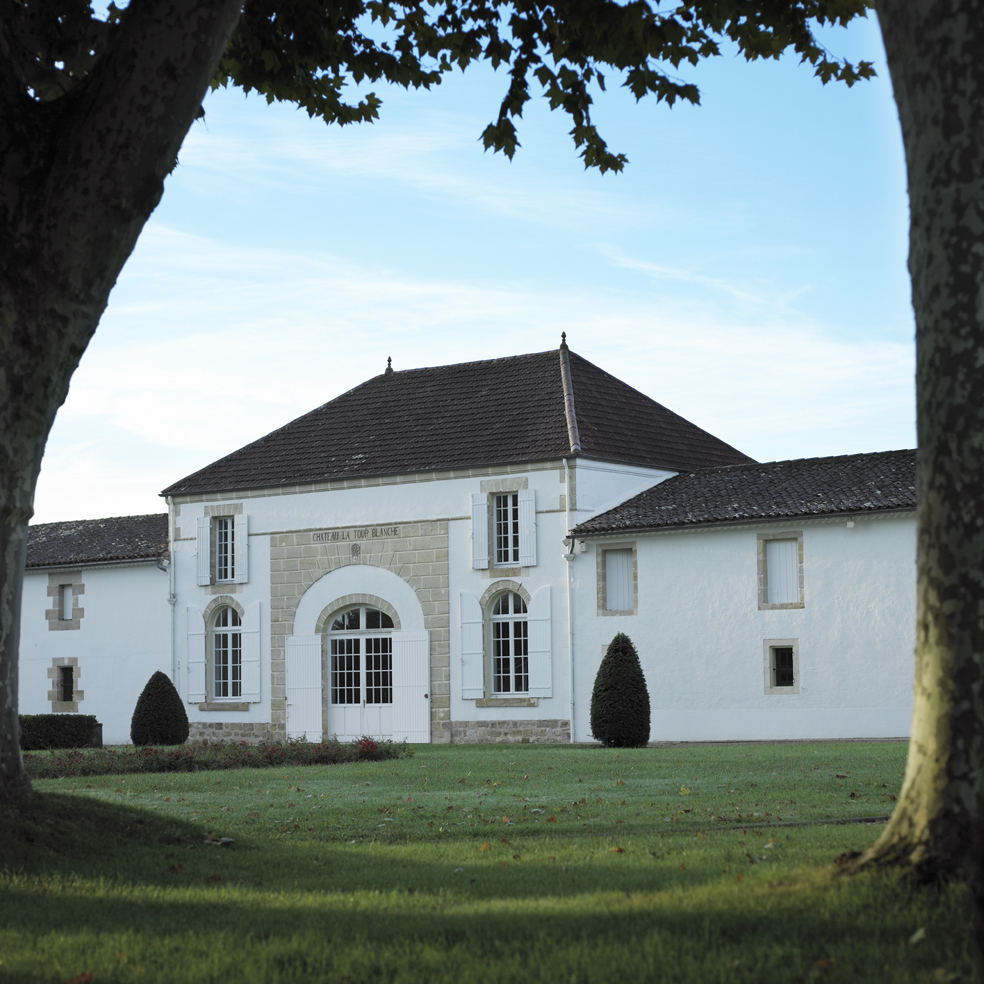
View of the estate.

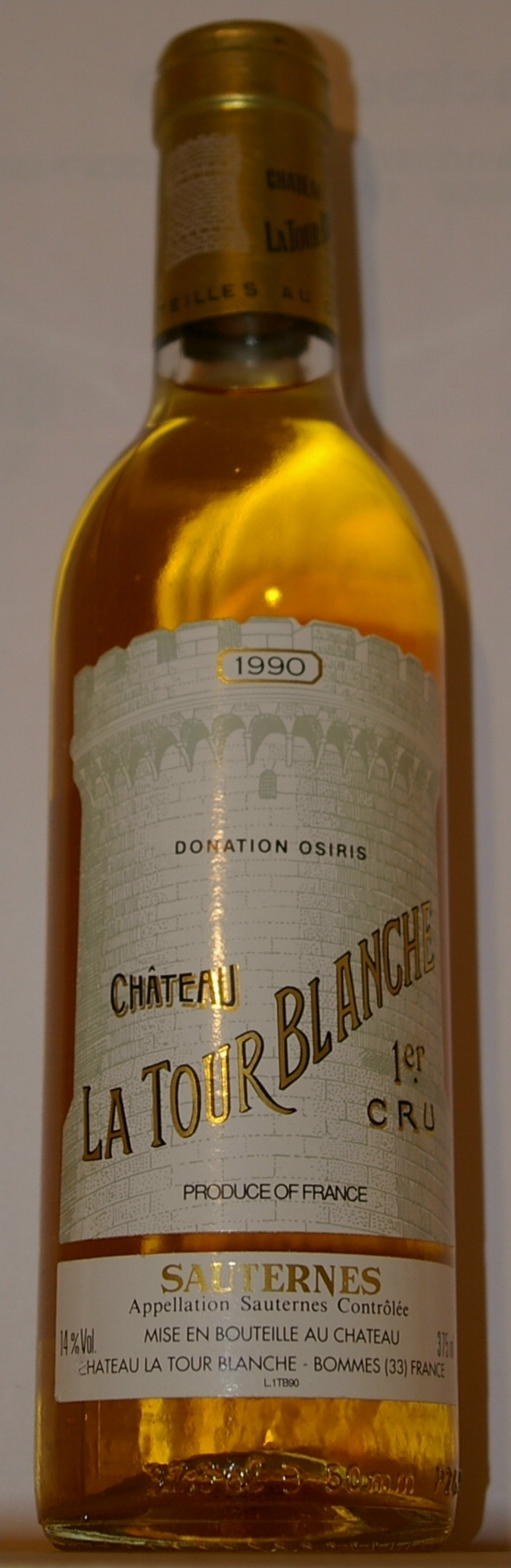
A bottle of Château La Tour Blanche 1990

Château La Tour Blanche, or La Tour-Blanche, is a sweet white wine ranked as Premier Cru Classé (French, “First Growth”) in the original Bordeaux Wine Official Classification of 1855. Belonging to the Sauternes appellation in Gironde, in the region of Graves, the winery is located in the commune of Bommes.

Uniquely among classed growth wineries, the estate is the property of the French state, and the site of the La Tour Blanche School of Viticulture and Oenology.

== History ==
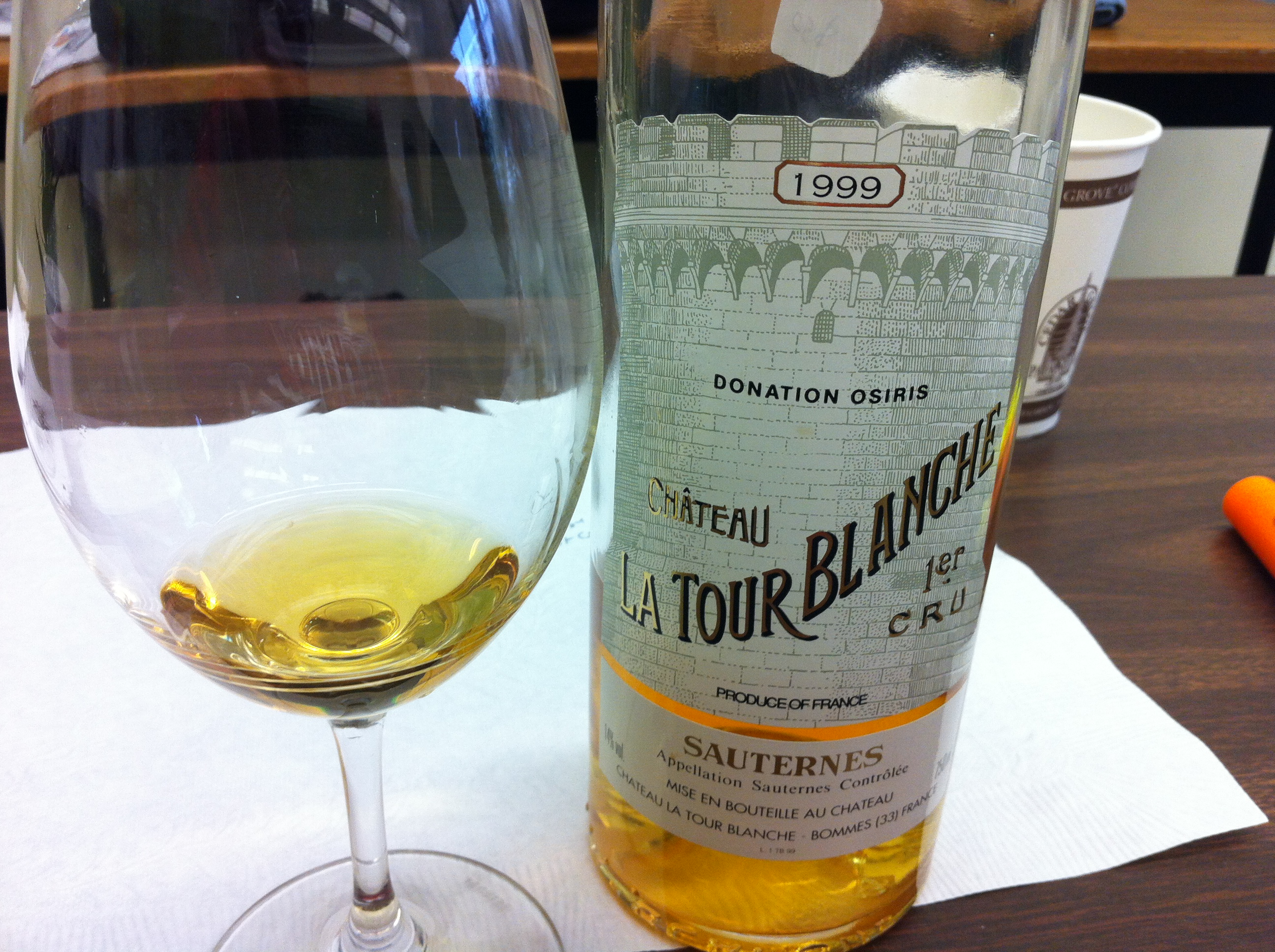
The 1999 vintage of La Tour Blanche.

Records date the estate's origins to the 18th century, and connect them to Jean Saint-Marc du Latourblanche, treasurer-general to Louis XIV. Following the French Revolution, the estate was owned by Pierre Pécherie, but a later owner, the German Frederic Focke raised the reputation of the winery, and was for a period credited with bringing the tradition of sweet white wine to Sauternes from his Rhine origins. After the rewarding outcome of the 1855 Classification and Focke's death, the estate was eventually acquired by Daniel "Osiris" Iffla who among several patriotic acts, testamented La Tour Blanche to the State upon his death in 1907, on the condition it would become an agricultural college. From 1911, the La Tour Blanche School of Viticulture and Oenology has been responsible for education and training of wine industry professionals, as well as running La Tour Blanche as a classed winery.

== Production ==
The estate contains 65 hectares (160 acres) with grape varieties of 83% Sémillon, 12% Sauvignon blanc and 5% Muscadelle, as well as a smaller cultivation of the red grape varieties Merlot, Cabernet Franc and Cabernet Sauvignon. Annual production averages 4,000 cases of La Tour Blanche, in addition to the Second wine Les Charmilles de La Tour Blanche, annually averaging 1,250 cases.

In smaller quantities, the estate produces the dry white wine Les Jardins de Thinoy, the dry white wine Isis, the demi-sec Osiris, and the red wine Cru de Cinquet.
