= Château Rabaud-Promis =

Coordinates: 44.5551°N 0.3386°W

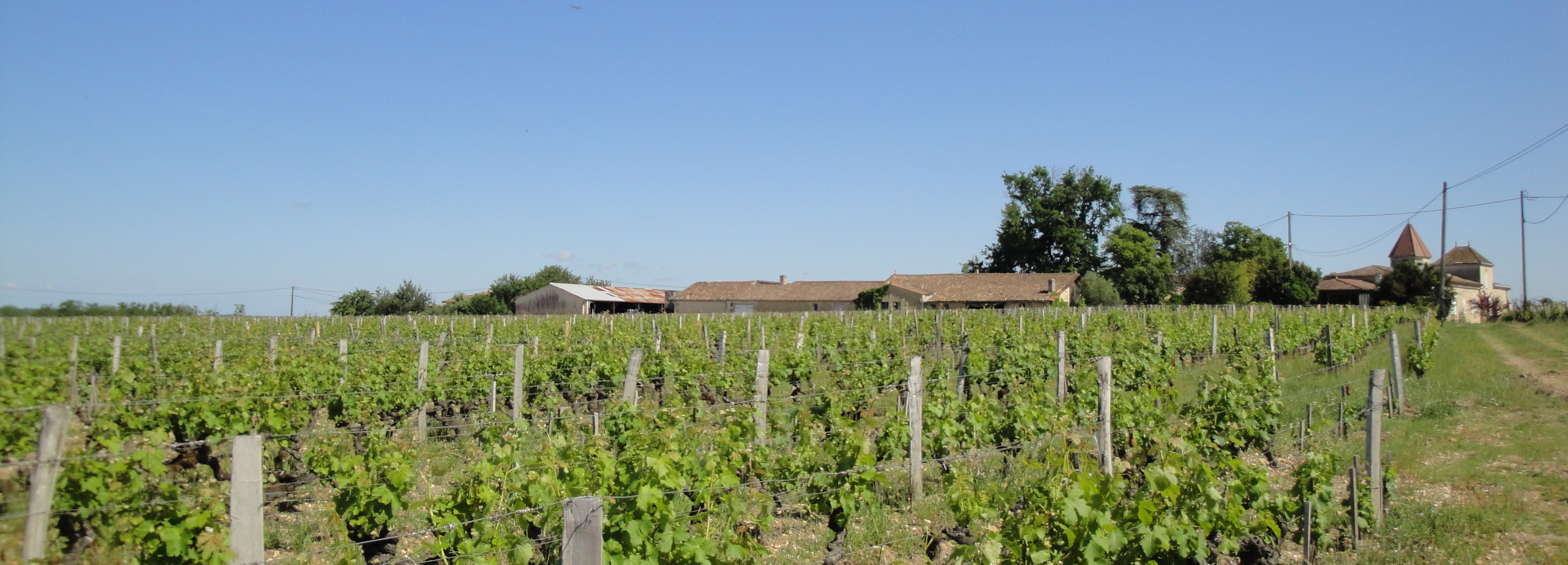
Château Rabaud-Promis and some of its vineyards

Château Rabaud-Promis is a Bordeaux wine producer in the Sauternes appellation. Its sweet white wine ranked as Premier Cru Classé (French, “First Growth”) in the original Bordeaux Wine Official Classification of 1855. It is located in the commune of Bommes in the region of Graves. It was once joined with Château Sigalas-Rabaud in the estate named Château Rabaud.

== History ==
The history of the Rabaud estate goes back to 1660, when it came into the ownership of the de Cazeau family, who were magistrates of the parliament of Bordeaux. The last de Cazeau owner, who was also mayor of Bommes, sold Rabaud in 1819 to Gabriel Deyme, who was the owner at the time of the 1855 classification. In 1863, Henri Drouilhet de Sigalas bought Rabaud and added his name to that of the property, creating Rabaud-Sigalas. He also purchased Château Pexoto, a 10 hectares (25 acres) Sauternes property classified as a deuxième cru in 1855, and absorbed it into Rabaud-Sigalas.

In 1903, Henri's only son Pierre-Gaston de Sigalas sold the largest part of the property to Adrien Promis, creating Château Rabaud-Promis. In 1930, after a lease on the Château Sigalas-Rabaud vineyards was not renewed, the Rabaud estate was run as one with Fernand Ginestet as tenant of both Rabaud-Promis and Sigalas-Rabaud. During the 1930s and 1940s, the labels of the wine showed both names. In 1950, the Ginestet family wanted to get rid of their Rabaud holdings in order to buy Château Margaux. The descendants of the Sigalas family descendants were unwilling to own all of Rabaud, and the holdings were sold to the Dejean family, which put an end to the joint running of Rabaud, and since then the two Rabaud estates have been run separately.
