= Château Romer =

Château Romer is a sweet white wine ranked as Second Cru Classé (French, “Second Growth”) in the original Bordeaux Wine Official Classification of 1855. Belonging to the Sauternes appellation in Gironde, in the region of Graves, the estate is located in the commune of Fargues de Langon.

== History ==
The wine estate was probably founded already in the 17th century by the Montalier family, and shares its early history with that of Château Romer du Hayot. In the year 1800, Ferdinand Auguste de Lur-Saluces married a descendant of the founders, Marie Thérèse Gabrielle de Montalier, which for a time made the estate part of the wine empire of the Lur-Saluces family. In 1824, their daughter Louise Alexandrine married Count Anne Auguste Jacques de la Myre-Mory. In 1855, the year of the classification of Bordeaux wine, the estate was named Château Romer, and was classified as a second growth.

In 1881, due to inheritance, the estate was divided in several smaller lots that were passed down to members of the Myre-Mory family. However, the different lots were managed together by one of the inheritors, Comtesse Beaurepaire-Louvagny. In 1911, about 5 hectares (12 acres) of the estate was sold by Myre-Mory to Roger Farges, and this land forms the basis of the current Château Romer which stayed in the Farges family for the next century. Th remaining 9 hectares (22 acres) to 10 hectares (25 acres) were sold in 1937 to Xavier Dauglade and Madame du Hayot, forming Château Romer du Hayot.

Later, the Farges family did not put much emphasis on winemaking. From 1976, the remaining vineyard area had André du Hayot as a tenant farmer, who vinified it at his own property. In 2002, Anne Farges restarted winemaking at Château Romer, with the 2002 vintage the first to reappear under the château's own name.

In 2012, Château Romer was bought by Bernard Magrez.

== Production ==
Château Romer's productive vineyards currently cover 2 hectares (4.9 acres) of a total area of 6.5 hectares (16 acres). The vineyards are planted with 90% Sémillon, 5% Sauvignon blanc and 5% Muscadelle.

Only a single wine, the sweet classified growth Sauternes, is produced. This wine spends 12–18 months in oak barrel, and about 5 000 bottles are produced annually.
