= Château Sigalas-Rabaud =

Coordinates: 44.552967°N 0.339043°W

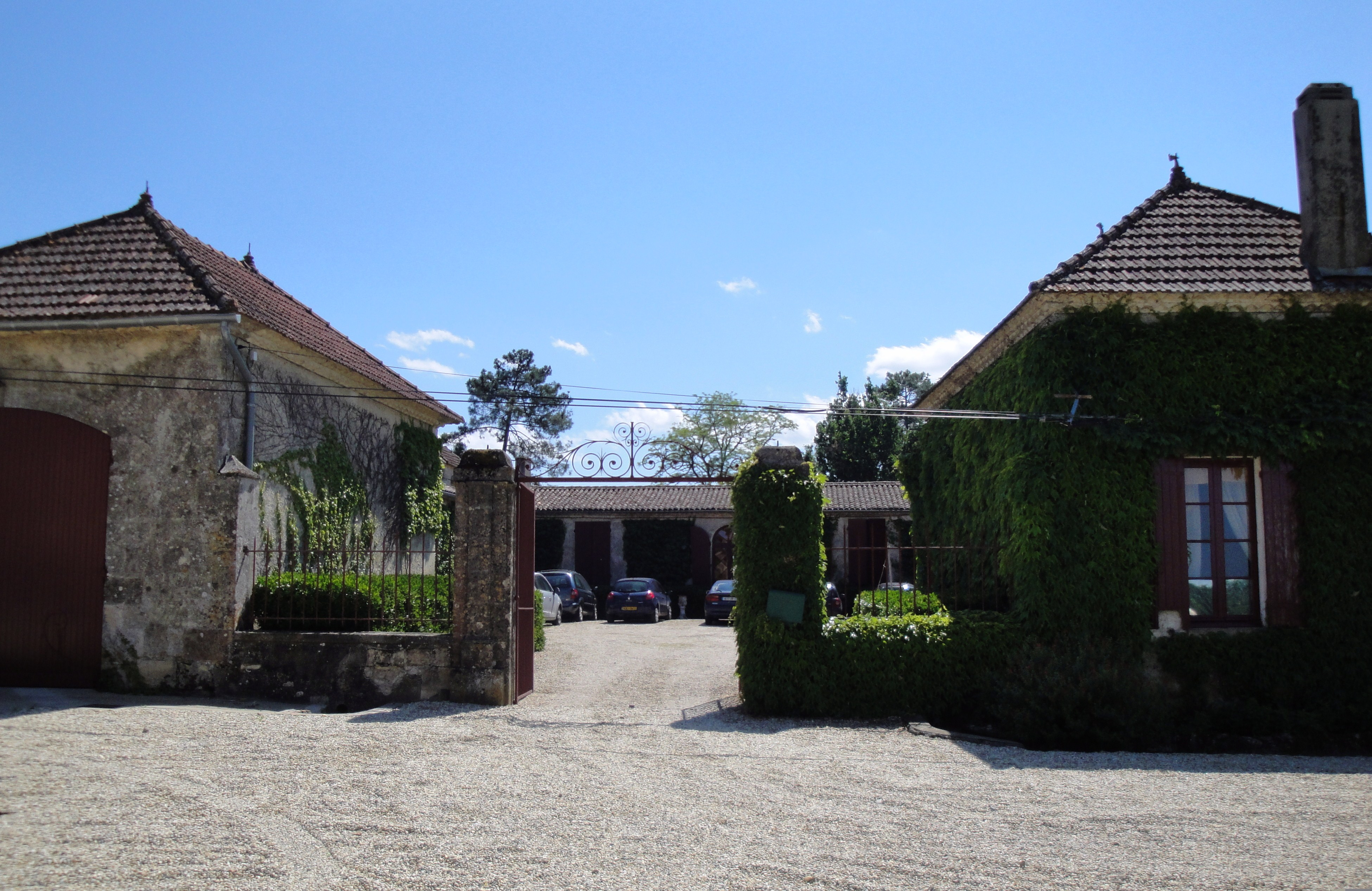
Château Sigalas-Rabaud

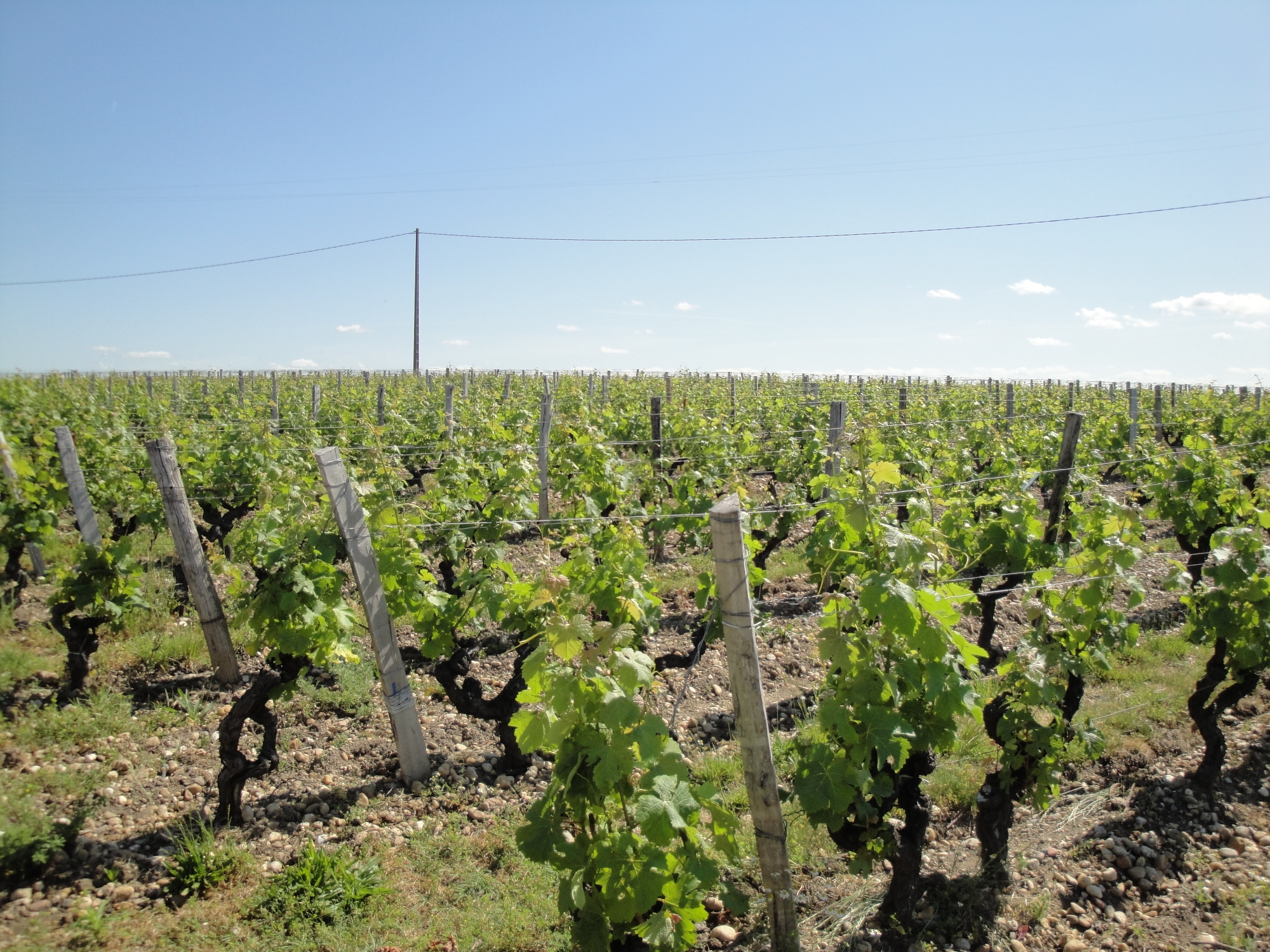
Vineyards of Sigalas-Rabaud

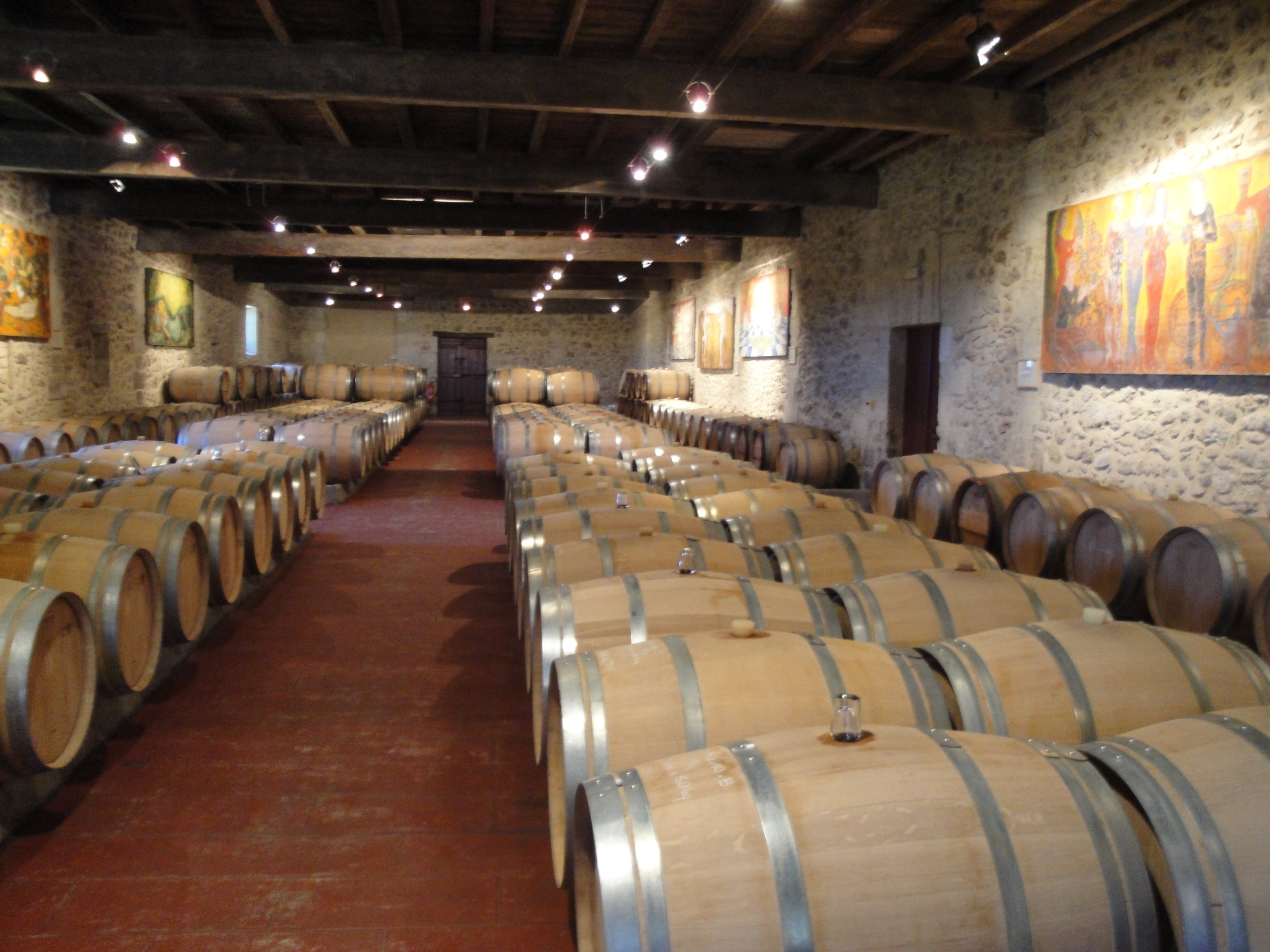
Barrel cellar of Sigalas-Rabaud

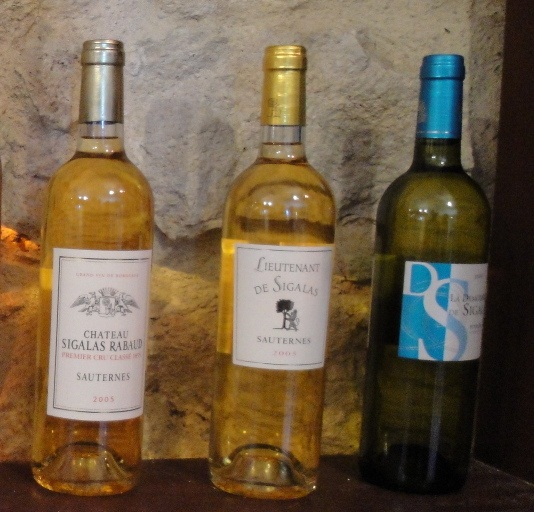
The range of wines produced by Château Sigalas-Rabaud

Château Sigalas-Rabaud, previously also named Château Rabaud-Sigalas, is a Bordeaux wine producer in the Sauternes appellation. Its sweet white wine ranked as Premier Cru Classé (French, “First Growth”) in the original Bordeaux Wine Official Classification of 1855. It is located in the commune of Bommes in the region of Graves. It was once joined with Château Rabaud-Promis in the estate named Château Rabaud. With only 14 hectares (35 acres), Château Sigalas-Rabaud is the smallest of all crus classés of the 1855 classification.

== History ==
The history of the Rabaud estate goes back to 1660, when it came into the ownership of the de Cazeau family, who were magistrates of the parliament of Bordeaux. The last de Cazeau owner, who was also mayor of Bommes, sold Rabaud in 1819 to Gabriel Deyme, who was the owner at the time of the 1855 classification. In 1863, Henri Drouilhet de Sigalas bought Rabaud and added his name to that of the property, creating Rabaud-Sigalas. He also purchased Château Pexoto, a 10 hectares (25 acres) Sauternes property classified as a deuxième cru in 1855, and absorbed it into Rabaud-Sigalas.

In 1903, Henri's only son Pierre-Gaston de Sigalas sold the largest part of the property to Adrien Promis, creating Château Rabaud-Promis. He did however keep the part which he considered to be the best, which he called le bijou de Sigalas ("the jewel of Sigalas"), and which consisted of a gravelly hill with southern exposure. This still makes up the 14 hectares (35 acres) of vineyards of Sigalas-Rabaud. In 1913, he rented out the vineyards.

In 1930, after the lease on the vineyards was not renewed, the Rabaud estate was run as one with Fernand Ginestet as tenant of both Sigalas-Rabaud and Rabaud-Promis. During the 1930s and 1940s, the labels of the wine showed both names. However, these were difficult time for the estate, due to a number of poor vintages in the 1930s and a poor wine market during the World War. In 1950, the Ginestet family wanted to get rid of their Rabaud holdings in order to buy Château Margaux. The descendants of the Sigalas family descendants were unwilling to own all of Rabaud, and the holdings were sold to the Dejean family, which put an end to the joint running of Rabaud. On the Sigalas side, Marquis de Lambert des Granges, whose wife was of the Sigalas family, took control over Sigalas-Rabaud. He invested in a new winery and cellar. Since the marketing situation was difficult at this stage, the approach chosen was to sell it exclusively through a succession of négociant houses, including Savour Club. This resulted in income to cover the fixed costs, but meant that Sigalas-Rabaud was not part of the regular Bordeaux trade.

In 1972 the winery was incorporated as a groupement foncier agricole (GFA), with the capital coming from the four Lambert des Granges children, which was changed to a société anonyme (SA) in 1989 and a société par actions simplifiée (SAS) in 2000. From January 1995 to September 2008, there was a collaboration arrangement with Suez Group, which in 1984 had bought the Cordier Group and therefore owned the neighbouring estate of Château Lafaurie-Peyraguey.

In 2007, Laure de Lambert Compeyrot, daughter of Gerard de Lambert des Granges, took over the daily running of the estate as technical director. With the 2009 vintage, she introduced the first dry white wine of the estate.

== Vineyard ==
Sigalas-Rabaud has 14.25 hectares (35.2 acres) of vineyards, planted with 85% Sémillon, 14% Sauvignon blanc and 1% Muscadelle. The average yield is 17 hectoliter per hectare.

== Wines ==
Château Sigalas-Rabaud produces three wines:

- The Château Sigalas-Rabaud Grand Vin, a Sauternes;
- A second wine called Lieutenant de Sigalas, also a Sauternes;
- A dry white wine called Demoiselle de Sigalas, a Bordeaux Blanc.

Annual production is around 30 000 bottles. Château Sigalas-Rabaud spends 18–24 months in new oak barrels before bottling. The proportion of the production that goes into the second wine depends on the quality of the vintage, and has varied between 0% and 34% in recent years.

The name of the second wine has been Lieutenant de Sigalas since 2004; before that it was known as Cadet de Sigalas.

The first vintage of the dry white wine Demoiselle de Sigalas was 2009, and it was composed of 50% Sémillon and 50% Sauvignon blanc.
