= Château Romer du Hayot =

Coordinates: 44.59284°N 0.34265°W

Château Romer du Hayot is a sweet white wine ranked as Second Cru Classé (French, “Second Growth”) in the original Bordeaux Wine Official Classification of 1855. Belonging to the Sauternes appellation in Gironde, in the region of Graves, the winery is located in the commune of Sauternes.

== History ==
The wine estate was probably founded already in the 17th century by the Montalier family, and shares its early history with that of Château Romer. In the year 1800, Ferdinand Auguste de Lur-Saluces married a descendant of the founders, Marie Thérèse Gabrielle de Montalier, which for a time made the estate part of the wine empire of the Lur-Saluces family. In 1824, their daughter Louise Alexandrine married Count Anne Auguste Jacques de la Myre-Mory. In 1855, the year of the classification of Bordeaux wine, the estate was named Château Romer, and was classified as a second growth.

In 1881, due to inheritance, the estate was divided into several smaller lots that were passed down to members of the Myre-Mory family. However, the different lots were managed together by one of the inheritors, Comtesse Beaurepaire-Louvagny. In 1937, the majority of the former Château Romer vineyards, compromising 9 hectares (22 acres) to 10 hectares (25 acres), were sold to Xavier Dauglade and Madame du Hayot, forming Château Romer du Hayot. The part of the original estate that has remained under the Château Romer name, about 5 hectares (12 acres), had been sold by Myre-Mory to Roger Farges in 1911.

The original estate buildings were torn down in the 1970s, when the E72 road was built, and since then the wines have been vinified off-site by the Du Hayot owners.

== Production ==
Château Romer du Hayot cover an area of 15 hectares (37 acres). The vineyards are planted with 70% Sémillon, 25% Sauvignon blanc and 5% Muscadelle. About 25 000 bottles are produced annually.

Vinification takes place together with the other Sauternes properties of Vignobles Du Hayot, at Château Andoyse in Barsac.
