= Bourdieu (disambiguation) =

Bourdieu may refer to:

== Name ==
- Pierre Bourdieu
- Mathilde Bourdieu
- Emmanuel Bourdieu
- Isaac Bourdieu

== Other ==
- Social capital (Bourdieu)
- Field (Bourdieu)
- Bourdieu v. Pacific Western Oil Co.
- Embodiment theory in anthropology#Pierre Bourdieu
- Structure and agency#Pierre Bourdieu
- Doxa#In sociology and anthropology (Bourdieu)
- Aesthetic taste#Hume, Kant and Bourdieu
