= Ciron =

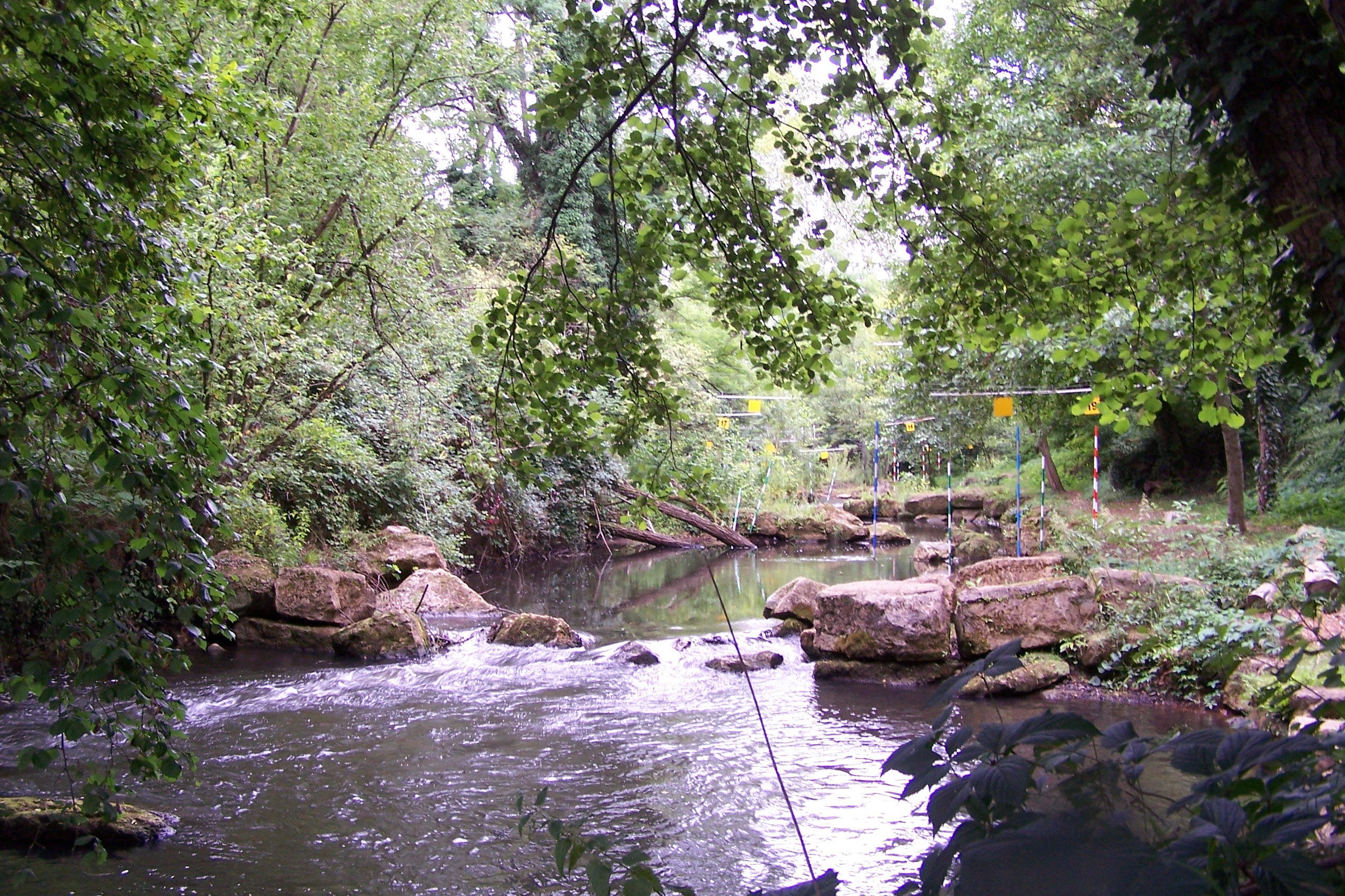

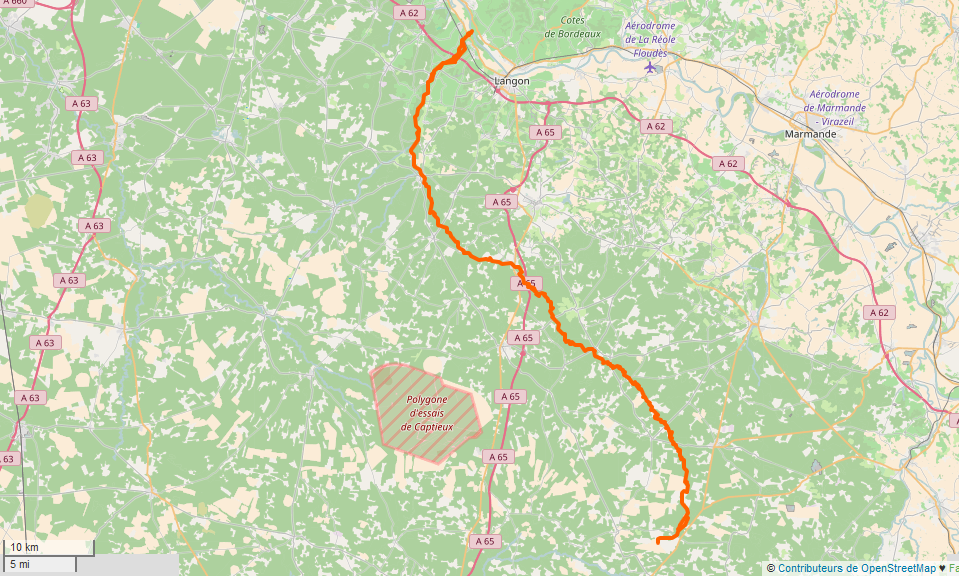

Location
- Country: France

Physical characteristics
- Source
  - location: Landes
  - elevation: 135 m (443 ft)
- Mouth
  - location: Garonne
  - coordinates: 44°36′3″N 0°18′5″W
- Length: 97 km (60 mi)
- Discharge
  - average: 3 m^{3}/s (110 cu ft/s)

Basin features
- Progression: Garonne→ Gironde estuary→ Atlantic Ocean

The Ciron (French pronunciation: [siʁɔ̃]; Occitan: Siron) is a left tributary of the Garonne, in Gironde, Southwest France. It is 96.9 km (60.2 mi) long.

== Geography ==
The Ciron rises in the eastern end of the Moors of Gascony, in Landes. It flows north-west, mainly through the moors of Gironde, crosses the Sauternes vineyard and joins the Garonne at Barsac, downstream from Langon.

The moisture it brings, and morning mists it causes, are favorable to the development of Botrytis cinerea on grapes, a fungus that contributes to the high quality and renown of Sauternes wines.

== Départements and towns ==
The Ciron flows through the following départements and towns:

- Landes (40) : Lubbon
- Lot-et-Garonne (47)
- Gironde (33) : Noaillan, Villandraut, Barsac, Cérons, Bommes

== Tributaries ==
- (L) le Giscos, from Giscos
- (R) le Barthos,
- (L) la Gouaneyre, from Captieux
- (R) la Clède, from Lignan-de-Bazas
- (L) le Baillon, downstream from Villandraut
- (L) la Hure, from Saint-Symphorien
  - (L) l'Origne from Origne and Balizac
- (L) le Tursan, from Guillos
- (L) la Mouliasse, from Landiras

N.B. : (R) = right tributary; (L) = left tributary
