= Château Doisy Daëne =

French wine producer

Coordinates: 44.59164°N 0.33079°W

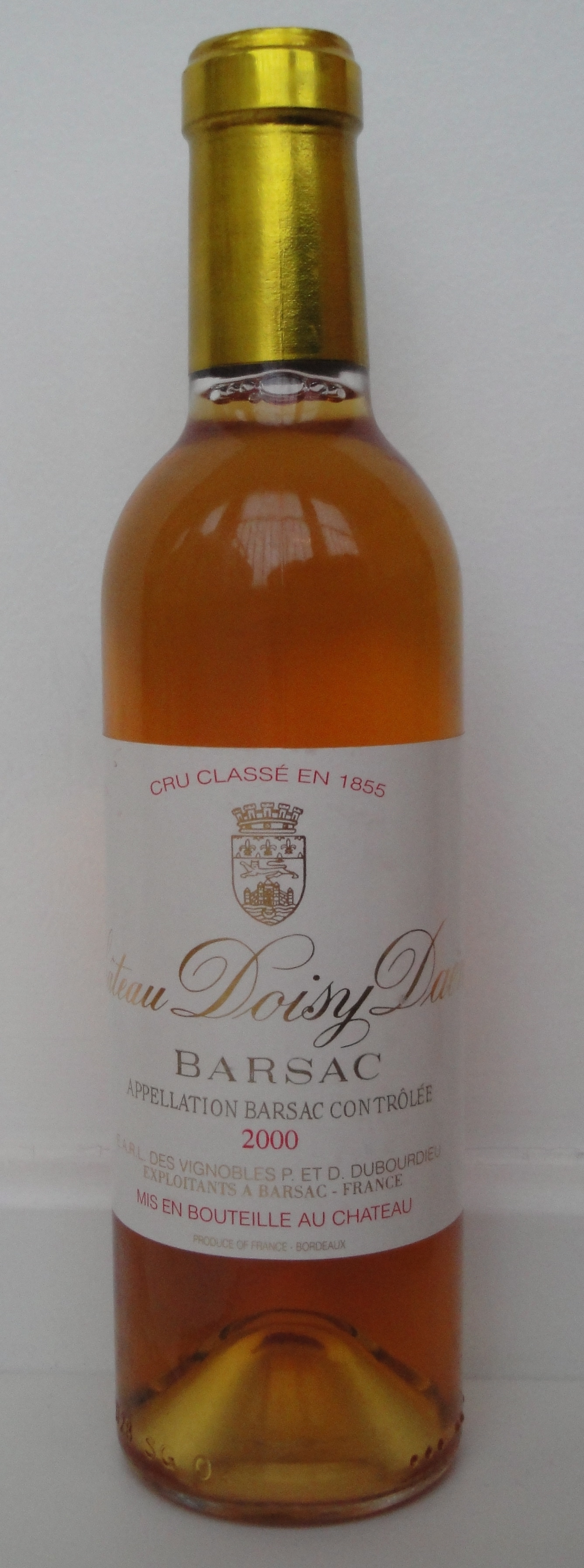
A half bottle of 2000 Château Doisy Daëne

Château Doisy Daëne is Bordeaux wine producer located in the commune of Barsac. Its sweet white wine ranked as Second Cru Classé (French, “Second Growth”) in the original Bordeaux Wine Official Classification of 1855. It belongs to the Sauternes appellation in Gironde, in the region of Graves.

== History ==
The three Doisy wine estates, Château Doisy Daëne, Château Doisy-Védrines, Château Doisy-Dubroca, originate from one single estate, the early history and division of which is not very well documented. The earliest documented mention of the Doisy wine cru is in André Julliens book Topographie de tous les vignobles connus in 1832. The Daëne part of the name comes from Jean Jacques Emmanuel Daëne, who was the vineyard owner and a wine merchant in Bordeaux, and who at some stage bought one of three portions of the estate. J.J.E. Daëne's three sons inherited the wine estate in 1875, and in the same year they sold a portion of it the Dubroca brothers of Doisy-Dubroca. In 1878 Doisy Daëne was sold to Jean Paul Billot, and his daughter Pauline inherited it in 1884, and sold it to the Debans brothers in 1889.

From 1924 Château Doisy Daëne has been owned by the Dubourdieu family. Georges Dubourdieu acquired it from the Debans heirs in 1924. Georges stayed in control until 1949, when his son Pierre Dubourdieu took over. One of Pierre Dubourdieu's innovations, in the early 1950s, was to start also making a dry white wine, the first in the Sauternes area. In 2000, Pierre's son Denis Dubourdieu took over the control estate. In 1990 and as a result of an experiment, Denis had introduced l'Extravagant de Doisy Daëne, a concentrated wine of higher sweetness than usual Sauternes, produced from highly botrytised grapes

== Vineyards ==
Doisy Daëne has 18.2 hectares (45 acres) of vineyards, planted with 86% Sémillon and 14% Sauvignon blanc. Until the 2008 vintage, there was also a small amount of Muscadelle in the vineyards.

== Wines ==
Doisy Daëne produces three wines:

- Château Doisy Daëne, its sweet Sauternes wine, in composition close to the average of the estate's vineyards;
- Grand Vin Sec du Château Doisy Daëne, a dry Bordeaux Blanc from 100% Sauvignon blanc and aged 8 months in oak barrels of which 20% new oak;
- L'Extravagant de Doisy Daëne, an extra sweet Sauternes produced in some vintages. 45% to 80% Sémillon and 20% to 55% Sauvignon blanc depending on the vintage.
