= Ernest Singer =

Wine importer and winemaker

- Born: United States
- Occupations: Winemaker and wine importer
- Known for: Promoting the use of the Koshu grape in Japanese wines

Ernest Singer is a winemaker in Japan known for promoting the use of the Koshu grape in Japanese wines. He produced the first Japanese wine approved for import into the EU.

== Biography ==
Singer was born in the United States and came to Japan at age 12 with his parents, who were in the U.S. military. His father was a computer engineer. Singer returned briefly to the United States to attend Yale.

Over the years he was involved in a variety of businesses including real estate, travel, promotion and computers. He became interested in the wine business, and started Millesimes, a wine importer. He hired Denis Dubourdieu, professor of oenology at the University of Bordeaux to help him make his own wine using the Japanese Koshu grape. He involved other Japanese winemakers in this effort as well, creating a new interest in Koshu. He incorporated his winemaking enterprise as Asagiri Wine Company and was able to get the EU to accept the first Japanese wine for import. The winery was later renamed to Fujisan Winery. (Note: "Asagiri" means "morning fog" in Japanese, while "Fujisan" means "Mount Fuji". The winery is located on the Asagiri Plateau near Mount Fuji.)

== Winemaking ==
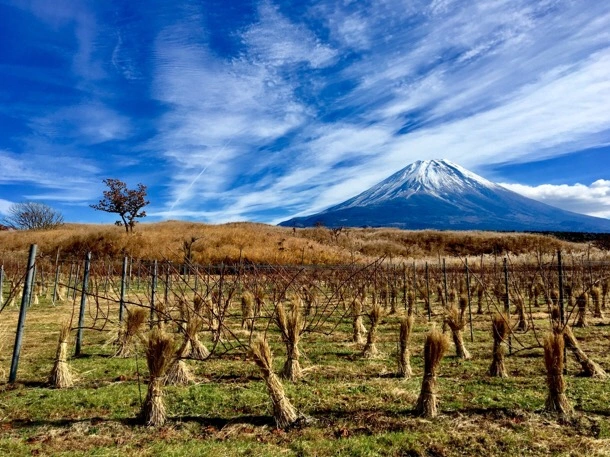
Koshu grapes growing in a vineyard near Mount Fuji

=== Koshu grape ===
Singer chose to focus on the Koshu grape because he felt it would produce wines that would complement Japanese cuisine. Koshu is a white grape that is thought to have been brought to Japan over the Silk Road from Europe centuries ago. DNA testing suggests that it is a hybrid of Vitis vinifera, a European wine grape species.

The popularity of Koshu had been declining over the years, with the area under cultivation in Yamanashi Prefecture declining by over 50% and reaching a low in 2010. After that, cultivation again began to increase. Because of Koshu's growing international recognition, Yamanashi was able to use Koshu to achieve the highest Japanese wine production of any prefecture. Yamanashi has worked to increase the land under cultivation and set a target for the production of 1,000 tons of Koshu in 2025.

=== Joint project with other Japanese winemakers ===
In the past Koshu wines produced in Japan were quite sweet, but Singer was inspired by an experimental dry Koshu wine he tasted. He decided to concentrate on dry Koshu and convinced other Japanese winemakers such as Shigekazu Misawa at Grace Wine that this was the best way to make quality wines suitable for export. They exchanged ideas and many companies became involved. Some of these banded together as the Koshu of Japan organization.

=== Winemaking with Denis Dubourdieu ===
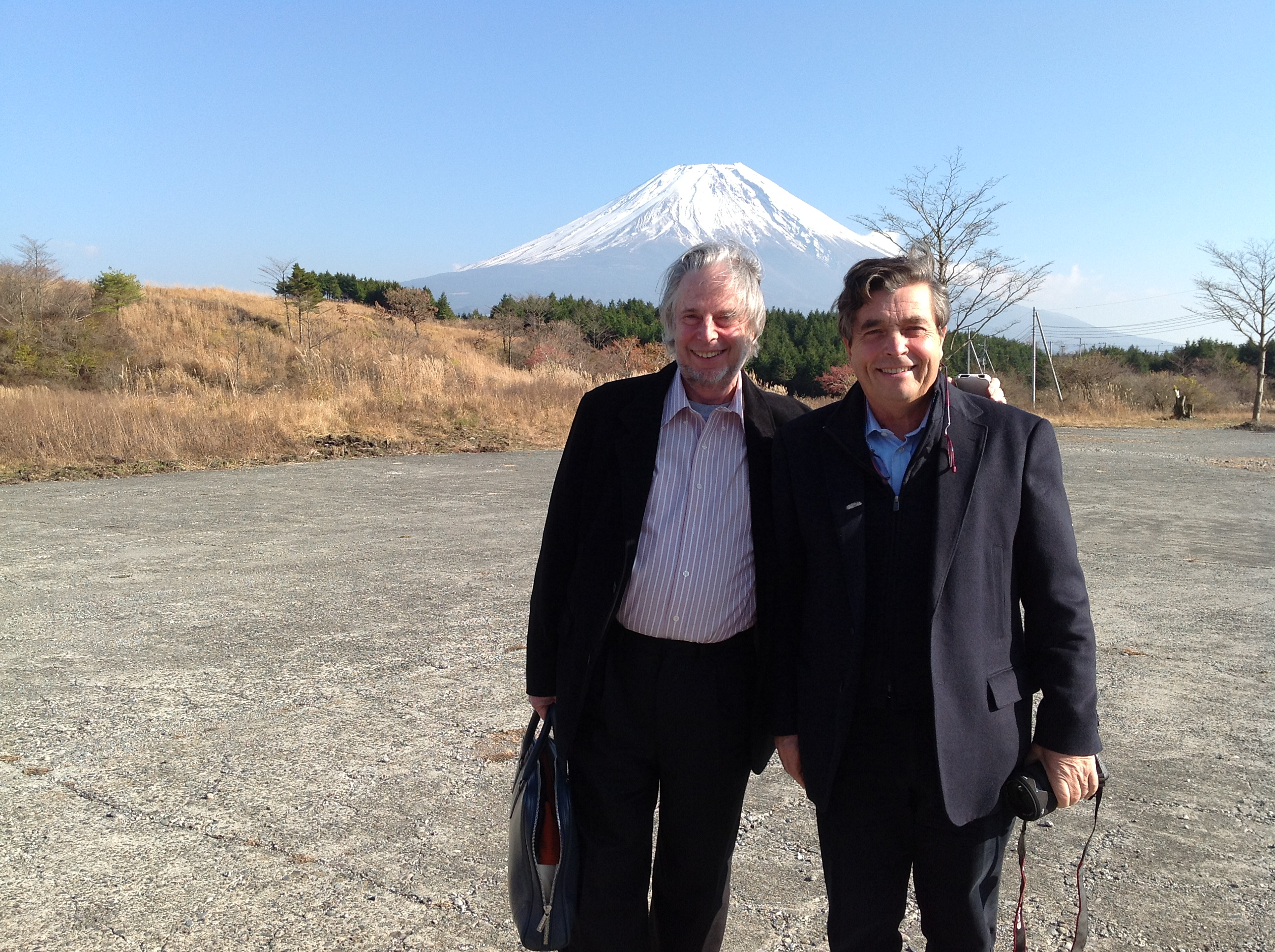
Denis Dubourdieu (right) in front of the winery with founder Ernest Singer.

Singer hired Dubourdieu to oversee the creation of a very dry Koshu, unlike the sweet Koshu wines that were prevalent at the time. Koshu grape skins tend to be extremely bitter, so Dubourdieu decided to minimize skin contact with the wine during fermentation. Sugar levels of the Koshu were low compared to varieties grown overseas, but Dubourdieu decided not to add sugar before fermentation, leading to a wine with an unusually low alcohol level of nine or ten percent. He explained that other such wines exist and are acceptable, such as Vinho Verde from Portugal.

In 2013 they went on to create a sparkling version of Koshu. The dosage (sugar added after second fermentation) for that vintage was only 2 grams per liter.

=== Approval for import into the EU ===
Wine regulations are much stricter in the EU than in Japan. For example, in 2008 the Japanese government required that only five percent of the grapes in a wine be from Japan to qualify to be labelled as a Japanese wine., but EU regulations require that wines that are a blend of grapes from different countries be identified as such. Even so, in 2008, Singer's Koshu wine "Shizen Cuvee Denis Dubourdieu" was the first Japanese wine to be accepted by the EU for import. After that, other Koshu wines such as those made by Grace Winery in Katsunuma, Yamanashi also began to be exported.

=== Virus-free vines project ===
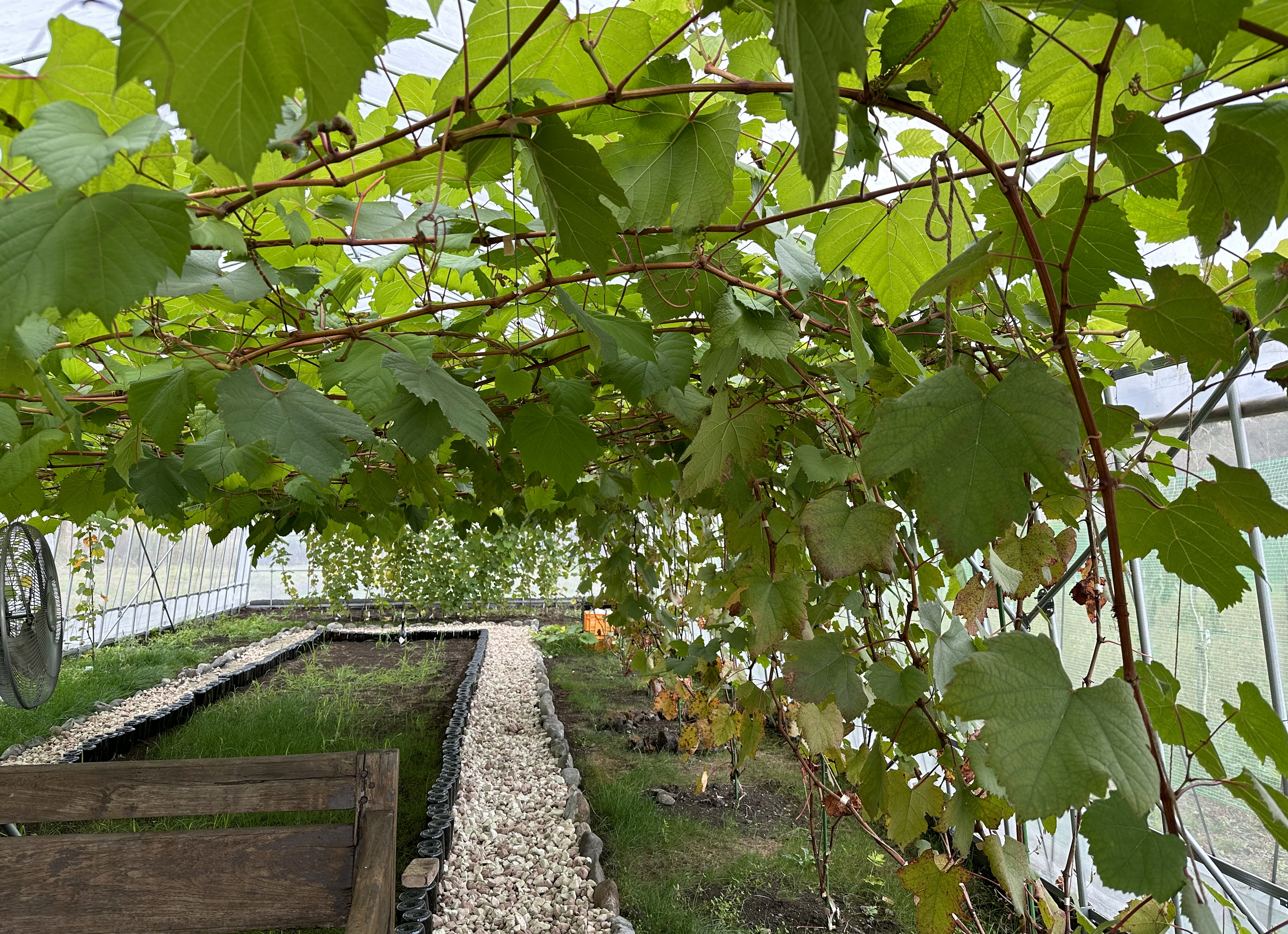
Virus-free Koshu vines produced by Chubu University being grown in a greenhouse at Fujisan Winery.

Koshu vines are commonly infected by leafroll and other viruses, reducing sugar levels and making it difficult to achieve alcohol levels higher than 9%. Producing virus-free vines would be a significant step in improving wine quality. Singer is involved in a long-term cooperative project with Chubu University to produce grape vines that are virus free. Authors from two of his companies, from Chubu University and from another university published a paper describing their process for creating virus-free vines. (Note: Millesimes and Asagiri Agriculture were both Singer's companies) Virus-free vines are grown in greenhouses at Fujisan Winery. (Note: See video's parent page on Chubu University site)

In November 2022, Fujisan Winery announced a cooperation with Golan Heights Winery in Israel to mass-produce virus-free vines.

== Personal life ==
Singer has six children from three different partnerships.
