= Jean Dubourdieu =

Jean Dubourdieu (1642?–1720) was a French Protestant minister.

== Life ==
Dubourdieu, son of Isaac Dubourdieu, was born at Montpellier in 1642 according to Agnew, in 1648 according to Haag, in 1652 according to Didot. He became one of the pastors of that town. In 1682 he published a sermon entitled 'Avis de la Sainte Vierge sur ce que tous les siècles doivent dire d'elle,’ which led to a short controversy with Jacques-Bénigne Bossuet. At the revocation of the Edict of Nantes he came to England, followed by many of his congregation, and soon afterwards attached himself as chaplain to the House of Schomberg.

He was by the side of Frederick Schomberg, 1st Duke of Schomberg at battle of the Boyne, and accompanied the duke's youngest son, Charles Schomberg, 2nd Duke of Schomberg, to Turin in 1691. Duke Charles was mortally wounded and taken prisoner by the French army under Nicolas Catinat at the battle of Marsaglia in 1693, and Dubourdieu took the body to Lausanne for interment.

Dubourdieu was one of the pastors of the French Church of the Savoy, London.

== Jean Armand Dubourdieu ==
There was a Jean Armand Dubourdieu pastor of the same church in London at the same time, who took a prominent part among the refugees, published several books, pamphlets, and sermons, was chaplain to the Duke of Devonshire, was appointed in 1701 to the rectory of Sawtrey-Moynes in Huntingdonshire, and cited in May 1713 before the Bishop of London, at the instance of the French ambassador, to answer for published attacks on Louis XIV. These two Dubourdieus, Jean and Jean Armand, were assumed by most biographers to be the same person. David Carnegie Andrew Agnew, however, in his Protestant Exiles from France, argued that they were distinct persons, Jean Armand being possibly the nephew, but more probably the son, of Jean. If 26 July 1720 was the date of Jean's death, he cannot have been Jean Armand, who preached one of his sermons in January 1723–4 (Méphiboseth, ou le caractère d'un bon sujet, London, 1724). Jean Armand Dubourdieu died in the latter part of 1726.

== Works ==
In 1695 Jean Dubourdieu published a sermon delivered on the eve of Queen Mary's funeral; and in the following year his major work, An Historical Dissertation upon the Thebean Legion; he had seen the worship given to these saints while at Turin.

A list of the books of Jean and Jean Armand Dubourdieu, given as the works of one author, is in Eugène and Émile Haag's La France Protestante.
