= Fargues, Gironde =

Fargues
- Commune
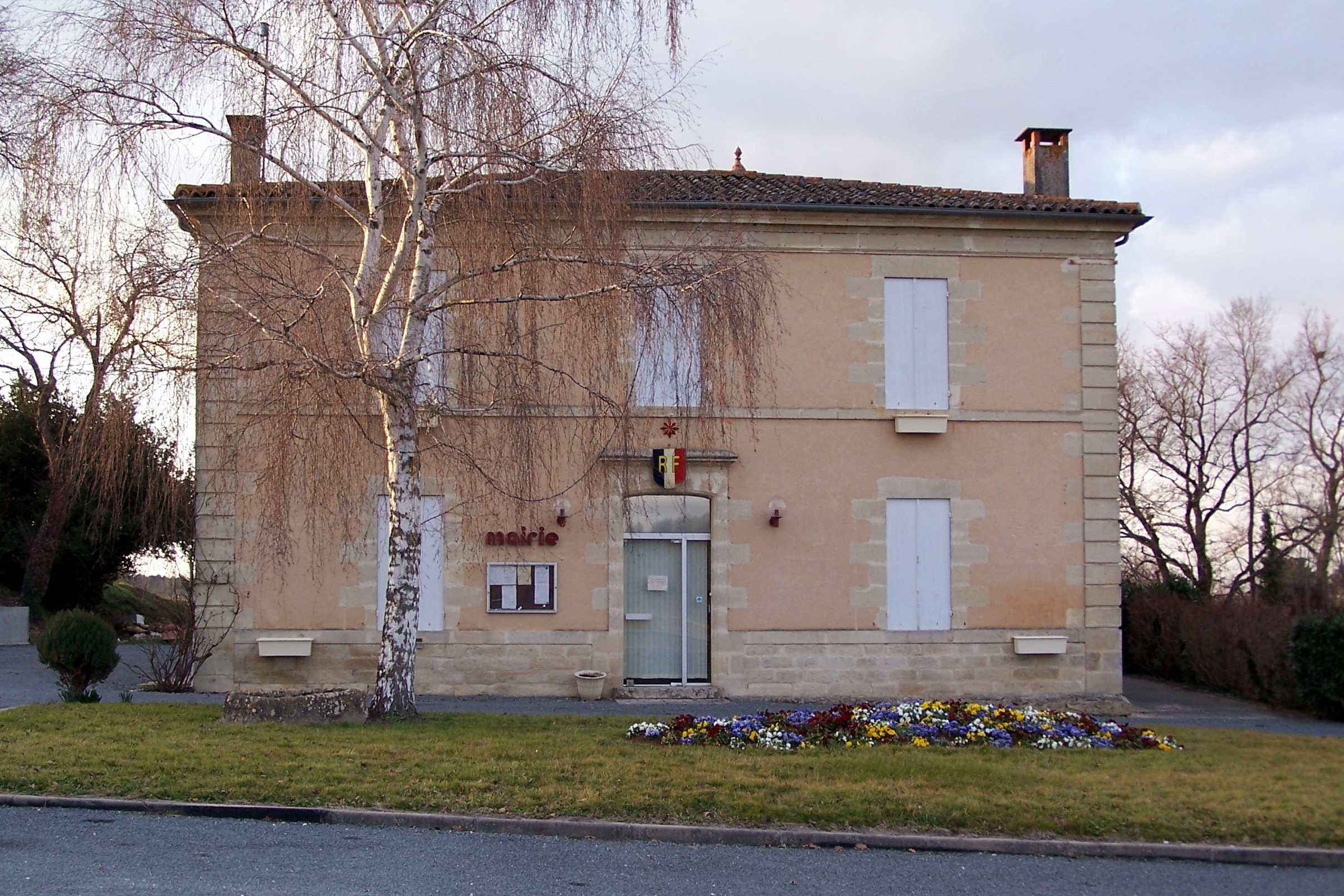
- Town hall
- Location of Fargues
- Location within France Location within Nouvelle-Aquitaine
- Coordinates: 44°32′12″N 0°17′44″W
- Country: France
- Region: Nouvelle-Aquitaine
- Department: Gironde
- Arrondissement: Langon
- Canton: Le Sud-Gironde

Government
  - Mayor (2020–2026): Robert Roncoli
- Area^{1}: 15.41 km^{2} (5.95 sq mi)
- Elevation: 40 m (130 ft)
- Highest elevation: 88 m (289 ft)
- Lowest elevation: 18 m (59 ft)
- Population (2023): 1,655
  - Density: 107.4/km^{2} (278.2/sq mi)
- Time zone: UTC+01:00 (CET)
  - Summer (DST): UTC+02:00 (CEST)
- INSEE/Postal code: 33164 /33210
- ^{1} French Land Register data, which excludes lakes, ponds, glaciers > 1 km^{2} (0.386 sq mi or 247 acres) and river estuaries.

Fargues (French pronunciation: [faʁɡ]; Occitan: Hargas de Lengon) is a commune in the Gironde department in Nouvelle-Aquitaine in southwestern France.

Fargues is located in the Sauternes wine appellation of Bordeaux.

== Population ==
Historical population
Year	Pop.	±% p.a.
1968	652	—
1975	769	+2.39%
1982	1,078	+4.94%
1990	1,185	+1.19%
1999	1,215	+0.28%
2007	1,568	+3.24%
2012	1,534	−0.44%
2017	1,652	+1.49%
2023	1,655	+0.03%
Source: INSEE

== See also ==
- Communes of the Gironde department
