= Denis Dubourdieu =

French winemaker and professor of oenology

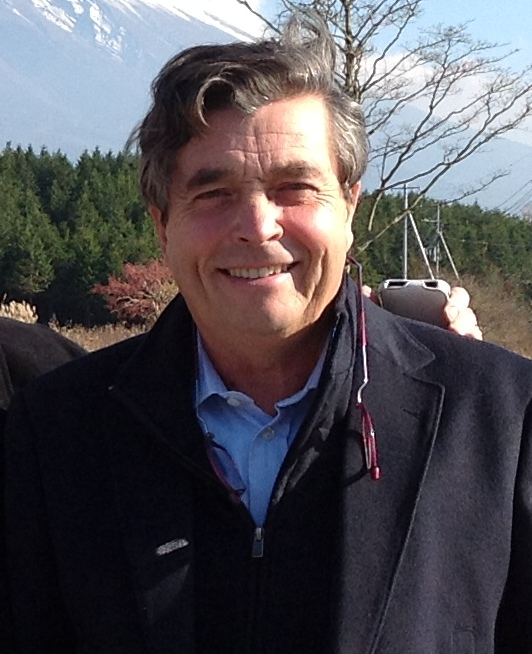
- Denis Dubourdieu in 2012
- Born: July 1, 1949; Barsac, France
- Died: July 26, 2016 (aged 67); Bordeaux, France
- Occupations: Winemaker, professor
- Spouse: Florence Dubourdieu
- Children: 2

Denis Dubourdieu (July 1, 1949 – July 26, 2016) was a French winemaker and professor of oenology at the University of Bordeaux. He managed or co-managed several properties in Bordeaux, including Château Reynon, Château Doisy Daëne, Château Cantegril, Château Haura, and Clos Floridène. He also consulted at Château Cheval Blanc and 4G Wines.

As part of his academic responsibilities, Dubourdieu was the director of l'Institut des Sciences de la Vigne et du Vin de l'Université de Bordeaux (English: Institute of Vine and Wine Sciences of the University of Bordeaux). The Institute is a multi-disciplinary research center where experts from the University of Bordeaux, l'Institut National de la Recherche Agronomique (English: The National Institute of Agronomic Research) and l'Ecole Nationale des Ingénieurs des travaux agricoles (English: The National School of Engineers of Agricultural Work) work together to assist wine producers with the state of the art in technology, technique and economic modeling.

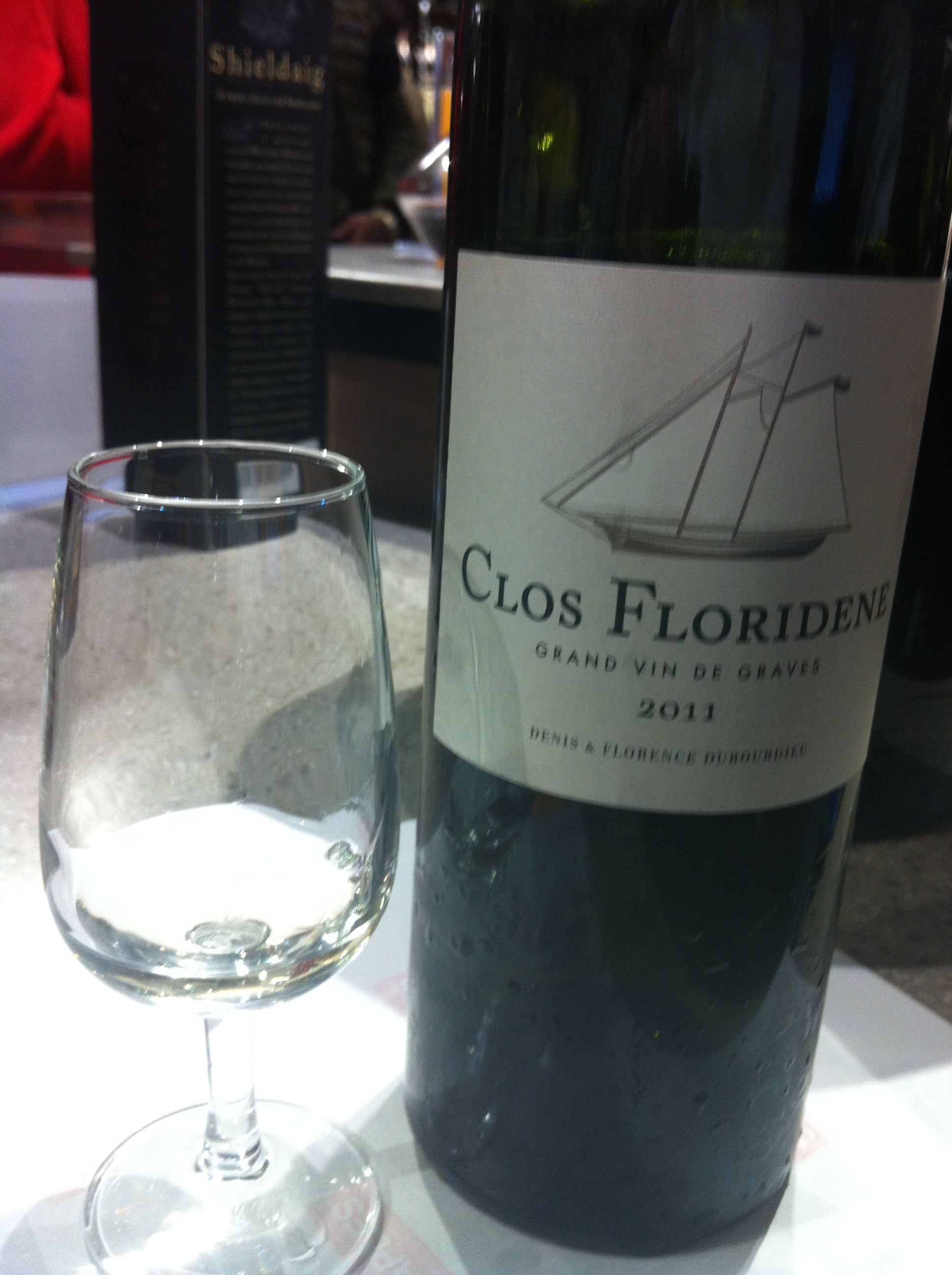
White wine from Clos Floridene the Dubourdieu family winery.

Dubourdieu specialized in winemaking processes for white wines, and has been called "wine's most famous scientist". He played a leading role in the improvement of white Bordeaux wines, which as late as the 1960s were sweet and of low quality, to become "serious, potentially profound dry whites". He was hired by Ernest Singer to oversee the creation of a dry Koshu wine. Innovations proposed by Dubourdieu include organic farming, oak barrel fermentation with extended skin contact and improved bottling techniques.

== Personal life ==
Denis was married to Florence Dubourdieu, and his sons Jean-Jacques and Fabrice both helped to run the family domaines.

His father and grandfather were winemakers, specializing in white wines. He died on 26 July 2016 in Bordeaux of brain cancer at the age of 67.
