= Isaac Dubourdieu =

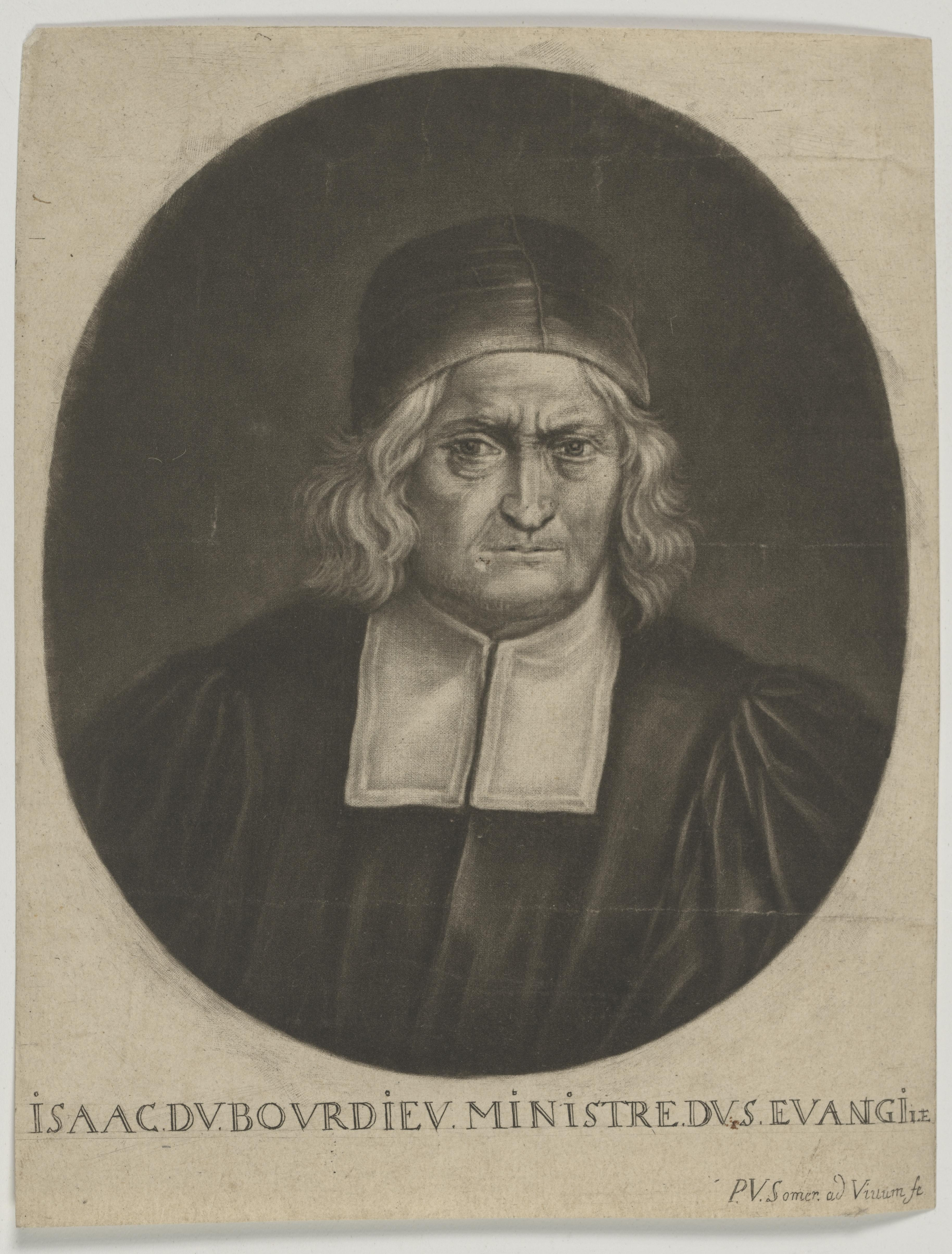

Isaac Dubourdieu (c. 1597–1700?), was a French Reformed minister. He left France for England with his two sons.

== Biography ==
Isaac Dubourdieu was a French Protestant minister at Montpellier, who was driven from that place in 1682, and took refuge in London, where he is said by a contemporary author to have "held primary rank" among his fellow pastors, and to have been "wise, laborious, and entirely devoted to the welfare of the refugee church"

In 1684 he published A Discourse of Obedience unto Kings and Magistrates, upon the Anniversary of his Majesties Birth and Restauration, and continued to preach in the Savoy Chapel, of which he was one of the ministers, at least as late as 1692. The exact dates of both his birth and death are uncertain.
