= Bommes =

- Commune
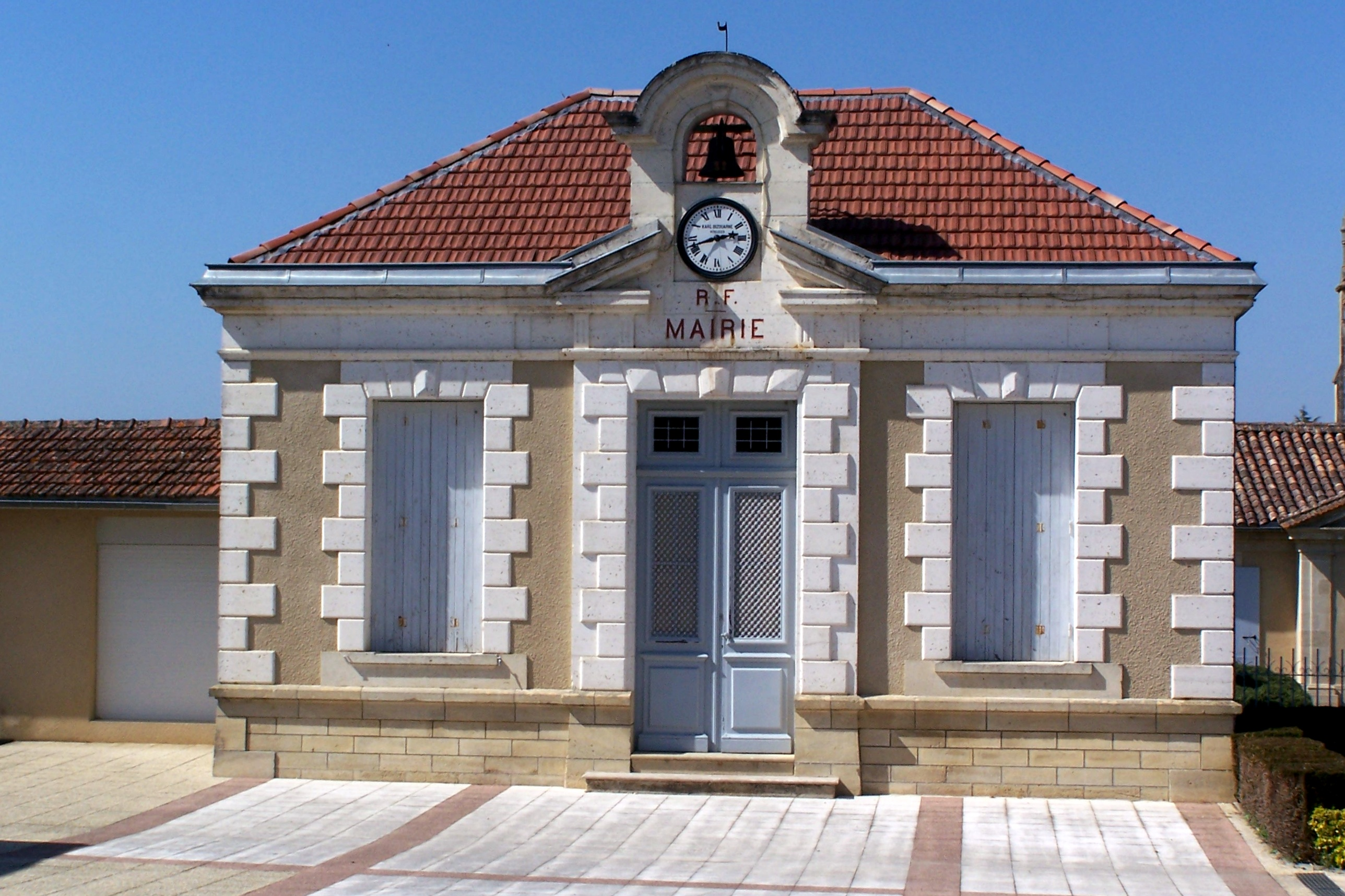
- Town hall
- Location of Bommes
- Location within France Location within Nouvelle-Aquitaine
- Coordinates: 44°32′51″N 0°21′19″W
- Country: France
- Region: Nouvelle-Aquitaine
- Department: Gironde
- Arrondissement: Langon
- Canton: Le Sud-Gironde

Government
  - Mayor (2020–2026): Bernard Laurans
- Area^{1}: 5.8 km^{2} (2.2 sq mi)
- Elevation: 65 m (213 ft)
- Highest elevation: 75 m (246 ft)
- Lowest elevation: 10 m (33 ft)
- Population (2023): 459
  - Density: 79/km^{2} (200/sq mi)
- Time zone: UTC+01:00 (CET)
  - Summer (DST): UTC+02:00 (CEST)
- INSEE/Postal code: 33060 /33210
- ^{1} French Land Register data, which excludes lakes, ponds, glaciers > 1 km^{2} (0.386 sq mi or 247 acres) and river estuaries.

Bommes (French pronunciation: [bɔm]; Occitan: Bòmas) is a commune in the Gironde department in Nouvelle-Aquitaine in southwestern France.

Bommes is located in the Sauternes wine appellation of Bordeaux.

== Population ==
Historical population
Year	Pop.	±% p.a.
1968	448	—
1975	365	−2.88%
1982	398	+1.24%
1990	446	+1.43%
1999	439	−0.18%
2007	465	+0.72%
2012	515	+2.06%
2017	465	−2.02%
2023	459	−0.22%
Source: INSEE

== See also ==
- Communes of the Gironde department
