= Second wine =

Wine not used for making top "grand vin" wine

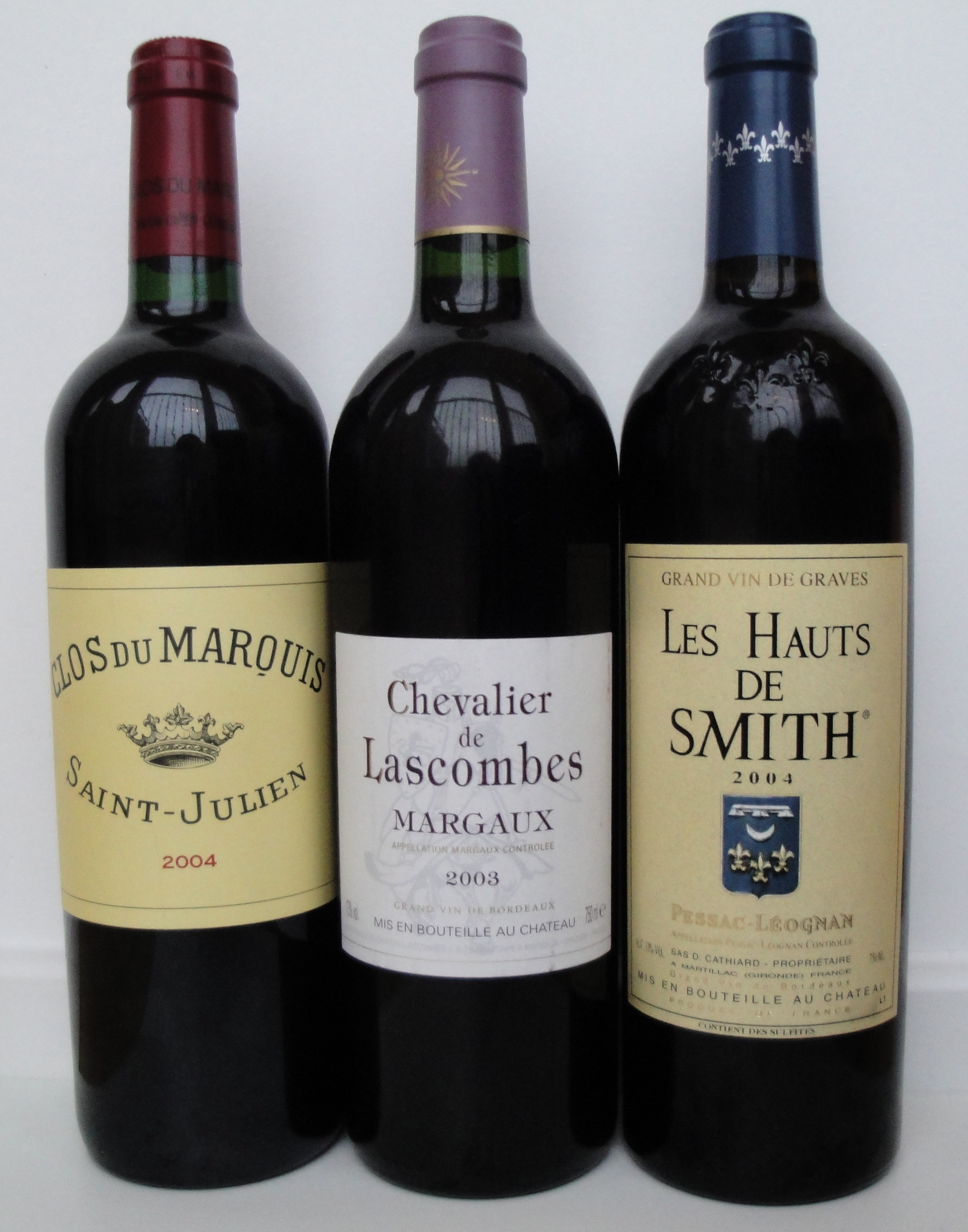
Three second wines from Bordeaux: Clos du Marquis, the second wine of Léoville-Las Cases, Chevalier de Lascombes, the second wine of Château Lascombes, and Les Hauts de Smith, the second wine of Château Smith Haut Lafitte.

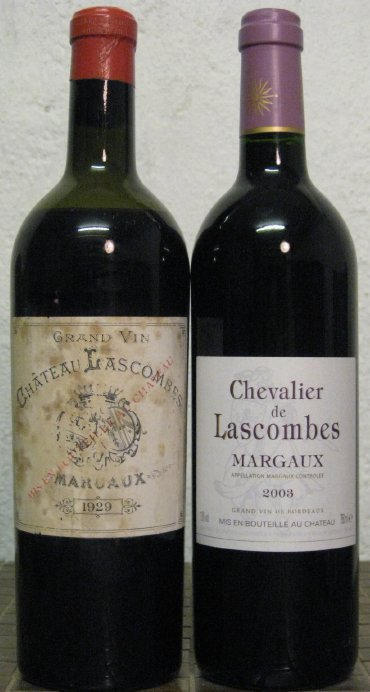
The Grand vin and Second vin of the Second Growth estate Château Lascombes; the Second vin is called Chevalier de Lascombes.

Second wine or second label (French: Second vin) is a term commonly associated with Bordeaux wine to refer to a second label wine made from cuvee not selected for use in the Grand vin or first label. In some cases a third wine or even fourth wine is also produced. Depending on the house winemaking style, individual plots of a vineyard may be selected, often those of the youngest vines, and fermented separately, with the best performing barrels being chosen for the house's top wine and the other barrels being bottled under a separate label and sold for a lower price than the Grand vin.

In less favorable vintages, an estate may choose to release only a second label wine rather than to release a smaller than normal quantity of its Grand vin or a wine that would not be consistent with past vintages under that name. The practice has its roots in the 18th century but became more commercially prominent in the 1980s when consumers discovered these wines as a more affordable way to drink the product of a First growth or classified Bordeaux estate without paying the premium for the estate's label and classification. The opposite phenomenon, of only releasing a top wine in exceptional years (rather than in most years) is seen in Iberia (Spain and Portugal) in "Gran Reserva" reserve wine and vintage port.

From the producer's point of view, a second wine allows the winery to use a stricter selection for its Grand Vin, while still capitalising on its name and distribution channels in selling the second wine, which will be much more profitable than selling off lesser wine "anonymously" to be used in e.g. negociant bulk bottlings.

== History ==
The practice of establishing a second wine began in the 18th century as way for Bordeaux winemakers to be more selective of the wine going into their estate label wine without wasting the remaining wine. According to records, Château Pichon Longueville Comtesse de Lalande shipped its "second wine" of the 1874 vintage to the 1891 Exposition française in Moscow, although La Réserve de la Comtesse would not be for sale to the public until 1973. Château Brane-Cantenac may have had a second label some time in the 18th century according to Decanter, but more evidently, Château Léoville-Las Cases first produced its Clos du Marquis in 1904, and Château Margaux followed with Pavillon Rouge produced from 1908.

Château Mouton Rothschild released the poor 1927 vintage, then named Carruades de Mouton, followed in 1930 by Mouton Cadet as a second label, selling wine from previous difficult harvests considered unfit as château Grand vin vintage at reduced prices, eventually to successful response. The estate has since expanded with more labels pushing Mouton Cadet further down its portfolio, with Le Petit Mouton de Mouton Rothschild currently the estate's second wine and Mouton Cadet evolving into its own brand with a distinctly different marketing strategy.

In the drive to higher quality that has taken place in recent decades, additional Bordeaux châteaux have added second wine. With the increased market competition since the 1980s, estates became more selective in the assemblage stage, making greater parts of the production disposed to be either sold off in bulk, or blended into second (or third) wine. For example, since the 2009 vintage, Château Margaux has produced three wines that are bottled, and a fourth wine which is sold in bulk.

Having a second wine is generally a part of the recipe prescribed by Michel Rolland and similar wine-making consultants. As an example, Château Kirwan, a Third Growth in Margaux, added their second wine Les Charmes de Kirwan in 1993, after Rolland was brought in.

== Production ==
In many ways the production of a second wine mirrors the production of estate's Grand vin being made from the same vineyard, with the same blend of grapes and by the same winemaker. Some selection takes place already after harvest, when plots that are often underperforming or are planted with younger vines will be earmarked for the second wine, which means that they receive a "cheaper" treatment with a lower percentage of new barrels. Additional selection will be done after the barrel aging when the winemaker will isolate the best performing barrels that most reflects the house style of the estate label with the remaining wine being bottled under second or even third and fourth labels.

The second wine may have some hints and characteristics of the estate wine but is typically less polished and structured than the estate wine. An estate will rarely promote its second wines and most wine labels will not even mention the parent estate because of the desire to keep the estate solely associated with its Grand vin. However, some high end producers market their second wine as a "wine for earlier consumption" (i.e., quicker to mature) rather than "a lesser wine".

== Naming and classification practices ==
Second wines often do not have the word "château" in their name, but they frequently sport some other part of their winery's name to add name recognition. The second wines of classified growths, since they are different wines, are not themselves part of the 1855 classification or other classifications. They are, however, entitled to use the same appellation as the Grand Vin, as they originate from the same terroir. As an example, Les Forts de Latour is an AOC Pauillac just like Château Latour, but is not a First Growth or any other kind of classified growth.

== List of Bordeaux second and third wines ==
=== Médoc 1855 classed growths ===
First Growth estates	Second wine	Third wine
Château Latour	Les Forts de Latour	Le Pauillac de Château Latour
Château Margaux	Pavillon Rouge de Château Margaux	Margaux de Château Margaux
Château Mouton-Rothschild	Le Petit Mouton de Mouton Rothschild	
Château Haut-Brion	Le Clarence de Haut-Brion (previously Château Bahans Haut-Brion)	
Château Lafite Rothschild	Carruades de Lafite-Rothschild	Anseillan
Second Growth estates		
Château Rauzan-Ségla	Ségla	
Château Rauzan-Gassies	Chevalier de Rauzan-Gassies (previously Enclos de Moncabon)	
Château Léoville-Las Cases	Le Petit Lion de Marquis de las Cases (replaced Clos du Marquis since 2007)	
Château Léoville-Poyferré	Pavillon de Léoville-Poyferré (previously Château Moulin Riche )	
Château Léoville Barton	La Réserve de Léoville Barton	
Château Durfort-Vivens	Vivens de Durfort-Vivens (previously Domaine de Curebourse)	
Château Gruaud-Larose	Sarget de Gruaud-Larose	
Château Lascombes	Chevalier de Lascombes	Château Segonnes
Château Brane-Cantenac	Baron de Brane	
Château Pichon Longueville Baron	Les Tourelles de Longueville(formally known as Baronet de Pichon) and Les Griffons de Pichon Baron	
Château Pichon Longueville Comtesse de Lalande	Reserve de la Comtesse	
Château Ducru-Beaucaillou	La Croix de Beaucaillou	Le Petit Ducru de Ducru-Beaucaillou
Château Cos d'Estournel	Les Pagodes de Cos	
Château Montrose	La Dame de Montrose	Le St-Estèphe de Montrose
Third Growth estates		
Château Kirwan	Les Charmes de Kirwan	
Château d'Issan	Blason d'Issan	
Château Lagrange	Les Fiefs de Lagrange	
Château Langoa Barton	Lady Langoa	
Château Giscours	La Sirène de Giscours	
Château Malescot St. Exupéry	La Dame de Malescot	
Château Cantenac-Brown	Brio de Cantenac-Brown	
Château Boyd-Cantenac	Jacques Boyd	
Château Palmer	Alter Ego de Palmer (replaced Réserve du Général in 1998)	
Château La Lagune	Moulin de la Lagune	
Château Desmirail	Initial de Desmirail	
Château Calon-Ségur	Le Marquis de Calon-Ségur	
Château Ferrière	Les Remparts de Ferrière	
Château Marquis d'Alesme Becker	Marquise d'Alesme	
Fourth Growth estates		
Château Talbot	Connétable de Talbot	
Château Branaire-Ducru	Duluc de Branaire-Ducru	
Château Duhart-Milon-Rothschild	Moulin de Duhart	
Château Pouget	Antoine Pouget	
Château La Tour Carnet	Les Douves de Carnet	
Château Lafon-Rochet	Les Pélerins de Lafon-Rochet	
Château Beychevelle	Amiral de Beychevelle	
Château Prieuré-Lichine	Confidance de Prieuré-Lichine	
Château Marquis de Terme	Les Gondats de Marquis de Terme	
Château Saint-Pierre	Esprit de Saint-Pierre	
Fifth Growth estates		
Château Pontet-Canet	Les Hauts de Pontet-Canet	
Château Haut-Batailley	Verso (formerly known as Château La Tour l'Aspic)	
Château Grand-Puy-Lacoste	Lacoste-Borie	
Château Grand-Puy-Ducasse	Prélude à Grand-Puy Ducasse	
Château Lynch-Bages	Echo de Lynch-Bages	Pauillac de Lynch-Bages
Château du Tertre	Les Hauts du Tertre	
Château Dauzac	Aurore de Dauzac and La Bastide de Dauzac	Château Labarde
Château Haut-Bages-Libéral	La Chapelle de Bages	
Château Pédesclaux	Fleur de Pédesclaux	Le Haut-Médoc de Pédesclaux
Château Belgrave	Diane de Belgrave	
Château de Camensac	La Closerie de Camensac	
Château Cos Labory	Le Charme Labory	
Château Croizet Bages	La Tourelle de Croizet-Bages	
Château Cantemerle	Les Allées de Cantemerle	Baronne Caroline
Château Clerc Milon	Pastourelle de Clerc Milon	
Château Batailley	Lions de Batailley	
Château Lynch-Moussas	Les Hauts de Lynch-Moussas	

=== Sauternes 1855 classed growths ===
First Growth estates	Second wine
Château La Tour Blanche	Les Charmilles de Tour Blanche
Château Lafaurie-Peyraguey	La Chapelle de Lafaurie-Peyraguey
Château Clos Haut-Peyraguey	La Gourmandise de Clos Haut-Peyraguey
Château de Rayne-Vigneau	Madame de Rayne
Château Suduiraut	Castelnau de Suduiraut
Château Coutet	Chartreuse de Coutet
Château Climens	Cyprès de Climens
Château Guiraud	Petit Guiraud
Château Rieussec	Carmes de Rieussec (previously Clos la Bere)
Château Sigalas-Rabaud	Lieutenant de Sigalas
Second Growth estates	
Château Doisy-Dubroca	La Demoiselle de Doisy
Château Doisy-Védrines	Château Petit Védrines
Château d'Arche	Prieuré d'Arche
Château Nairac	Esquisse de Nairac
Château Caillou	Les Erables de Caillou
Château de Malle	Saint-Hélène
Château Romer du Hayot	Château Andoyse du Hayot
Château Lamothe	Les Tourelles de Lamothe
Château Lamothe-Guignard	L'ouest de Lamothe-Guignard

=== Other Bordeaux ===
Graves classed estates	Second wine	Third wine
Château Bouscaut	Les Chênes de Bouscaut	
Château Carbonnieux	La Croix de Carbonnieux, Château Tour Léognan	
Domaine de Chevalier	L'Espirit de Chevalier	
Château Couhins	Couhins La Gravette	
Château de Fieuzal	L'Abeille de Fieuzal	
Château Haut-Bailly	Haut-Bailly II	HB
Château Latour-Martillac	Lagrave-Martillac	
Château Malartic-Lagravière	La Reserve de Malartic	
Château La Mission Haut-Brion	La Chapelle de la Mission	
Château Olivier	La Seigneurie d'Olivier du Chateau Olivier	
Château Pape Clément	Le Clémentin du Pape Clément	
Château Smith Haut Lafitte	Les Hauts de Smith	
Saint-Émilion classed estates		
Château Ausone	Chapelle d'Ausone	
Château Cheval Blanc	Le Petit Cheval	
Château Angélus	Carillon de L'Angélus	No. 3 d'Angélus
Château Pavie	Aromes de Pavie	
Château Beauséjour	Croix de Beauséjour	
Château Beau-Séjour Bécot	Tournelle de Beau-Séjour Bécot	
Château Canon	Clos de Canon	
Château Figeac	Petit Figeac	
Clos Fourtet	Closerie de Fourtet	
Château Larcis Ducasse	Murmure de Larcis Ducasse	
Château La Fleur Morange	Mathilde	
Château La Gaffelière	Clos La Gaffelière	
Château Magdelaine	Les Songes de Magdelaine (previously Château Saint Brice)	
Château Pavie-Macquin	Les Chênes de Macquin	
Château La Tour Figeac	L'Esquisse de La Tour Figeac	
Château Troplong Mondot	Mondot	
Château Trotte Vieille	La Vieille Dame de Trotte Vieille	
Château Canon-la-Gaffelière	Côte Mignon La Gaffelière	
Château Grand Corbin-Despagne	Petit Corbin-Despagne	
Médoc Cru Bourgeois		
Château d'Arsac	Kid d'Arsac	
Château Chasse-Spleen	L'Héritage de Chasse-Spleen and L'Oratoire de Chasse-Spleen	
Château Haut-Marbuzet	Château MacCarthy	
Château Labégorce Zédé	Domaine Zédé and Z de Zédé	
Château Phélan Ségur	Franck Phélan	
Château Potensac	La Chapelle de Potensac (previously Château Lassalle)	
Château Poujeaux	La Salle de Poujeaux	
Château Citran	Moulins de Citran	
Unclassified estates		
Château Beauregard	Le Benjamin de Beauregard (previously Domaine des Douves)	
Château La Conseillante	Duo de Conseillante	
Château L'Évangile	Blason de L'Évangile	
Château Gazin	l'Hospitalet de Gazin	
Château Gloria	Château Peymartin	
Château Lafleur	Les Pensées de Lafleur	
Château Mazeyres	Le Seuil de Mazeyres	
Château Nénin	Fugue de Nénin	
Château Petit-Village	Le Jardin de Petit Village	
Château Rouget	Vieux Château des Templiers	
Château Sociando-Mallet	La Demoiselle de Sociando-Mallet	
Château Trotanoy	Espérance de Trotanoy	
Château Valandraud	Virginie de Valandraud and 3 de Valandraud	
Vieux Château Certan	Gravette de Certan	
Château l'Église Clinet	La Petite Eglise	

== List of non-Bordeaux second and third wines ==
=== California ===
Winery	First wine	Second wine
Opus One Winery	Opus One	Overture
Dominus Estate	Dominus	Napanook
Screaming Eagle	Screaming Eagle	The Flight
Harlan Estate	Harlan Estate	The Maiden
Grace Family	Grace Family	Blank
Scarecrow	Scarecrow	M. Etain

=== Italy ===
Winery	First wine	Second wine	Third wine
Ornellaia (Tenuta dell'Ornellaia)	Ornellaia	Le Serre Nuove	Le Volte
Masseto (Tenuta dell'Ornellaia)	Masseto	Massetino	
Tenuta San Guido	Sassicaia	Guidalberto	Le Difese
Tenuta Luce della Vite	Luce	Lucente	

=== Spain ===
Winery	First Wine	Second wine	Third wine
Vega Sicilia	Unico	Valbuena 5o	
Alvaro Palacios	L'Ermita	Finca Dofi	Les Terrasses
Marques de Murrieta	Castillo Ygay	Marques de Murrieta Gran Reserva	Marques de Murrieta Reserva
Bodegas Numanthia	Termanthia	Numanthia	Termes
Bodegas Contador	Contador	La cueva del contador	Predicador
Dominio de Pingus	Pingus	Flor de Pingus	PSI

== See also ==
- Reserve wine (Gran Reserva)
- Vintage port
