= Château Les Ormes-de-Pez =

Winery in the Bordeaux region of France

Château Les Ormes-de-Pez, or Château Ormes de Pez, (French for The Elms of Pez) is a winery in the Saint-Estèphe appellation of the Bordeaux wine region of France, near the hamlet of Pez. The wine produced here was classified as one of 9 Cru Bourgeois Exceptionnels in the 2003 listing. Though this classification is currently annulled, it is expected to be revived by the 2009 vintage, but without use of the quality divisions such as "exceptionnel".

== History ==
The Château and buildings date from 1792, constructed after the division and sale of Château de Pez as a result of the French Revolution. During the 19th century it was owned by Marcel Alibert, also the owner of Château Belgrave, until it was sold in 1927 to the Société Civile du Haut Médoc. Financial trouble forced the estate to be sold on to Jean-Charles Cazes in 1930, who passed it on to his son André Cazes.

To date the estate is owned by the Cazes family, also owners of Château Lynch-Bages. For many years the vinification took place at Lynch-Bages, but the cuvier and chai of Ormes-de-Pez were modernised before the 1981 vintage. After a long period of management by Jean-Michel Cazes, he has been succeeded by his son Jean-Charles Cazes.

== Production ==
The vineyard area, divided into two blocks north and south of the village of Saint-Estèphe, extends 33 hectares (82 acres), with the grape varieties of 70% Cabernet Sauvignon, 10% Cabernet Franc and 20% Merlot.

The annual production of the Grand vin Château Ormes de Pez is typically 15,000 cases. No second wine is produced.
