= Fourtet =

Fourtet may refer to

- Clos Fourtet, a Bordeaux Saint-Émilion wine producer
- Four Tet, the stage name of electronic musician Kieran Hebden
