= Château Siran =

French winery

Coordinates: 45.02174°N 0.63458°W

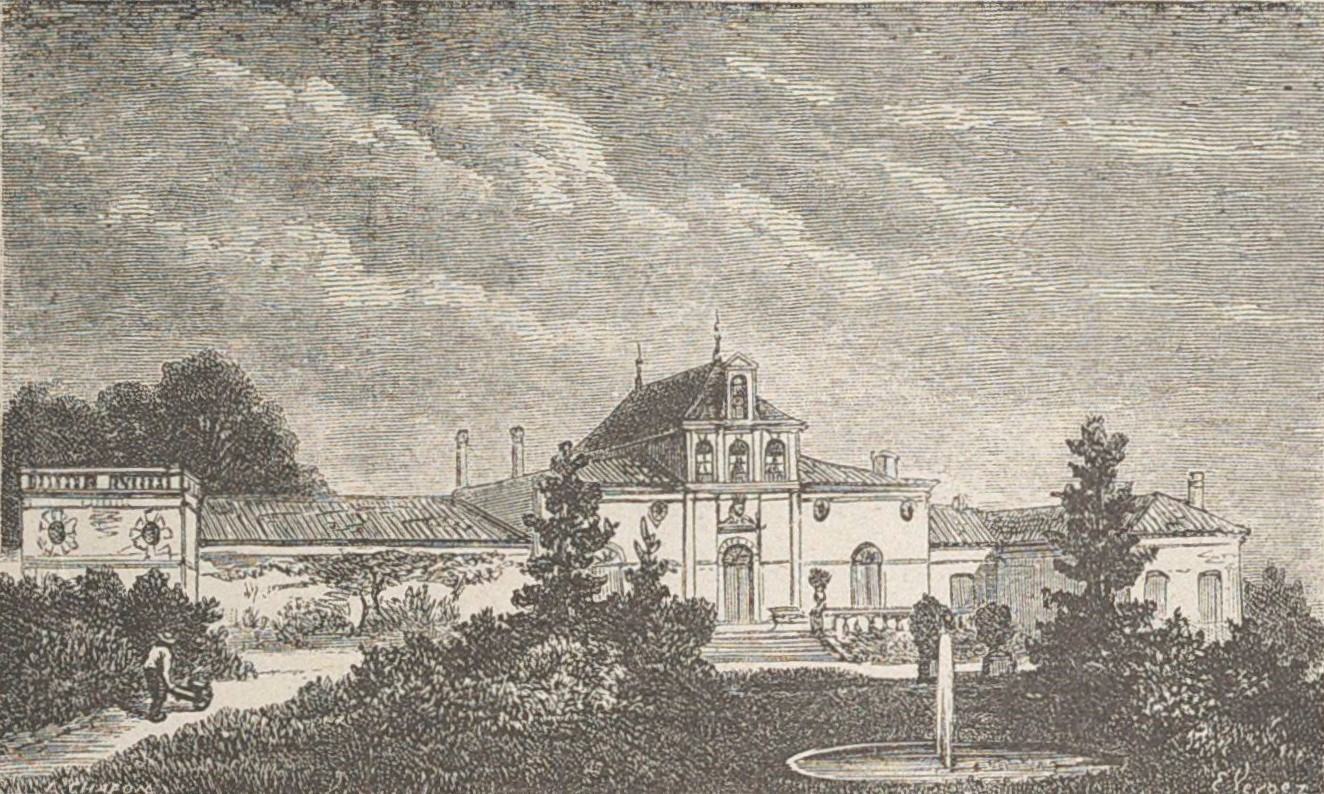
Illustration du Château Siran dans l'ouvrage Bordeaux et ses vins (11ème édition) de Charles Cocks et Edouard Féret publié en 1949.

Château Siran is a winery in the Margaux appellation of the Bordeaux region of France. The wine produced here was classified as one of 9 Cru Bourgeois Exceptionnels as of the 2003 listing. The Chateau owns 88 hectares (217 acres) including 40 (99 acres) of vines planted with Cabernet Sauvignon, Merlot, Petit Verdot, and Cabernet Franc. A second wine is produced under the label S de Siran. The average vines are 31 years old and once fermentation is complete the wines are transferred into oak barrels (35% new oak) for 12–14 months of aging. The grand vin averages 75,000 to 90,000 bottles per annum.
