= Château Poujeaux =

Wine

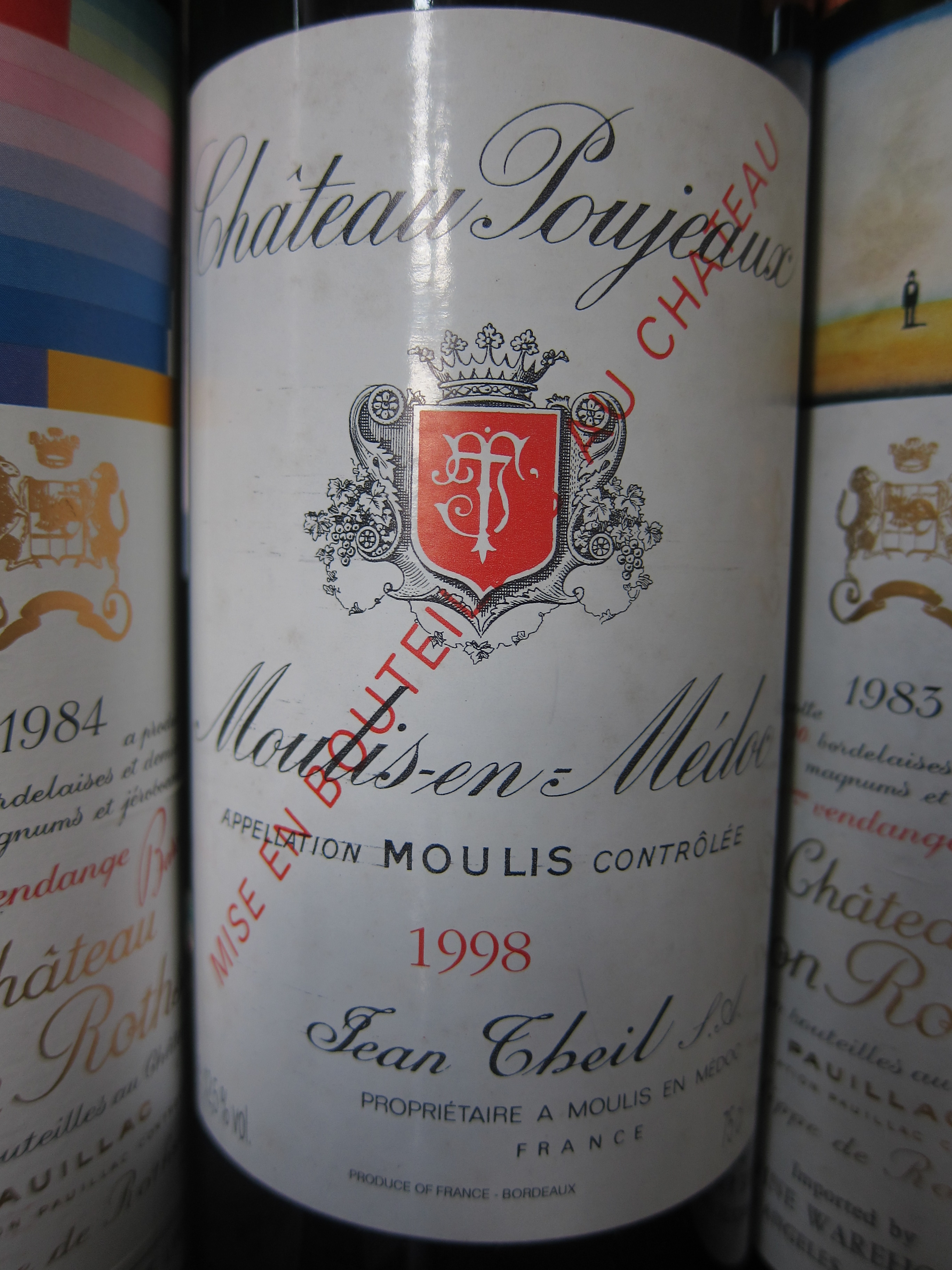
1998 Château Poujeaux.

Château Poujeaux lies in the wine-producing district of Moulis-en-Médoc in the Bordeaux region of France. It is one of the most highly regarded wines within Moulis, alongside Château Chasse-Spleen. In the 2003 classification of Cru Bourgeois wines, Château Poujeaux was one of just nine to be placed in the highest category, Cru Bourgeois Exceptionnels.

The property was owned by the Theil family until early 2008, when it was bought by Philippe Cuvelier, also owner of Clos Fourtet.

== Vineyard and wines ==
The vineyard covers 52 hectares (130 acres) and produces about 25,000 cases of wine per year. The grape varieties used are 50% Cabernet Sauvignon, 40% Merlot, 5% Cabernet Franc and 5% Petit Verdot. A second wine is produced, under the name La Salle de Poujeaux.
