= Château Cos d'Estournel =

Winery in the Bordeaux region of France

Coordinates: 45°13′52″N 0°46′34″W

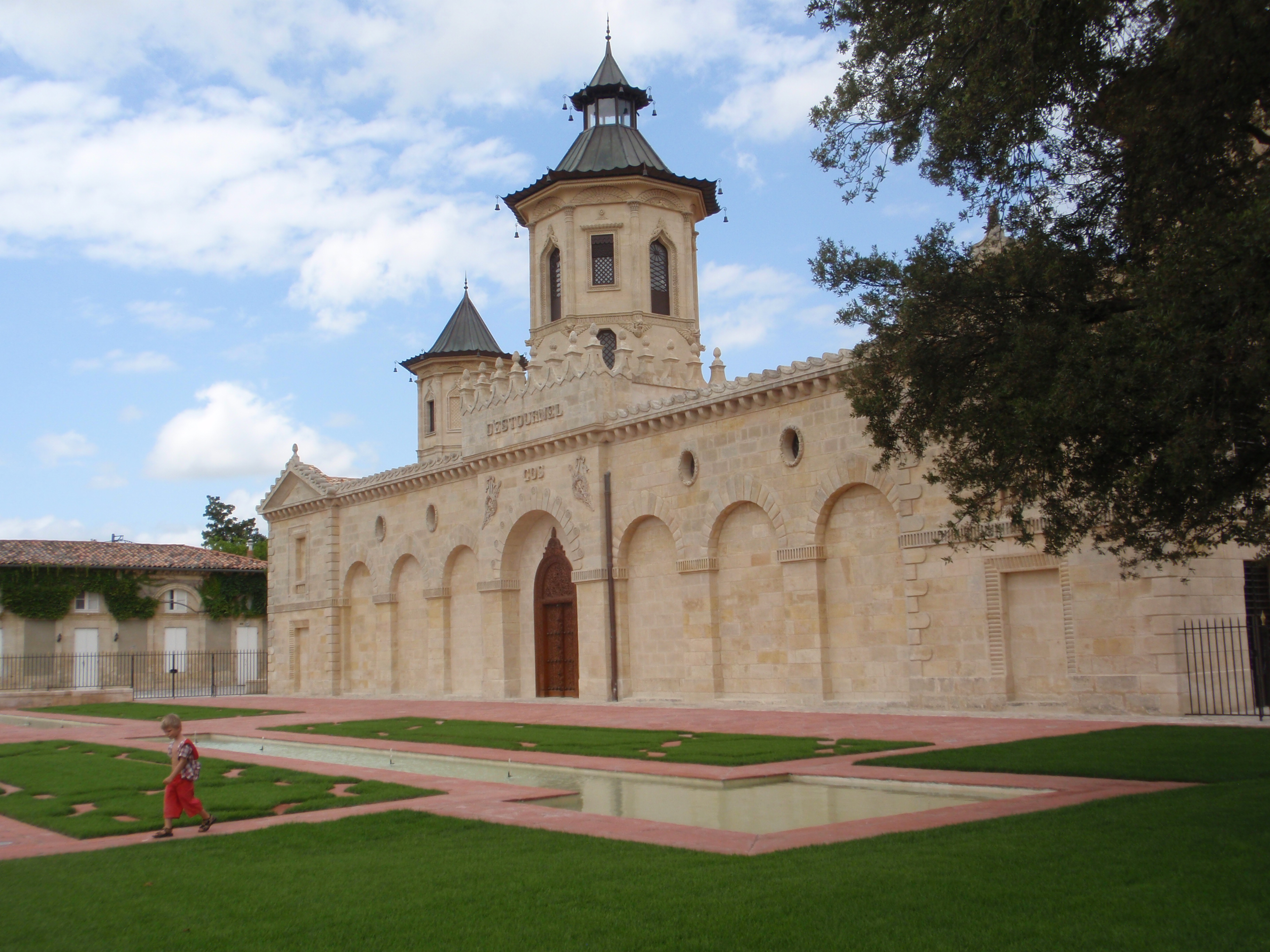
Château Cos d'Estournel

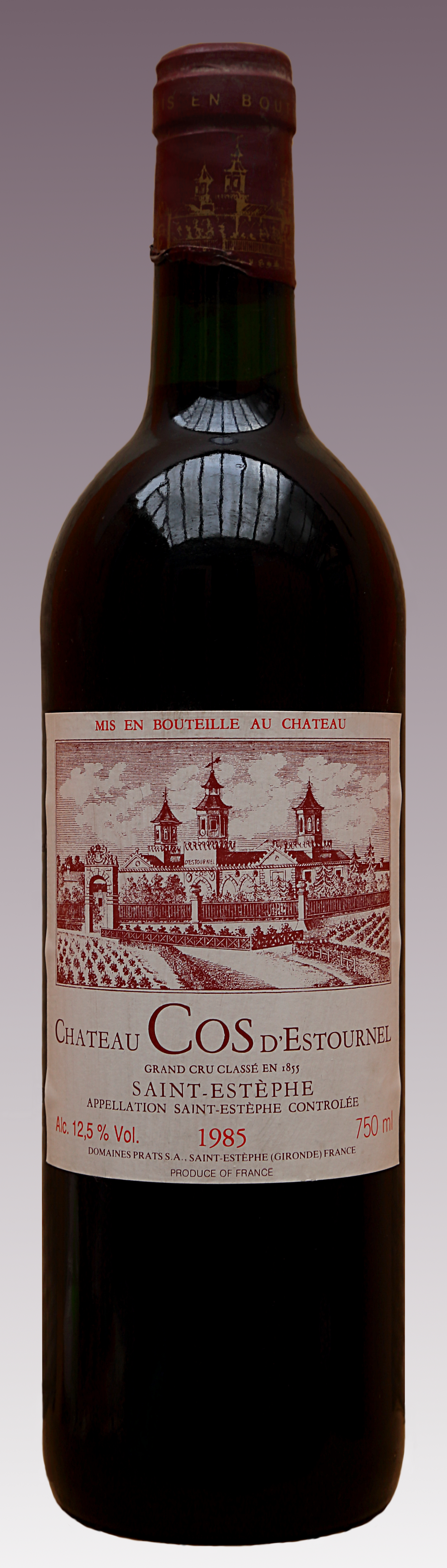
Grand Vin Label

Château Cos d'Estournel is a winery in the Saint-Estèphe appellation of the Bordeaux region of France. It is also the name of the red wine produced by this property. The wine produced here was classified as one of fifteen Deuxièmes Crus (Second Growths) in the original Bordeaux Wine Official Classification of 1855.

Château Cos d'Estournel produces the eponymous grand vin, the second wine since the 1994 vintage, Les Pagodes de Cos from the estate's younger vines, as well as Château Marbuzet from fruit of nearby plots. The property is adjacent to Château Lafite-Rothschild in the neighboring commune of Pauillac.

== History ==
The name Cos (with the S pronounced) refers to a "hill of pebbles" in Gascon dialect and the name Cos d'Estournel was given in 1810 by Louis-Gaspard d'Estournel.

The estate has changed hands several times during its history, starting in 1852 when it was purchased by the English banker Charles Cecil Martyns. In 1869, it was sold to the Spanish Errazu family only to be sold again 20 years later in 1889 to the Bordeaux-based Hostein family. Through his marriage to Marie-Thérèse Hostein, Louis-Victor Charmolue, who also owned Château Montrose, gained control of Cos d'Estournel in 1894. In 1917, it was sold to Fernand Ginestet.

The château has remained in the Ginestet family since then, becoming in 1970 part of Domaines Prats, the combined holdings of the Ginestet and Prats families, and controlled by Bruno Prats.

In June 2008 it was announced that Michel Reybier, current owner of Cos d'Estournel, purchased Napa winery Chateau Montelena for an undisclosed sum. By November 2008, however, this agreement was cancelled, the termination of the transaction by Chateau Montelena stated to be due to that Reybier Investments had been "unable to meet its obligations".

== Production ==
From a 100 hectare estate, the vineyard area extends 70 hectares (170 acres), divided into 30 parcels, primarily composed of the grape varieties of 60% Cabernet Sauvignon and 40% Merlot, with minor cultivation of Cabernet Franc and Petit verdot that appears to participate little in the modern production. The annual production is typically 32,000 cases.

Cos wines tend to have a higher blend of Merlot than other classified Left Bank wines.

== Gallery ==
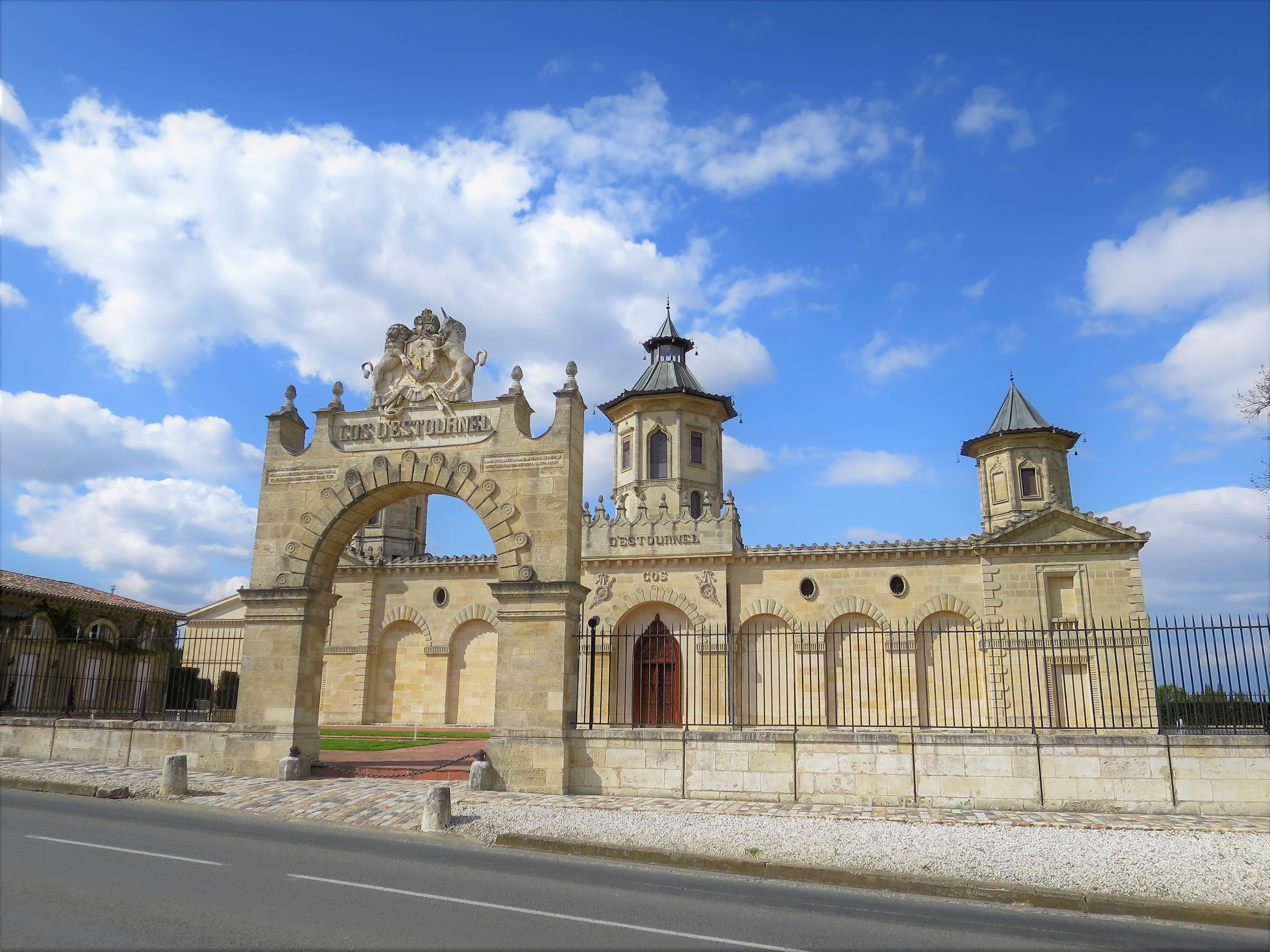

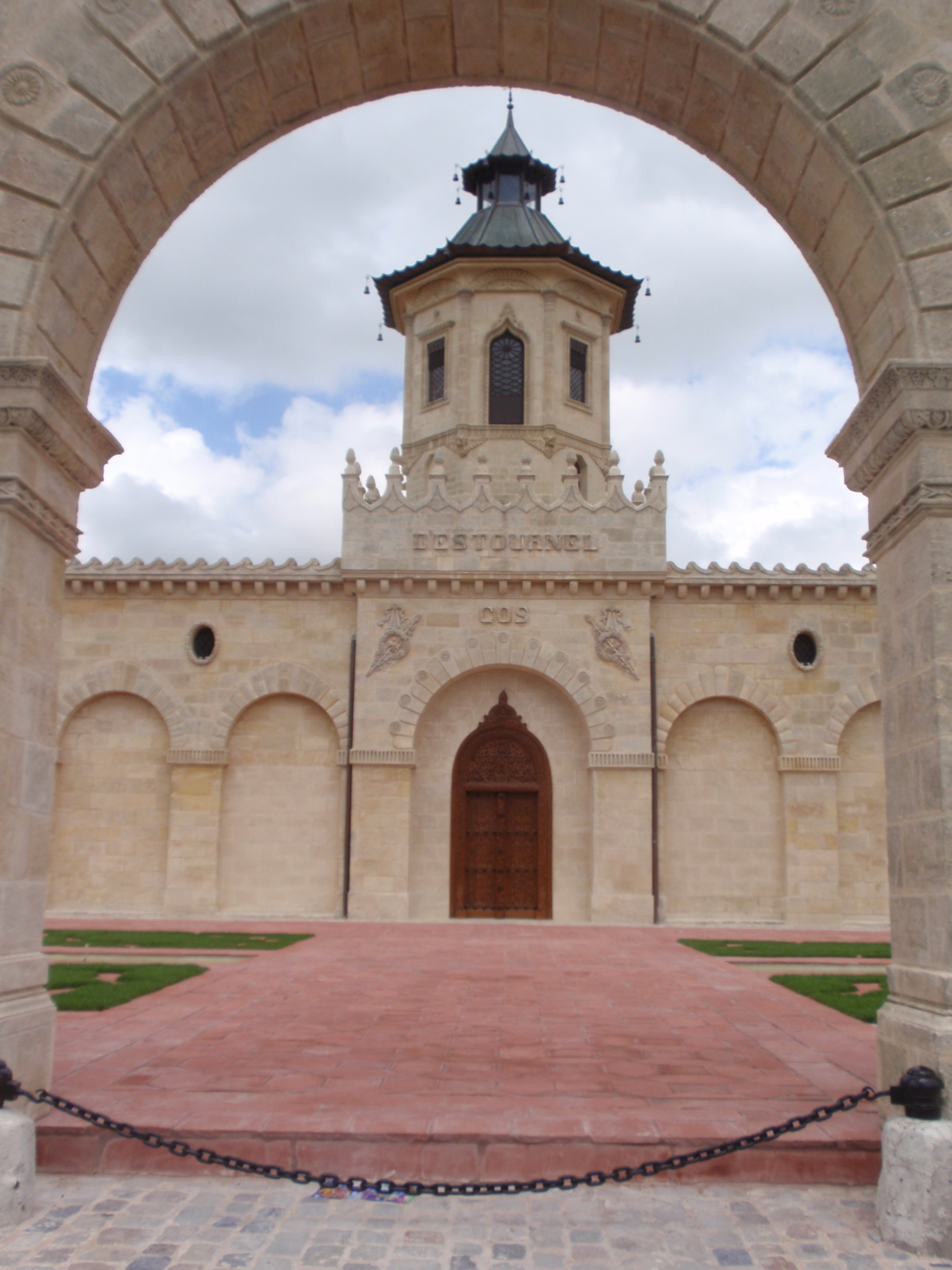

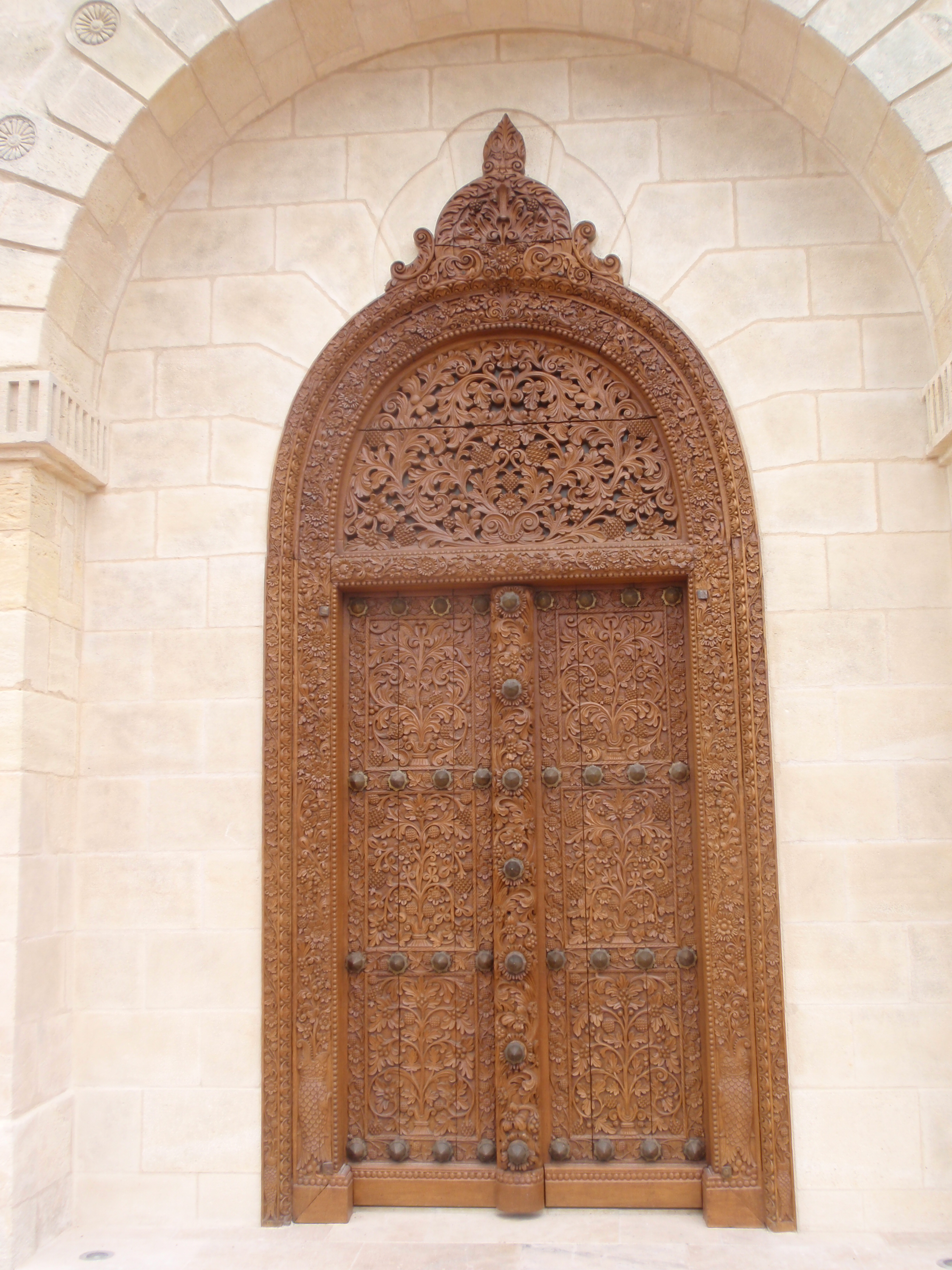

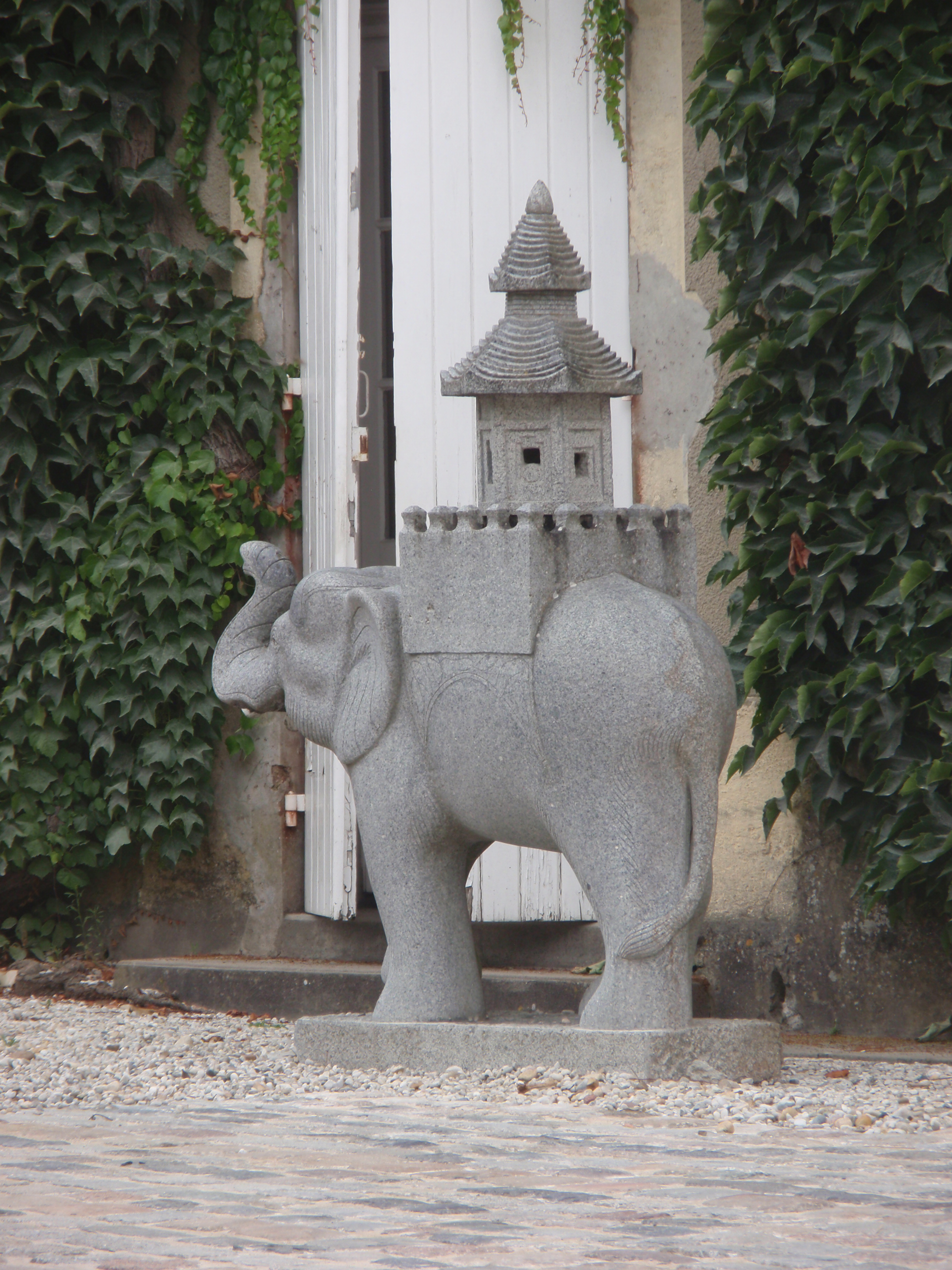

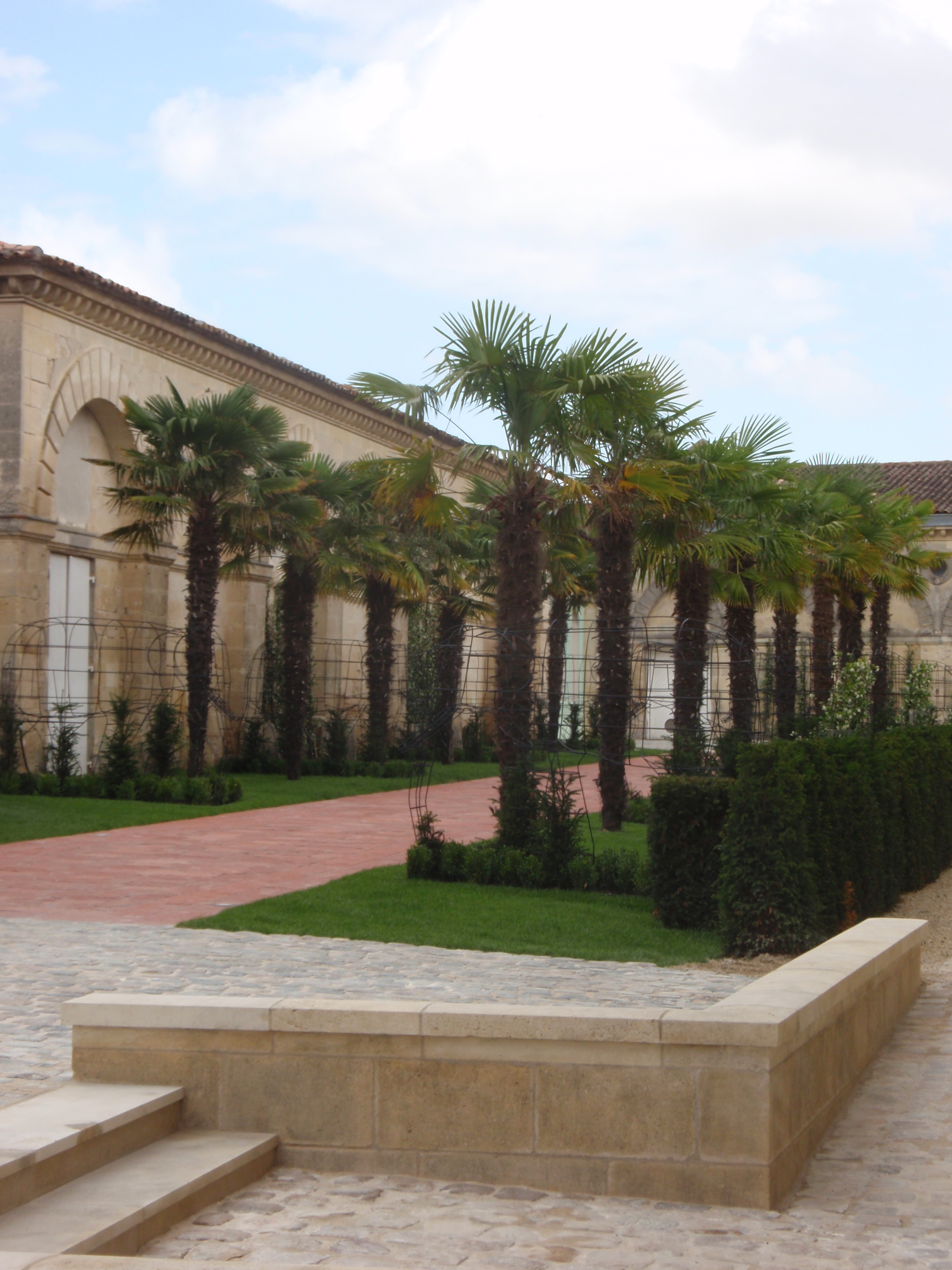

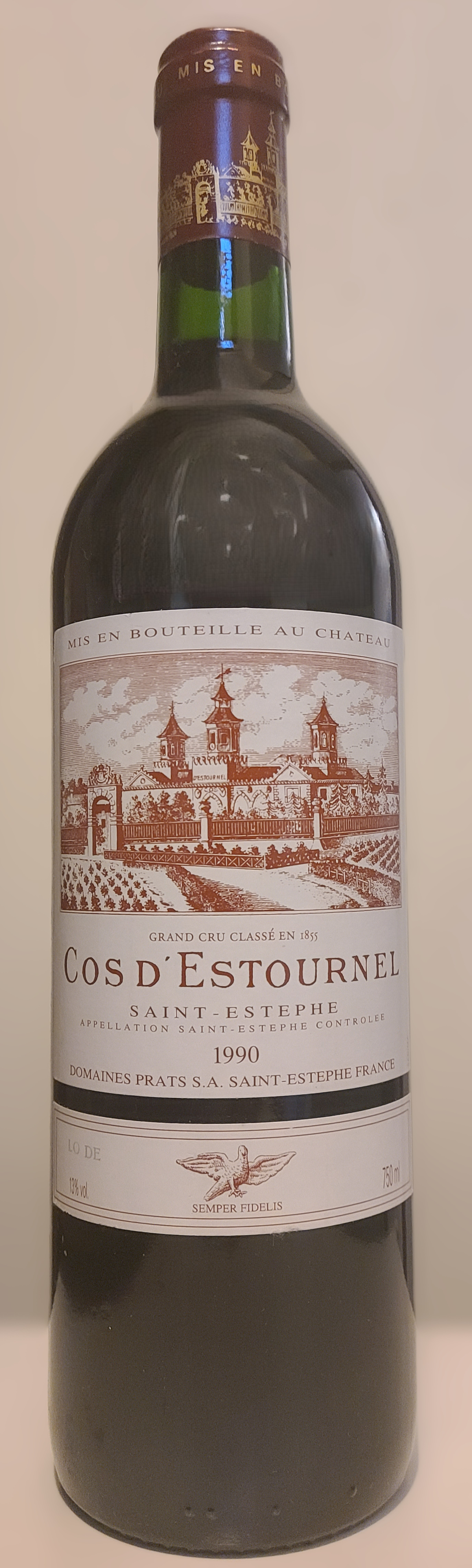

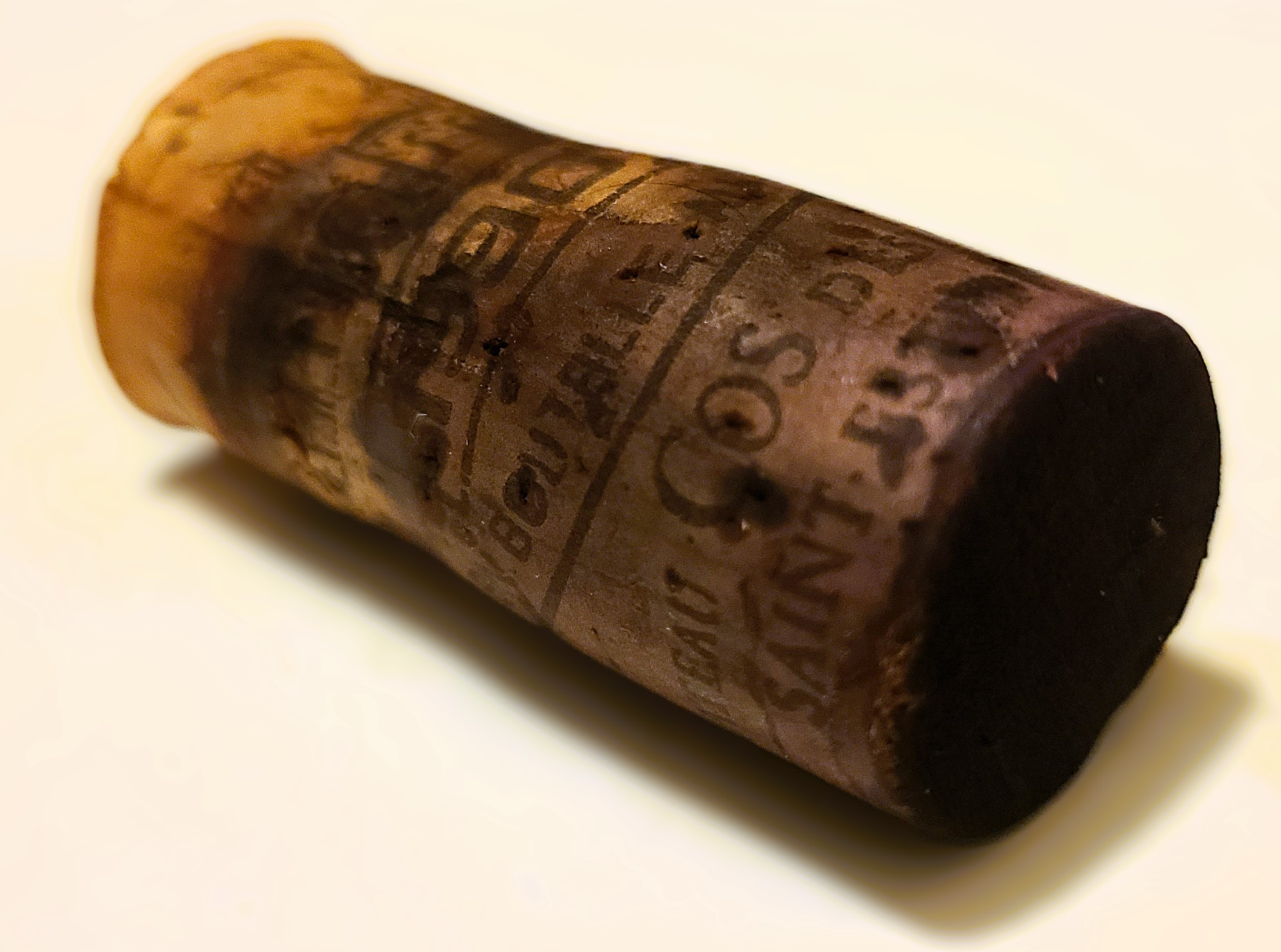
