= Château de Pez =

Vineyard in Bordeaux, France

Coordinates: 45.2584°N 0.7896°W

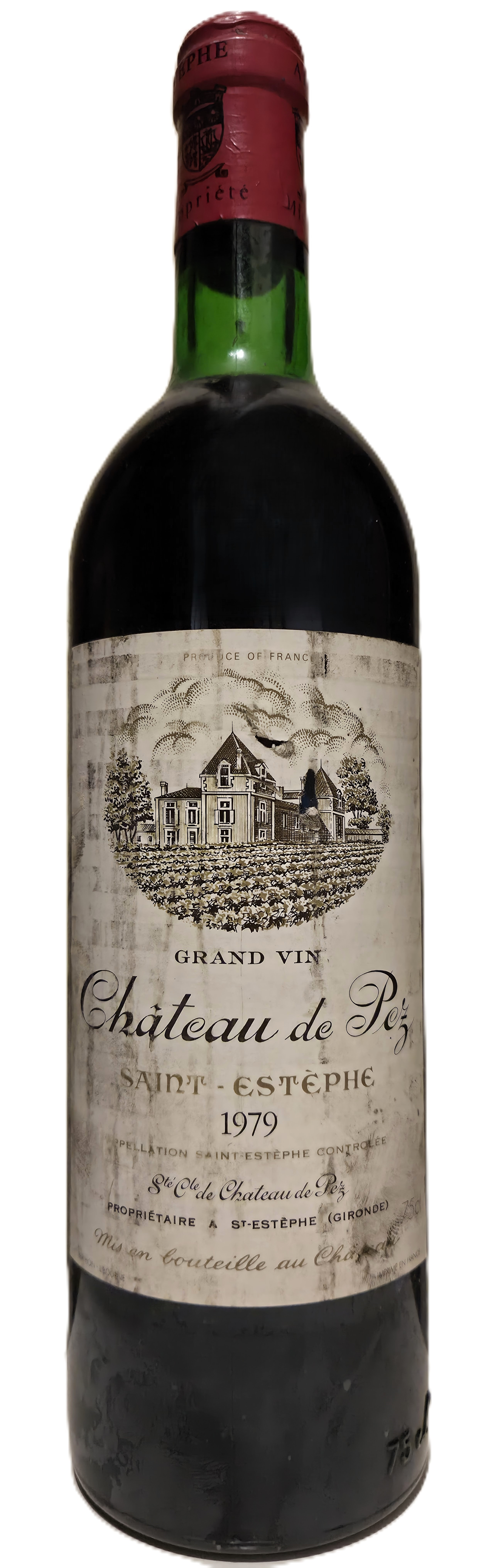
Grand Vin 1979

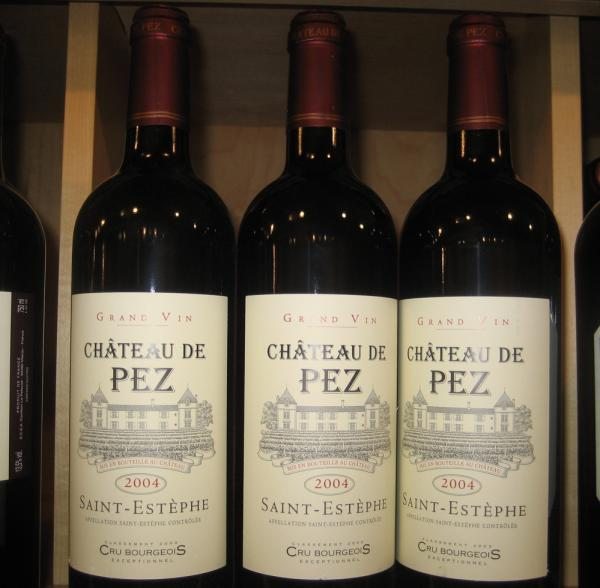
Bottles of Château de Pez with its Cru Bourgeois classification notes on the wine label

Château de Pez is a vineyard located across the road from Château Calon-Ségur, in the northern parts of Saint Estèphe. Traditionally one of the leading Bourgeois Supérieur wines of the Médoc, it is believed by some to deserve higher classification. In a 2003 Cru Bourgeois classification revision, it was listed as one of nine Cru Bourgeois Exceptionnels. It has a reputation of consistently producing wine that is both inexpensive and good.

== History ==
Created in 1452 by Jean de Briscos, the de Pez is one of the oldest wine-making estates in the Saint Estephe appellation. The château was owned by the Pontac family, also known for creating Château Haut-Brion in Pessac Leognan, for two centuries. The wine was sold under the Pontac label in London before any other Médoc wine.
