= Jean-Michel Cazes =

French winemaker (1935–2023)

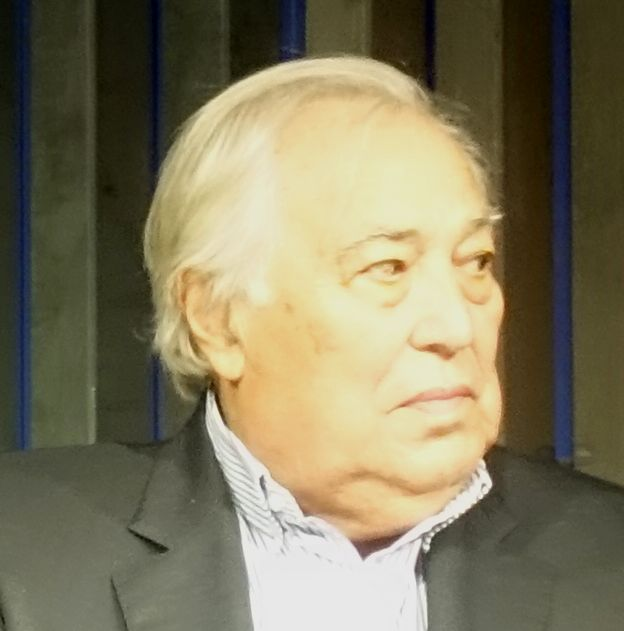
- Cazes in 2019
- Born: 25 March 1935; Bordeaux, France
- Died: 28 June 2023 (aged 88); Pauillac, France
- Education: Paris School of Mines; University of Texas M.S.
- Occupations: Food products executive, insurance executive
- Board member of: Bordeaux Wine Council (1976); Compagnie Medocaine, Bordeaux, France; ID Systemes, Bordeaux; Chateau de Cordeilan-Bages, Pauillac; Axa millesines, Pauillac, 1987
- Spouse: Maria-Thereza Carregal Ferreira (m. 1968)
- Children: 4
- Awards: Chevalier de la Legion d'Honneur

Jean-Michel Cazes (25 March 1935 – 28 June 2023) was a French winemaker and insurance executive. He managed the wine holdings of AXA Millésimes until 2000, the family insurance agency, and the Cazes family estates until 2006. He was the son of André Cazes and grandson of Jean-Charles Cazes who acquired the family's initial holdings.

== Biography ==
Cazes completed his degree at the École nationale supérieure des mines de Paris (1958) (where he also played Rugby), then earned an M.S. in petroleum engineering at University of Texas (1960) as a Rotary Scholar. He served in the French Air Force (1960–1962), leaving with the rank of lieutenant. He was a sales manager at IBM France (1962–1971) and president of STAD (Empain-Schneider Group) (1971–1973), both in Paris.

In 1973 or 1974 he returned to Pauillac, where his father was the longtime mayor, to manage the family's insurance and wine interests. He took over management of Château Lynch-Bages. Other properties include Chateau Villa Bel Air, Château Les Ormes-de-Pez, Château Cordeillan-Bages in Pauillac converted into a hotel and a restaurant of two Michelin stars, L'Ostal Cazes in Languedoc, Domaine des Sénéchaux in Châteauneuf-du-Pape, Xisto in Portugal, and Tapanappa in Coonawarra, South Australia.

Until 2000 Cazes ran wine properties for AXA Millésimes. French insurance companies are required to invest in French property, and under Claude Bebear the firm set up the AXA Millésimes subsidiary to invest in wineries. Their assets in Bordeaux included Château Pichon Longueville Baron, Château Suduiraut, Cantenac Brown, and Petit Village chateaux. Abroad they owned Quinta do Noval, a Port producer in the Douro Valley in Portugal, and the Tokaji producing Disznókő estate in Hungary.

Cazes began low key efforts to market his product to the People's Republic of China as early as 1990. He has toured wineries around Beijing, and attended the 2008 Beijing Olympics. By 2008 Lynch-Bages sold about 5% of its output in the PRC.

In 2002, he was awarded La Croix de Chevalier de la Légion d'Honneur, and in 2003 Cazes was chosen the "Man of the Year" by the wine magazine Decanter.

Cazes stepped down in 2006, handing over management of the family interests to his son Jean-Charles Cazes.

Cazes died on 28 June 2023, at the age of 88.

== See also ==
- List of wine personalities
