= Cru Bourgeois =

Wine classification

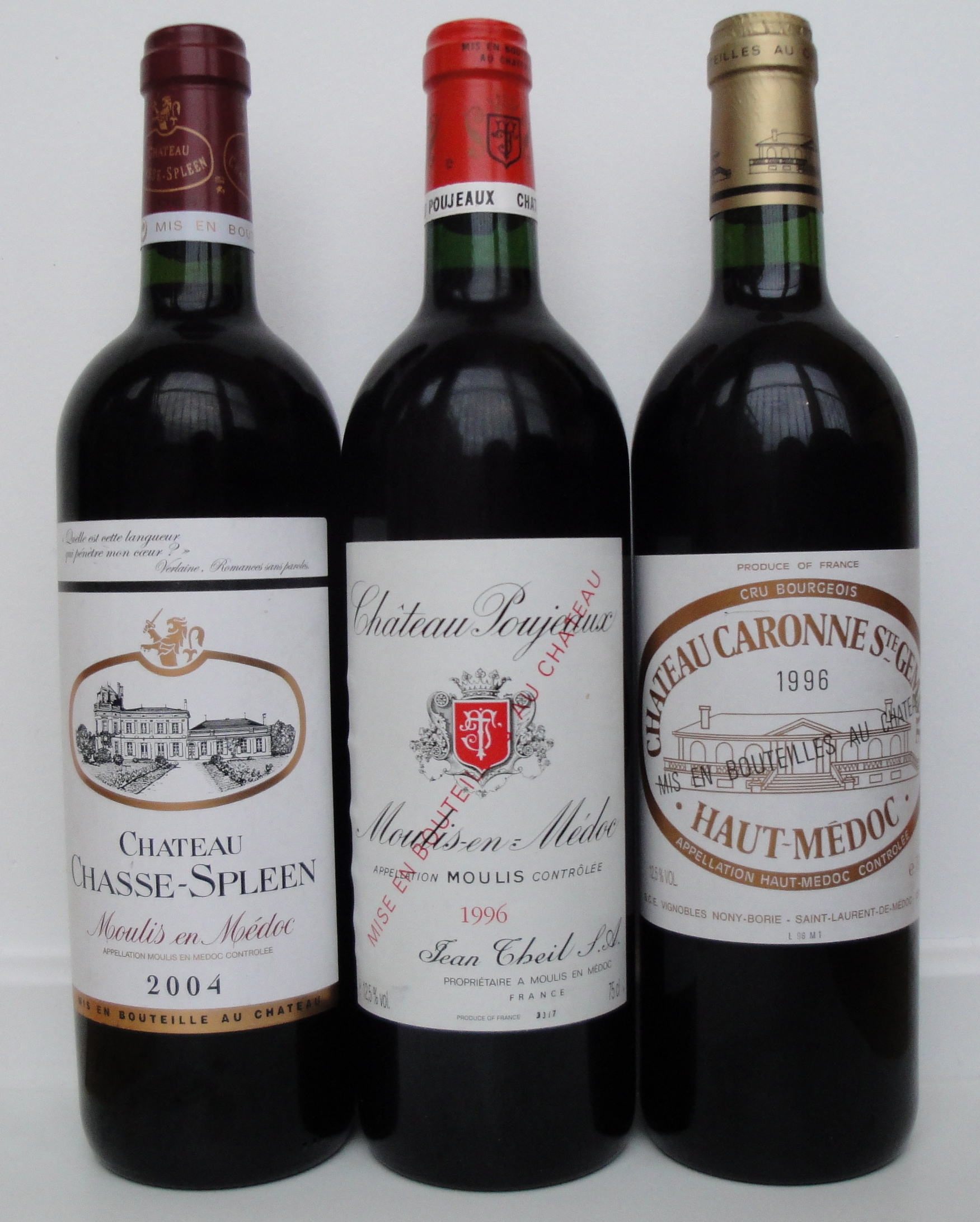
Three Cru Bourgeois wines. In the 2003 classification two were Crus Bourgeois Exceptionnels, Château Chasse-Spleen and Château Poujeaux, and one a Cru Bourgeois Supérieur, Château Caronne Sainte-Gemme.

The Cru Bourgeois classification lists some of the châteaux from the Médoc that were not included in the 1855 Classification of Crus Classés, or Classed Growths. Notionally, Cru Bourgeois is a level below Cru Classé, but still of high quality (formerly there were additional grades of Cru Artisan and Cru Paysan). Many wine writers consider that there is some overlap in quality between the Classed Growths and the Cru Bourgeois, although also saying that by and large the Classed Growths still represent the best wines.

The first Cru Bourgeois list was drawn up by the Bordeaux Chamber of Commerce and Chamber of Agriculture in 1932, selecting 444 estates for the classification. The words Cru Bourgeois were widely used on labels by the châteaux so listed, although the classification was never officially ratified. A substantial revision of the classification, dividing it into three tiers, was initiated in 2000 and finalised in 2003. This reduced the number of châteaux listed to 247. Following several legal turns, the 2003 Cru Bourgeois classification was annulled by the French court in 2007, and shortly afterwards all use of the term was banned.

In 2010, the Cru Bourgeois label was reintroduced, but in a significantly revised form. It now consists of only one level, and is awarded annually, as a mark of quality, to wines rather than to châteaux, on the basis of an assessment of both production methods and the finished product. Any property in the Médoc may apply. The lists are published approximately 2 years after the vintage, so the 2008 list was published in 2010, and the 2009 list was published in 2011. The 2009 list includes 246 wines.

An example of longevity and stability in the quality of its wine is the Chateau Magnol, in the Haut Medoc appellation, that have been Cru Bourgeois every single year since 1987.

== 2003 classification (annulled) ==
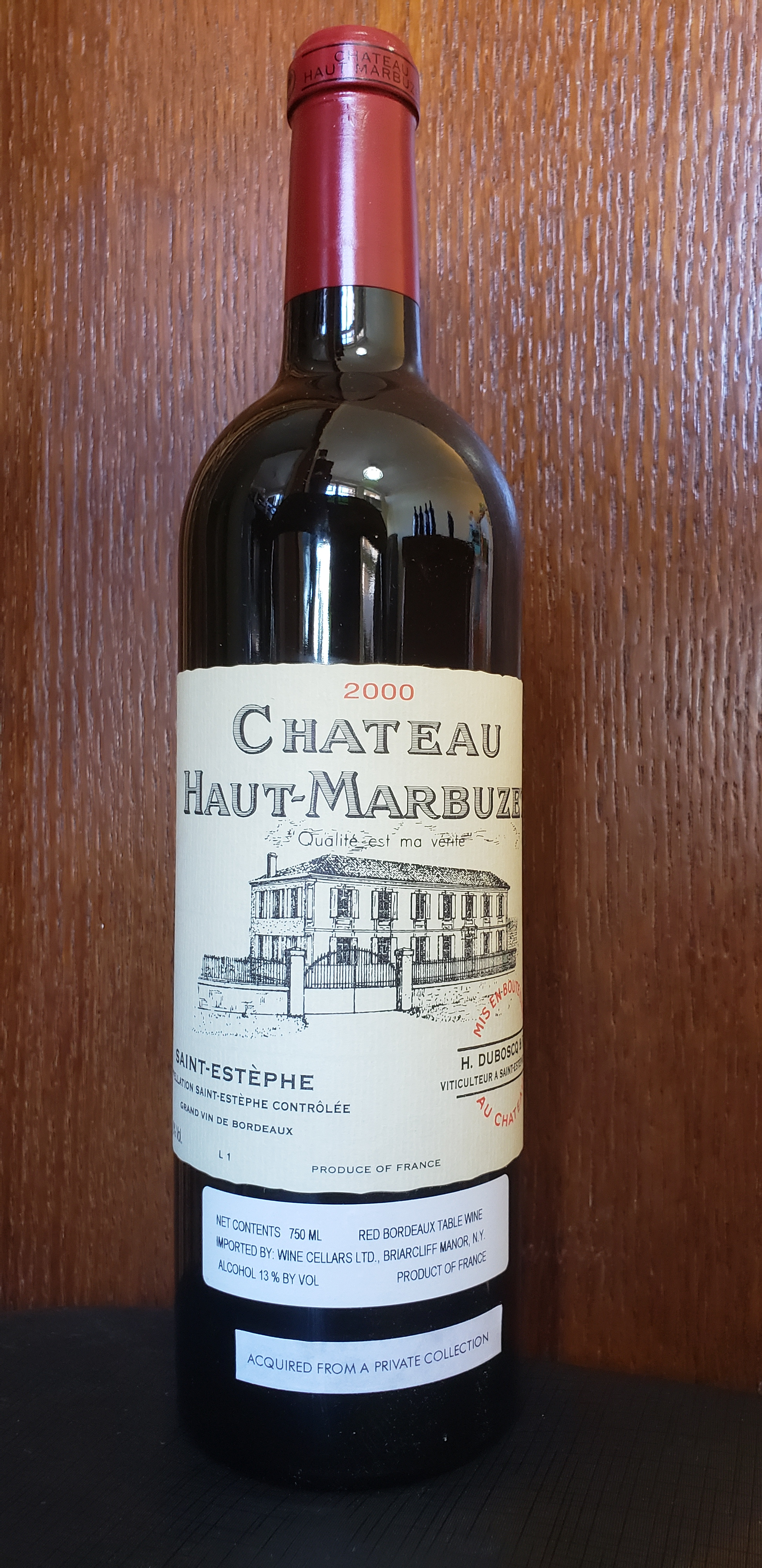
A bottle from 2000 vintage

The 2003 Cru Bourgeois classification (annulled in 2007) classified 247 properties in three tiers: Exceptionnel (9 properties), Supérieurs (87 properties) and straight Bourgeois (151 properties). The Crus Bourgeois Exceptionnels are listed in the following table, for historical interest:

| Crus Bourgeois Exceptionnels | Appellation |
|---|---|
| Château Chasse-Spleen | (Moulis-en-Médoc) |
| Château Haut-Marbuzet | (Saint-Estèphe) |
| Château Labégorce Zédé | (Margaux) |
| Château Les Ormes-de-Pez | (Saint-Estèphe) |
| Château de Pez | (Saint-Estèphe) |
| Château Phélan Ségur | (Saint-Estèphe) |
| Château Potensac | (Médoc) |
| Château Poujeaux | (Moulis-en-Médoc) |
| Château Siran | (Margaux) |

Note that some very highly regarded wines outside the 1855 classification such as Château Gloria and Château Sociando-Mallet did not apply for classification.

=== Annulment ===
There was considerable controversy regarding the 2003 classification as 77 châteaux which had been included in the 1932 list lost their Cru Bourgeois status. Many proprietors were unhappy, either because they had been excluded entirely, or because they had been included at a lower level than they had expected. Over 70 producers applied to court to contest their exclusion from the new ranking, and in 2004 the court voided their rankings, requiring them to be reassessed, but otherwise upheld the new system. However, in February 2007, Bordeaux magistrate Jean-Pierre Valeins, having found that the classification was 'not impartial' and 'tainted with illegality', annulled the 2003 revision, following an appeal by dissatisfied producers, led by Denis Hecquet, president of the Médoc winegrowers' union. In essence the court ruled that four of the panel had conflicting interests, as owners of relevant wineries, and could not be seen as independent. At this point, the 1932 classification was briefly reinstated, with its single tier and 444 estates.

In July 2007, following the intervention of the French fraud office, all use of the term Cru Bourgeois became illegal. As the 2005 vintages were already bottled and with further anticipated delays, the ruling was expected to be enforced starting with the 2007 vintage. The ban applied to all wines, also extending to those wineries in Sauternes, Côtes-de-Bourg and Blaye who used the term.

== 2010 reintroduction ==
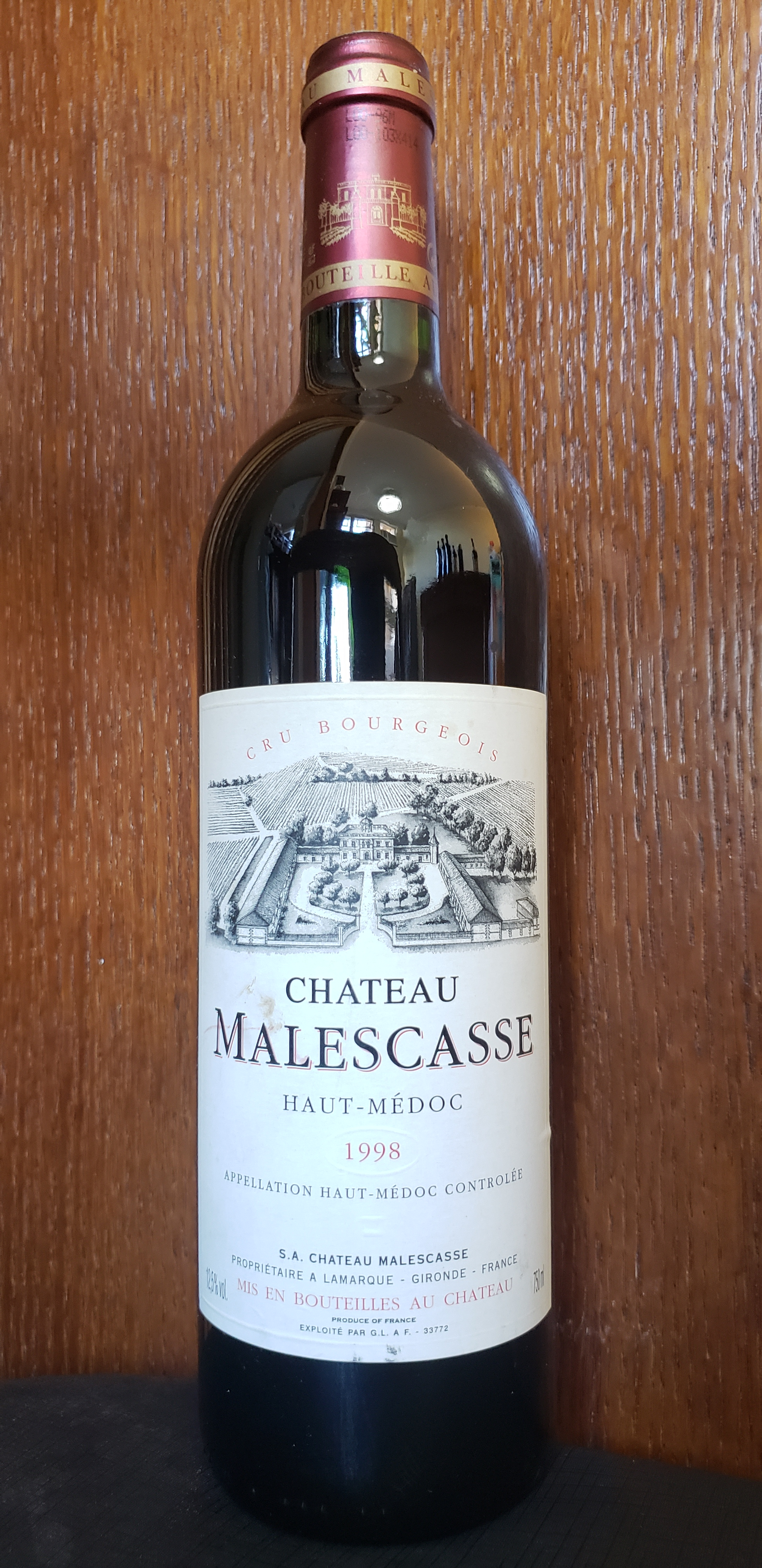
Château Malescasse, Cru Bourgeois of Haut-Medoc AOC from the pre-2003 classification

The Alliance des Crus Bourgeois responded to the annulment of the 2003 classification by taking a new motion to the government, to create a new certification adopting the term Label Cru Bourgeois, "not as a classification, but as a mark of quality" open to all Médoc wines, based on production and quality standards, to be assessed by an independent body. In February 2008, a format for the classification to be reintroduced was agreed by 180 estates from the defunct 2003 ranking, along with 95 new entrants. The revision demanded that estates adhere to a new set of production rules and independent quality testing in order to remain in the classification, and the terms Cru Bourgeois Supérieur or Cru Bourgeois Exceptionnel would no longer be used. Initially, the Alliance des Crus Bourgeois hoped to be able to reintroduce the classification in 2009, and apply it to the 2007 vintage, but this was not achieved. Instead, the new classification was unveiled in 2010, and applied to the 2008 vintage.

Of the 290 producers who applied for Cru Bourgeois status for their 2008 wine, 243 were successful. The Bureau Véritas (the newly formed independent body to oversee the assessment process) inspected the facilities of all the applicants to ensure compliance with the required production standards and the wines were submitted to blind tastings by panels of wine professionals, none of whom are châteaux owners and none of whom have family connections to the applicants.

In September 2011, the 2009 classification was announced. Of 304 applicants, 246 were successful.

While the new Cru Bourgeois classification was being prepared, six out of nine of the former Crus Bourgeois Exceptionnels decided to remain outside the new one-tier classification. Instead, they formed a group named Les Exceptionnels, primarily to stage common marketing events. Members of this group are Château Chasse-Spleen, Château Les Ormes-de-Pez, Château de Pez, Château Potensac, Château Poujeaux and Château Siran.

== 2020: Three new tiers ==
Alliance des Crus Bourgeois du Médoc announced a new Crus Bourgeois classification on February 20, 2020, that includes 179 Crus Bourgeois, 56 Crus Bourgeois Supérieurs and 14 Crus Bourgeois Exceptionnels. Estates ranked in the ‘Exceptionnels’ category include châteaux Paveil de Luze and d’Arsac in Margaux; châteaux Le Boscq, Lillian Ladouys and Le Crock in Saint-Estèphe; Château Lestage in Listrac-Médoc and eight properties in Haut-Médoc: châteaux d’Agassac, Arnauld, Belle-Vue, Cambon La Pelouse, Charmail, Malescasse, de Malleret and du Taillan.

The estates will be able to apply their classification to their labels from the 2018 vintage for the next five years with the next classification earmarked for 2022.

== Regions ==
Crus Bourgeois wineries can be found across the Médoc, but there is a particularly high concentration in the Saint-Estèphe appellation, on the plateau south and west of the village.

== Gallery ==
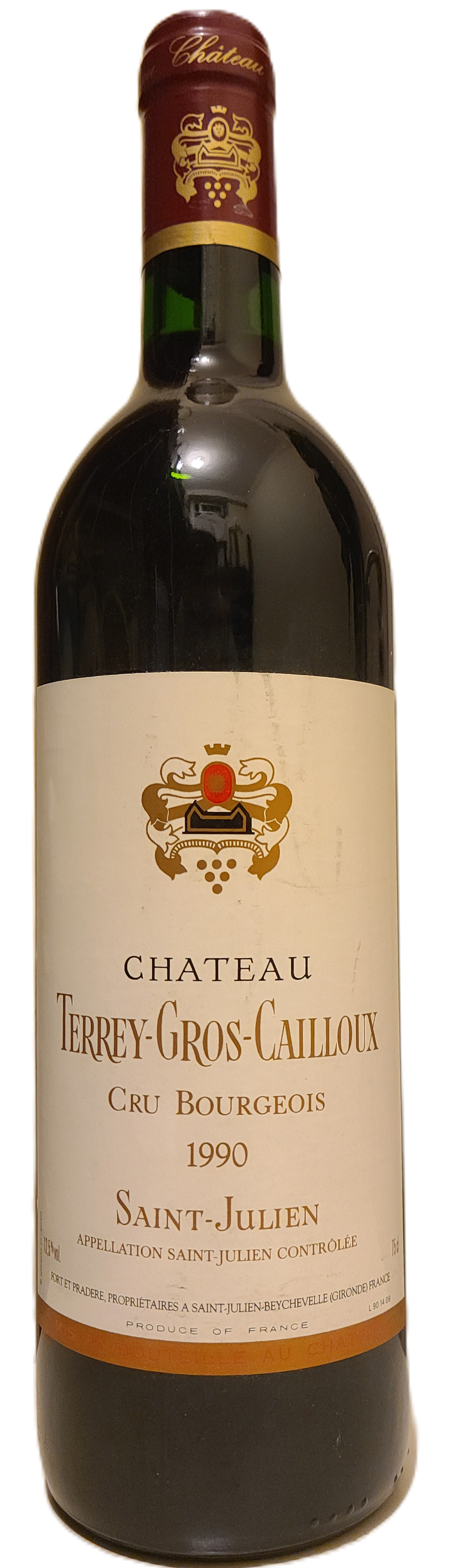
Chateau Terrey Gros Cailloux 1990

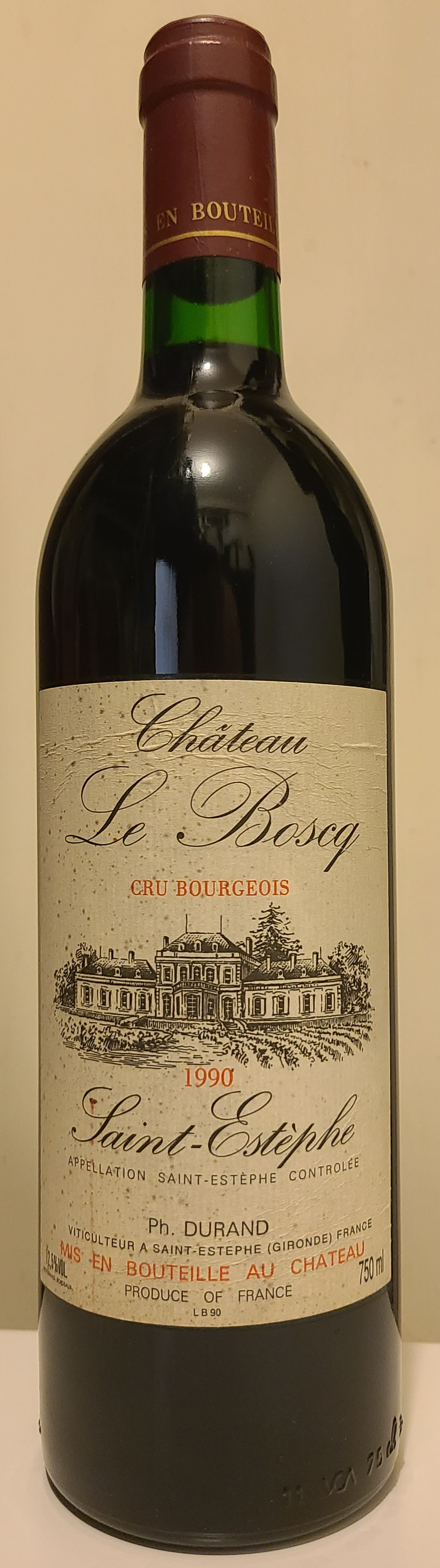
Chateau Le Boscq 1990

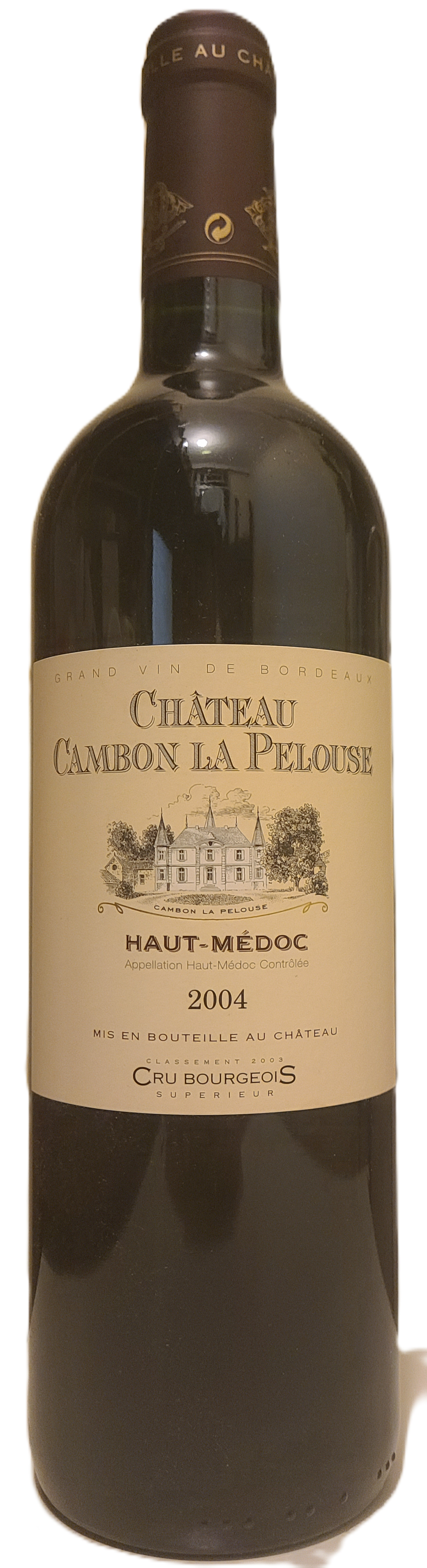
Chateau Cambon la Pelouse 2004

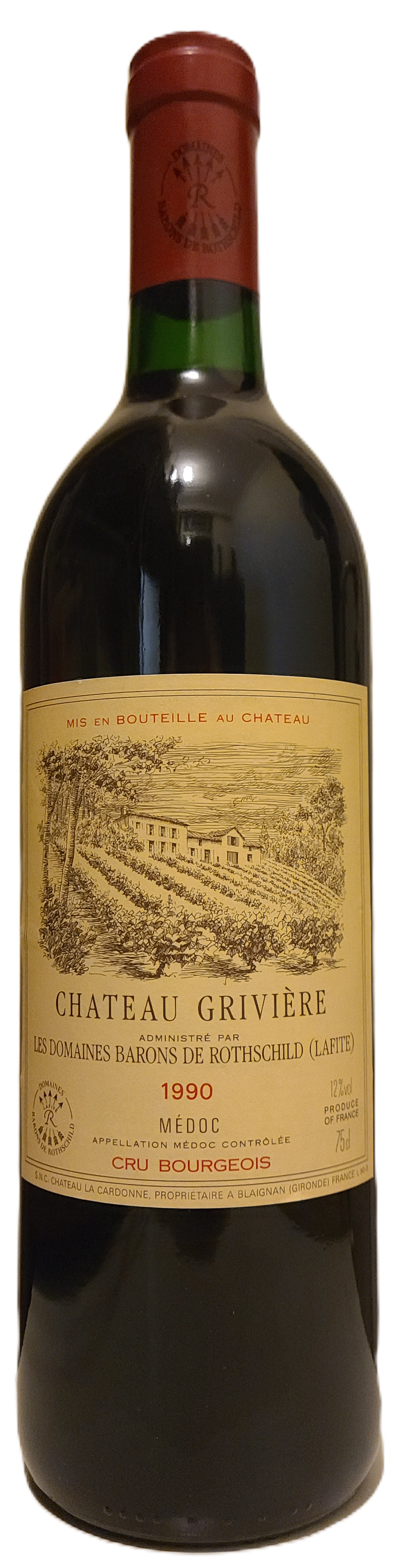
Château Grivière 1990

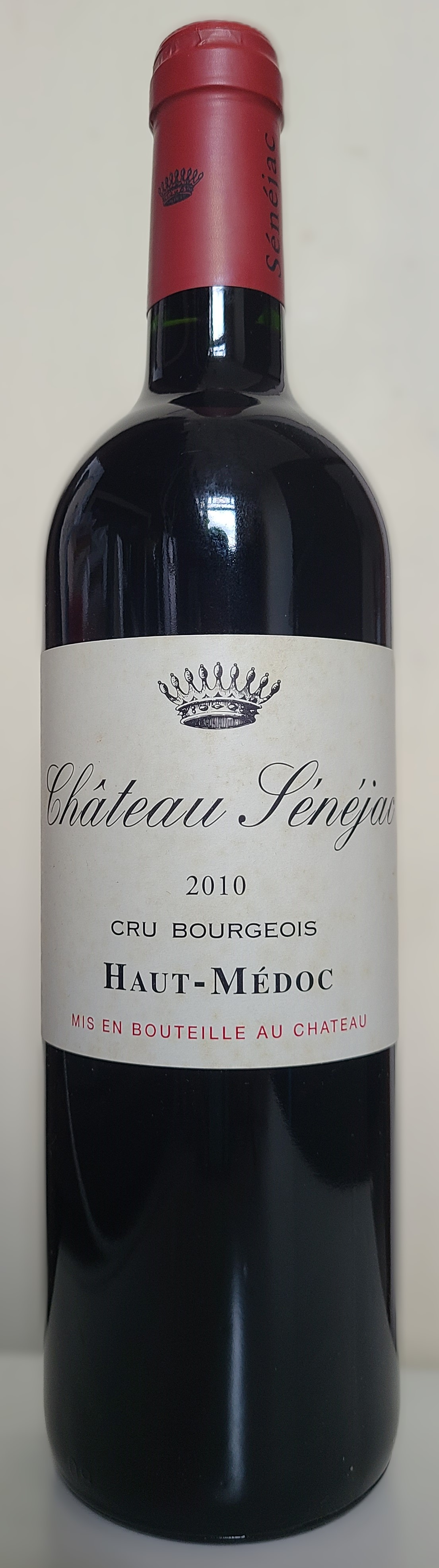
Château Senejac 2010

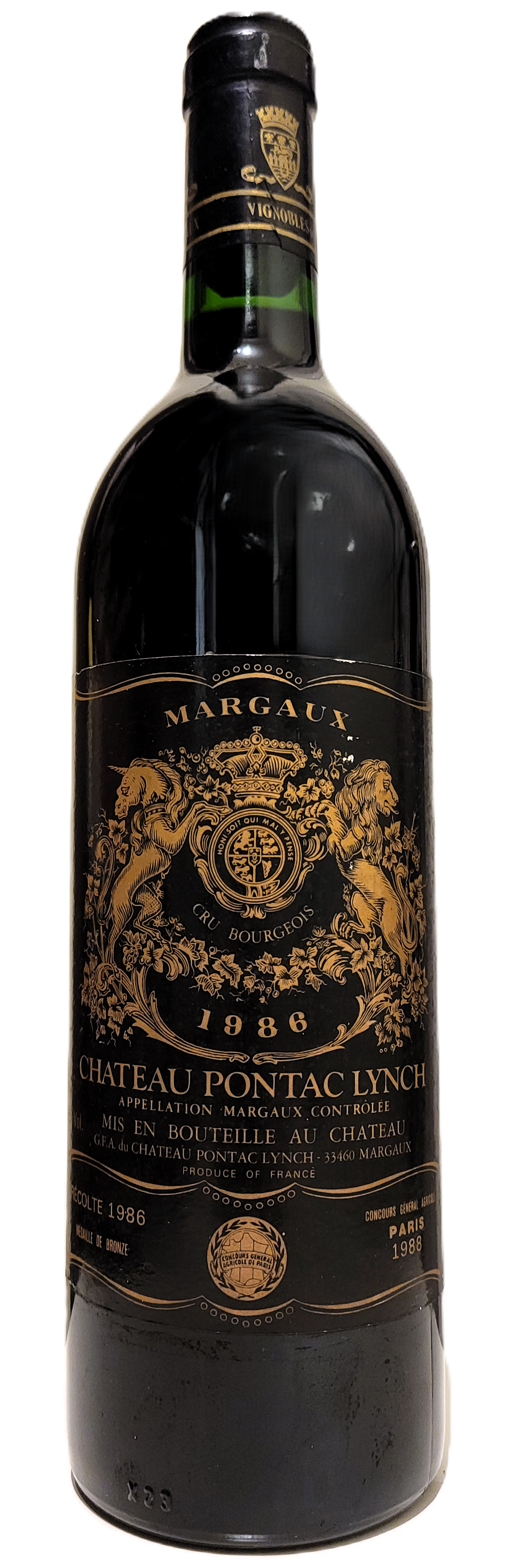
Château Pontac-Lynch 1986

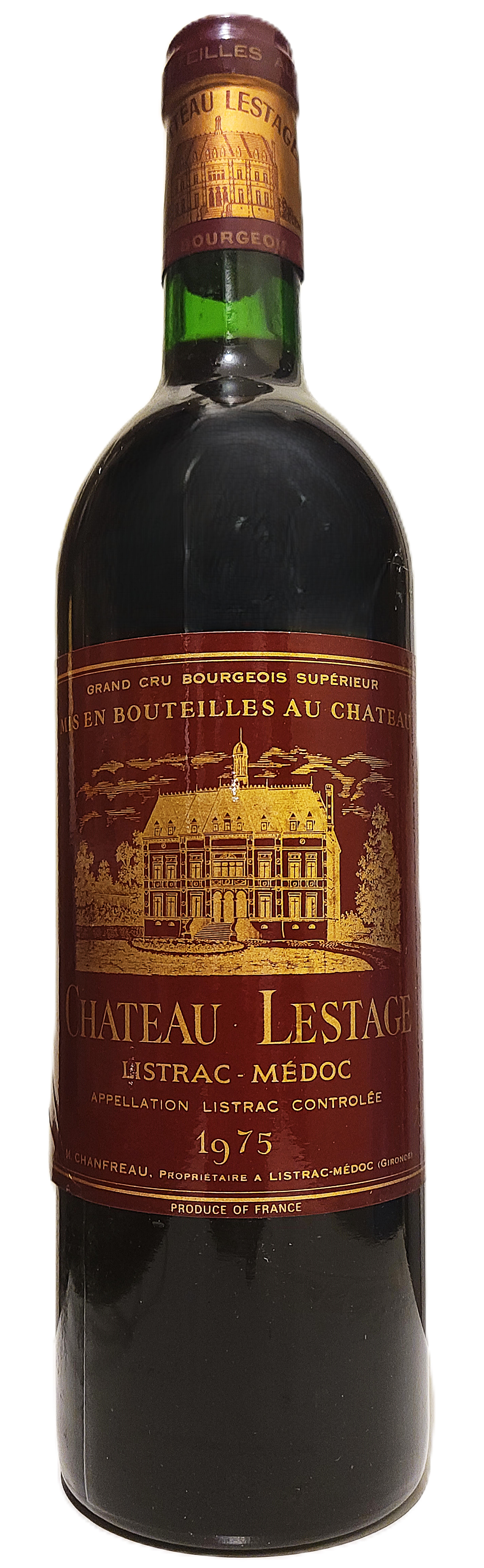
Château Lestage 1975

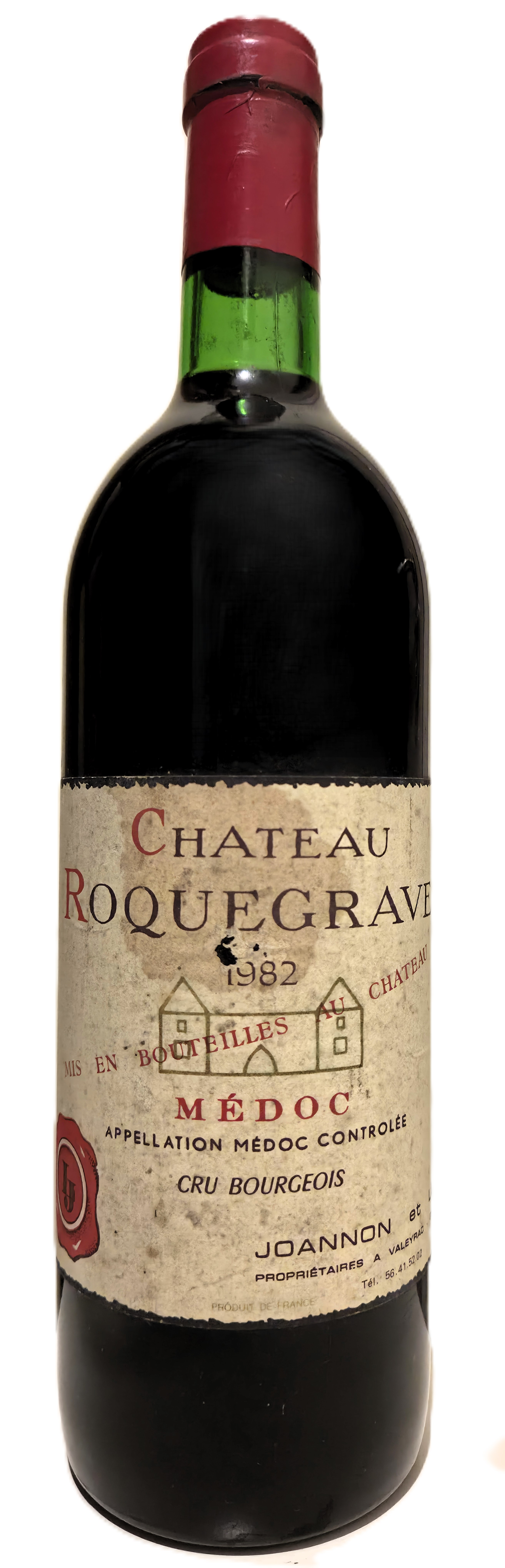
Chateau Roquegrave 1982

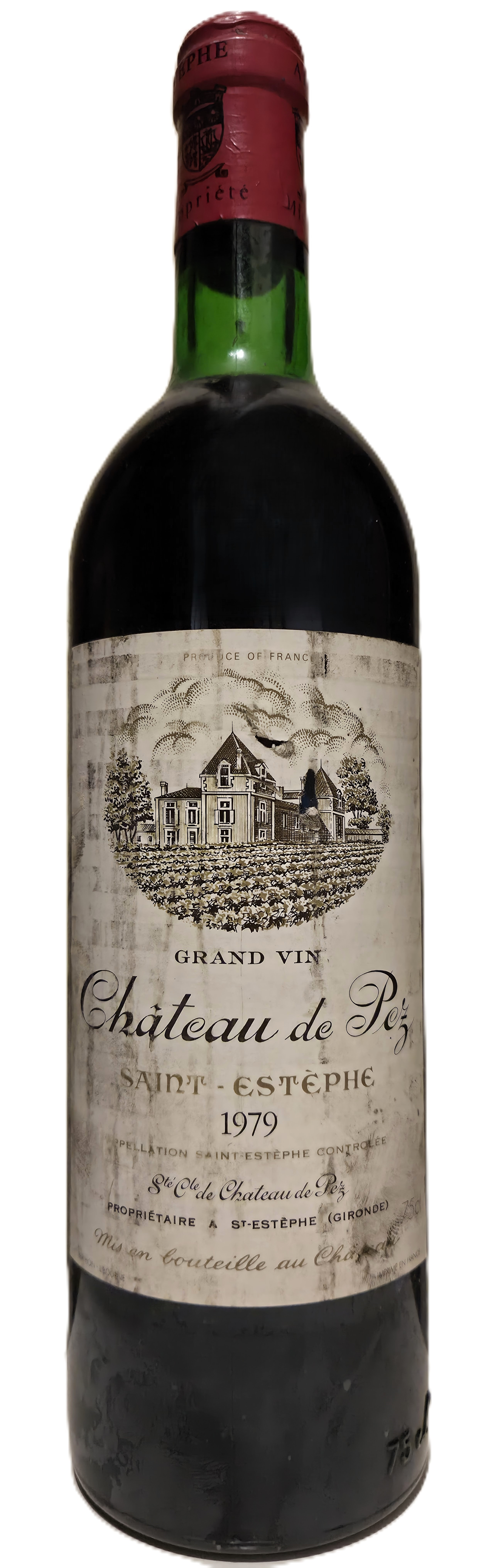
Château de Pez 1979

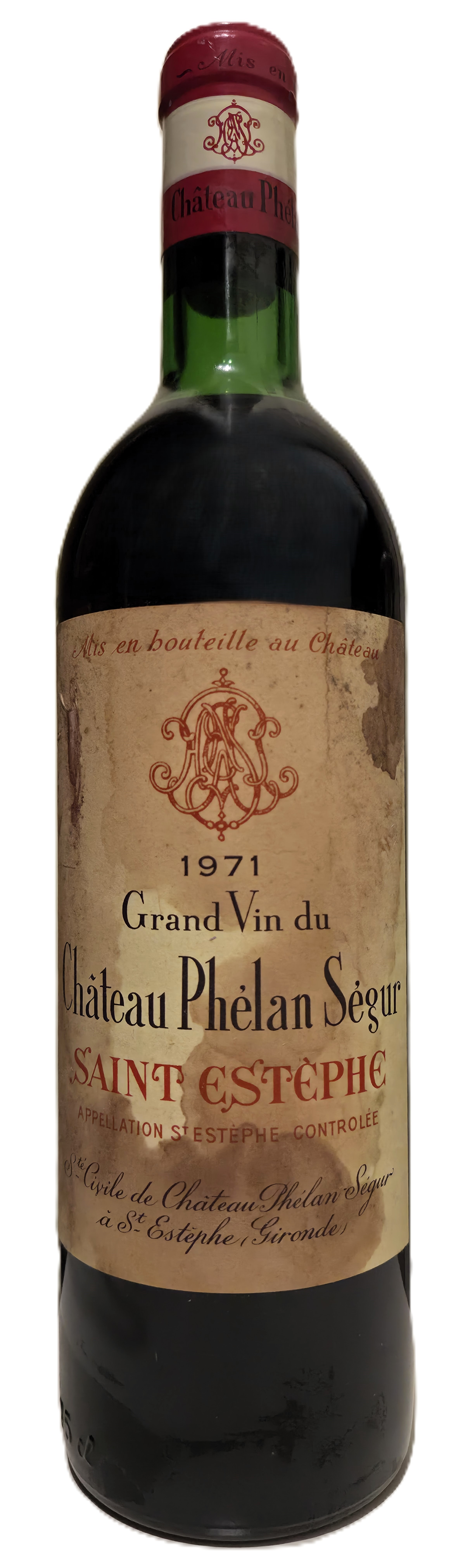
Château Phélan Ségur 1971

Chateau Tour du Haut Moulin 1990

Chateau Arnauld 1995

Chateau Coufran 1982

== See also ==
- Regional wine classification
- Bordeaux wine regions
- History of Bordeaux wine
