= Château Potensac =

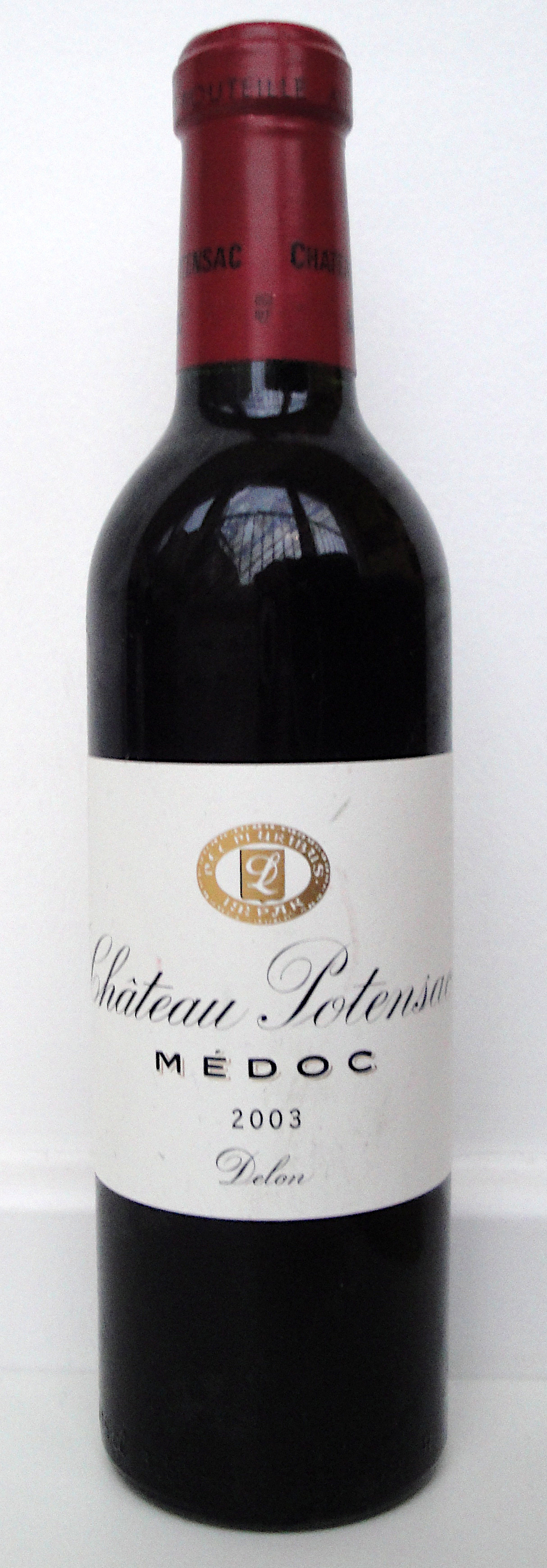
A half bottle of 2003 Château Potensac.

Château Potensac is a winery in the Médoc appellation of the Bordeaux wine region of France. The wine produced here was classified as one of 9 Cru Bourgeois Exceptionnels as of the 2003 listing. The classification was eventually banned from use in 2007.

Potensac is owned by the same owners as Château Léoville-Las Cases.
