= Clos Fourtet =

Bordeaux wine from the appellation Saint-Émilion

Coordinates: 44.89509°N 0.15807°W

Clos Fourtet, previously Château Clos Fourtet and archaically Camfourtet, is a Bordeaux wine from the appellation Saint-Émilion, ranked Premier grand cru classé B in the Classification of Saint-Émilion wine. The Clos Fourtet winery is located in the Right Bank of France's Bordeaux wine region in the commune of Saint-Émilion, in the department Gironde.

The estate also produces the second wine Closerie de Fourtet.

== History ==
Erected during the Middle Ages as a defensive fort, the property is situated opposite the main entrance to the old town of Saint-Émilion. Viticulture at what was then called Camfourtet (Camp Fourtet) began with the efforts of Léon Rulleau in the mid-18th century, who passed on the estate to his nephew Elie Rulleau who had the present château built. Records show that in 1789 the property was valued at 100,000 livres. The estate's name was altered to Clos Fourtet by the Rulleau family in 1868.

Fernand Ginestet acquired the estate in 1919, in the same year that he purchased the Pomerol estate Château Petit-Village. In 1949 it was then sold by his son Pierre Ginestet in order to finance control of Château Margaux, and purchased by François Lurton.

The Lurton family sold Clos Fourtet in 2001, reportedly for the sum of US$66.8 million. Currently the estate is owned by Philippe Cuvelier, also owner of Château Poujeaux, with the oenologist Stéphane Derenoncourt as consultant.

== Production ==
The vineyard area extends to 19 hectares, with the grape varieties split between 85% Merlot, 10% Cabernet Sauvignon and 5% Cabernet Franc. 5,000 cases of the Grand vin Clos Fourtet are produced annually, while 2,500 cases of the second wine Closerie de Fourtet are usually produced.
