= Château Cos Labory =

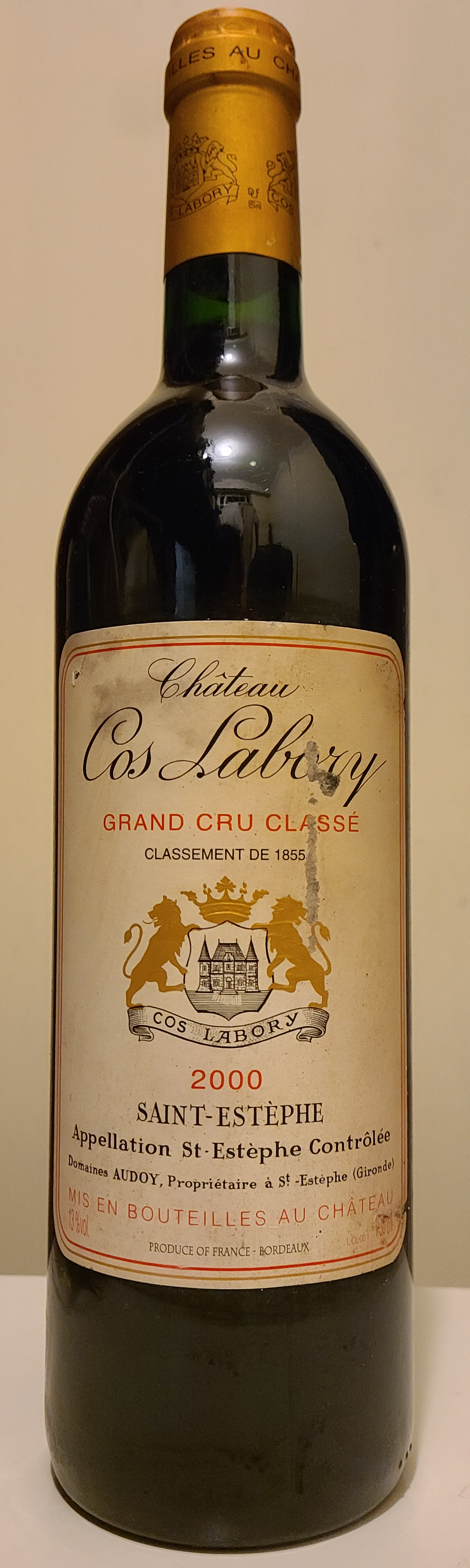
Grand Vin 2000

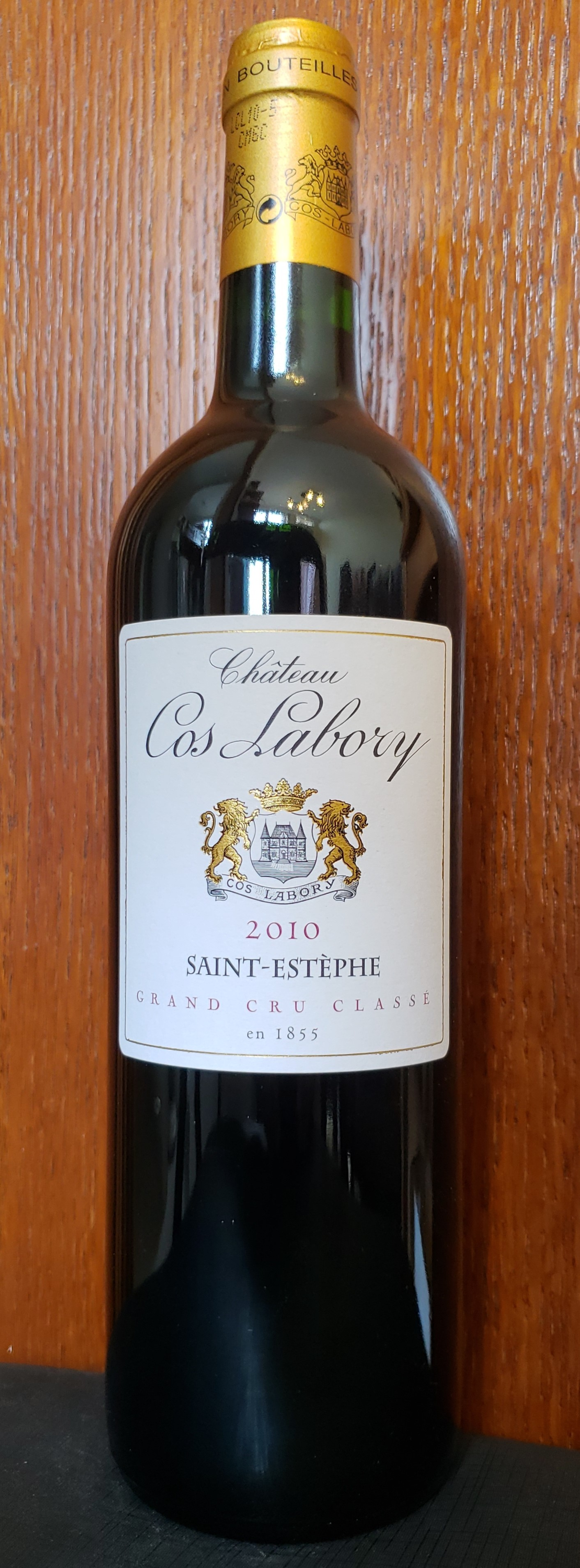
Grand Vin 2010

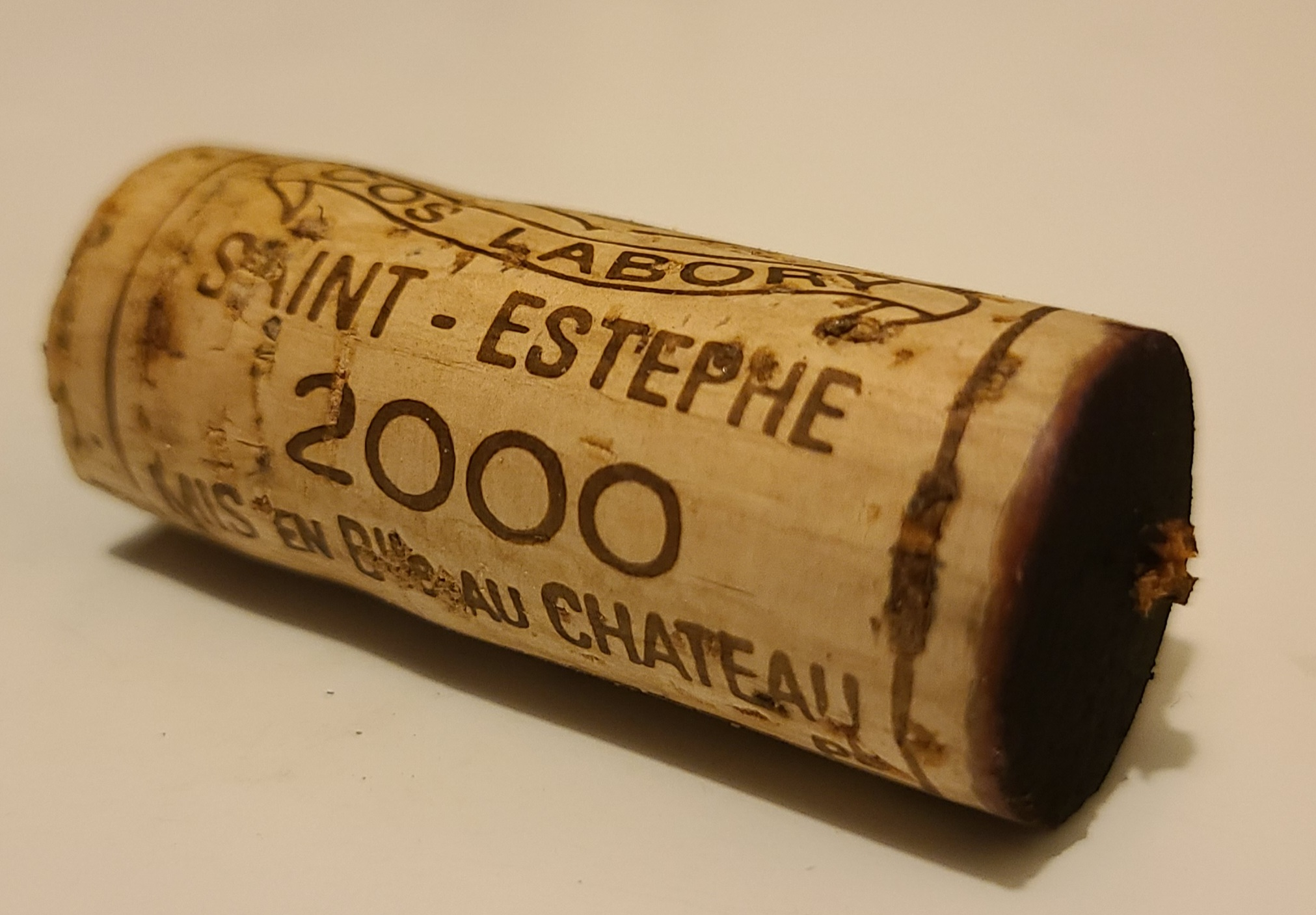
Cork

Château Cos Labory is a winery in the Saint-Estèphe appellation of the Bordeaux region of France. The wine produced here was classified as one of eighteen Cinquièmes Crus (Fifth Growths) in the Bordeaux Wine Official Classification of 1855.

The name of the estate comes from its geographical location on the Cos hill and the name of François Labory, who was the first owner until 1845. Mr. d'Estournel then acquired it before selling it again to an English banker, Charles Martyns in 1852. The property was finally taken over by George Weber in the 1930s, who bequeathed it to his daughter and son-in-law, François Audoy in 1959.

In 1971, the couple acquired the neighbouring estate, Château Andron Blanquet. Their sons worked with them on the two estates for a few years and then the elder Bernard took over the running of the properties.

== Wines ==
Cos Labory wines are fruit-forward wines that are meant to be consumed fairly young for a classified Bordeaux wine.
