= Château Labégorce Zédé =

Coordinates: 45.05825°N 0.69128°W

The winery of what was formerly known separately as Château Labégorce-Margaux and Château Labégorce-Zédé lies in the commune of Margaux in the Médoc region in the département of Gironde. In 2005, the two wines were consolidated under the name Château Labégorce, while Zédé de Labégorce is used as a name for the second wine. Château Labégorce-Zédé was classified as one of 9 Crus Bourgeois Exceptionnels as of the 2003 listing.

The vineyard is planted in gravelly terrain on the left bank of the Garonne estuary in the Margaux Appellation d'Origine Contrôlée of the Bordeaux region of France.
