= Château Lynch-Bages =

Winery in the Bordeaux region of France

Coordinates: 45.19083°N 0.75561°W

Château Lynch-Bages is a winery in the Pauillac appellation of the Bordeaux region of France. Château Lynch-Bages is also the name of the red wine produced by this property. The wine produced here was classified as one of eighteen Cinquièmes Crus (Fifth Growths) in the Bordeaux Wine Official Classification of 1855.

== History ==

Thomas Lynch was a descendant of the Tribes of Galway. His father John emigrated in 1691 from Galway, Ireland to Bordeaux, inherited an estate in the village of Bages through his wife, Elizabeth, in 1749. This year represents the foundation of Château Lynch-Bages, which Thomas passed on to his son, Jean-Baptiste, upon his marriage in 1779. Jean-Baptiste soon handed over supervision to his brother Michel who maintained responsibility for the Bages estate until 1824, when the family sold it to a Swiss wine merchant, Sebastien Jurine, who had recently moved to Bordeaux.

Château Lynch-Bages remained in the hands of the Jurine family, followed by the Cayrou family, for over a hundred years. In 1934, Jean-Charles Cazes rented the property from its then owner, Felix de Vial, subsequently purchasing it in 1938. After Jean-Charles Cazes' death, aged 95, in 1972, the estate has been largely managed by his grandson, Jean-Michel Cazes.

In the late 1980s, the Axa Millésimes group began to develop a portfolio of wine property holdings, and approached Jean-Michel Cazes for help (Claude Bébéar, the Axa President, was a long-time Cazes family friend). They established Châteaux & Associés, which Cazes ran until he reached 65, and which by the end of the twentieth century owned many vineyards across Europe. Ownership of Château Lynch-Bages, however, remains with the Cazes family.

In 2017, the Cazes family has acquired Château Haut-Batailley, the 1855 Grand Cru Classé estate in Pauillac.

== Vineyard ==
The 90 hectares (220 acres) of Château Lynch-Bages are located just outside the town of Pauillac. The vineyard occupies a gravel ridge looking down over the Gironde estuary. The well-drained soil consists mainly of deep gravel beds over a limestone sub-strata, and it is planted predominantly with red wine grape varieties (73% Cabernet Sauvignon, 15% Merlot, 10% Cabernet Franc and 2% Petit Verdot). There is also a small (approximately 4.5 ha (11 acres)) plot planted with white varieties (40% Semillon, 40% Sauvignon blanc and 20% Muscadelle).

== Wine ==
Château Lynch-Bages is primarily known for its eponymous red wine, of which approximately 25,000 cases are made in an average year. The malolactic fermentation takes place mainly in large stainless steel tanks, and the wine then spends about 15 months in oak barrels (of which some 50-60% are new) before bottling.

As of 2008, the second label of Lynch-Bages will be called, "Echo de Lynch-Bages". A third wine has now been added, called "Pauillac de Lynch-Bages".

Since 1990, it has produced a white wine, "Blanc de Lynch-Bages", made from Sauvignon Blanc, Sémillon, and Muscadelle.
