= Château Phélan Ségur =

Vineyard in Bordeaux, France

Coordinates: 45.26161°N 0.76846°W

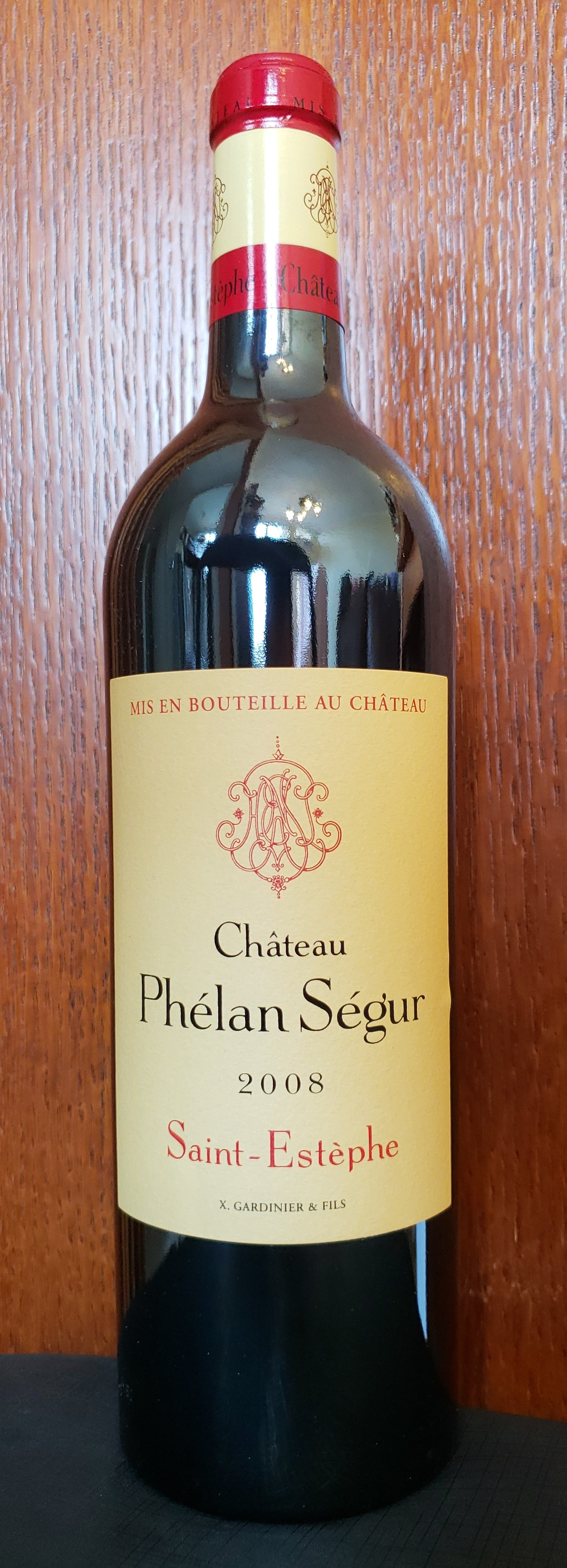
Grand Vin 2008

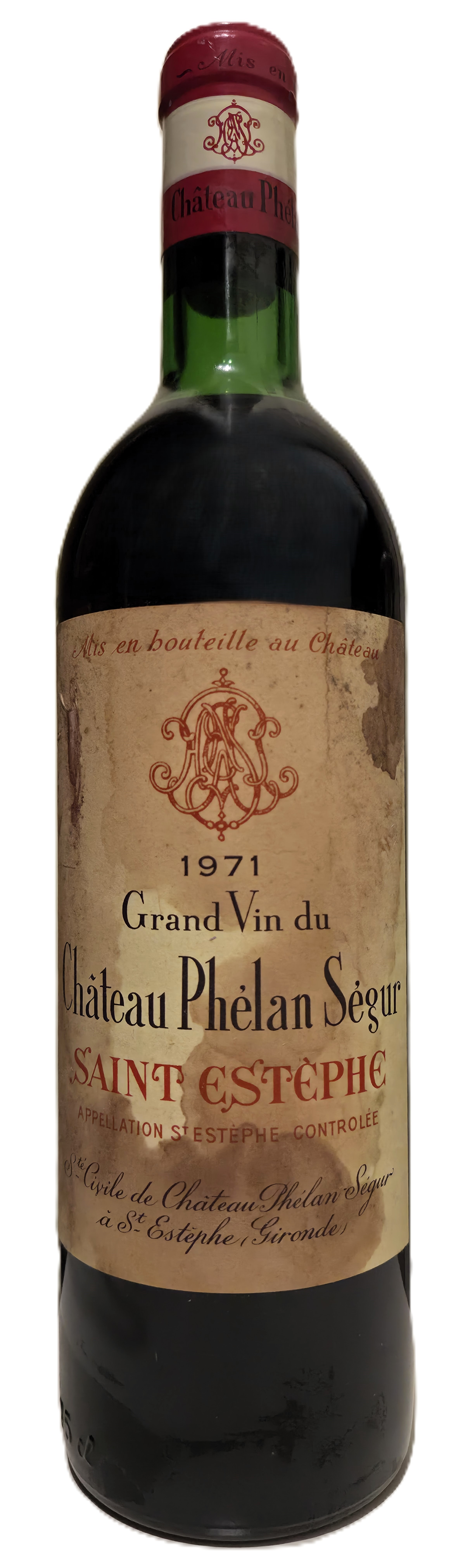
Grand Vin 1971

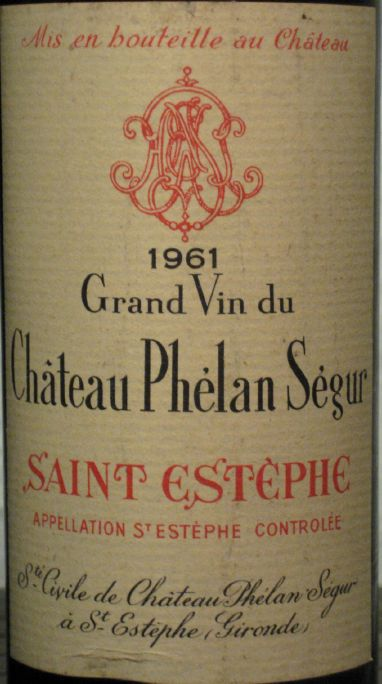
Detail of a Château Phélan Ségur 1961 label

Château Phélan Ségur lies in the commune of Saint-Estèphe in the Bordeaux region of France, neighbouring vineyards Château Calon-Ségur and Château Montrose. In a 2003 Cru Bourgeois classification revision, it was listed as one of 9 Cru Bourgeois Exceptionnels.

A second wine is produced since 1986, under the label Frank Phelan. A more recent venture is a wine titled La Croix Bonis.

== History ==
The Irishman Bernard Phelan (1770–1841) acquired the Domaine Le Clos de Garamey in 1805 and Ségur de Cabarnac in 1810. In Ireland, he was a neighbour and friend of Hugh Barton who established Château Léoville-Barton. By his death in 1841 the estate combined to form Château Ségur de Garamey, which passed on to his son Frank Phelan, 30 years a mayor of Saint-Estèphe. The property was sold in July 1919 to Joseph Chayoux, President of Champagne Chamber of Commerce, whom further developed the brand until before the First World War when the property was sold for large fortune on 1928 to a city consortium headed by his nephew René Chayoux, before the financial crisis of 1930, upon the death of René the operation was managed by a trust that eventually sold the brand and its facilities.

From 1985 until 2017, the operation was owned by the Gardinier Group of Xavier Gardinier, with sons Thierry, Stéphane and Laurent. Michel Rolland is employed as a consulting enologist.

In 2017 Belgian Philippe Van de Vyvere, CEO of Sea-Invest, became the new owner.

== Production ==
The vineyard area extends 89 hectares or 220 acres. The grape varieties used are 50% Merlot, 45% Cabernet Sauvignon, 4% Cabernet Franc, and 1% Petit Verdot.

== In pop culture ==
Dr. Hannibal Lecter drinks a glass of 1996 Château Phélan Ségur Saint-Estèphe in the last scene of the 2001 thriller Hannibal.
