= Alexis Lichine's classification of Bordeaux wine =

In considering the Bordeaux Wine Official Classification of 1855, Alexis Lichine held the opinion that the list, some hundred years after the selection was made, no longer expressed the whole truth concerning the ranking of Bordeaux wine. Working for a reevaluation and change of structure of the classification of Bordeaux estates, he ended up spending much of his professional life on a campaign that lasted more than thirty years to accomplish a revision. Having published his Classification des Grands Crus Rouges de Bordeaux in 1962, with several revisions over the following years, Lichine came to be viewed as "the doyen of unofficial classification compilers".

== Reclassification ==
In 1959, a committee of which Lichine was a member as well as leading Bordeaux growers, shippers and brokers, was formed to decide what was to be done about reclassifying the work of 1855. Investigations revealed to what extent parcels of land had exchanged hands, some were considered insignificant but in other cases important transfers of terrain had taken place. It is acknowledged that at the time the list was compiled in great haste, primarily on the basis of which estates had consistently commanded the highest prices. While there was widespread agreement the 1855 classification had flaws, a general view remained that it was impossible to improve upon it.

The committee made a formal request to proceed with the revision in 1960. Opting for three categories instead of five, removing 18 chateaux and adding 13 new ones with updates every five years provoked reactions of outrage among those who faced great loss, "Château owners demoted or entirely deleted… condemned the ranking as malicious, incompetent and unjust." The Institut National des Appellations d'Origine (INAO) was called to arbitrate, but it became decided that the jurisdiction of INAO was too limited to resolve a matter of this complexity. After two years of efforts, the Bordeaux Chamber of Commerce and Académie des Vins de Bordeaux also became involved in the debate surrounding the reforms. Recognising that the process would take a great deal of time, Lichine decided to publish his own classification.

== Goals ==
In agreement with the committee, Lichine believed that, just as the principal philosophy behind the 1855 classification, price would be the most reliable indicator, but a revision could not let the transfer of first-rate soil go unchallenged. It was also important to identify cases where highly classified estates had become surpassed by those rated Fifth Growth or Cru Bourgeois, and addressing the 1855 classification's neglect of properties from other areas than Médoc, namely those of Graves, Saint-Émilion and Pomerol. Attempting to bring these areas together under one classification was considered unique to the Lichine rating.

Lichine also believed that no classification could be planned for a shorter span than 25–50 years since frequent changes would create consumer confusion and loss of public confidence, but saw the 1855 classification as evidence that no ruling can remain valid indefinitely.

Lichine was convinced that rankings of "first", "second", etc. were a mistake that should not be repeated, unfairly implying that there was, for instance, something second-rate about a Second Growth. Choosing to adapt and expand on the ranks used in the classifications of Graves and Saint-Émilion, Lichine arrived at the categories: Outstanding Growths, Exceptional Growths, Great Growths, Superior Growths and Good Growths.

Lichine, chosen the "1987 Man of the Year" by Decanter for achievements in wine, successfully revising the 1855 classification was not one of them.

Among the most visible changes was the elevation of Château Mouton Rothschild from its second growth status to Cru Hors Classe, which was the only of his suggestions ever to be realised. Mouton Rothschild was promoted to Premier Cru status in 1973.

== Publications ==
Lichine's classification was published in 1962 and revised in 1966. Later revisions followed until the last version was published in 1985, though the final classification was dated to 1978. Never coming to fruition before Lichine's death, some of the reasons are believed to be the 1855 establishment's political muscle, prosperity and prospects, social status, market clout, professional and personal prestige and conservatism.

Resigned to the fact that no revision would be made, Lichine wrote in 1986, "when one considers the outcry, disputes and lawsuits brought about by a new classification proposed for St.-Emilion in 1985, one must reluctantly conclude that no such new classification - however much needed - is likely to win adoption."

== Other classifications ==
Other published classifications that attempt to revise the 1855 ranking include a top 100 ranking by Robert Parker and L'histoire de la vigne & du vin (English: The History of Wine and the Vine) by Bernard and Henri Enjalbert, efforts by Clive Coates (MW) and David Peppercorn (MW).

A broader classification is The Liv-ex Classification, by the British wine exchange Liv-ex, which classifies the wines of the world into five tiers, based solely on price, like the 1855 Bordeaux classification. This started in 2009 as The Liv-ex Bordeaux Classification, and has since been updated every two years and expanded globally.

== Classification des Grands Crus Rouges de Bordeaux ==
The final 1978 revision with comparison notes to the 1966 revision.

Haut-Médoc	Graves	Saint-Émilion	Pomerol

Crus Hors Classe
Château Lafite Rothschild	Château Margaux	Château Latour
Château Mouton Rothschild	Château Haut-Brion	Château Cheval Blanc
Château Ausone	Château Pétrus	
Crus Exceptionnels
Château Beychevelle	Château Brane-Cantenac	Château Cos d'Estournel^{[*]}
Château Ducru-Beaucaillou^{[*]}	Château Gruaud-Larose	Château Lascombes
Château Léoville Barton	Château Léoville-Las Cases^{[*]}	Château Léoville-Poyferré
Château Montrose	Château Palmer	Château Pichon Lalande
Château Pichon Longueville	Domaine de Chevalier^{[*]}	Château La Mission Haut-Brion^{[*]}
Château Pape Clément^{[*]}^{[a]}	Château Figeac^{[*]}	Château Magdelaine^{[a]}
Château La Conseillante	Château l'Évangile	Château Lafleur^{[a]}
Château La Fleur-Pétrus^{[a]}	Château Trotanoy^{[a]}	
Grands Crus
Château Branaire	Château Calon-Ségur^{[b]}	Château Cantemerle^{[b]}
Château Cantenac-Brown	Château Dufort	Château Giscours^{[*]}
Château d'Issan	Château La Lagune	Château Lynch-Bages^{[*]}^{[b]}
Château Malescot St. Exupéry	Château Mouton-Baron-Philippe	Château Prieuré-Lichine^{[*]}
Château Rausan-Ségla	Château Rauzan-Gassies	Château Talbot
Château Haut-Bailly^{[*]}	Château Beau-Séjour Bécot^{[a]}	Château Belair^{[*]}^{[b]}
Château Canon^{[*]}^{[b]}	Clos Fourtet	Château La Gaffelière^{[b]}
Château Pavie	Château Trottevieille^{[a]}	Château Gazin
Château Latour à Pomerol^{[a]}	Château Petit-Village^{[*]}	Vieux Château Certan^{[*]}^{[b]}
Château Nenin^{[a]}
Crus Supérieurs
Château Batailley	Château Boyd-Cantenac^{[*]}^{[a]}	Château Chasse-Spleen
Château Clerc-Milon-Rothschild^{[a]}	Château Gloria	Château Grand-Puy-Lacoste^{[b]}
Château Haut-Batailley^{[*]}	Château Kirwan	Château Lagrange^{[a]}
Château Langoa Barton	Château Marquis d'Alesme Becker	Château Pontet-Canet^{[b]}
Château La Tour Carnet^{[a]}	Château Carbonnieux	Château de Fieuzal^{[a]}
Château Malartic-Lagravière^{[*]}	Château Smith Haut Lafitte	Château l'Angélus
Château Balestard-la-Tonnelle^{[*]}^{[a]}	Château Beauséjour-Duffau-Lagarrosse	Château Cadet-Piola^{[a]}
Château Canon-la-Gaffelière	Château La Clotte^{[a]}	Château Croque-Michotte
Château Curé-Bon-la-Madeleine	Château La Dominique^{[a]}	Château Larcis Ducasse
Château Larmande^{[a]}	Château Soutard^{[a]}	Château Troplong Mondot^{[a]}
Château Villemaurine	Château Beauregard	Château Certan-Giraud
Château Certan de May^{[b]}	Clos l'Église	Château l'Église-Clinet
Château Le Gay^{[a]}	Château Lagrange	Château La Pointe
Bons Crus
Château d'Agassac^{[a]}	Château d'Angludet^{[*]}	Château Beau-Site^{[a]}
Château Beau-Site Haut-Vignoble^{[a]}	Château Bel-Air-Marquis-d'Aligre^{[b]}	Château Belgrave
Château de Camensac^{[*]}^{[a]}	Château Citran^{[a]}	Château Cos Labory
Château Croizet Bages^{[*]}	Château Dauzac	Château Ferrière^{[b]}
Château Fourcas Dupré	Château Fourcas Hosten	Château Grand-Puy-Ducasse^{[b]}
Cru Gressier Grand Poujeaux	Château Hanteillan^{[a]}	Château Haut-Bages-Libéral
Château Labégorce^{[a]}	Château Labégorce Zédé^{[a]}	Château Lafon-Rochet^{[a]}
Château Lanessan	Château Lynch-Moussas	Château Marbuzet^{[a]}
Château Marquis de Terme	Château Maucaillou^{[a]}	Château Les Ormes-de-Pez
Château Pédesclaux^{[a]}	Château de Pez^{[*]}	Château Phélan Ségur
Château Pouget^{[a]}	Château Poujeaux	Château Saint-Pierre^{[*]}
Château Siran	Château du Tertre^{[a]}	Château La Tour de Mons^{[b]}
Château Villegeorge^{[a]}	Château Bouscaut	Château Larrivet-Haut-Brion^{[a]}
Château La Louvière^{[a]}	Château La Tour Haut-Brion^{[b]}	Château La Tour-Martillac^{[b]}
Château l'Arrosée^{[a]}	Château Bellevue^{[a]}	Château Cap de Mourlin
Domaine du Chatelet	Château Corbin (Giraud)	Château Corbin (Manuel)
Château Corbin Michotte	Château Coutet	Château Dassault^{[a]}
Château La Fleur-Pourret^{[a]}	Château Franc-Mayne^{[a]}	Château Grace-Dieue
Château Grand Barrail-Lamarzelle-Figeac	Château Grand Corbin	Château Grand Corbin-Despagne
Château Grand-Mayne^{[a]}	Château Grand Pontet^{[a]}	Clos des Jacobins
Couvent-des-Jacobins	Château Guadet-St. Julien^{[a]}	Château Laroque^{[a]}
Château Moulin-du-Cadet^{[a]}	Château Pavie-Decesse^{[a]}	Château Pavie-Macquin^{[a]}
Château Saint-Georges-Côte-Pavie	Château Tertre-Daugay^{[a]}	Château La Tour-Figeac^{[a]}
Château la Tour-du-Pin-Figeac	Château Trimoulet^{[a]}	Château Yon-Figeac^{[a]}
Château Bourgneuf-Vayron^{[a]}	Château La Cabanne^{[a]}	Château Le Caillou^{[a]}
Château Clinet^{[a]}	Clos du Clocher^{[a]}	Château La Croix
Château La Croix-de-Gay	Domaine de l'Église^{[a]}	Château l'Enclos^{[a]}
Château Gombaude-Guillot	Château La Grave^{[a]}	Trignant de Boisset^{[a]}
Château Guillot^{[a]}	Château Moulinet^{[a]}	Château Rouget
Clos René^{[*]}^{[a]}	Château de Sales	Château du Tailhas^{[a]}
Château Taillefer^{[a]}	Château Vraye-Croix-de-Gay^{[a]}	

﹡ Lichine notes, "These wines are considered better than their peers in this classification".
a Promoted a tier placement from 1966 to 1978.
b Relegated a tier placement from 1966 to 1978.

=== 1978 demotions ===
Château Capbern	Château Dutruch-Lambert	Château Paveil	
Château Baleau	Château Fonroque	Château Les Grandes Murailles	Château Ripeau
Château Feytit-Clinet	Château la Fleur-Porret	Château Mazeyres	
