= Lichine =

Lichine, a surname, may refer to:

People:

- Alexis Lichine, Russian/American wine writer, vintner and négociant
- David Lichine, Russian/American ballet dancer

Other:

- Château Prieuré-Lichine, Bordeaux wine estate still bearing the name of former owner Alexis Lichine
- Alexis Lichine's classification of Bordeaux wine, the Classification des Grands Crus Rouges de Bordeaux rating of Bordeaux estates
- Lichine (horse), a Thoroughbred racehorse
