= Cocks & Féret =

Bordeaux wine directory

Bordeaux et ses vins Bordeaux and Its Wines
- English seventeenth edition cover
- Author: Charles Cocks (1846) various
- Language: French/English
- Genre: Wine directory
- Publisher: Éditions Féret; John Wiley & Sons
- Publication date: September 2007 (French eighteenth edition); November 2004 (English seventeenth edition)
- Publication place: France/United Kingdom
- Media type: Print (hardcover)
- Pages: 2291/2336
- ISBN: 978-2-35156-013-6 (French); ISBN 978-0-7645-8336-0 (English)
- OCLC: 173671511

Cocks & Féret, or simply Féret, is the colloquial name of a Bordeaux wine directory originally created by Charles Cocks and Michel-Édouard Féret in 1846, which was published under the name Bordeaux, its Wines and the Claret Country and translated into French and published as the first edition of Bordeaux et ses vins in 1850. It is regarded as the classic reference work on Bordeaux wines, and is to date considered the most comprehensive information source on Bordeaux' wineries.

== History ==
Jean-Baptiste Féret founded the publishing house La Librairie Féret in Bordeaux in 1812, which became Féret et fils in 1841. In 1846 Michel-Édouard Féret approached Charles Cocks, an English schoolmaster and wine enthusiast living in Bordeaux since 1840, to publish a directory of wine aimed at his compatriots. At 84 pages containing historical observations and assessment of Bordeaux wine, Bordeaux, its Wines and the Claret Country was published in London that year.

It was not the first publication dealing solely with Bordeaux wines however, in many ways its forerunner is cited as Traite sur les vins du Medoc (1824) by William Franck.

A French translation was proposed by Féret, which led to Guide de l'étranger à Bordeaux et dans la Gironde. Bordeaux, ses environs et ses vins classés par ordre de mérite published in 1850, with further emphasis on classifying wines in order of merit. This directory would be considered the first edition of Bordeaux et ses Vins.

Charles Cocks died in 1854, while the second edition, Bordeaux et ses Vins 2ème édition, appeared in 1868, and the succession of publications provide a useful historical record of the evolution of different properties' and districts' reputations.

Revisions are published to date, usually referred to as "Le Féret", most recently with the 2007 edition of Bordeaux et ses Vins 18ème édition. The English language translations are titled Bordeaux and Its Wines, with the seventeenth edition published in 2004.

== Early classification ==
Nearly a decade before the Bordeaux Wine Official Classification of 1855, Cocks assessed Château Lafite, Château Latour, Château Margaux and Château Haut-Brion as First Growths, while ranking as Second Growths Château Mouton, Château Léoville (present day Château Léoville-Las Cases, Château Léoville-Poyferré and Château Léoville Barton) Château Rauzan (present day Château Rauzan-Ségla and Château Rauzan-Gassies), Château Durfort, Château Gruaud-Larose, Château Lascombes and Château Gorse (present day Château Brane-Cantenac).
