= Château Durfort-Vivens =

Winery in the Bordeaux region of France

Coordinates: 45.03990°N 0.67498°W

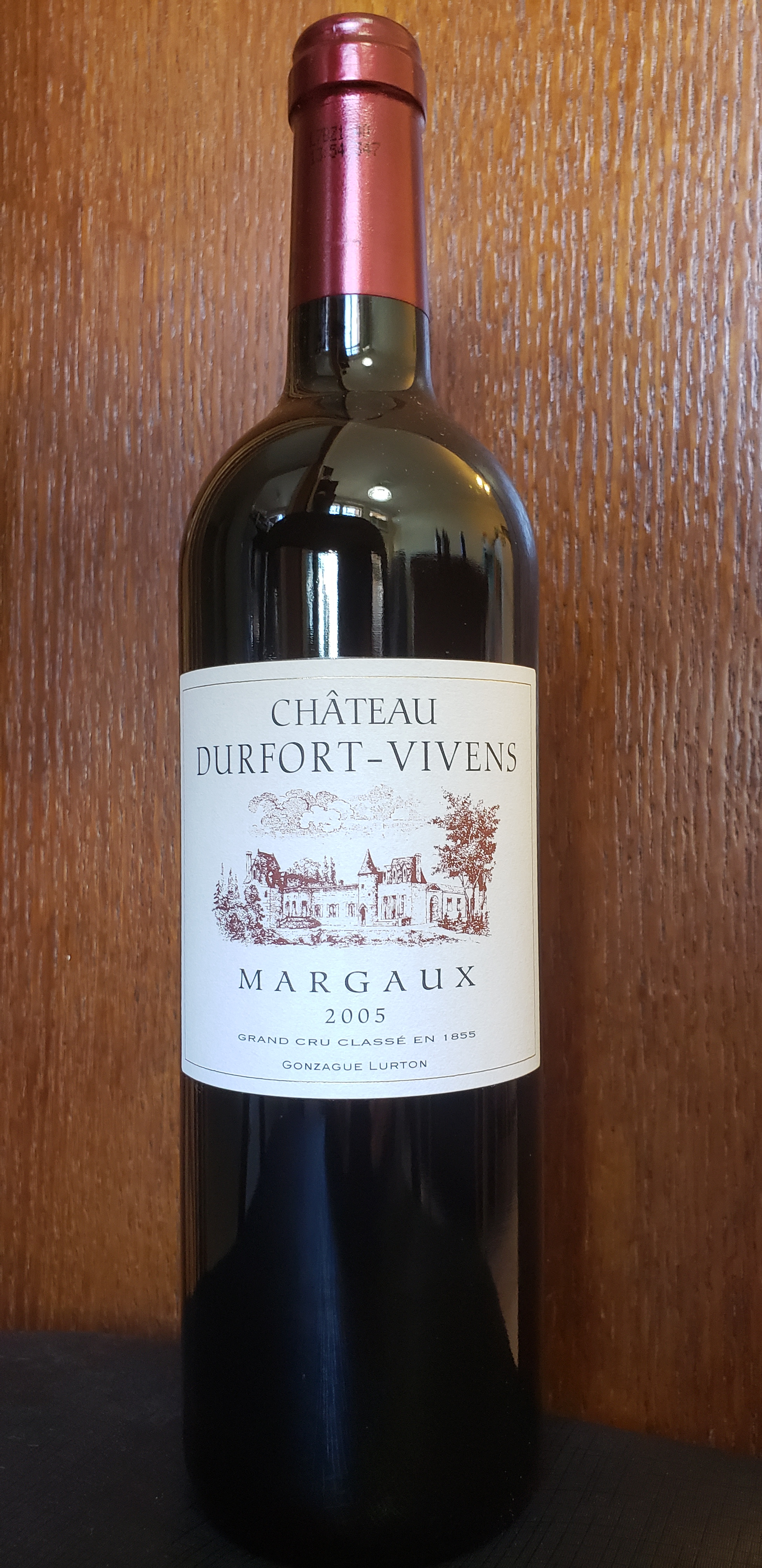
A bottle from the 2005 vintage

Château Durfort-Vivens is a winery in the Margaux appellation of the Bordeaux region of France. It is also the name of the red wine produced by this property. The wine produced here was classified as one of fifteen Deuxièmes Crus (Second Growths) in the original Bordeaux Wine Official Classification of 1855.

While the 1855 classification is still legally in effect, more modern classifications have been performed to reconcile changes over time. In The Liv-ex Bordeaux Classification, in which quality of Bordeaux red wine is determined by demand in terms of price, Château Durfort-Vivens is listed as a Fifth Growth. In Alexis Lichine's classification of Bordeaux wine, which is based on subjective criteria, it is a Grand Cru (Great Growth), putting it in the third group on his list.

== History ==
The Durfort property dates back to the 12th century having been owned by the influential Durfort de Duras family for seven centuries. The family also owned the nearby Château Lamothe, later renamed Château Margaux. The property was purchased in 1824 by M. de Vivens, and renamed Château Durfort Vivens.

In the 20th century, the château was purchased by local négociants, and in 1961 it was purchased by Château Margaux, which was controlled by the Lurton family, which also owns Château Brane-Cantenac and Château Climens. Until that time, the wine was produced at Château Margaux.

Lucien's son Gonzague Lurton, became the head of operations 1992.

== Vineyards and wine ==
The Chateau has 86.5 acres (350,000 m^{2}) planted with Cabernet Sauvignon, Merlot, and Cabernet Franc. A second wine is produced under the label Vivens.
