= Domaine Montrose =

Coordinates: 43.4302°N 3.3701°E

Domaine Montrose is a Côtes de Thongue appellation French wine estate founded in the South of France in 1701. It is named for its location on a volcano (mont) and the pink (rose) almond tree flowers that surround the vineyards. The vineyard is 100 hectares (1 km^{2}). Family owned since its founding in 1701, Bernard Coste represents the 11th family generation at the Domaine; his son Olivier joined him in 2009.

The Domaine's typical rosé wine blend is 65% grenache, 25% cabernet sauvignon, and 10% syrah. Its typical red wine blend is 35% merlot, 35% syrah, and 30% grenache. Its grand vin is Salamandre, of which only 7,000 bottles are produced per year; it is 60% cabernet sauvignon and 40% syrah.

== Wine criticism ==
Wine Enthusiast rated the Domaine Montrose 2013 Rosé at 87 points, and the Domaine Montrose 2016 Rosé at 86 points.

== See also ==
- The Liv-ex Bordeaux Classification
