= Château d'Angludet =

Coordinates: 45.01515°N 0.66120°W

Château d'Angludet or Château Angludet, is a Bordeaux wine estate in the appellation Margaux, in the commune of Cantenac on the left bank of the Gironde. The estate was classified a Cru Bourgeois Exceptionnel in 1932, and most recently a Cru Bourgeois Supérieur in 2003, in a classification which has been inactive since 2007.

The estate also produces a second wine, La Ferme d'Angludet, and a clairet named Clairet d'Angludet.

== History ==
The estate originates from the 12th Century at least, under the ownership of Chevalier Bernard d'Angludet when there was a manor house on the property. It came to a succession of owners such as the Donisan family, Rampnol de Corn, the Treulon family, the de Makanan family until it was confiscated in 1631 during the religious wars, and eventually passed to Pierre du Mons, by whose period viticulture had been established, and in the early 18th century the wine sold for a good price.

In 1776 d'Angludet was acquired by Pierre Legas and d'Angludet had come to be considered a fourth growth (in the tiers below the first growths), but with Legras' death in 1791, the property was divided among four sons who did not pursue a continuity of standards, and d'Angludet was not mentioned in any of the early classifications of the 1820s, nor in Cocks & Féret of 1846. Omitted for classification in Bordeaux Wine Official Classification of 1855, David Peppercorn describes the coverage in the 1874 Féret documents as "a melancholy state of affairs".

With two of the four portions bought by Paul Promis in the late 19th century, there was the start of a revival, under the name Domaine d'Angludet, and under Jules Jadouin in 1891 the former estate was reunited exactly a century after its division, eventually along with a reestablished reputation of excellence. Continuing under a succession of owners, the estate was ranked well at the 1932 Cru Bourgeois classification.

The property fell into a state of neglect following World War II, and was in ruins until 1961 when it was coincidentally noticed by Peter Sichel, a part owner of Château Palmer, while on an afternoon stroll, and the derelict direction of the property became reversed. Once acquired, the vineyards were completely restructured, and the property restored, eventually prompting Alexis Lichine to publish that d'Angludet deserved a higher classification which he incorporated into his Classification des Grands Crus Rouges de Bordeaux.

In 1989, Benjamin Sichel took over the management of the estate and continued production with a view to optimise the vines' natural balance. Of Maison Sichel, the family has owned a Bordeaux négociant business since 1883 and remains a significant shareholder in Château Palmer.

== Production ==
The vineyard area, situated next to the vineyards of Château du Tertre and Château Giscours, extends 32 hectares (79 acres) cultivated with the grape varieties of 55% Cabernet Sauvignon, 35% Merlot and 10% Petit Verdot.

Of the Grand vin Château d'Angludet there is typically produced 10,000 cases per year, and of the second wine La Ferme d'Angludet about 2,000 cases. There is also a clairet-style wine made from a saignée after the wines have been in vat for only a few hours, named Clairet d'Angludet.
