= Château Rouget =

Coordinates: 44.9369°N 0.2010°W

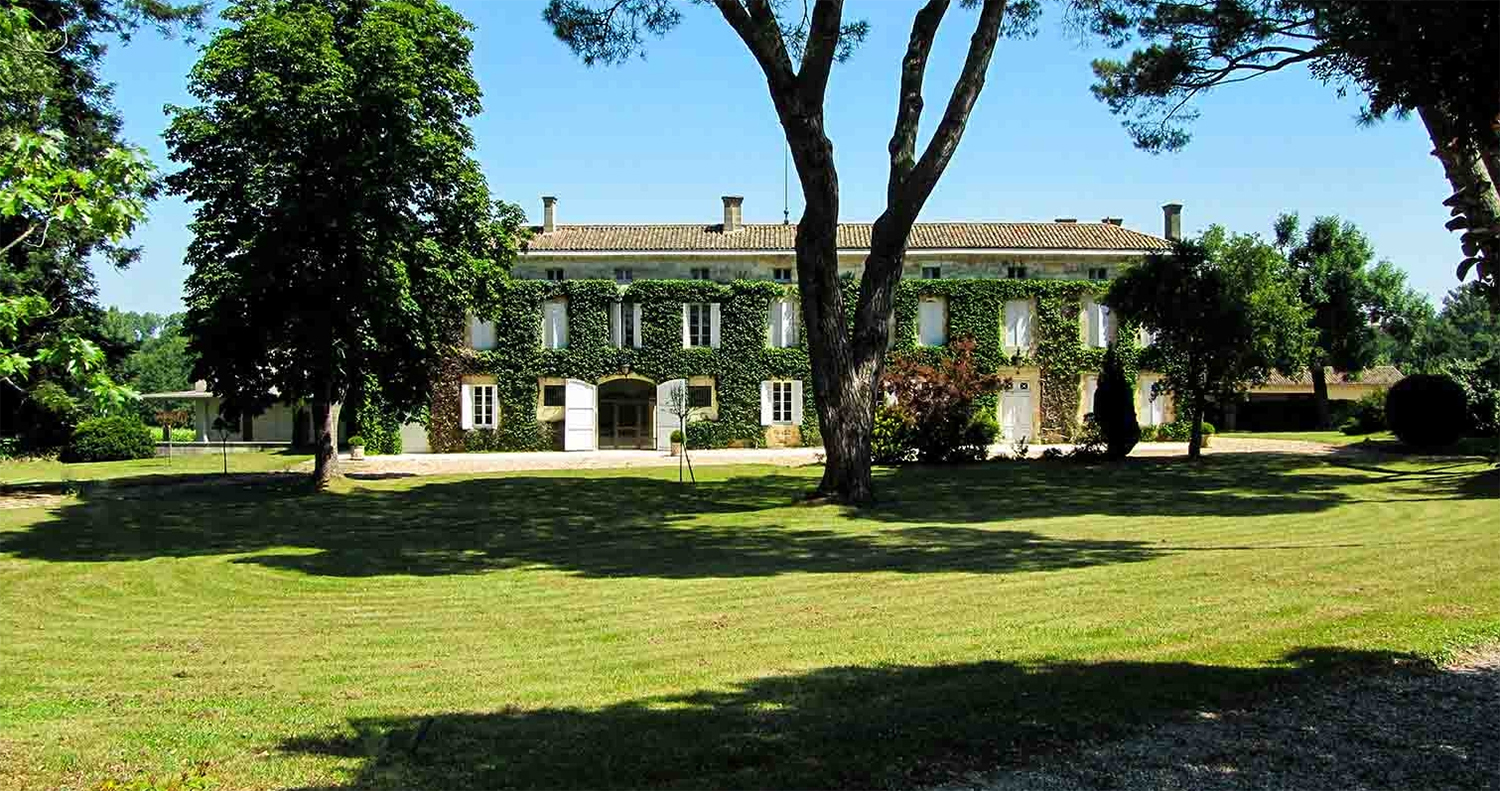
Château Rouget

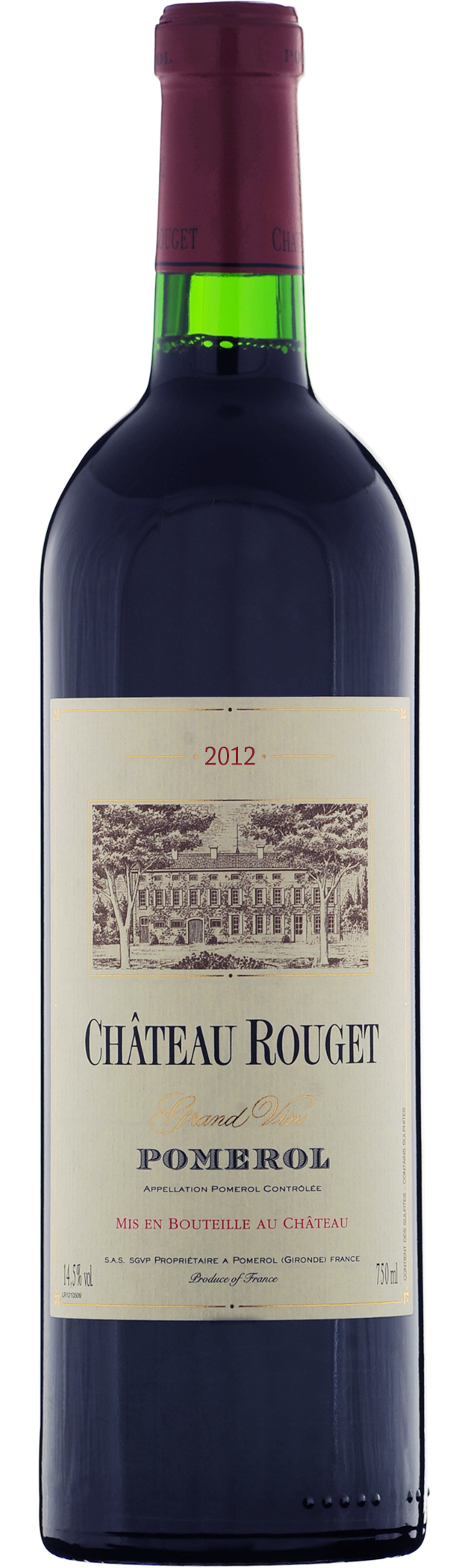

Château Rouget is a Bordeaux wine from the appellation Pomerol. The winery is located on the Right Bank of the Bordeaux wine region, in the commune of Pomerol in the department Gironde. As all wine produced in this appellation, Château Rouget is unclassified but the estate has been historically estimated among the great growths of the region. Rouget is situated adjacent to Château La Croix-de-Gay.

The estate also produces a second wine Clocher de Rouget.

== History ==
A leading estate according to early editions of Cocks & Féret, the estate belonged to the mayor of Pomerol in 1804. It was bought by Marcel Bertrand in 1925 who passed on management of the estate to his nephew François-Jean Brochet in 1974.

Rouget is currently owned by the Labruyere family, with consultancy by the oenologist Michel Rolland.

== Production ==
The vineyard area extends 18 hectares, with grape varieties of 85% Merlot and 15% Cabernet Franc. Rouget produces on average 6,500 cases per year.
