= Corinne Mentzelopoulos =

French-Greek businesswoman (born 1953)

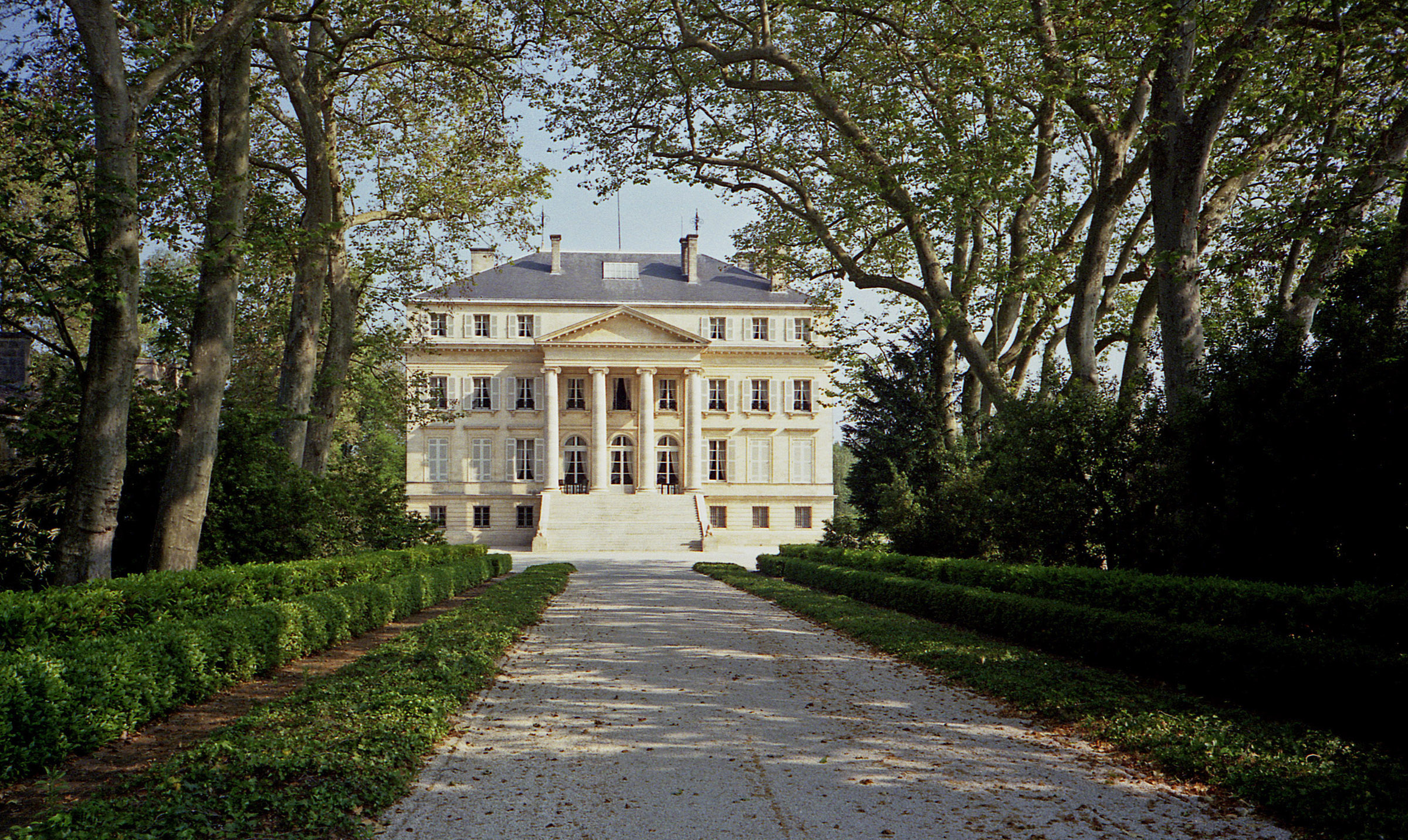
The Château Margaux estate owned by Corinne Mentzelopoulos

Corinne Mentzelopoulos-Petit (born 6 July 1953) is a French-Greek businesswoman who owns and runs the prestigious Bordeaux wine estate, Château Margaux. Her wines have often won Bordeaux's Wine of the Vintage. She has been cited as one of the leading women in the wine industry.

== Early life ==
Daughter of the successful Greek supermarket magnate Andreas Mentzelopoulos, Corinne Mentzelopoulos was born in Boulogne-Billancourt, just west of Paris. After graduating with a degree in classics, she attended the Institut d'études politiques de Paris (Institute of Political Studies in Paris) where she received her master's degree in 1979. Her only brother died at a young age leaving her the sole heir to the Château Margaux estate left by her father. She was proud of this inheritance and contributed to its further development.

== Career ==
After first working for the Havas advertising agency, Mentzelopoulos moved into the family business heading the Primistères holding company which controlled her father's Félix Potin retail grocery chain. In 1977, her father decided to move into the wine sector and purchased the Château Margaux estate (whose production of wine is dated to the 16th century) for 72 million francs ($16 million). On his death in 1980, his widow Laura and daughter Corinne Mentzelopoulos inherited the estate and proceeded to make substantial improvements to the winery. Corinne said of this, "At first we continued my father's work out of pride. We simply didn't have the right to let it fail." In 1990, the Agnelli group became the principal shareholder but in 2003, she gained ownership after buying up the Agnelli shares. Interviewed by Rose Hoare in 2012, she emphasized how she credited her father with her success: "I think he was a genius... His major coup [was] Château Margaux: it had been on sale for two years and he was the only one who realized what that name held."

At the time the Mentzelopoulos family bought Château Margaux, the vineyard's reputation had been tarnished by middling vintages, a scandal over labels, and low wine prices. To tackle these issues, Corinne initially worked with general manager Philippe Barré, and consultant oenologist Professor Emile Peynaud in managing the vineyard. Her 1990 appointment of Paul Pontallier as the replacement manager to Barré, whom he had worked under since 1983, turned out to be an inspired choice. Under his leadership, a new cellar was added, drainage was improved and a second underground cellar was created to accommodate second-year barrels. Paul Pontallier died in 2016. By 2012 the British architect Norman Foster had been commissioned to redesign and expand the cellars as well as to build a new winemaking hall and a library of vintages, the job was completed by 2015 and is open to scheduled visitation.

Mentzelopoulos runs the business from an office in Paris. Her business acumen can be judged by her increasing fortune. In 2012, she was deemed to be worth 600 million euro, up from some 300 million in 2004. Mentzelopoulos received the distinction of Officer of the Legion of Honor in 2012.

== Personal life ==
She is married to Hubert Leven, and has three children: Nathalie, Alexandra and Alexis. The two youngest, Alexandra and Alexis, joined Château Margaux in 2012 and 2020. In October 2023 both took over the business, his son Alexis with the CEO position and her daughter Alexandra with the position of President of the Supervisory Board of the holding company.

=== Philanthropy ===
For the Coffeeland Landmine Victims Trust, a Polus Center Project, in Nicaragua, Honduras, Colombia, Vietnam, Laos and Cambodia, a "Fine Wine Dinner" featuring the wines of Château Margaux was organized in which Mentzelopoulos of Château Margaux was the featured guest. Her donation for the cause was the Château Margaux wines from her own cellar in Bordeaux; the wines included Pavillon Blanc 2005, Pavillon Rouge 1995, Château Margaux 1999, Château Margaux 1996, Château Margaux 1989 plus Château d’Yquem 1999 and Dom Pérignon Champagne 1999. The dinner raised $100,000 for the trust.
