= Château Prieuré-Lichine =

Coordinates: 45.0290°N 0.6559°W

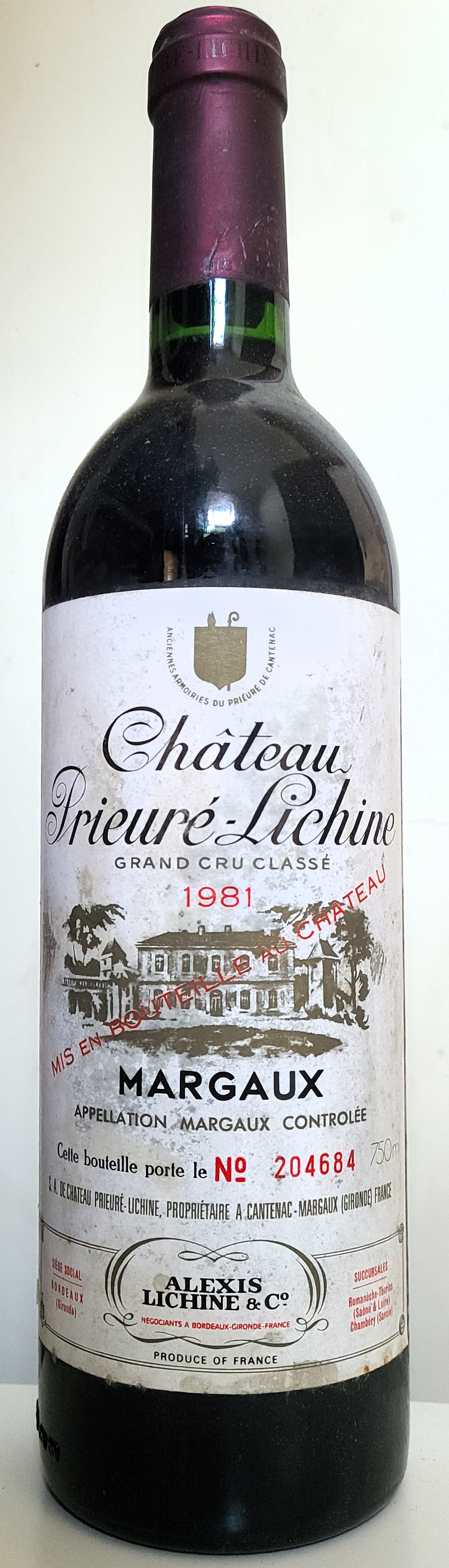
Grand Vin 1981

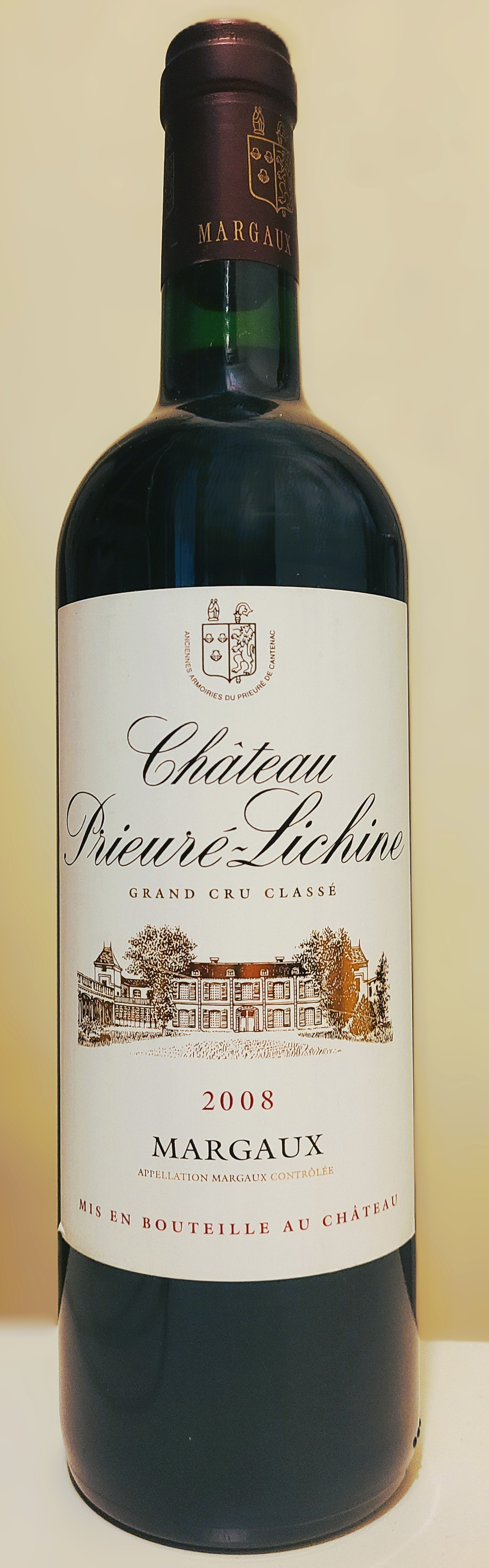
Grand Vin 2008

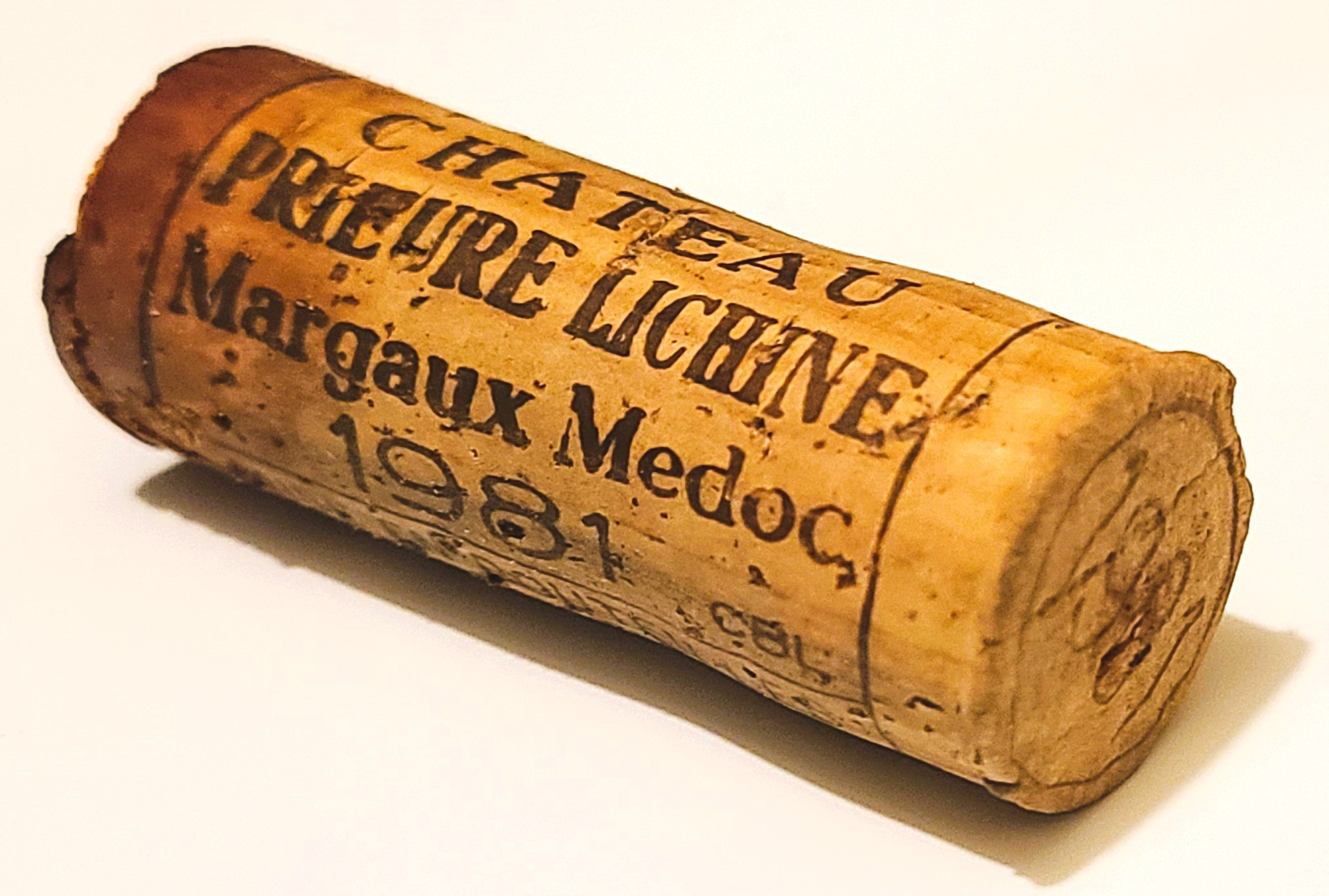
Cork

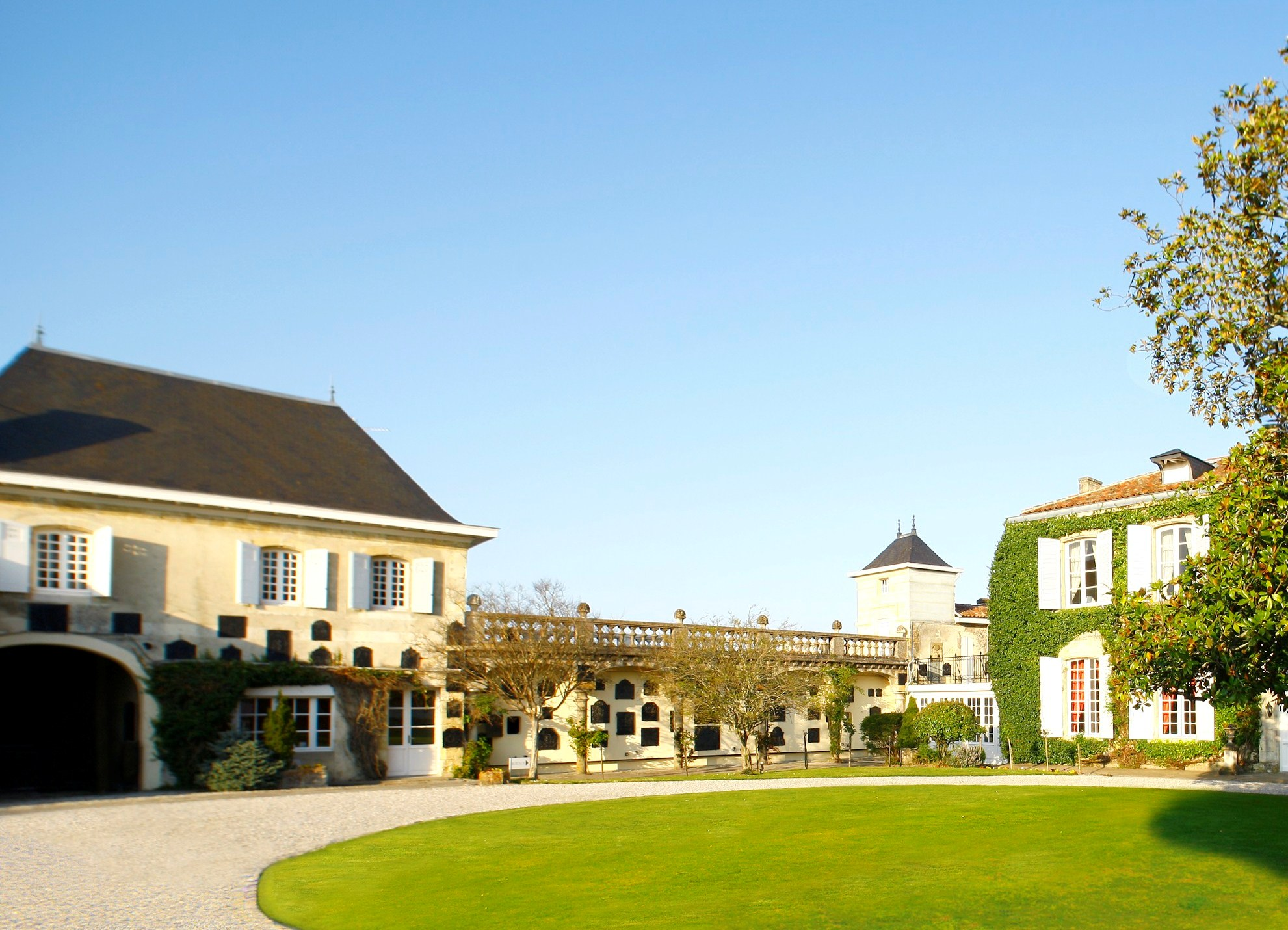
Château Prieure-Lichine

Château Prieuré-Lichine, previously Château Le Prieuré and Château Prieuré-Cantenac, is a winery in the Margaux appellation of the Bordeaux region of France, in the commune of Cantenac. The wine produced here was classified as one of ten Quatrièmes Crus (Fourth Growths) in the historic Bordeaux Wine Official Classification of 1855.

The Château produces a second wine under the label Château de Clairefont (also called Confidences de Prieuré-Lichine since 2008), and a Haut-Médoc, Le Clocher du Prieuré.

== History ==
Originally a priory of Benedictine monks who cultivated grapes for service at dinner and at religious ceremonies, practices gradually evolved by the 18th century to establish sales of the wine under the name Le Prieuré de Cantenac. As a consequence of the French Revolution, the property was seized, divided and sold in 1789 to several surrounding estates, including Château Palmer. A portion was bought by Monsieur Pagès who passed on the estate to his widow, when due to its reputation and broker prices received a fourth growth classification in 1855. Several changes in ownership resulted in changes to the name, such as Le Prieuré and Prieuré-Cantenac, and when the late wine writer and authority Alexis Lichine arrived to buy the estate it consisted of 11 hectares of neglected vines.

Alexis Lichine bought the vineyard in 1951 (shortly after having purchased the Margaux estate Château Lascombes with a consortium (Note: Lichine described the consortium simply as "the author and a group of American friends".)) and work began to group and reconstitute the property on the ideal slightly-rising ground. With the money he was garnering from the import business and a few partners, Alexis Lichine bought the Prieure for £11,000, at the time about $16,000. In 1953, with the help of Count Lur-Saluces of Château d'Yquem, Lichine renamed the Prieuré to Château Prieuré-Lichine.

With the estate renamed in 1953, the following year Cantenac wineries were entitled to use the appellation of Margaux. Sacrificing quantity for quality, trades in portions of desirable land at a loss of two to one were made with third growth neighbours Palmer, Ferrière, Kirwan, Giscours, Issan, Boyd-Cantenac and second growth neighbours Durfort-Vivens and Brane-Cantenac, adding up to 47 acres (19 ha) of vineyards by the mid-1960s. With an aim to produce a wine well beyond its classification, Lichine undertook extensive replanting, repairs and investments and brought in oenologists Emile Peynaud and Patrick Léon to advise on vat selection. By the 1970s the estate amounted to 58 hectares dispersed across the communes Cantenac and Margaux.

After Lichine's death in 1989, the estate was run by his son Sacha for several years, with oenologist Michel Rolland acting as consultant, until the estate was sold to the Groupe Ballande in 1999, for $28.8 million. The winery currently employs Stéphane Derenoncourt as its consulting oenologist.

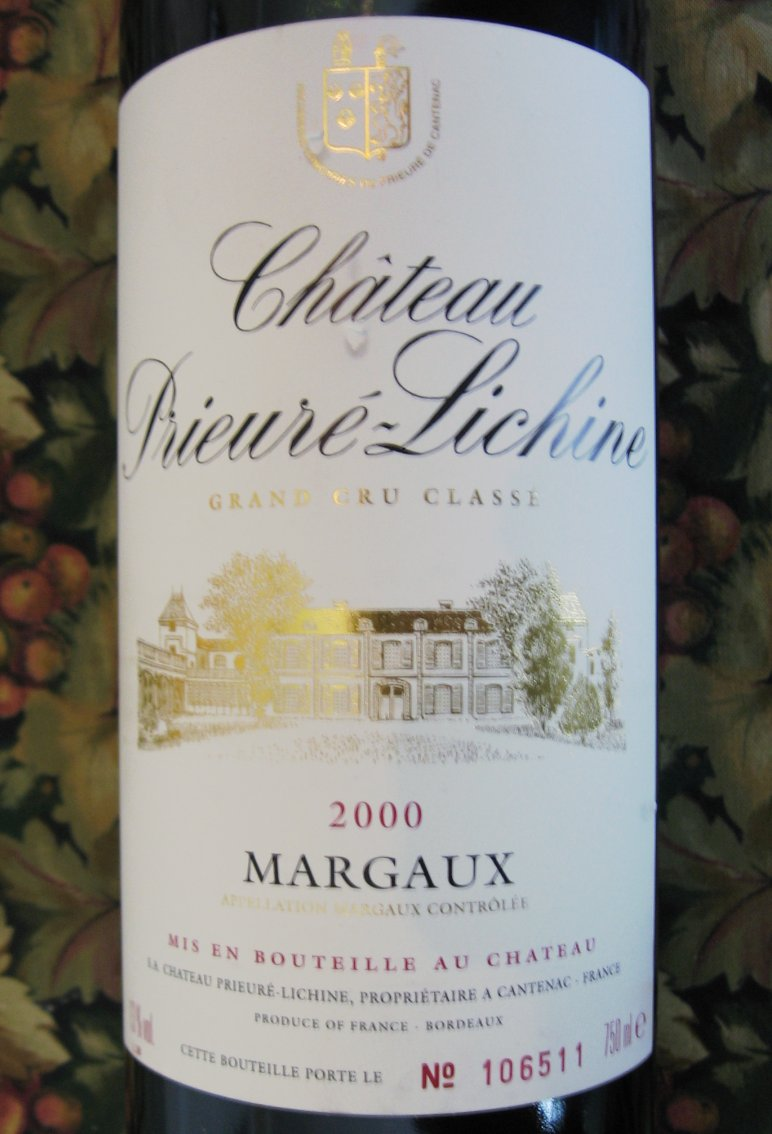
Château Prieuré-Lichine label from the 2000 vintage

== The vineyard ==
The soils of Château Prieuré-Lichine are essentially made up of gravel deposited by the river during successive glacial floods in the Quaternary era. Streams resulting from the floods then cut up these sedimentary soils into well drained mounds, which today look out over the Gironde estuary.

== Production ==
Château Prieuré-Lichine currently consists of about 77.5 hectares (192 acres) planted with 50% Cabernet Sauvignon, 45% Merlot, 5% Petit verdot. After fermenting in concrete vats, the wine is aged for up to 16 months in 50 percent new oak barrels.

== Technical improvements ==
Since 1999, many technical improvements have been adopted. The winery is now working with 34 concrete vats from 80 to 120 hectoliters allowing to improve the plot selection. The main vat room is equipped with a pneumatic pigeage machine, and the reception area has been modernized to allow gravity vatting.
