= Château Laroque =

Bordeaux winery

Coordinates: 44.8907°N 0.1194°W

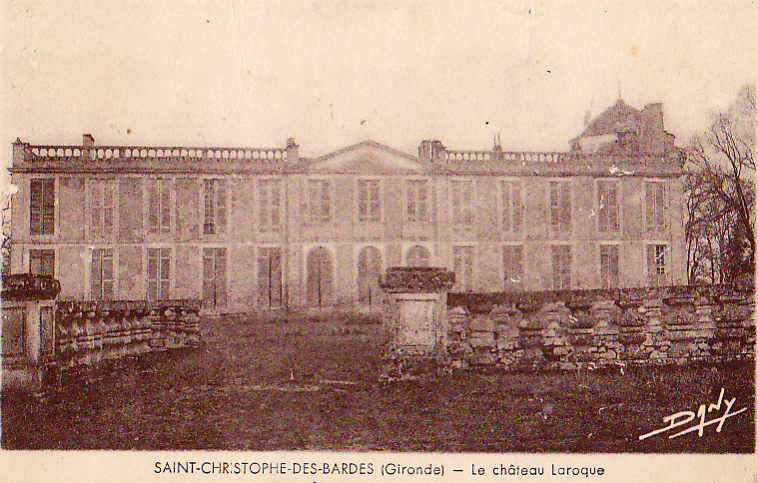
Old postcard of Château Laroque

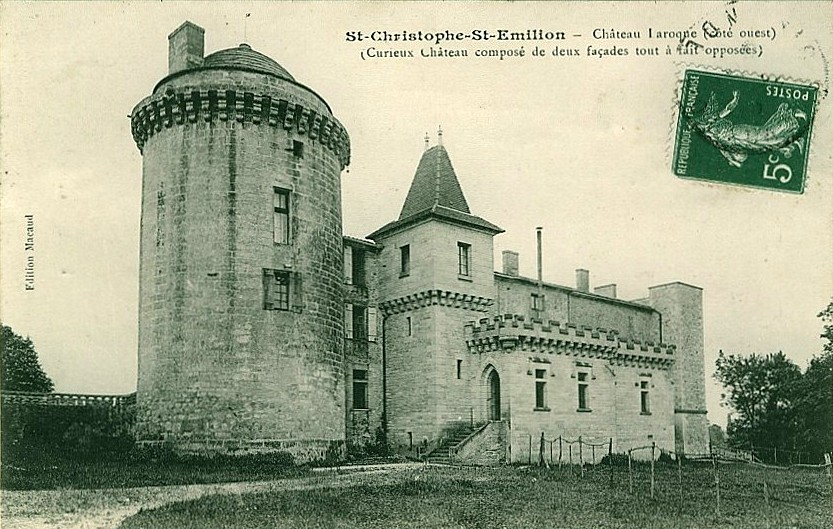
Old postcard of Château Laroque

Château Laroque (French pronunciation: [ʃato laʁɔk]) is a Bordeaux wine which has the appellation Saint-Émilion, ranked Grand cru classé in the Classification of Saint-Émilion wine. The winery is located in the Right Bank of France’s Bordeaux wine region in the department Gironde.

== History ==
Chateau Laroque dates back to the 12th century. The chateau itself was constructed in the 17th century and remains a backdrop for the manicured grounds. The vineyards were all replanted in 1962 and where inactive for sometime after the Great Depression.

== Production ==
The classified vineyard area extends 40 hectares, with the grape varieties of approximately 87% Merlot, 11% Cabernet Franc and 2% Cabernet Sauvignon.
