= Château Franc Mayne =

Coordinates: 44.8996°N 0.1712°W

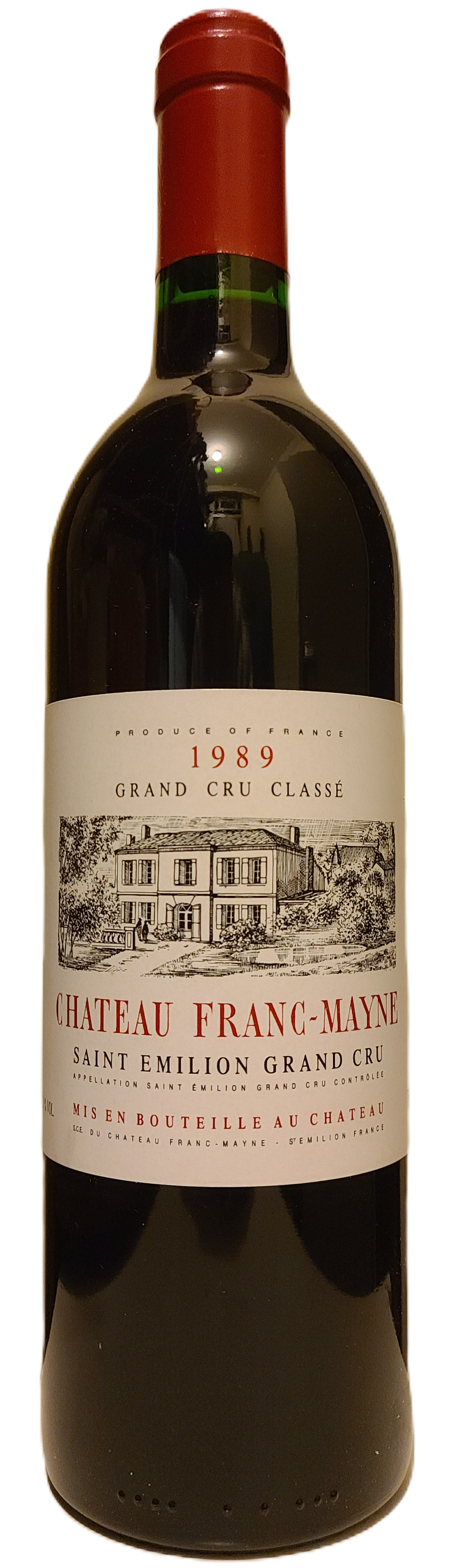
Grand Vin 1989

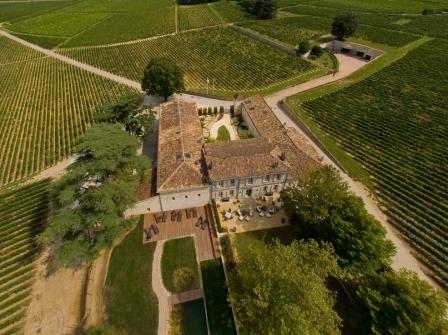
Château Franc Mayne

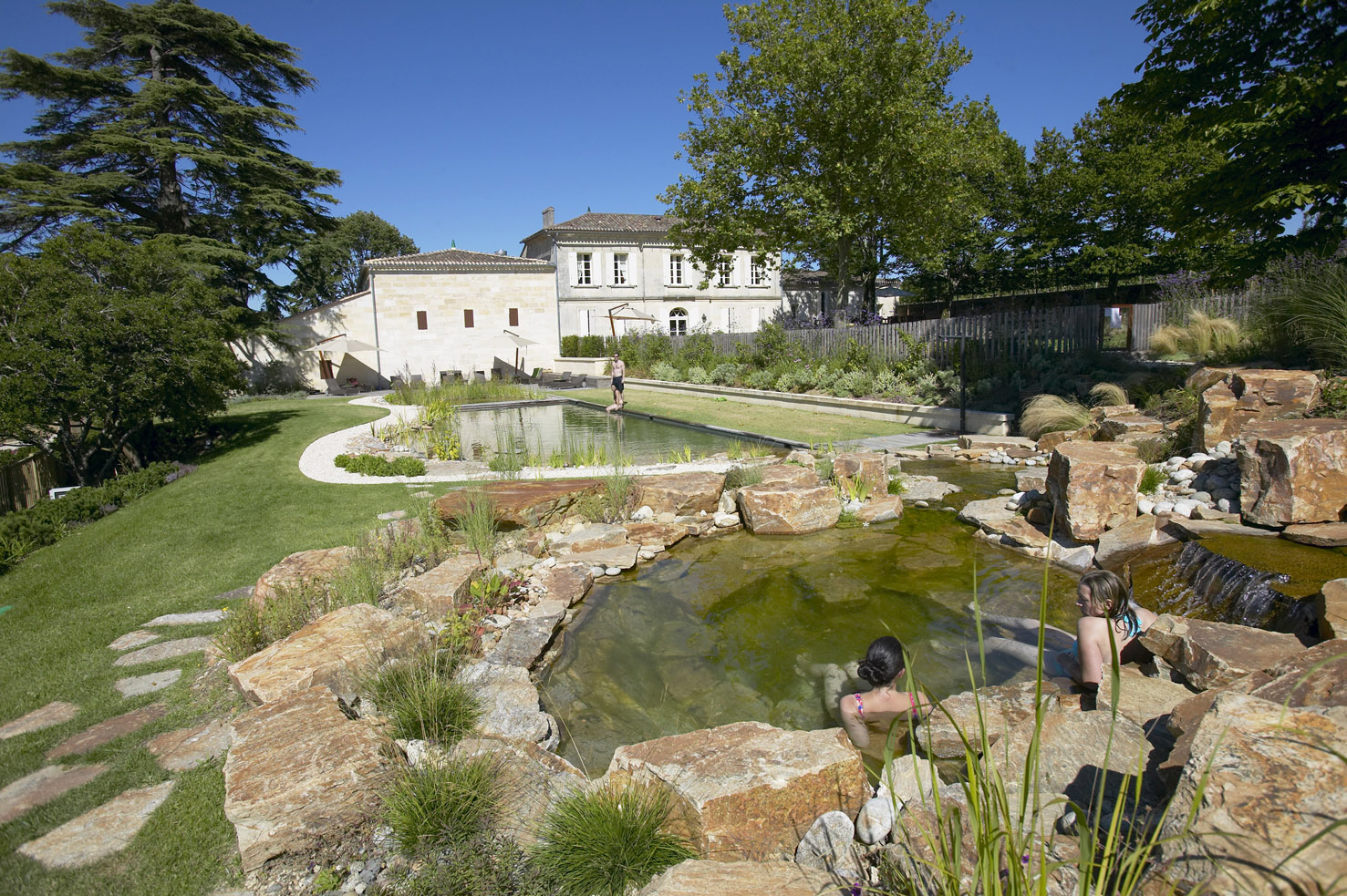
La Piscine naturelle

Château Franc Mayne is a Bordeaux wine from the Appellation d'origine contrôlée of Saint-Émilion, ranked Grand cru classé in the Classification of Saint-Émilion wine. The estate is located on the Right Bank of France's Bordeaux wine region, in the commune of Saint-Émilion and only a kilometre away from the medieval village. The main house is a typical 18th century "Maison girondine".

== History ==
Château Franc Mayne was bought by Axa-Millésimes in 1984 from the nephew of a Libourne négociant by the name of Theillasoubre, who had owned it for some years, and died with no descendants. In June 1996, the château was sold to a Belgian entrepreneur named Georgy Fourcroy.

Since 2005 Château Franc Mayne has been owned by Griet & Hervé Laviale. There have been major renovations both in the main house and the wine making facilities, with a new vat house containing wooden and stainless steel vats. The property also comprises 2 hectares of underground quarries.

== Production ==
As with most Saint-Émilion wines Franc Mayne is produced mostly from Merlot grapes. Yields are limited to 38 hl/ha, and the grapes are hand-picked, with successive sorting in the vineyard and in the winery (by Triebaie sorting machine). Malolactic fermentation takes place in new oak barrels.

Apart from its first wine Château Franc Mayne Grand Cru Classé, the estate also produces a second wine, Les Cèdres de Franc Mayne. It is produced from the same terroir as the Grand Vin but from younger vines, and is accessible at an earlier stage than Château Franc Mayne.

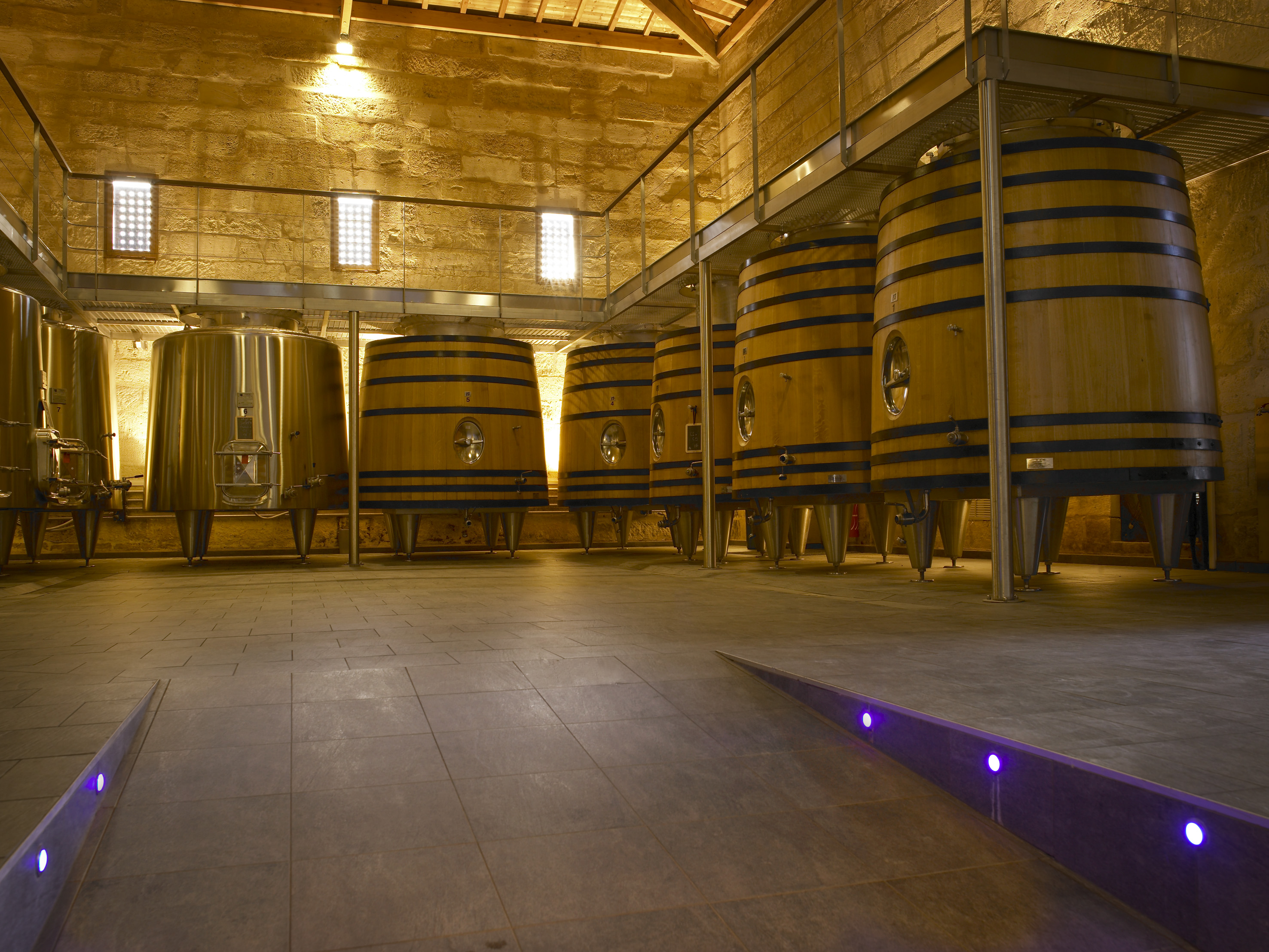
Vat room

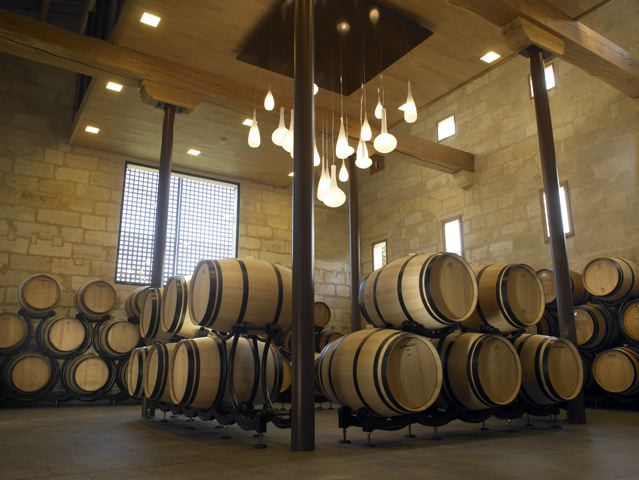
Barrel cellar

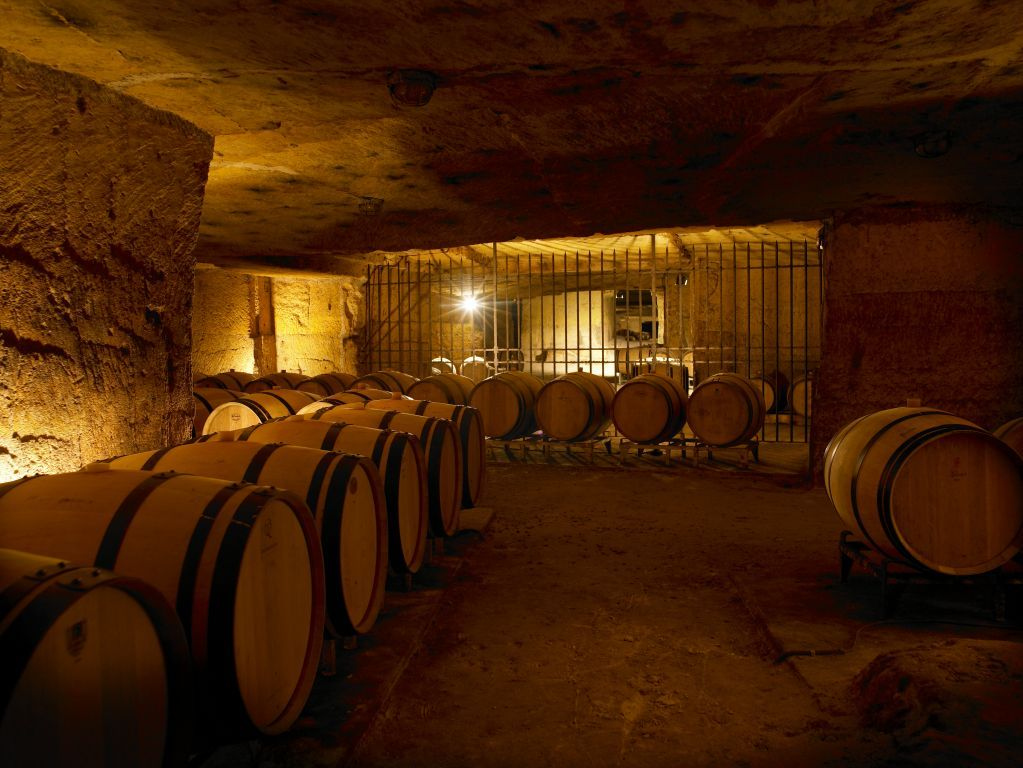
Old underground quarries
