= Château Feytit-Clinet =

Bordeaux winery in Pomerol, France

Château Feytit-Clinet is a Bordeaux wine from the appellation Pomerol. The winery is located on the Right Bank of the Bordeaux wine region, in the commune of Pomerol in the department Gironde. As all wine produced in this appellation, Château Feytit-Clinet is unclassified, but the estate is estimated among the great growths of the region.

== History ==
Since 1966 Feytit-Clinet was farmed and distributed by Établissements Jean-Pierre Moueix, but after a long-running legal dispute, the owners of the property, the Chasseuil family, regained control of the estate as of the 2000 vintage.

== Production ==
The vineyard area extends 6.5 hectares (16 acres), with a grape variety distribution of 90% Merlot and 10% Cabernet Franc.

The annual production averages 2,000 cases of the Grand vin Château Feytit-Clinet.
