= Alexis Lichine =

Russian wine writer and entrepreneur

- Born: December 3, 1913 Moscow, Russian Empire
- Died: June 1, 1989 (aged 75) Chateau Prieure-Lichine, Bordeaux, France
- Occupation: Wine writer, négociant, vintner
- Spouse: Countess Renée de Villeneuve (m. 1946; div. 1947) Gisèle Edenbourgh (m. 1956, divorced) Arlene Dahl (m. 1965; ann. 1967)

Alexis Lichine (December 3, 1913 – June 1, 1989) was a Russian wine writer and entrepreneur. He played a key role in promoting varietal labelling of wine, was a masterful salesman of wine, had interests in two Bordeaux wineries, owning Château Prieuré-Lichine in Margaux and a share of Château Lascombes in the Médoc. He was married to actress Arlene Dahl from 1965 until it was annulled two years later.

== Early life ==
Lichine was born in Moscow in 1913. His family fled to France during the Russian Revolution of 1917, going on to the United States in 1919. He studied economics at the University of Pennsylvania but dropped out because he felt he wasn't learning anything. In 1932 Lichine moved back to Paris and accepted a sales position with The New York Herald Tribune. In 1933 he continued in sales for The New York Herald Tribune in Algiers, and in 1934 moved back to New York as Prohibition ended.

== Career ==
Lechine attempted to start his own import wine company but failed, and in 1935 worked for the Cork and Bottle retail store in New York, and became a US citizen. He then went to work for Saccone and Speed, a New York wine importer, and in 1938 he was hired by wine merchant Frank Schoonmaker as his national sales manager.

At the outbreak of World War II, Lichine caught the last American ocean liner out of Bordeaux, the SS Manhattan. During the war he served in the United States Army Military Intelligence in Europe and North Africa, and was given the rank of Major by the commanding headquarters of the Delta Bar Section of the US Military Intelligence. He was discharged at Fort Dix, New Jersey on April 18, 1946. He was awarded the Order of Leopold, the Belgium Bronze Star and the World War II recognition from the French Legion of Honor.

On his return from the war, Lichine asked for full partnership in the company. Schoonmaker declined and Lichine left. In 1946 he went to work for the import wine division of United Distillers of America. In 1947 he purchased a cotton farm in Jacks Bay in St. Croix. The same year he married the Countess Renee de Villeneuve in New York. In July 1948 he was hired by Claude Philippe of the Waldorf Astoria New York hotel to buy wines in Europe for them. The same year he was divorced from the Countess. In 1949 Lechine hired Pierre de Wilde (from Château du Tertre) as his assistant wine buyer. In 1950 Lichine became the export manager for Château Haut-Brion. In 1955 Lichine founded Alexis Lichine Negociants in Long Island City, New York. He moved to Margaux in the Gironde to set up a shipping organization, Lichine & Cie., which became a leading exporter of first quality wines. In 1951 Lichine purchased Château Prieuré-Lichine and in 1952 also became part owner and manager of Château Lascombes. In the same year he started billboard advertising of his wine tasting room at the Prieure. This was the first time in the wine industry that professional wine tasting rooms were set up for the general public. In 1953 he purchased parcels in Latricieres in Chambertin and Bonnes Mares in Chambolle-Musigny. In 1956 Lichine married Gisèle Edenbourgh. Their first child Alexandra was born in 1957. Their second child Alexis Andrew Serge (Sacha) was born in 1960. Sacha went on to be a successful winemaker in his own right, as the creator of Whispering Angel.

In 1959 Lichine was a member of a committee that unsuccessfully launched a bid to revise the Bordeaux Wine Official Classification of 1855. Undeterred, Lichine published his own Classification des Grands Crus Rouges de Bordeaux in 1962 and made several revisions in the following years while campaigning for changes to a classification he contended was outdated. His efforts led him to be referred to as "the doyen of unofficial classification compilers".

Lichine served as an expert taster in the New York Wine Tasting of 1973. In 1987, Lichine was chosen the "Man of the Year" by the wine magazine Decanter.

=== Varietal labeling ===
Starting around 1940, Lichine and Schoonmaker promoted the idea that California producers should label their wines by the grape variety or varieties from which they were made. The standard practice among New World producers was to give their wines semi-generic labels. That is, they named them after the regions whose wines they resembled. For example, full-bodied red varieties might be labeled "Burgundy", whereas crisp whites might be labeled "Chablis".

California's Wente Vineyards was the first winery to adopt the practice. After calling its Sauvignon blanc by its varietal name rather than labeling it "Graves," Lichine and Schoonmaker found its sales volume to increase several-fold. More importantly, they were able to sell it in the important east coast U.S. market. Others, such as Robert Mondavi, soon adopted the practice, which has become the standard for New World (and, increasingly, some Old World) wines.

== Death ==
Lichine died of cancer at Château Prieuré-Lichine on June 1, 1989, aged 75. He was succeeded by his son Sacha (then aged 28), who later moved to Switzerland and sold Prieure-Lichine in August 1999.

== Legacy ==
In 2008, he was posthumously inducted into the Wine Writers' Hall of Fame by the Wine Media Guild of New York.

== Books ==
Lichine's writings included Wines of France (1951, revised 1955), Alexis Lichine's Guide to Wines and Vineyards of France (rev. 1989), co-author, Sam Perkins, and Alexis Lichine’s Encyclopedia of Wines and Spirits (1967, rev. 1987). The New York Times wine critic Frank J. Prial asserted that "Alexis Lichine, the Russian-American who loved France but hated the French, taught his adopted country to drink wine".

== See also ==
- French wine
- Bordeaux wine
- Semi-generic
- List of wine personalities
