= Château Brane-Cantenac =

Winery in the Bordeaux region of France

Coordinates: 45.02395°N 0.67370°W

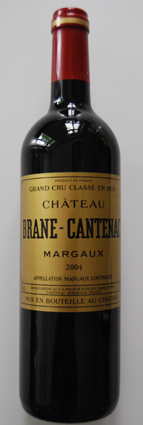

Château Brane-Cantenac is a winery in the Margaux appellation of the Bordeaux wine region of France. The wine produced here was classified as one of fifteen Deuxièmes Crus (Second Growths) in the original Bordeaux Wine Official Classification of 1855.

The estate also produces a second wine named Baron de Brane, a label named Château Notton, and a generic Margaux.

== History ==
Previously a reputed estate named Château Gorce (sometimes recorded as Gorse), its wine was sold at high prices and was listed as a second growth in pre-1855 classifications such as Cocks & Féret. It was acquired in 1833 by Baron Hector de Branne, termed the "Napoléon of the Vines", who named the estate after himself, a bold gesture for that period. Having once also owned the land that today is Château Mouton Rothschild, the sale of Château Brane-Mouton helped finance the purchase of this estate. With the Baron's total devotion to the vineyard, the wine was estimated to be the finest produced in Cantenac.

In the early 20th century the vineyard lost much of its reputation, and in 1922 it was acquired by the Lurton family. In 1992 control passed to Lucien Lurton's son, Henri Lurton; the same year, another of the family's properties, the Château Durfort-Vivens was passed to another of Lucien's sons, Gonzague.

In the past, Gustave Emmanuel Roy was one of the owner.

== Production ==
The vineyard abuts other Margaux châteaux, including Château Cantenac-Brown and Château Boyd-Cantenac, in separate lots totalling 94 hectares (230 acres). The grape varieties cultivated are 62.5% Cabernet Sauvignon, 33% Merlot, 4% Cabernet Franc and 0.5 Carmenère

Producing annually 30,000 cases, Brane-Cantenac makes in addition to its Grand vin, the second wine Baron de Brane, an additional label named Château Notton using grapes from the Notton vineyard, a plot acquired from Château d'Angludet, and a generic Margaux wine with grapes sourced from young vineyards.
