= Lurton =

Lurton is a surname. Notable people with the surname include:

- Lurton Blassingame (1904–1988), notable American literary agent
- André Lurton (1924–2019), French winemaker and winery owner
- Horace Harmon Lurton (1844–1914), American jurist and Justice of the Supreme Court of the United States

== See also ==
- Château Couhins-Lurton, Bordeaux wine from the Pessac-Léognan appellation
- Blurton
- Luton
