= The Liv-ex Classification =

The Liv-ex Classification is a classification of the wines of the world by the London International Vintners Exchange (Liv-ex), based on their average trade prices on Liv-ex.

The classification is inspired by the Bordeaux Wine Official Classification of 1855: it is based only on price, and consists of five tiers. Unlike the Bordeaux classification, it is updated regularly – every two years. The classification started in 2009, classifying only Bordeaux, but expanded in 2017 to include other regions, and is now international. It only includes wines that are transacted in sufficient quantity to be listed in the Liv-ex, thus excluding some small production cult wines.

== History ==
The classification was started in 2009 as The Liv-ex Bordeaux Classification, and ranked the wines of Left Bank Bordeaux solely on the price that each wine was worth at the time. Since then, the classification has expanded to reflect the changing conditions of the market for fine wine, and has been updated in 2011, 2013, 2015 and 2017. The latter extended beyond Bordeaux to include wines from the rest of the world for the first time. The 2019 classification was published in July 2019.

== Criteria and calculation ==
To construct the 2019 Liv-ex Classification, the following methodology was applied. In order to qualify for the ranking, a wine must have traded on Liv-ex between 30 April 2018 and 1 May 2019 in either a 75cl or 150cl bottle format. Standard in Bond, Standard En Primeur and Duty Paid trades were all considered, except for Burgundy, Champagne, Australia and the USA, where Special trades were also permitted.

Furthermore, four or more vintages of a wine must have traded on Liv-ex during this period in order to qualify. Once a wine qualified for inclusion in the rankings, the average trade price per 12x75cl was calculated by dividing the total value traded by the number of 9L cases traded (i.e the volume). The price bands are updated every two years to reflect the changing conditions of the market. The price bands for the Liv-ex Classification 2019 are as follows: 1st tier £2,877 - N/A; 2nd tier £792 - £2,876; 3rd tier £504 - £791; 4th tier £360 -£503; 5th tier £288 - £359.

== 2019 Highlights ==
Key findings:

- Wines from nine countries qualified, compared to six in 2017
- Pomerol estate Violette entered the rankings for the first time and placed in the 1st tier
- The introduction of still white wines to the methodology paved the way for a German Riesling to rank in the 2nd tier for the first time ever
- Burgundy accounted for 29% of the wines that qualified and 57% of those in the top tier

Using Bordeaux as the benchmark, but basing the prices on the real transactional activity of the world’s largest pool of fine wine merchants, the Liv-ex Classification of 2019 reflects the changing buying patterns of the trade today. You can read the full classification here.

== Background ==
Liv-ex, the London International Vintners Exchange, was founded in 2000 by two stockbrokers, James Miles and Justin Gibbs. It started with a group of 10 founding members in London, and a vision to make fine wine trading more transparent, efficient and safe. The founders believed that by creating an online exchange they could grow the size of the market for the benefit of Liv-ex’s merchant members and everyone with an interest in fine wine.
