= Château Haut-Brion =

French wine estate of Bordeaux wine

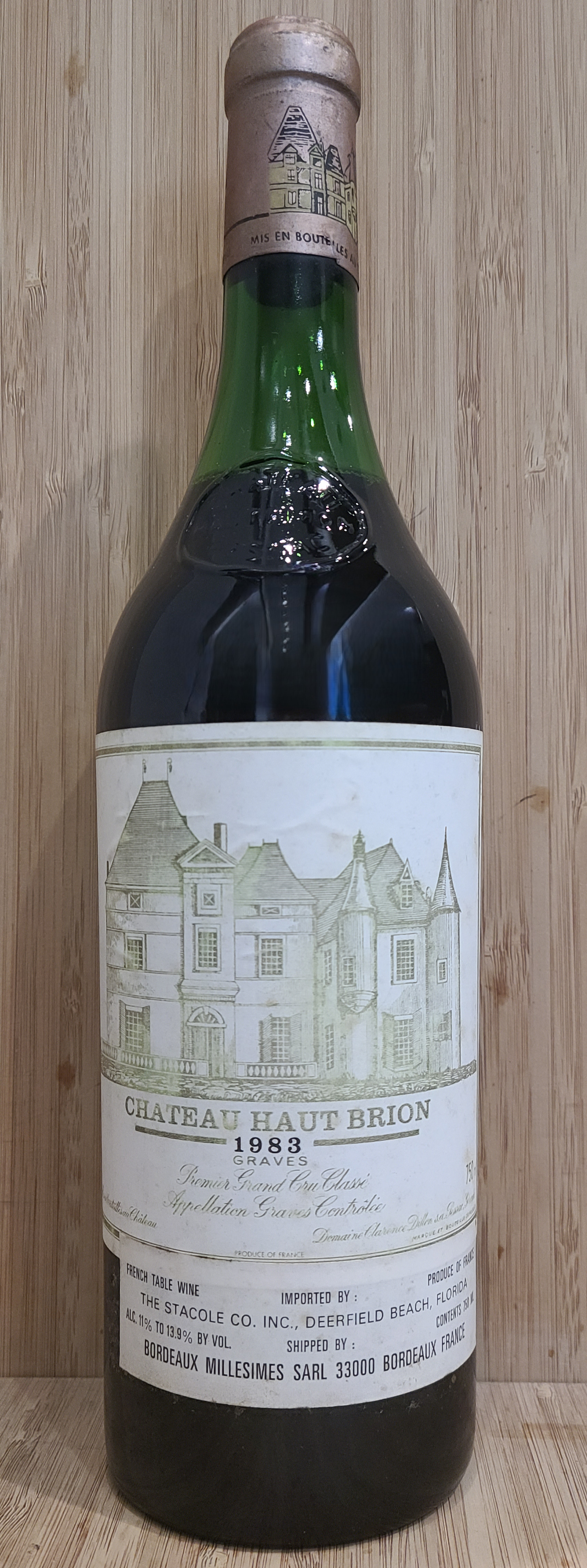
- Location: Pessac, Bordeaux, France
- Coordinates: 44.8167°N 0.6087°W
- First vines planted: 1423
- First vintage: 1525
- Parent company: Domaine Clarence Dillon
- Area cultivated: 127
- Known for: Château Haut-Brion
- Varietals: Merlot, Cabernet Sauvignon, Cabernet Franc, Petit Verdot, Semillon, Sauvignon Blanc
- Website: haut-brion.com

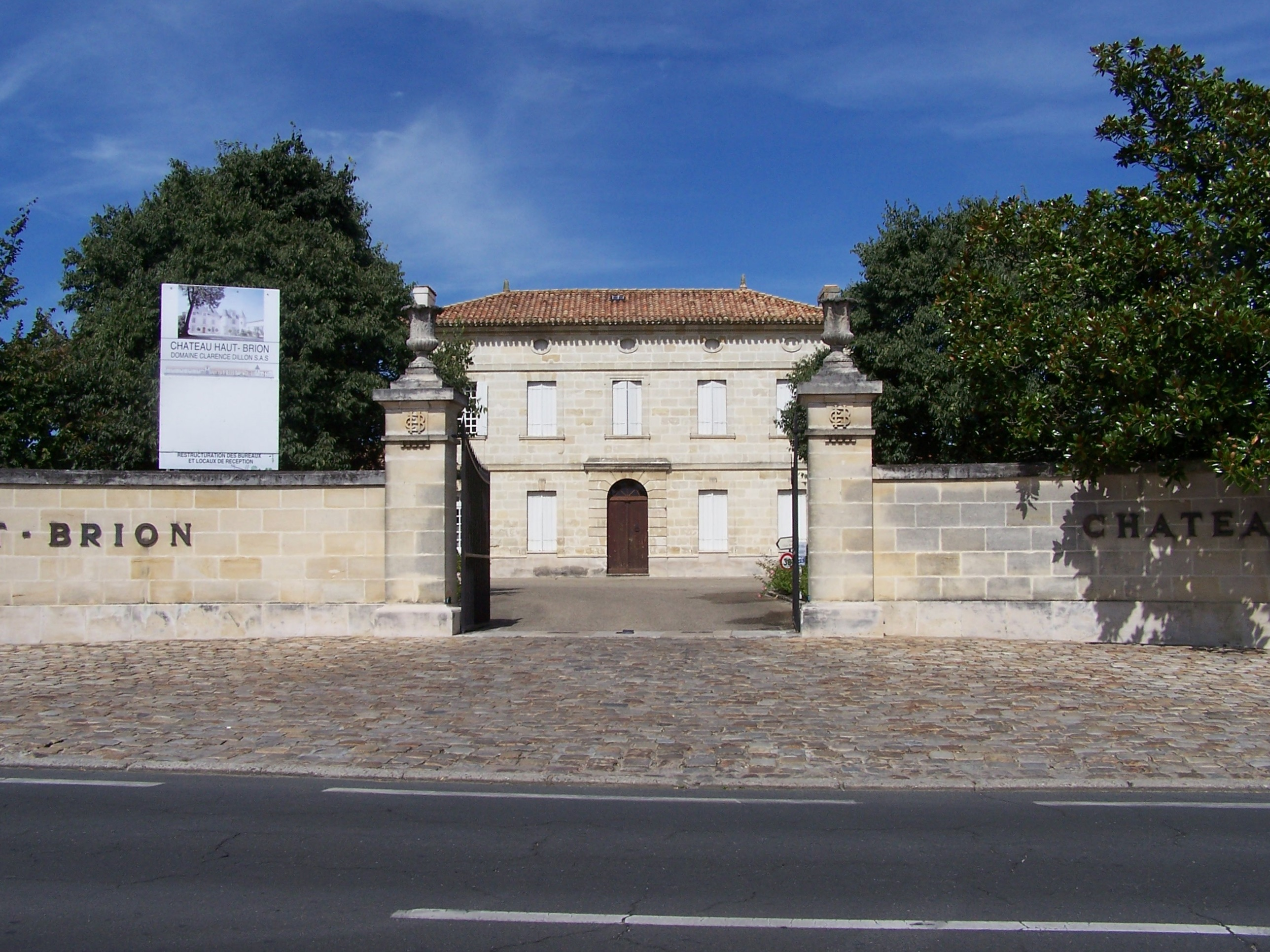
Château Haut-Brion

Château Haut-Brion (French: [ʃɑto obʁijɔ̃]) is a French wine estate of Bordeaux wine, rated a Premier Grand Cru Classé (First Growth), located in Pessac just outside the city of Bordeaux. It differs from the other wines on the list in its geographic location in the north of the wine-growing region of Graves. Of the five first growths, it is the only wine with the Pessac-Léognan appellation and is in some sense the ancestor of a classification that remains the benchmark to this day.

In addition to the grand vin (LWIN 1011247), Haut-Brion produces a red second wine. Formerly named Château Bahans Haut-Brion, beginning with the 2007 vintage, it was renamed Le Clarence de Haut Brion (LWIN 1008153). The vineyard also produces a dry white wine named Château Haut-Brion Blanc (LWIN 1017092), with a limited release of the second dry white wine, Les Plantiers du Haut-Brion, renamed La Clarté de Haut-Brion for the 2008 vintage.

== History ==
Although grapes are thought to have been grown on the property since Roman times, the earliest document indicating cultivation of a parcel of land dates from 1423. The property was bought by Jean de Ségur in 1509, and in 1525 was owned by Admiral Philippe de Chabot.

The estate Château Haut-Brion dates back to April 1525, when Jean de Pontac married Jeanne de Bellon, the daughter of the mayor of Libourne and seigneur of Hault-Brion.Her dowry was a portion of the Haut-Brion land. In 1533, Pontac acquired the manorial rights from Jean Duhalde, a Basque merchant. He expanded and renovated the estate, turning it into what it is today, the ancestor of the Bordeaux Grands Crus.

In 1649, Lord Arnaud III de Pontac became owner of Haut-Brion, and the wine's growing popularity began in earnest. The first records of Haut-Brion wine were found in the wine cellar ledger of the English King Charles II in 1660. During the years 1660 and 1661, 169 bottles of the "wine of Hobriono" were served at the king's court. Charles Ludington states: "The re-establishment of a royal court and of court culture generally required an increase in luxury goods. This demand inspired Pontac to launch the prototype of top-growth claret in London. The wine was called Haut-Brion, after the name of the estate from which it came."

Samuel Pepys wrote in his diary, having tasted the wine at Royal Oak Tavern on April 10, 1663, that he had "[drunk] a sort of French wine called Ho Bryen that hath a good and most particular taste I never met with". Pepys provided what Prof. Ludington called "the first tasting note of Haut-Brion".

Therefore, both Charles II's cellar book and Pepys' note "provide the first mention in any language of estate-named claret and are among the many proofs that Haut-Brion was created specifically for the English market." Pontac went even further in developing the renown of his wine: "By improving and "branding" a product, [...] he created and named a wine that came from a small, circumscribed area of land for the purpose of enhancing its value in the minds and on the palates of discerning English customers."

The original diary of Pepys is held in the Pepys Library at Magdalene College, Cambridge, while the 1660 Cellar Book of King Charles II is held by the British National Archives. In 1927, writer Dorothy L. Sayers, in her novel Unnatural Death, had detective Lord Peter Wimsey joke about Pepys Anglicizing the wine's name (" . . . a bottle of what Pepys calls Ho Bryon"). In April 2013, Magdalene College displayed the Pepys Diary opened at the page of the Haut-Brion mention for the 350th Anniversary of this historical mention. Dr Jane Hughes lectured on Pepys and wine before the gala dinner hosted by the Cambridge University Wine Society and featuring tributes to Pepys. Prince Robert of Luxembourg then challenged wine historians and amateurs to find a new reference to Haut-Brion in history prior to 1660.

In 1666, after the Great Fire of London, the son, François-Auguste, opened a tavern in London called "L'Enseigne de Pontac", or the "Sign of Pontac's Head", which was according to André Simon, London's first fashionable eating-house. Jonathan Swift "found the wine dear at seven shillings a flagon".

By the end of the 17th century the estate amounted to 264 hectares (650 acres) of which some 38 hectares (94 acres) were under vine. The wine was often sold under the name Pontac, though since the Pontac family owned numerous wine estates that could use the name, it is often impossible to tell when a wine came from Haut-Brion. Sometimes also spelled Pontack, another Pontac estate at Blanquefort which produced white wine would also often go by this name.

English philosopher John Locke, visiting Bordeaux in 1677, said of Haut-Brion, "The wine of Pontac, so revered in England, is made on a little rise of ground, lieing^{[sic]} open most to the west. It is noe thing but pure white sand, mixed with a little gravel. One would imagin it scarce fit to beare anything." On the cause of its increasing costliness, he said it was "thanks to the rich English who sent orders that it was to be got for them at any price". The German philosopher Hegel was also enchanted with the wine of Pontac, though it is unknown if his orders were for other de Pontac wines of Saint-Estèphe.

With the death of François-Auguste de Pontac, François-Joseph de Fumel, a nephew by marriage, inherited two-thirds of Haut-Brion with a third coming to Louis-Arnaud Le Comte, Lord Captal of Latresne. The de Fumel family also at one point owned Château Margaux.

In 1787, Thomas Jefferson, then American minister to France, came to Bordeaux. On May 25 he visited Haut-Brion and described the terroir: "The soil of Haut-Brion, which I examined in great detail, is made up of sand, in which there is near as much round gravel or small stone and a very little loam like the soils of the Médoc". His notes placed Haut-Brion among the four estates of first quality, with the entry, "3. Haut-Brion, two-thirds of which belong to the Count de Fumel who sold the harvest to a merchant called Barton. The other third belongs to the Count of Toulouse; in all, the château produces 75 barrels." Haut-Brion became the first recorded first growth wine to be imported to the United States, when Jefferson purchased six cases during the travels and had them sent back to his estate in Virginia, as stated in his letter to his brother-in-law Francis Eppes on May 26, 1787: "[...] I cannot deny myself the pleasure of asking you to participate of a parcel of wine I have been chusing for myself. I do it the rather as it will furnish you a specimen of what is the very best Bourdeaux wine. It is of the vineyard of Obrion, one of the four established as the very best, and it is of the vintage of 1784 [...]."

As a consequence of the French Revolution, in July 1794 Joseph de Fumel was guillotined, and his holdings were divided. Posthumously, de Fumel's nephews obtained a pardon for him as well as the restitution of the confiscated property, but they left France. In 1801, they sold Haut-Brion to Talleyrand, Prince of Benevento, owner of Haut-Brion for three years.

A less prosperous period followed between 1804 and 1836 under successive ownership of various businessmen, until Joseph-Eugène Larrieu bought Haut-Brion when it was sold by auction. In 1841, by buying the Chai-Neuf building from the Marquis de Catellan, he brought the estate back to the former size of the estate up until the death of François-Auguste de Pontac in 1694. Larrieu's family owned Haut-Brion until 1923.

In the classifications of 1855 ahead of the International Exhibition in Paris, Château Haut-Brion was classified Premier Grand Cru, as the only estate from Graves among the three established First Growths of the Médoc. The prices of Haut-Brion in the 19th century were consistently higher than those of any other Bordeaux wine. This trend has continued into the present day, with the price of the estate's grand vin averaging $571.

=== Modern history ===
Château Haut-Brion presentation card dated 1931, demonstrating the designs of the early 20th century, the label, cork, case and capsule markings

After a series of unsuccessful owners during difficult times, the American banker Clarence Dillon bought Château Haut-Brion on May 13, 1935, for ₣2,300,000. Several unverified anecdotes surround the acquisition, as Dillon was believed to also consider buying châteaux Cheval Blanc, Ausone or a majority share in Margaux, but did not care to make the trip on a rainy, chilly day, and chose Haut-Brion for its proximity to Bordeaux and riding facilities. One account claims Dillon never got out of the car.

Dillon made his nephew Seymour Weller president of the new company "Société Vinicole de la Gironde" (later Domaine Clarence Dillon S.A.S.), who held the position for five decades. Weller restored the park, cleaned the chais, and installed electricity along with new vinification equipment. He retained Georges Delmas, the régisseur and director of Haut-Brion since 1921, and former manager of Cos d'Estournel.

Haut-Brion first began using its distinctive bottle, emulating designs of old decanter models, from the 1958 vintage which was released in 1960.

Georges Delmas retired in 1961, and was succeeded by his son Jean-Bernard Delmas, born at the estate, instigating a number of renovations. In the 1960s, Haut-Brion was the first of the great growths to innovate with new stainless steel fermentation vats. Clonal selection research was begun in 1972, in collaboration with INRA and the Chambre d'Agriculture. Insisting that great wine cannot be made with only one clone, Jean-Bernard Delmas has stated, "You need an assemblage of excellent clones", adding, "We know where each plant is located". At Haut-Brion, each hectare contains 10 to 15 different clonal selections.

in 1975, at the age of 83, Seymour Weller retired as President of the company. His cousin's daughter (and granddaughter of Clarence Dillon) Joan Dillon, then Princesse Charles de Luxembourg and later Duchesse de Mouchy, replaced him. In 1976, the 1970 vintage of Haut-Brion ranked fourth among the ten French and California red wines in the historic "Judgment of Paris" wine competition.

The fierce competition that had existed between Haut-Brion and Château La Mission Haut-Brion over several years, which rose to a peak in the 1970s and early 1980s, ended when Domaine Clarence Dillon acquired La Mission in 1983.

From the 2007 vintage, in connection with the 75th anniversary of Dillon family ownership, the red second wine Château Bahans Haut-Brion was released under the new name Le Clarence de Haut-Brion. The name Château Bahans Haut-Brion had been in use for at least a century, and over a period it was sold without a declared vintage. Starting with the 2009 vintage, the white second wine Les Plantiers du Haut-Brion was renamed La Clarté de Haut-Brion.

Manager Jean-Bernard Delmas retired in 2003, and was succeeded by his son Jean-Philippe Delmas. Prince Robert of Luxembourg (son of Prince Charles of Luxembourg) who has acted as an administrator at Haut-Brion since the age of 18, became in 2008 Président Directeur Général of Domaine Clarence Dillon.

== Production ==
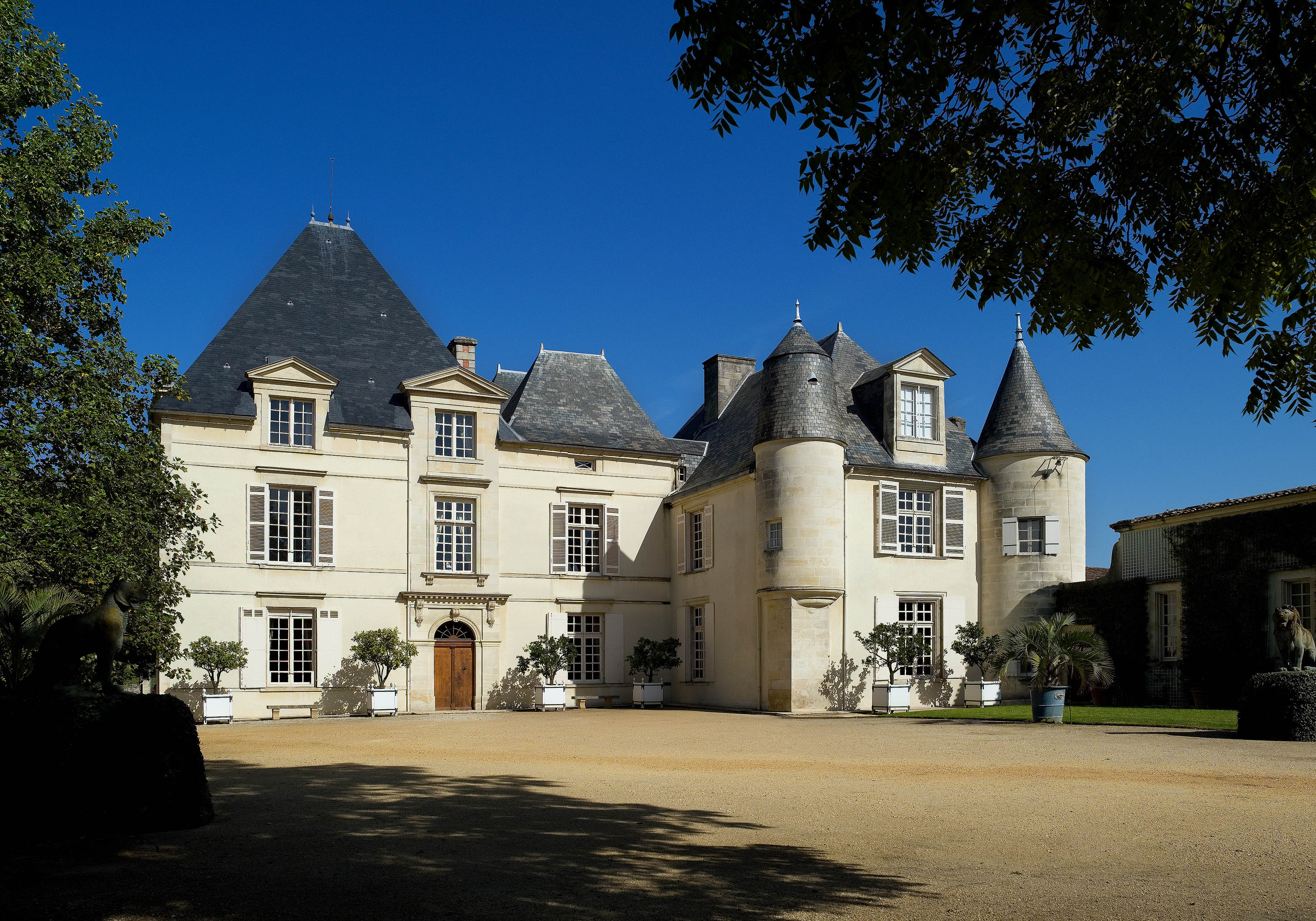
Château Haut-Brion

Château Haut-Brion devotes 48.35 hectares (119.5 acres) to red grape varieties, with a distribution of 45.4% Merlot, 43.9% Cabernet Sauvignon, 9.7% Cabernet Franc and 1% Petit Verdot, and 2.87 ha (7.1 acres) to white grape varieties, distributed with 52.6% Sémillon and 47.4% Sauvignon blanc.

The vineyards are elevated, up to 27 meters, somewhat above the Bordeaux norm. The soil consists of Günzian gravel and some parcels have high contents of clay. All the vineyards are located in a cluster near the château itself and on the other side of the main road.

The selection of optimum rootstocks and clones has been a large task at Château Haut-Brion, pioneered by Jean-Bernard Delmas, which has greatly contributed to the quality of the plant material in the vineyard. The long-term aim has been to lower yields, not by green-harvesting but by ensuring healthy and balanced vines. The average age of the vines is approximately 35 years with the oldest parcels dating back to the 1930s, planted with an average vine density of 8000 vines/ha.

Harvesting takes place by hand and each parcel is worked by the same team of workers to increase the teams' familiarity with the individual vines. The harvest of the white grapes takes place very early due to the proximity to the city of Bordeaux which results in a warmer microclimate and thus earlier ripening. The red grapes are picked as late as possible, sorted and then pneumatically pressed in whole bunches. There is no skin contact and fermentation takes place in oak barrels with indigenous yeast. After sorting in the field, the red grapes are destemmed, crushed and moved to a special double-tank with fermentation taking place in the top and malolactic fermentation in the bottom, using gravity to move the wine. Previously ageing took place in 100% new oak casks lasting 18 months. This has been reduced to 35% new casks and wine destined for the second wine Le Clarence is aged in 25% new oak. The white wine is aged in 40-45% new oak for 10–12 months. Château Haut-Brion has its own cooperage.

The annual production ranges from 10,000 to 12,000 cases (900 to 1,080 hL) of the red grand vin Château Haut-Brion, and from 650 to 850 cases (59 to 76 hL) of Château Haut-Brion Blanc. Of the second wines, the red Le Clarence de Haut-Brion previously named Château Bahans Haut-Brion, has a production of 5,000 to 7,000 cases (450 to 630 hL), and the white La Clarté de Haut-Brion, previously named Les Plantiers du Haut-Brion, has a production of 1,000 to 1,200 cases (90 to 108 hL).
