= Château Lascombes =

Winery in the Bordeaux region of France

Coordinates: 45.04145°N 0.68376°W

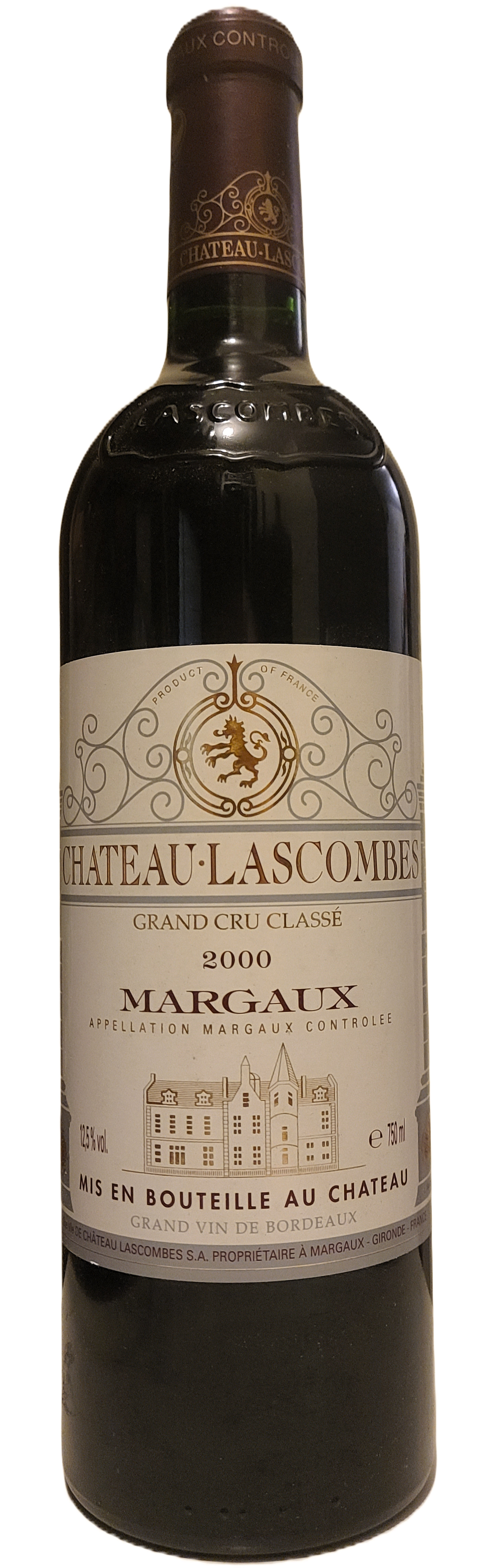
Grand Vin 2000

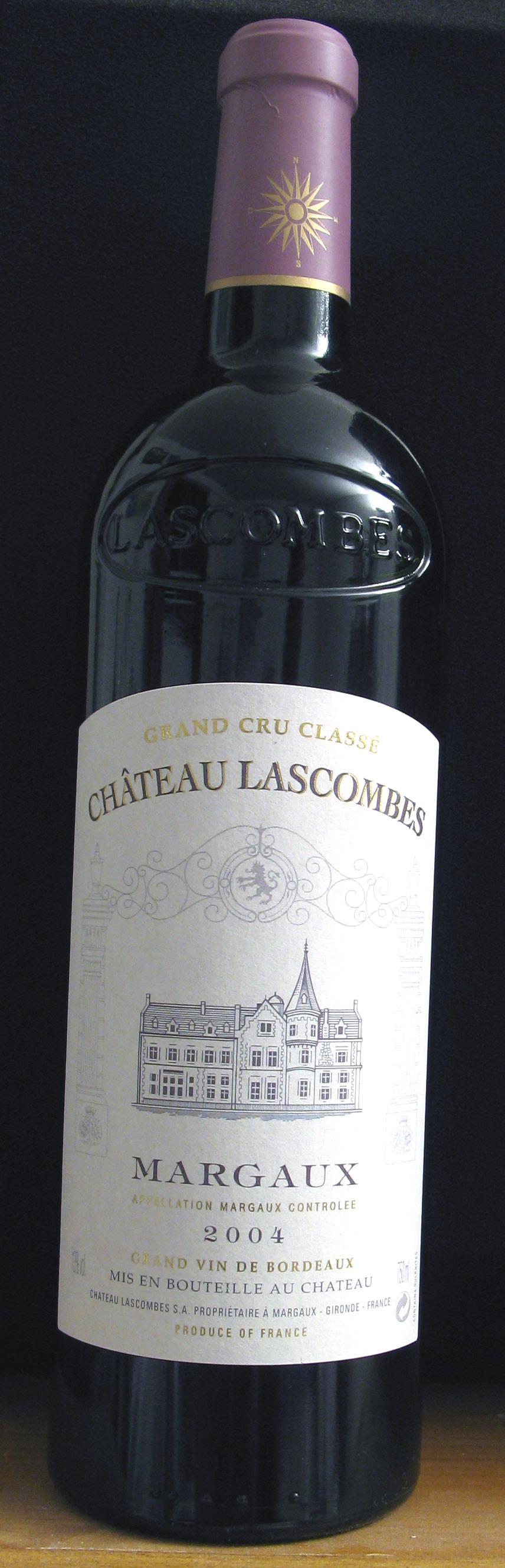
Grand Vin 2004

Château Lascombes is a winery in the Margaux appellation of the Bordeaux region of France. The wine produced here was classified as one of fifteen Seconds Crus (Second Growths) in the original Bordeaux Wine Official Classification of 1855. In the 1950s, the estate was purchased by French wine writer Alexis Lichine who continued to own part of the estate till 1971 when Bass Charrington took over principal ownership. In 2001 it was purchased by Yves Vatelot and US-based Colony Capital, who in 2011 sold it to the French insurance group MACSF. In addition to its premier cuvee, a second wine is also produced, under the name Chevalier de Lascombes. Additional brands are Château Segonnes, Rosé de Lascombes, Vin Sec Chevalier de Lascombes and Gombaud.

== History ==
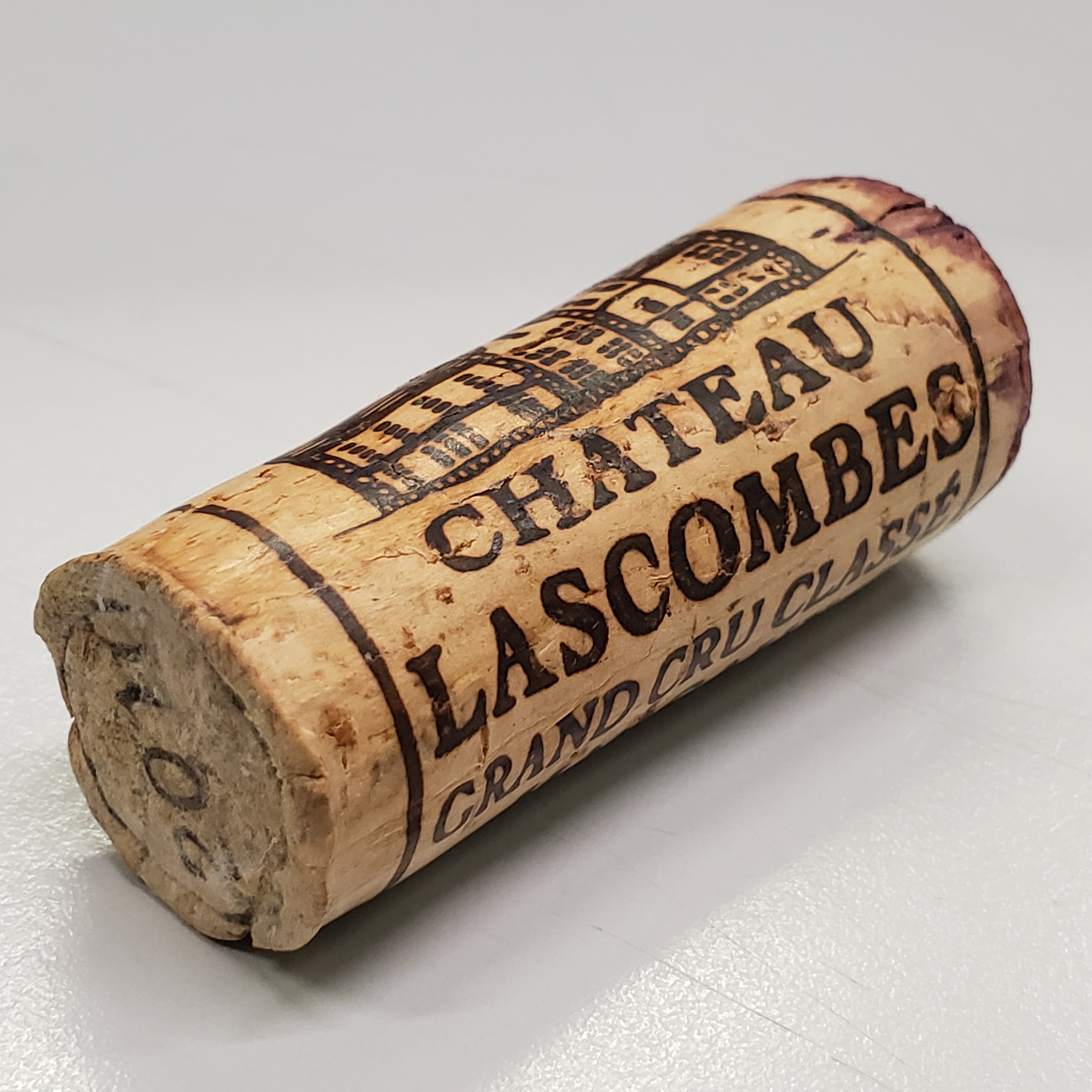

In the 17th century the estate belonged to Antoine, chevalier de Lascombes, and has kept his name. Some locals suggest the estate, which is situated on the highest knoll of Margaux, takes its name from "la côte" ("height") via "lascote" to "lascombes". Antoine de Lascombes (born 1625) inherited or had possession of the estate from the Durfort de Duras family, with whose properties in the Bordeaux it remained at first integrated; wine is first mentioned in 1700 In the eighteenth century the domaine was separated from the property of the comtes de de Duras and was inherited by Jean-François and Anne de Lascombes. Jean-François de Lascombes was a councillor at the parlement of Bordeaux, king's procureur at the Admiralty and a member of the Académie de Bordeaux (1761). The vineyard remained the property of the Lascombes family for three generations until after the French Revolution. Until 1860 the estate bore the name Domaine de Lascombes.

Through sales and inheritance the estate passed through a succession of owners, until it was formed into a company in 1926, with the Ginestet family, then owners of Château Margaux, as major shareholders. During the later stages of World War II the country house served as a headquarters for the Allied forces.

Château Lascombes was purchased by Alexis Lichine and a syndicate of American investors that included David Rockefeller, in 1952. Shortly before, Lichine also purchased another Margaux estate, Château Prieuré-Lichine. Lichine improved the vineyards through his expertise and commitment. In 1971 the backing company was taken over by the British brewing company Bass Charrington, bringing the Lichine era to an end.

Following the acquisition by the Bass Group, winemaker René Vanatelle was recruited as the winemaker. Vanatelle carried out extensive evaluation of the terroir, now extended to 84 hectares (208 acres) of Lascombes' vineyards and found that only 50 hectares (125 acres) actually produced wines of Deuxièmes Crus quality. In the 1980s, he began isolating these different segments of the vineyard and used the lesser quality terroir to produce a second wine known as Château Segonnes. In 1997, prior to his retirement, Vanatelle introduced a second wine of higher quality, Chevalier de Lascombes, which was matured in oak barrels (a third of which being new) for 14–20 months. Château Segonnes is still being produced, but now as a third wine. Following Vanatelle's retirement, Bruno Lemoine, formerly of Château Montrose, was named new winemaker.

In 2001, the estate was purchased for $67 million by US-based Colony Capital with the entrepreneur Yves Vatelot. The new owners invested heavily in modernizing Lascombes, which had been considered an underperformer in relation to its classification. While Lascombes has been awarded high notes for its wines by many wine critics (such as Robert M. Parker Jr.) and managed to significantly increase the price of its Grand vin since the investment, the US owners made the château available for sale in late 2007. Tony Ryan was also a major shareholder. In 2011, Lascombes was sold to the French insurance group MACSF for 200 million euro, of which approximately 50 million euro was its stock of wine.

Currently Lascombes employs Michel Rolland as consultant of oenology.

== Production ==
The vineyard area comprises 84 hectares (210 acres) with a grape variety distribution of 50% Merlot, 45% Cabernet Sauvignon and 5% Petit Verdot. The château annually produces 250,000 bottles of the Grand vin and 70,000 bottles of the second wine Chevalier de Lascombes.

In 2008, it was reported that Lascombes had rented vineyards that belong to Château Martinens, a former Cru Bourgeois, which had 28 hectares (69 acres) of vineyards within AOC Margaux plus 25 hectares (62 acres) of Haut-Médoc AOC. Classified growths are allowed to expand their vineyard holdings without losing their classification, but only with vineyards of the same appellation as their own, which makes it uncertain to which purpose the Haut-Médoc vineyards would be put.

For most vintages, the composition of the Grand vin is 55% Cabernet Sauvignon, 40% Merlot and 5% Petit Verdot. The second wine, Chevalier de Lascombes, will have a higher composition of Merlot. Château Lascombes is usually rich and full bodied with a concentration of ripe fruit and underlying aromas of cedar. Like many Margaux wines, the tannins can be supple. The wines typically are ready for drinking after eight years and can usually last up to thirty.

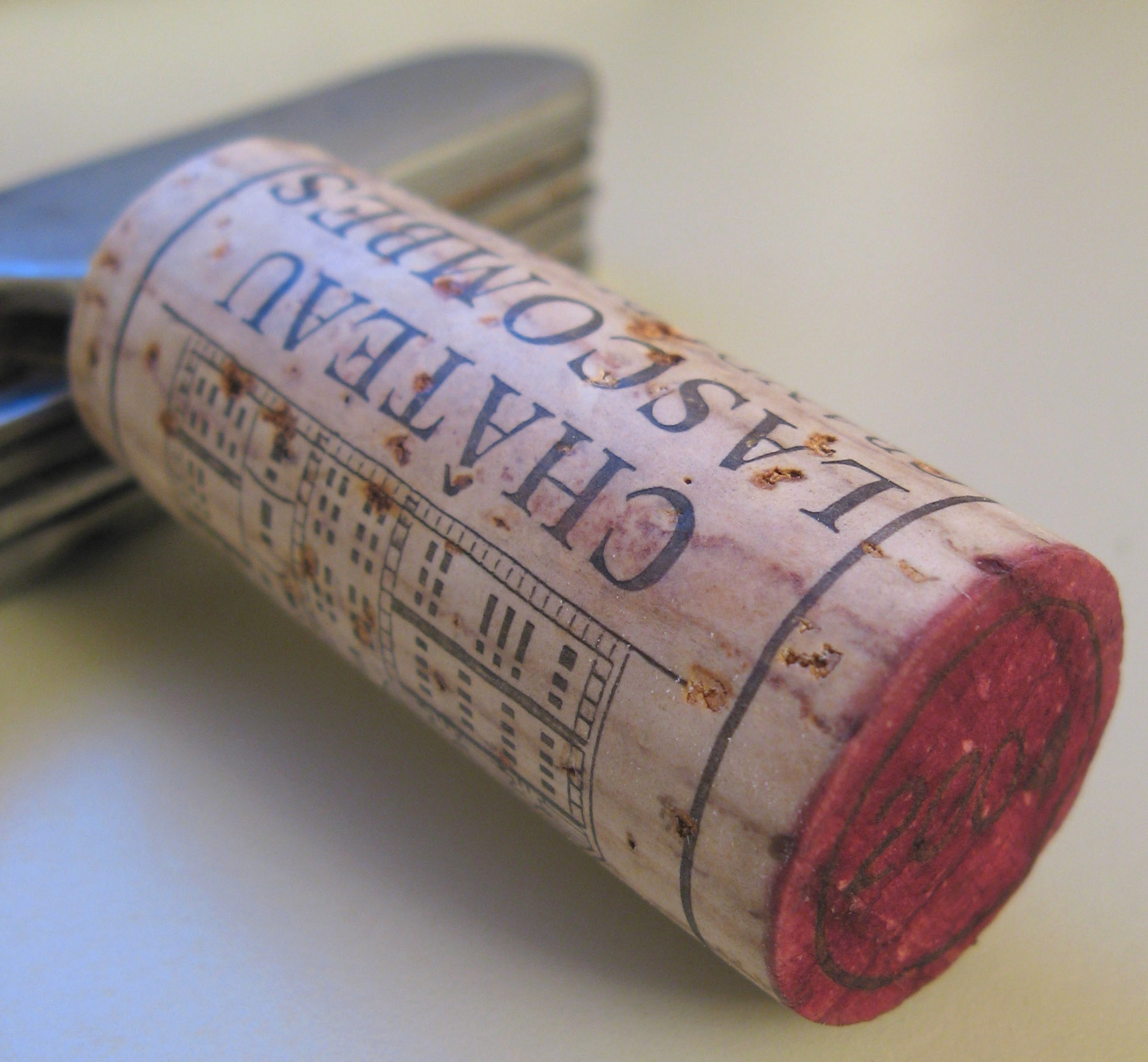
