= Château Margaux =

French vineyard and winery

Coordinates: 45.044418°N 0.668706°W

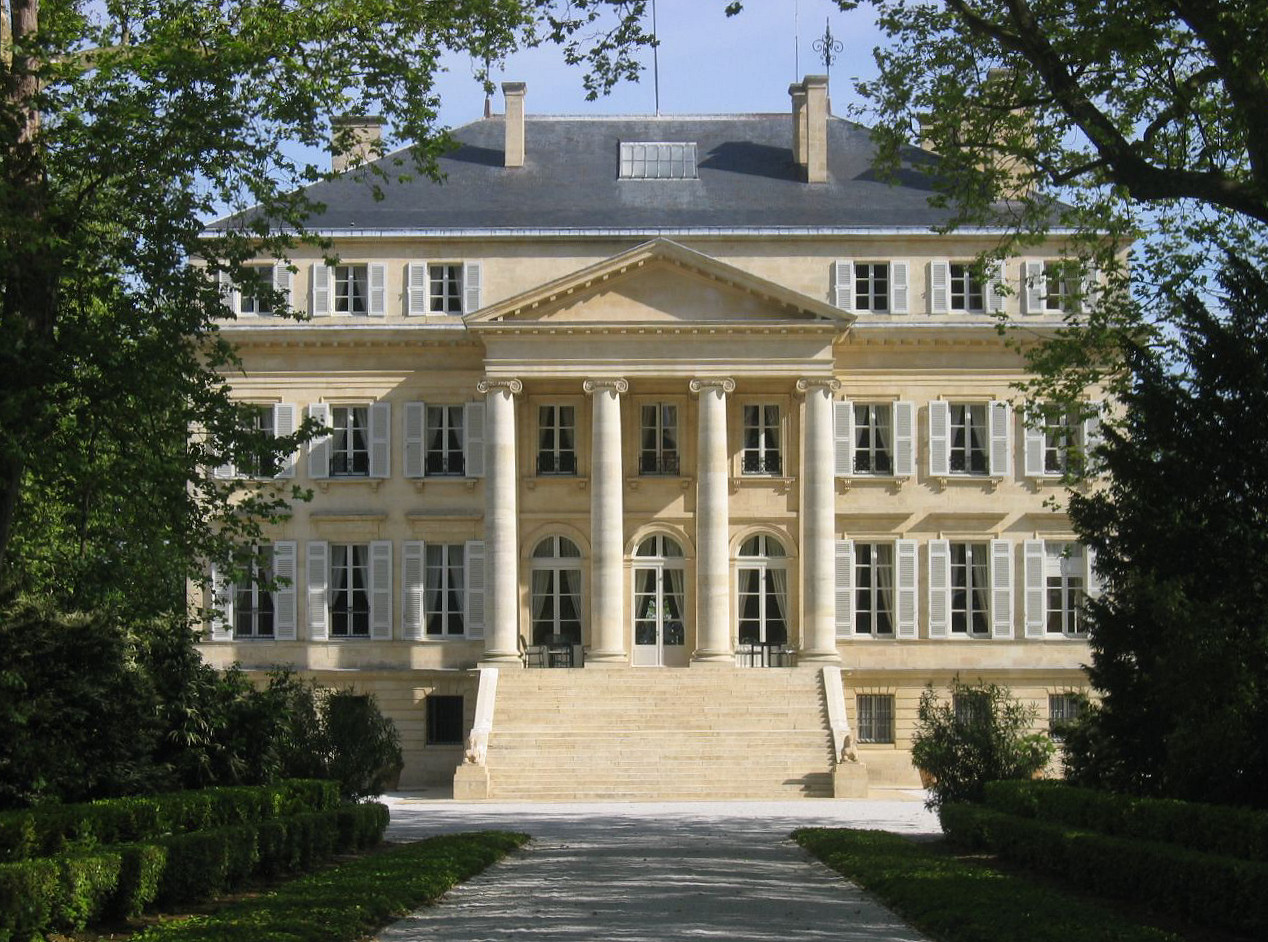
The reconstructed Château Margaux completed in 1812

Château Margaux (French pronunciation: [ʃato maʁɡo]), archaically La Mothe de Margaux, is a wine estate of Bordeaux wine located in Margaux-Cantenac, France, and was one of five wines to achieve Premier cru (first growth) status in the Bordeaux Classification of 1855. The estate's best wines are very expensive, with a bottle of Château Margaux grand vin reaching over $1,000. The estate is located in the commune of Margaux on the left bank of the Garonne estuary in the Médoc region, in the département of Gironde, and the wine is delimited to the AOC of Margaux.

The estate also produces a second wine named Pavillon Rouge du Château Margaux, a third wine named Margaux de Château Margaux, a dry white wine named Pavillon Blanc du Château Margaux which does not conform to the Margaux appellation directives, as well as a second dry white wine named Pavillon Blanc Second Vin, launched in 2024.

== History ==
Château Margaux presentation card dated 1931, demonstrating the designs of the early 20th century, the label, cork, case and capsule markings

The estate has been occupied since at least the 12th century, with the site occupied by a fortified castle known as Lamothe or La Mothe (from motte, a small rise in the land), and wine under names such as "Margou" and "Margous" was known in the 15th century, but it was with the arrival of the Lestonnac family in the 16th century that wine production became of particular importance, and in the 1570s Pierre de Lestonnac expanded the property and cleared many of the grain fields to make way for vines.

The lineage of ownership was to continue in a relatively direct path from the Lestonnacs, though through the female side, with proprietors' names such as d'Aulède, Fumel, d'Hargicourt, including an alliance of marriage with the Pontac family of Château Haut-Brion in 1654, which became crucial to the inclusion of Château Margaux among the four first growths.

By the beginning of the 18th century, the estate comprised 265 hectares (650 acres) with a third devoted to viticulture, which is nearly identical to the modern layout. As with many of Médoc's châteaux, the early 18th century saw the wine develop from a pale watery drink that faded within only a few years, to the dark, complex liquid that has been stored in cellars ever since, and a transformation was largely due to an estate manager named Berlon, who revolutionised techniques of wine-making by introducing novel ideas such as banning harvesting in the early morning to avoid dew-covered grapes and subsequently dilution, and acknowledged the importance of soil quality in the various terroir found on the estate.

In 1771, wine from the estate became the first claret to be sold at Christie's, and upon visiting Bordeaux in 1787, Thomas Jefferson made note of Château Margaux as one of the "four vineyards of first quality".

Following the French Revolution, the owner Elie du Barry was executed by guillotine and the estate expropriated, eventually becoming the property of the citizen Miqueau who neglected its care and maintenance. Briefly rescued by Laure de Fumel, she was soon forced to sell, and in 1802 the estate was purchased by the Marquis de la Colonilla, Bertrand Douat for 654,000 francs.

The estate's old château was torn down and completely rebuilt when Douat commissioned one of Bordeaux' foremost architects, Louis Combes, to create the buildings in the First Empire style, the mansion for the Marquis to move into by 1812.

On 17 August 1835, Margaux was bought by the Spanish magnate Alejandro María Aguado, 1st Marquess of Marismas del Guadalquivir, who had amassed a vast fortune as a banker.

Large portions of shares in the estate were bought by the Bordeaux wine merchant Fernand Ginestet (then owner of the adjacent Château Lascombes) in 1925, and the family share was gradually increased to allow his son Pierre Ginestet to take complete ownership in 1949. In 1965, Pierre Ginestet controversially declared a new estate policy that the vintage year would only be affixed to great vintages, while selling the wine of lesser years as non-vintage wine, like the customary practice of Champagne.

=== Modern history ===
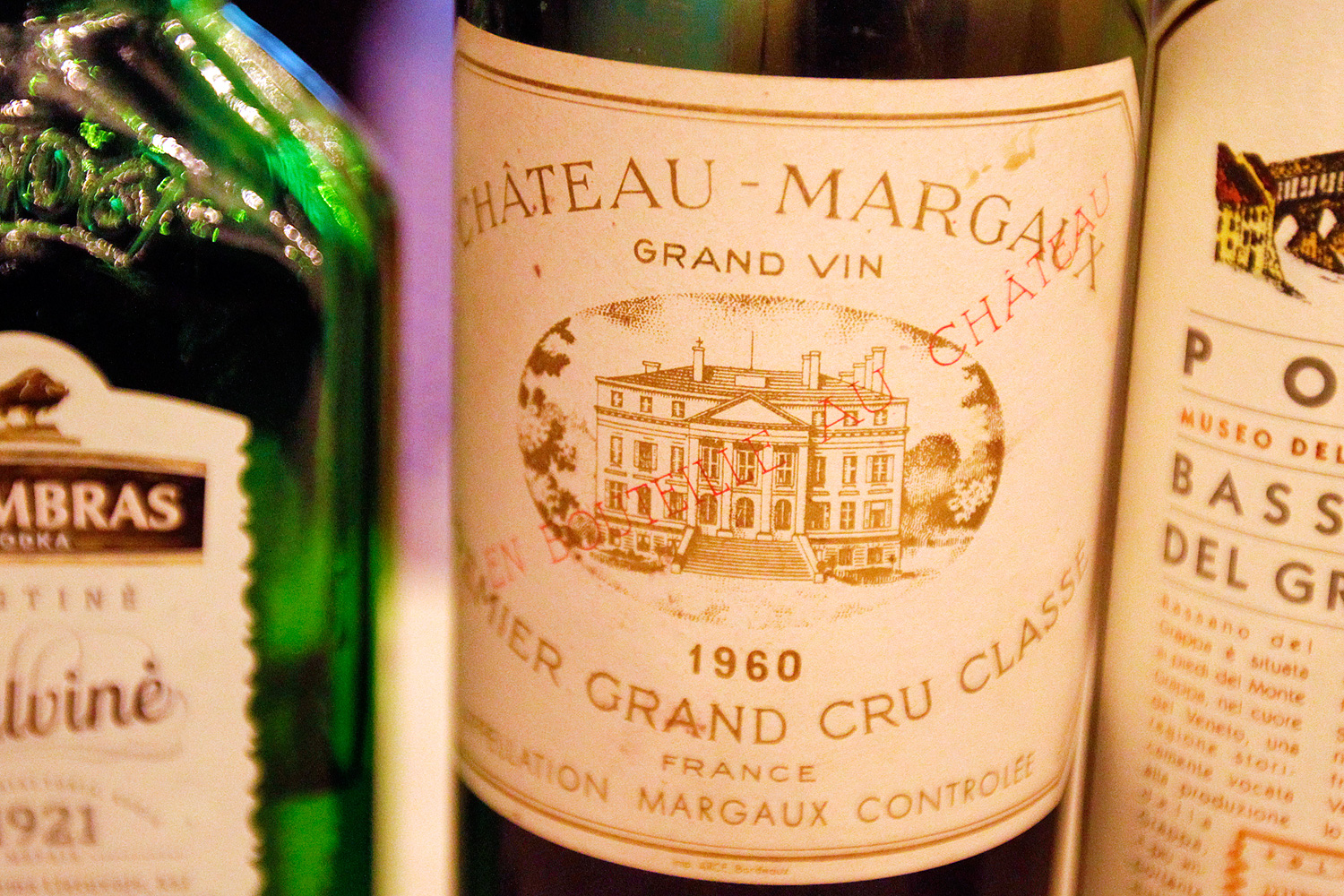
Bottle label of Château Margaux 1960

Following the Bordeaux economic crisis of 1973, the Ginestet family were forced to sell Château Margaux. An attempt by National Distillers & Chemical Corporation to acquire Château Margaux was vetoed by the French government on grounds that the estate was a national treasure. This was later reported to be an attempt backed by The Coca-Cola Company, and was directly prevented by French President Valéry Giscard d'Estaing.

A successful acquisition took place in 1976 by French grocery and finance group Félix Potin, headed by Greek André Mentzelopoulos, for a sum near 72 million francs, or US$16 million. Mentzelopoulos transformed the vineyard through restoring the neglected vineyard, chais, and mansion and the consultancy of oenologist Émile Peynaud. By the time of Mentzelopoulos' death in 1980, Château Margaux was considered substantially restored to its former reputation, with the 1978 and 1979 vintages declared "exceptional".

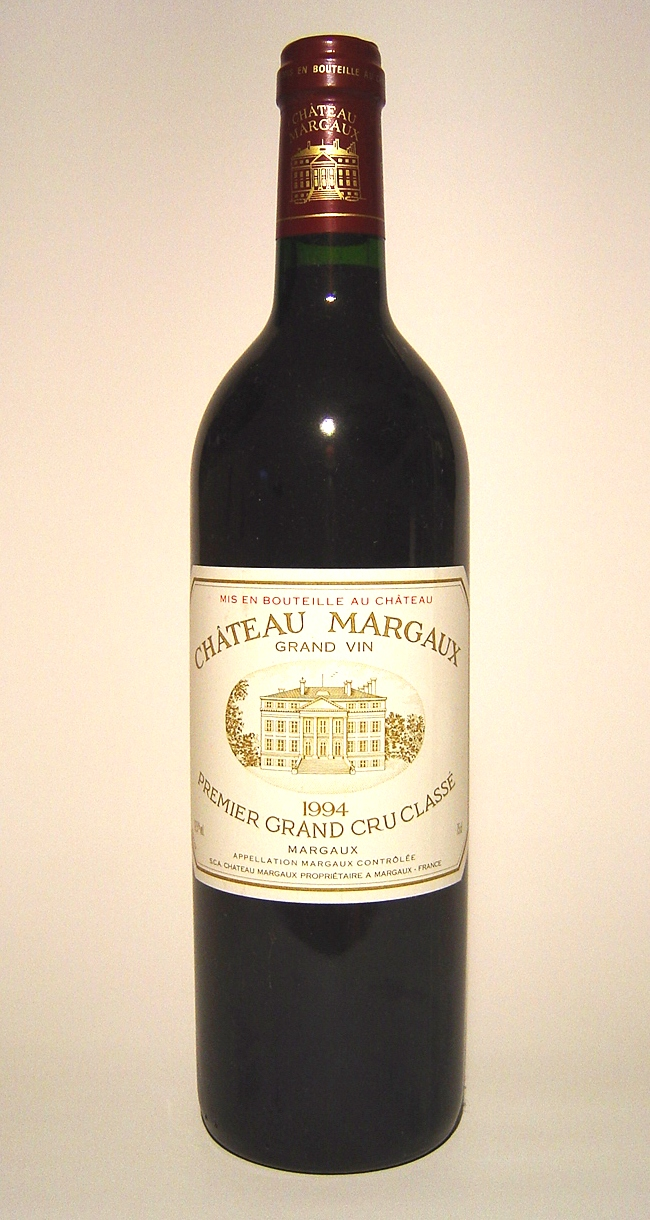
A bottle of Château Margaux 1994

At the beginning of the 1990s, an exchange of shares was negotiated with the Agnelli family but the management remained in the hands of Mentzelopoulos' daughter Corinne Mentzelopoulos. She promoted Paul Pontallier – whose dissertation for his PhD in Oenology was on the effect of barrel ageing on red wines – to managing director of First Growth (Premier Cru), and their owner/director partnership is credited with elevating Château Margaux in its standing amongst the (only) five Châteaux with Premier Cru status. Since Paul Pontallier's death in 2016 the estate has been managed by Philippe Bascaules. In 2003, Corinne Mentzelopoulos bought back the majority stake and became the sole shareholder of Château Margaux.

2023 marked a new era with a generational change within the Mentzelopoulos family. After 43 years of having been Chief Executive Officer, Corinne handed over the reins to her children and appointed her daughter Alexis as CEO of the Estate. As for her daughter Alexandra, she became the President of the Supervisory Board of the holding company.

Since 1989, a bottle of Château Margaux 1787, bearing the etched initials of previous owner Thomas Jefferson, holds the record as the most expensive bottle of wine ever sold, and was insured for $225,000 (equivalent to $580,000 in 2025).

Margaux Hemingway received her given name from this wine; born Margot, she changed the spelling to Margaux when her parents – who drank the wine on the night she was conceived – told her this background.

== Production ==
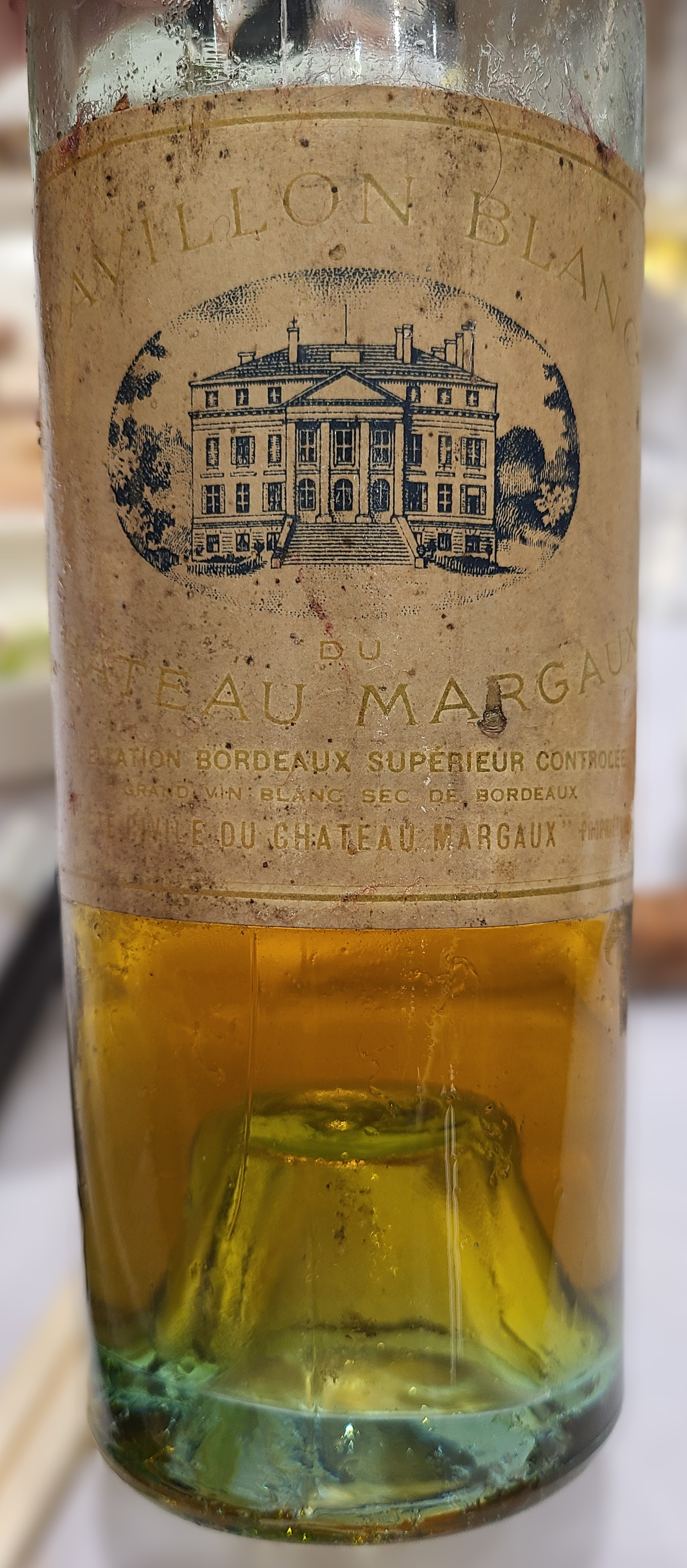
Pavillon Blanc du Château Margaux

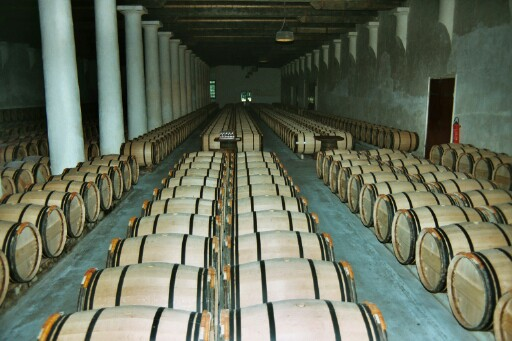
Barrels in a Château Margaux chai

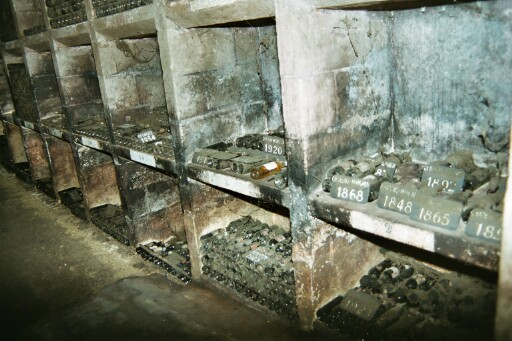
Ancient bottles in the Château Margaux cellar

The domaine of Château Margaux extends 262 hectares (650 acres), of which 87 hectares (210 acres) are entitled to the Margaux AOC declaration. 80 hectares (200 acres) are planted with 75% Cabernet Sauvignon, 20% Merlot, with 2% Cabernet Franc and Petit verdot. 12 hectares (30 acres) are cultivated with Sauvignon blanc to make the dry white Pavillon Blanc.

The average annual production of the Grand vin, Château Margaux, is 150,000 bottles, while the second wine Pavillon Rouge du Château Margaux has an average production of 200,000 bottles. The dry white Pavillon Blanc du Château Margaux has a production of around 35,000 bottles, and must be sold under the generic Bordeaux AOC as the cultivation of Sauvignon blanc does not fall under the directives of the Margaux AOC. The remainder of the production, what is determined to be "lesser grapes", is sold off in bulk.
