= Liv-ex =

Online wine-trading marketplace

Liv-ex Ltd.
- Industry: Wine
- Founded: 2000; 26 years ago
- Founders: James Miles and Justin Gibbs
- Headquarters: London, United Kingdom
- Area served: Worldwide
- Key people: James Miles (chairman and CEO); Justin Gibbs (deputy chairman and exchange director)
- Services: Online marketplace
- Website: liv-ex.com

Liv-ex (the London International Vintners Exchange) is a business-to-business (B2B) online marketplace for fine wine, as well as a source of market data and insight. The platform is based on the London Stock Exchange and allows businesses to buy and sell wines, as well as track business trends.

Liv-ex was founded in 2000 with the goal of improving transparency and safety in trading fine wine on the secondary market. The platform is headquartered in London, with an office in Bordeaux, and as of 2023 had about 620 traders in 42 different countries.

Liv-ex tracks around 200,000 wines using Liv-ex Wine Identification Numbers (LWIN), 7-digit codes for identifying wines and vintages now standard across much of the wine industry. Liv-ex also produces various popular market indices, such as the Liv-ex Fine Wine 50 Index, which track the price fluctuations of the top wines traded on Liv-ex.

== History ==
The company was founded in 2000 by former stockbrokers James Miles and Justin Gibbs. Modelled on the London Stock Exchange, Liv-ex was established to create a central marketplace where wine professionals could trade, access market data and share a common set of standards.

== Overview ==
Liv-ex facilitates live international trading between member businesses. Trading on Liv-ex is reserved for professional buyers and sellers of fine wine and takes place through a standardized and anonymous marketplace. As of 2026, Liv-ex contained approximately £155 million of live buying and selling opportunities.

Liv-ex data is derived from buying and selling activity on the exchange and includes wine businesses transactions, real-time bids and offers, and historical pricing data. Liv-ex also provides independent market data and insights.

Liv-ex also provides storage and transport services for fine wines traded on the platform. Wine held in Liv-ex warehouses can be traded without being physically moved, enabling efficient transfer of ownership between members.

Liv-ex publishes annual coverage on the Bordeaux En Primeur campaign, as well as Power 100 – their list of the most powerful brands in the fine wine market in conjunction with The Drinks Business.

== Products ==
=== LWIN ===
LWIN is a standardized wine numbering system created in 2011 to avoid errors in communication, transfer and referencing. Similar to the ISBN, it allows businesses to establish which item in one database corresponds to which item in another database. The LWIN has become the dominant industry standard for identifying wines.

Each wine is assigned a seven-digit numerical code. The first six numbers of the code represent each wine's unique identifier, while the seventh number is a “check digit” that minimizes input errors. Additional information including the vintage, pack and bottle size can be appended to the LWIN in a standard format.

The LWIN standards for including additional data are:

- LWIN: 1234567 – Example Winery, Cabernet
- LWIN-11: 12345672012 – Example Winery, Cabinet, 2012
- LWIN-16: 1234567201200750 – Example Winery, Cabernet, 2012, 750ml bottle capacity
- LWIN-18: 123456720121200750 – Example Winery, Cabernet, 2012, 12 bottles of 750ml each.

The LWIN database, an open-source database of the 200,000 wines identified by LWIN codes, is free to use and download and is under the Creative Commons License.

=== Wine Matcher ===
Wine Matcher is a web-based, artificial intelligence tool that allows merchants to take lists of wines and transform them into a standardized set of wine names and formats with unique IDs (LWINs). It can also return the list with wine price data, such as market price or last trade, from Liv-ex.

In 2017, Wine Matcher was awarded "Supply Chain Initiative of the Year" by The Drinks Business. The judges called it a “very clever innovation” that “has far-reaching and practical implications for the fine wine trade”.

=== Automation ===
Liv-ex Automation allows members to automate their interactions with Liv-ex using APIs. Users can automate the trading and listing of wines, analyze product data, and add critic scores to websites.

== Liv-ex Indices ==
Liv-ex produces a number of fine wine indices that track prices for given groups of wines.

This includes three worldwide indices,

- Live-ex Fine Wine 50: tracks the top 50 wines in the world, all Bordeaux First Growths
- Liv-ex Fine Wine 100: considered the industry benchmark, representing the top 100 wines traded on Liv-ex
- Liv-ex Fine Wine 1000: represents the price movement of top 1000 wines

and nine regional indices.

- Liv-ex Bordeaux 500
- California 50
- Port 50
- Bordeaux Legends 40
- Burgundy 150
- Champagne 50
- Rhone 100
- Italy 100
- Rest of the World 60: tracks the ten most recent vintages of 6 wines from Spain, Chile, USA, and Australia

https://www.liv-ex.com/resources/indices/

== The Liv-ex Classification ==
The Liv-ex Classification 2019 is a league table that ranks the wines of the world by their average trade prices on Liv-ex. Based on the transactional activity of the world's largest pool of fine wine merchants, it reflects the changing buying patterns of the trade today.
