= Bordeaux wine regions =

Wine growing areas in France

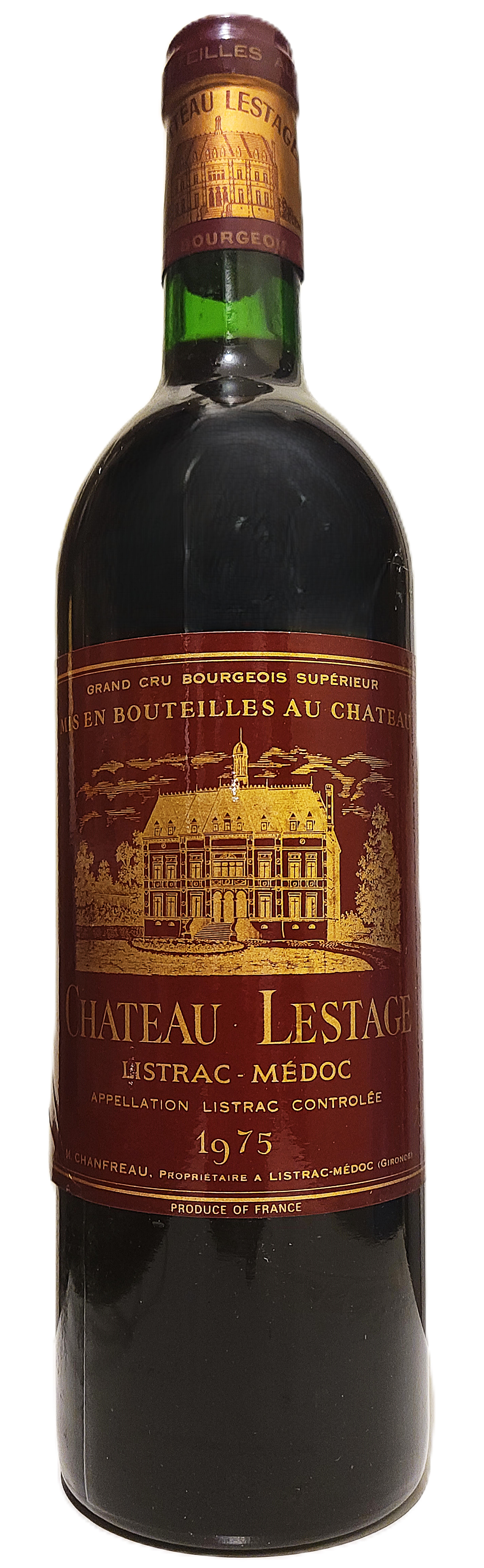
Château Lestage from Listrac-Médoc AOC

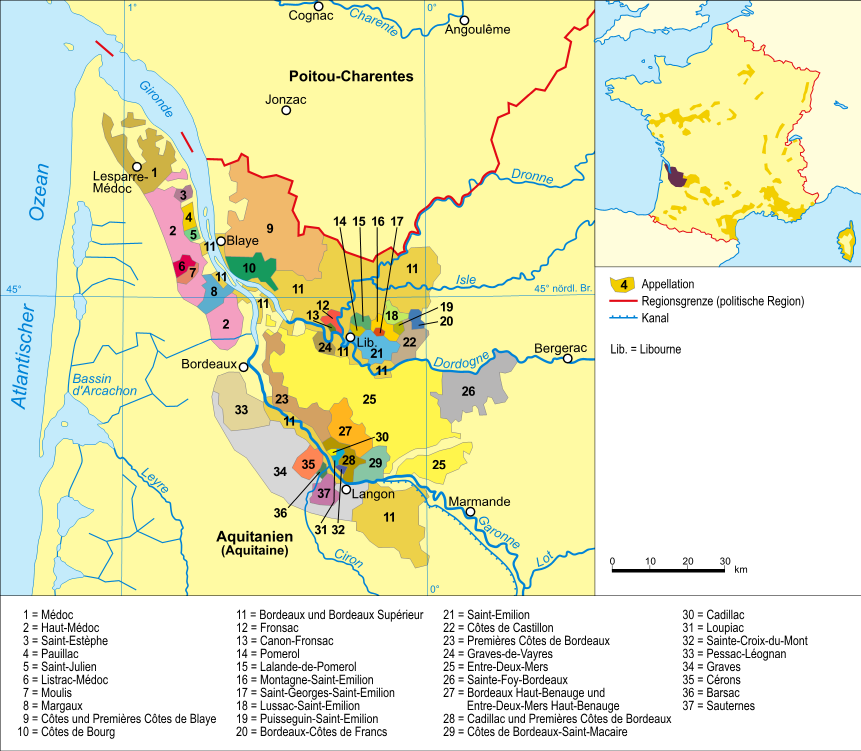
Bordeaux wine regions of Gironde department and its appellations

The wine regions of Bordeaux in France are a large number of wine growing areas, differing widely in size and sometimes overlapping, which lie within the overarching wine region of Bordeaux, centred on the city of Bordeaux and covering the whole area of the Gironde department of Aquitaine.

The Bordeaux region is naturally divided by the Gironde Estuary into a Left Bank area which includes the Médoc and Graves and a Right Bank area which includes the Libournais, Bourg and Blaye. The Médoc is itself divided into Haut-Médoc (the upstream or southern portion) and Bas-Médoc (the downstream or northern portion, often referred to simply as "Médoc").

There are various sub-regions within the Haut-Médoc, including St-Estèphe, Pauillac, St.-Julien and Margaux and the less well known areas of AOC Moulis and Listrac. Graves includes the sub-regions of Pessac-Léognan and Sauternes (among others), and Sauternes in turn includes the sub-region of Barsac. The Libournais includes the sub-regions of Saint-Émilion and Pomerol (among others). There is an additional wine region of Entre-Deux-Mers, so called because it lies between the Garonne and Dordogne rivers, which combine to form the Gironde. This region contains several less well known sweet wine areas of Cadillac and St. Croix de Mont.

All of these regions (except the Libournais) have their own appellation and are governed by Appellation d'origine contrôlée (AOC) laws which dictate the permissible grape varieties, alcohol level, methods of pruning and picking, density of planting and appropriate yields as well as various winemaking techniques. Bordeaux wine labels will usually include the region on the front if all the grapes have been harvested in a specific region and the wine otherwise complies with the AOC requirements. There are about 50 AOCs applicable to the Bordeaux region.

Both red and white Bordeaux wines are almost invariably blended. The permissible grape varieties in red Bordeaux are: Cabernet Sauvignon, Merlot, Cabernet Franc, Malbec and Petit Verdot. While wine making styles vary, a rule of thumb is that the Left Bank is predominantly Cabernet Sauvignon based with the Right Bank being more Merlot based. The Graves area produces both red wine (from the grapes previously mentioned) and white wine from the Sauvignon blanc, Sémillon and Muscadelle grapes. The area of Sauternes (including Barsac) is known for its botrytized dessert wines.

== Classifications ==
There are a number of classifications of Bordeaux wines, covering different regions. None of these attempts to be a comprehensive classification of all the producers within a given area: rather, only the producers (universally known as châteaux, although not usually possessing the architectural grandeur that might imply) perceived as being of an unusually high standard are included in the classification. The châteaux included in the classification are referred to as classed or classé, and those not included are referred to as unclassed. Some classifications sub-divide the classed châteaux, according to the perceived quality. On the Left Bank, the Bordeaux Wine Official Classification of 1855 is the starting point for classification. Although this purports to be a classification of all Bordeaux wine, it in fact exclusively lists red wine producers from the Haut-Médoc plus Château Haut-Brion of Graves, and (in a separate list) sweet white wine producers from Sauternes (including Barsac). Estates in the Médoc which were not classified in that listing may be classified under the Cru Bourgeois label. In 1953, a Classification of Graves wine was produced. Although this purports to classify the whole of Graves, it exclusively lists châteaux in Pessac-Léognan. In 1954, a separate classification of Saint-Émilion wine was set up for this Right Bank region.

== Generic Bordeaux ==
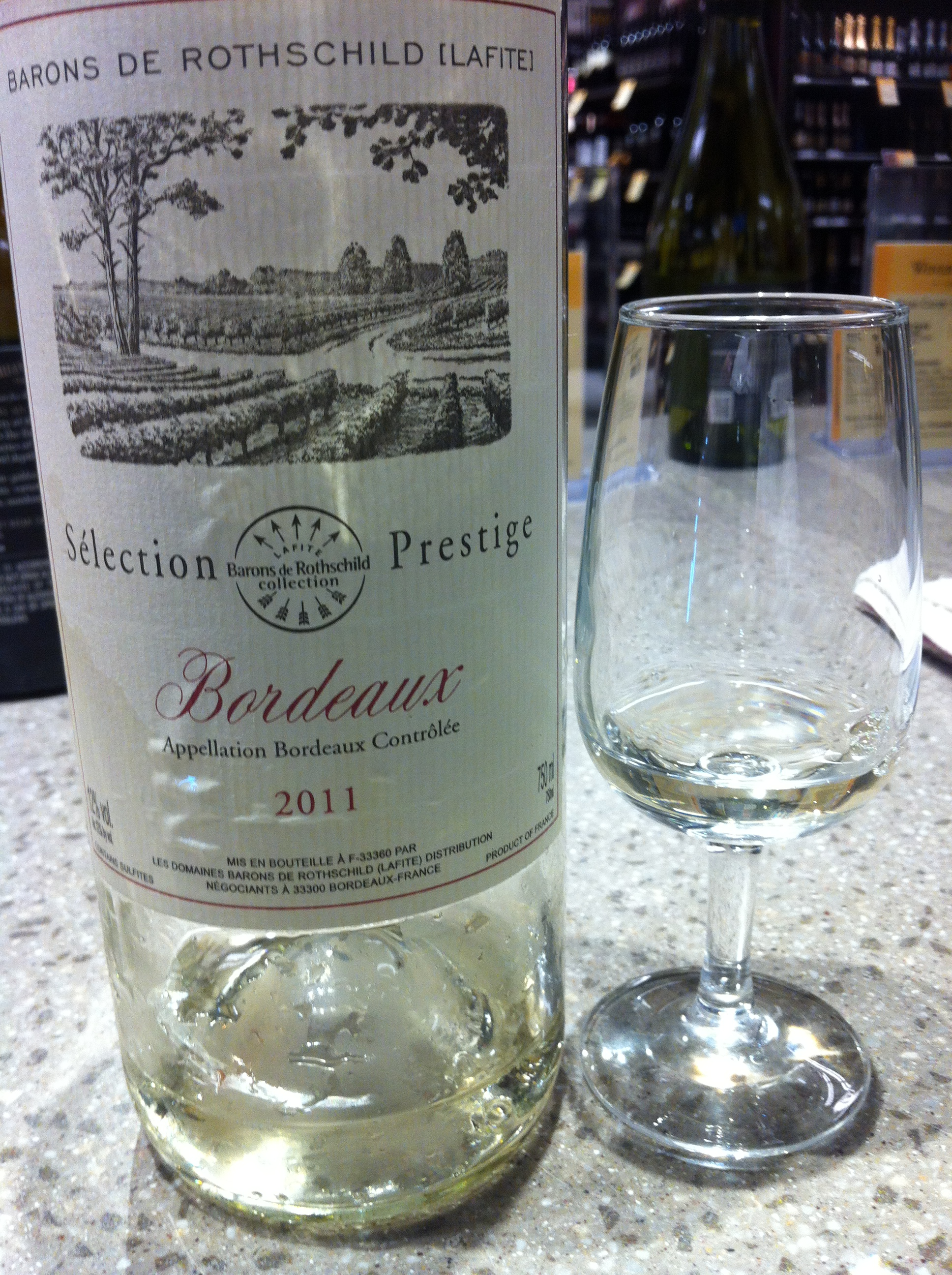
A dry white Bordeaux made under the generic Bordeaux AOC

There are eight AOCs (Appellations d'origine contrôlée) that cover the entire department of Gironde. Any producer within the region is entitled to use these appellations, whether or not they are also entitled to use a more specific regional appellation. These appellations are: Bordeaux, Bordeaux Supérieur, Bordeaux Sec, Bordeaux Moelleux, Bordeaux Clairet, Crémant-de-Bordeaux, Bordeaux Rosé and Vin de Pays de l'Atlantique. Where these appellations are used for wines which would otherwise be entitled to use a more specific appellation, they are generally used for wines of lower quality made by a négociant or co-operative. Many of Bordeaux's supermarket brands like Mouton Cadet, Dourthe Numero 1 and Sichel Sirius utilise these generic Bordeaux AOCs. More than half of Bordeaux's production uses these generic appellations.

Red wine produced under the Bordeaux AOC is made mostly from Cabernet Sauvignon and Merlot, with the addition of Cabernet Franc and small amounts of Petit Verdot, Malbec and Carmenère. This appellation covers around 42,600 hectares of vines and produces around 223 million litres of wine (which is nearly a third of the total wine production of Bordeaux). White wine produced under the Bordeaux Sec AOC is made mostly from Sauvignon blanc and Sémillon, with the addition of some Muscadelle, Colombard, Mauzac, Merlot blanc, Ondenc and Ugni blanc. It must contain no more than 4g/L of residual sugar. This appellation covers around 6500 hectares of vines and 38 million litres of wine. If it has more than 4g/L of residual sugar, then it may be labelled as Bordeaux Molleux AOC, but little wine is in fact produced under this AOC. Bordeaux Supérieur AOC covers both red and white wines, and the grapes used are the same, but permitted yields are slightly lower, minimum alcohol content is slightly higher and slightly longer aging is required. The amount of red wine produced under this appellation (around 45 million litres, from 10,000 hectares of vines) is much greater than the amount of white wine produced (around 170,000 litres from 60 hectares).

Rosé wine produced under the Bordeaux Rosé AOC is made from Cabernet Sauvignon, Merlot and Cabernet Franc. As is usual for Rosé, the grape skins are briefly left in contact with the must, but are removed prior to fermentation. This appellation covers around 4725 hectares of vines and 17 million litres of wine. Bordeaux Clairet AOC is intermediate between red and rosé wine, and is made from the same grapes as Bordeaux Rosé but undergoes a longer maceration (between 24 and 48 hours). Production is around 5 million litres from 925 hectares of vines. Note that, although the description 'clairet' may be derived from the English 'claret', 'claret' in fact refers exclusively to red Bordeaux.

A small amount of sparkling wine is made in the Bordeaux region, under the appellation Crémant-de-Bordeaux AOC (known before 1990 as Bordeaux Mousseux). This is made using the methode traditionelle from the same grapes as white Bordeaux if white and the same grapes as red Bordeaux if rosé. The great majority is white, accounting for around 900,000 litres of production, as opposed to 20,000 litres of rosé.

The appellation Vin de Pays de l'Atlantique was introduced in 2006, as a complement to the existing range of Bordeaux appellations, and covers grape varieties not permitted in classic Bordeaux, notably Chardonnay for white wines and Syrah for red wines. Nearly 4 million litres of wine is produced under this appellation, 62% of it red.

== Left Bank ==
The wine regions of the Left bank of the Gironde estuary are bordered by large coniferous forest land that have a tempering effect on the maritime climate of the area.

=== The Médoc ===
The region spans the left bank of the Gironde from the mouth of the river to the city of Bordeaux and includes the four famous communes of St-Estephe, Pauillac, St. Julien and Margaux. It is about 60 km north to south, and about 10 km wide, with around 10,600 hectares under vines and a production of about 50 million litres per year. All the wine made here is red.

==== The Médoc appellations ====
- Médoc AOC
- Haut-Médoc AOC
  - Saint-Estèphe AOC
  - Pauillac AOC
  - Saint-Julien AOC
  - Listrac-Médoc AOC
  - Moulis-en-Médoc AOC
  - Margaux AOC

==== Bas-Médoc ====
The northern or down-stream part was formerly known as the Bas-Médoc (lower Médoc), but is now simply (but confusingly) labeled as Médoc. This region is some 34 km long, by 10 km wide, stretching from the mouth of the Gironde to St-Estèphe, and includes some 5800 hectares of vines, producing around 28.5 million litres of wine annually. Although the region does not have any classified growths, there are a number of Crus Bourgeois located in the soft clay soil of the Médoc. As Merlot favors the clay more than Cabernet Sauvignon, the wines from this region tend to resemble the right bank style of St.-Emilion more than other left bank wines.

==== Haut-Médoc ====
The southern or up-stream part is known as the Haut-Médoc (upper Médoc). This region is some 45 km long, by 10 km wide. The total area under vines is around 4800 hectares, producing 22 million litres of wine a year. Six villages have their own appellations: Margaux, St-Julien, Pauillac, St-Estèphe, Listrac and Moulis. The remainder is classified simply as Haut-Médoc. The predominant grape planted here is Cabernet Sauvignon, although before 1800 it was Malbec.

===== St-Estèphe =====
Among the four famous Left Bank communes, St-Estèphe is the northernmost region with the jalle du Breuil dividing it from Pauillac to the south. The soil of St-Estèphe is a heavy composite of clay washed ashore from the Gironde. This soil type drains slowly and gives St-Estèphe estates an advantage during dry summers. The wines produced here tend to have more acidity than other red Bordeaux and with less perfume. While Cabernet Sauvignon is still the dominant grape, this sub-region has more planting of Merlot than any other area in the Haut-Médoc.

St-Estèphe has five classified estates and numerous Cru Bourgeois. The area is also home to several independent vignerons who produce wine as various co-operatives such as the Marquis de Saint-Estèphe and Canterayne.

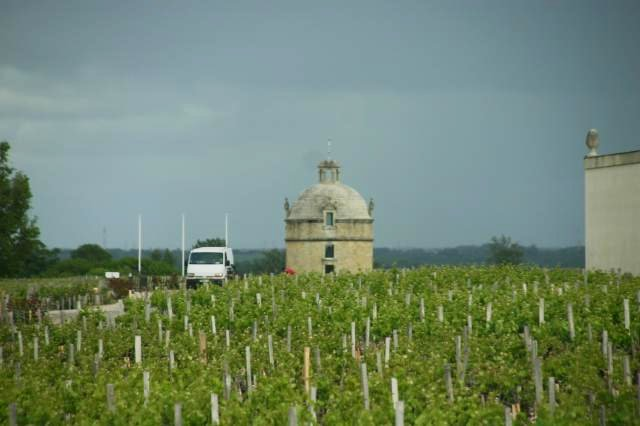
The Château Latour tower in Pauillac is featured on every bottle of this First Growth wine.

===== Pauillac =====
Located south of St-Estèphe, the area around Pauillac has the highest elevation of the Médoc with the estates of Château Mouton Rothschild and Château Pontet-Canet sitting on a summit of 30m. Vineyards in Pauillac are not as fragmented as most of the Médoc, with entire slopes and plateaus belonging to a single estate.

The area of Pauillac contains three of the five first growth estates of Bordeaux. These are Château Lafite-Rothschild, Château Latour and Château Mouton Rothschild. It also includes 15 other classed growths.

===== St-Julien =====
Situated on two plateaus between Pauillac and Margaux, the wine region of St-Julien has the smallest wine production of the four major regions in the Médoc. The region is divided into essentially two areas – the riverside estates around the village of St.Julien and the southern estates around the village of Beychevelle where the areas Cru Bourgeois are also grouped. The waters of the Gironde estuary have a warming influence on the climate which, coupled with the south-easterly exposure of most vineyards, helps to fully ripen the Cabernet Sauvignon vines in this area.

St-Julien has the highest proportion of classified estates of all the regions in Bordeaux. These eleven classed growths account for nearly 80 percent of the entire region's wine production.

Just to the west of St-Julien is the village of St-Laurent, with three further classed growths: Château La Tour Carnet, Château Belgrave and Château Camensac.

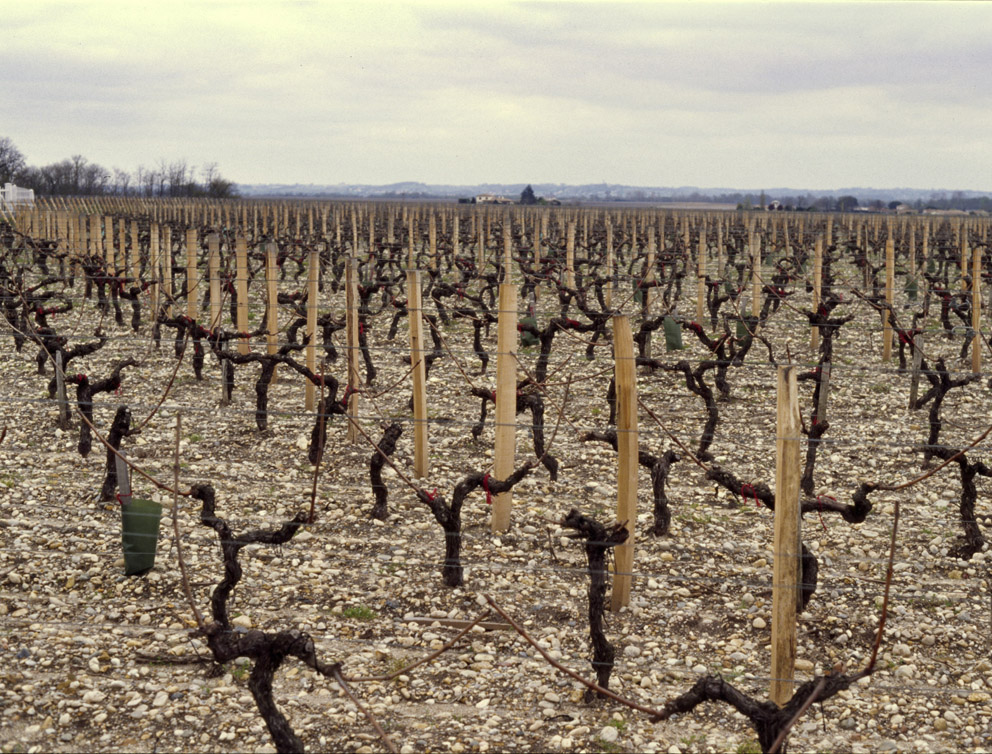
Vineyard of Moulis-en-Médoc

===== Central Médoc =====
This includes the area between St. Julien and Margaux. This area is home to many Crus Bourgeois. Within the Central Medoc there are the appellations Listrac-Médoc and Moulis-en-Médoc. Within Moulis, some wines estates near the village of Grand Poujeaux have added that name to their labels. The Listrac appellation is located on a limestone based plateau and produced highly tannic wines that require a bit of aging before they soften.

===== Margaux =====
The Margaux appellation encompasses the village of Margaux and the neighboring villages of Arsac, Labarde, Soussans and Cantenac. It is the most southerly of Médoc's appellations. This region has the thinnest soil in the region with the highest proportion of gravel that allows the soil to drain very well. The wines from this area are very susceptible to weather effects during the growing season and harvest.

The area is home to more 21 classified growths, more than any other appellation, with numerous second and third growths as well as one first growth, Château Margaux.

===== Southern Médoc =====
The area just south of Margaux is called Southern Médoc with wines produced in this area using the Haut-Médoc designation. This area includes the classified growths of Château La Lagune in Ludon and Château Cantemerle in Macau.

=== Graves ===
This region is bordered on the north by the Garonne river and contains the sub regions of Pessac-Léognan, Sauternes and Barsac. It is known for its intensely gravelly soil. The soil is the result of glaciers from the Ice Age which also left white quartz deposits that can still be found in the soil of some of the top wine making estates. While Château Haut-Brion was included in the 1855 classification of the Médoc, the Graves appellation itself was classified in 1953 for its red wine producers. White wines were included in an updated 1959 classification.

The Graves is considered the birthplace of claret. In the Middle Ages, the wines that were first exported to England were produced in this area. Château Pape Clément, founded at the turn of the fourteenth century by the future Pope Clement V, was the first named chateaux in all of Bordeaux. In 1663, Samuel Pepys' mention of Château Haut-Brion was the first recorded mention of French Claret in London.

==== The Graves appellations ====
- Graves AOC / Graves Supérieures AOC
  - Pessac-Léognan AOC
  - Cérons AOC
  - Sauternes AOC
    - Barsac AOC

==== Pessac-Léognan ====
This area of the Graves, located just south of the city of Bordeaux, is home to the first growth estate Château Haut-Brion, as well as all the 1953 classified Graves Growths, including Château La Mission Haut-Brion and Château Laville Haut-Brion. In addition to wine production, the area is known for its crops of pine trees and vineyards are often separated by rows of forest trees. The soil of Pessac-Léognan is composed of gravel terraces with sediments from different geological eras.

The area received appellation status in 1987 and produces both red and white wines. All of the estates named in the 1959 Graves classification are located in this appellation. Cabernet Sauvignon is the dominant grape variety, followed by Merlot and the white wine grapes Sauvignon blanc and Sémillon. The white wines of this area are barrel fermented and aged on their lees.

==== Sauternes and Barsac ====
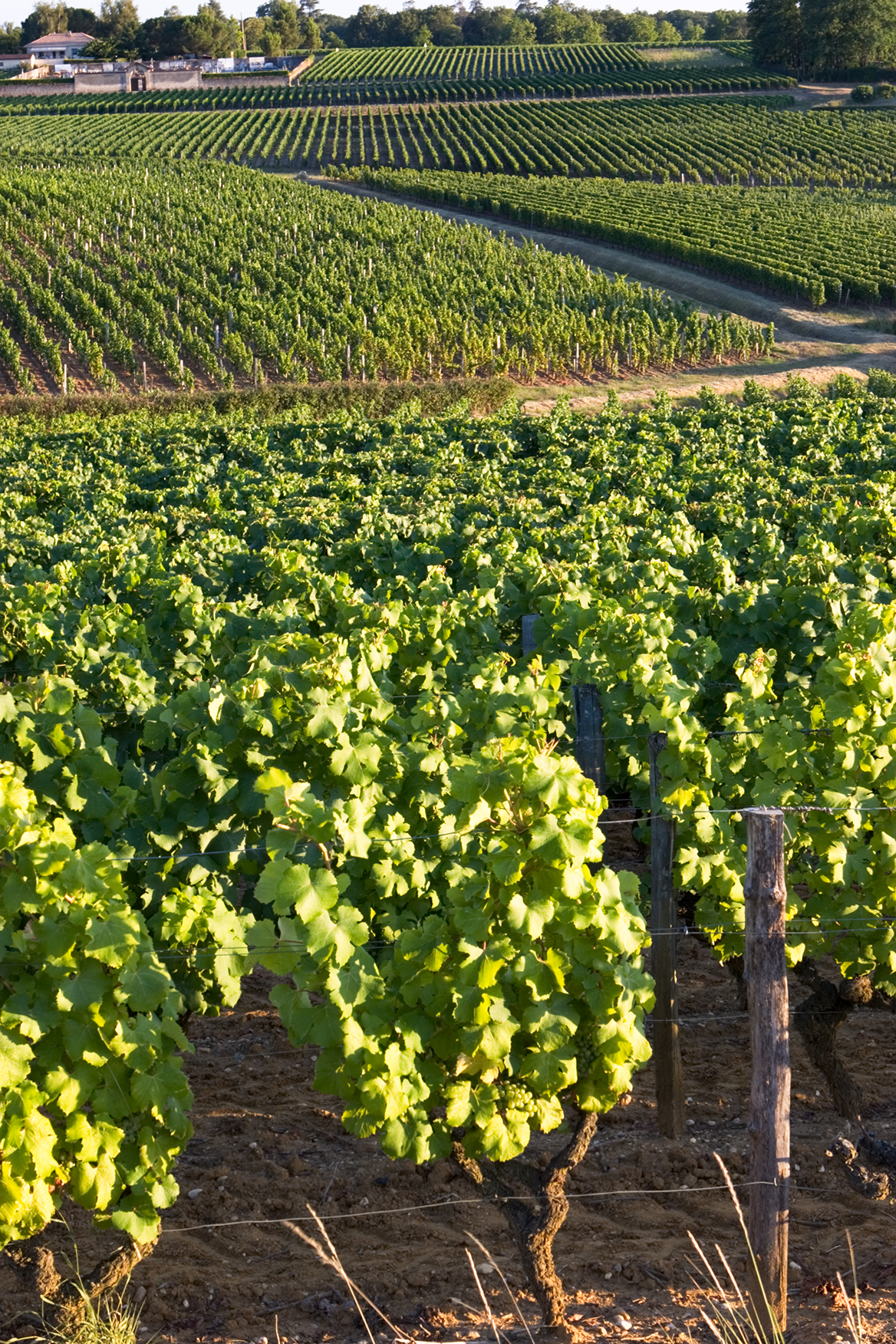
A Sauternes vineyard

Sauternes is a subregion of Graves known for its intensely sweet, white, dessert wines such as the Premier Cru Supérieur classified Château d'Yquem. Wines produced in the region of Barsac, such as Premiers Crus Château Climens and Château Coutet are allowed to be labeled either with the commune name or with Sauternes. The intense sweetness is the result of the grapes being affected by Botrytis cinerea, a fungus that is commonly known as noble rot. In the autumn, the Ciron river produces mist that descends upon the area and persists until after dawn. These conditions are conducive to the growth of the fungus which desiccates the grape and concentrates the sugars inside. The three main grapes of this area are Sémillon, Sauvignon blanc and Muscadelle.

Production costs for this area's botrytized wines are comparatively high. The evaporation and fungus produce low yields, five to six times less than in other Bordeaux regions. The grapes are normally harvested individually from the bunch with pickers going through the vineyards several times between September and November to ensure that the grapes are picked at their optimal points. The wine is then fermented in small oak barrels, further adding to the cost. Even with half bottles of the First Growths priced at several hundred dollars, these wines still have difficulties turning a profit and in the mid 20th century a string of bad vintages drove many growers in the region out of business.

== Right Bank ==
=== The Libournais ===
The area of Libournais encompasses much of what is referred to as the Right Bank. Named for its historical capital, Libourne, this area sits on the right bank of the Dordogne river and expands west past the convergence of the Isle. Further west, after the Garonne and Dordogne rivers meet, the region of Bourg and Blaye is found the right bank of the Garonne. The expression Right Bank typically refers to wines from the Pomerol and St-Emilion areas of Libournais. The vineyards of the Libournais are crossed by two rivers, Isle and Barbanne.

==== The Libournais appellations ====
- Saint-Émilion AOC
- Saint-Émilion Grand Cru AOC
- Montagne-Saint-Émilion AOC
- Saint-Georges-Saint-Émilion AOC
- Lussac-Saint-Émilion AOC
- Puisseguin-Saint-Émilion AOC
- Pomerol AOC
- Lalande-de-Pomerol AOC
- Fronsac AOC
- Canon-Fronsac AOC
- Castillon – Côtes-de-Bordeaux AOC (formerly Côtes-de-Castillon AOC), a sub-appellation of Côtes-de-Bordeaux AOC
- Francs – Côtes-de-Bordeaux AOC (formerly Bordeaux Cotes-de-Francs AOC), a sub-appellation of Côtes-de-Bordeaux AOC

==== Pomerol ====
The area of Pomerol was first cultivated by the Romans during their occupation of the area. Up until the early 20th century the area was known mostly for its white wine production. This area within Libournais doesn't have a distinct city center with several villages spread across an area about the same size as St.-Julien. The area overall has gravel-based soil that is typical of Bordeaux, with western and southern sections having more sandy soil while the northern and eastern sections toward St.-Émilion have more clay composition.

The wines of Pomerol have a high composition of Merlot in their blends and are considered the gentlest and least tannic and acidic of Bordeaux wines. Cabernet Franc, known in this area as Bouchet is the second leading grape and helps to contribute to the dark, deep coloring that is typical of Pomerol wines. Due to the reduced tannins found in these wines, they can typically be drunk much younger than other red Bordeaux. The chateaux in the area are not classified, with the winemakers seemingly disinclined to devise one, although Château Pétrus is often unofficially grouped with the First Growths of Bordeaux.

==== Saint-Émilion ====
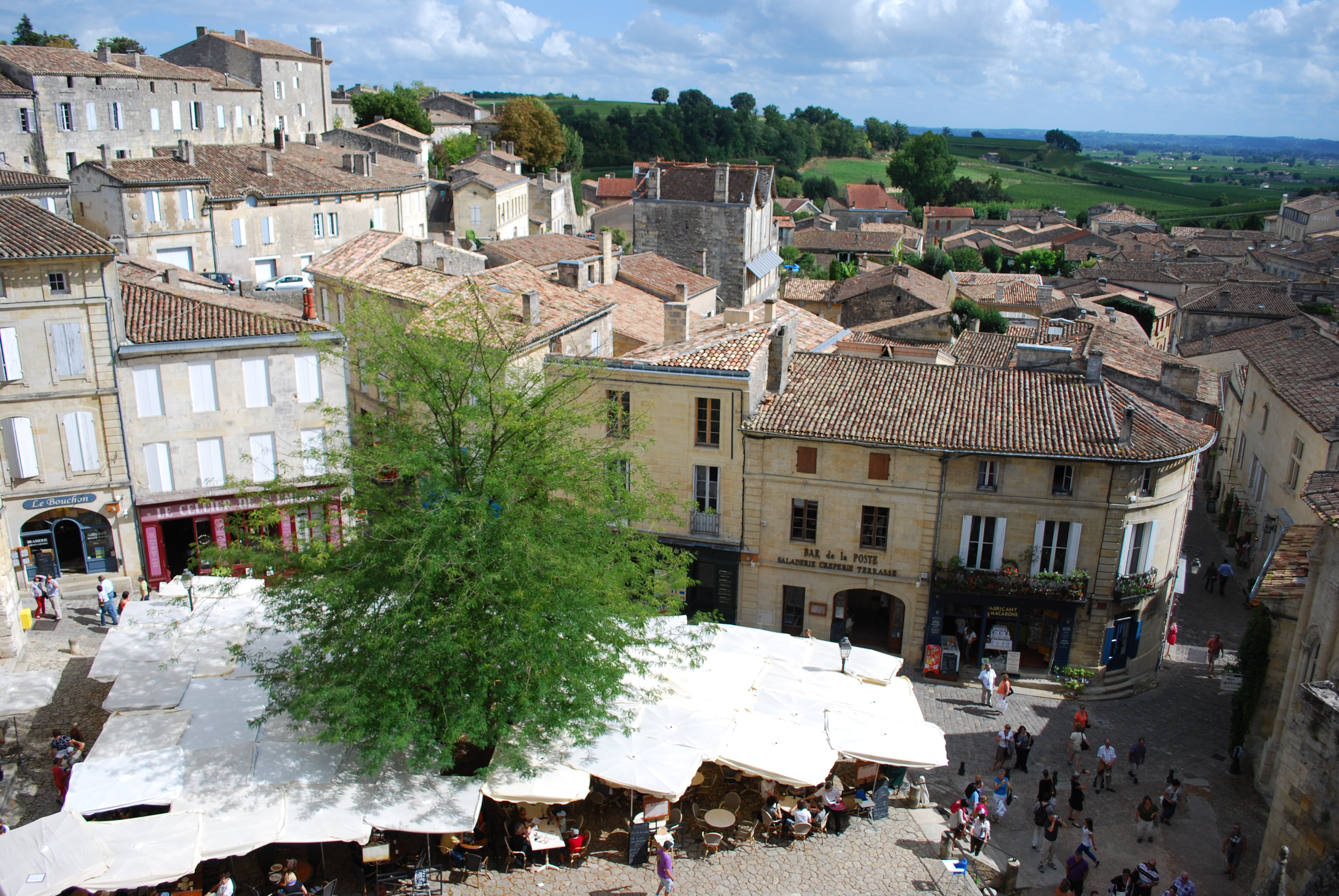
Saint-Émilion village

The wine region of Saint-Émilion centres on the commune of the same name. There are several villages around the region that share the Saint-Émilion name, such as Montagne-Saint-Émilion and St-Georges-Saint-Émilion, and are permitted to label their wines under the same name. The area is bordered to the west by Pomerol. Merlot is the dominant grape in this area, followed by Cabernet Franc. The climate and damper, cool soils of the area makes it difficult for Cabernet Sauvignon grapes to fully ripen and as such is less often used. The wines take a little longer to mature than the ones in Pomerol but are still able to be drunk relatively young for a Bordeaux (4–8 years). In favorable vintages the wines have a good aging potential.

Saint-Émilion wines were first classified in 1878 and have been continuously revised. Chateaux are divided into two First Growth classifications – Premiers Grands Crus Classés A, which currently includes Château Ausone and Château Cheval Blanc, and Premiers Grands Crus Classés B, which currently includes 13 chateaux such as Château Angélus and Château Figeac. Below the Premiers crus are the Grands Crus Classés which currently includes 55 chateaux. Estates can apply for classification by passing two tasting panels.

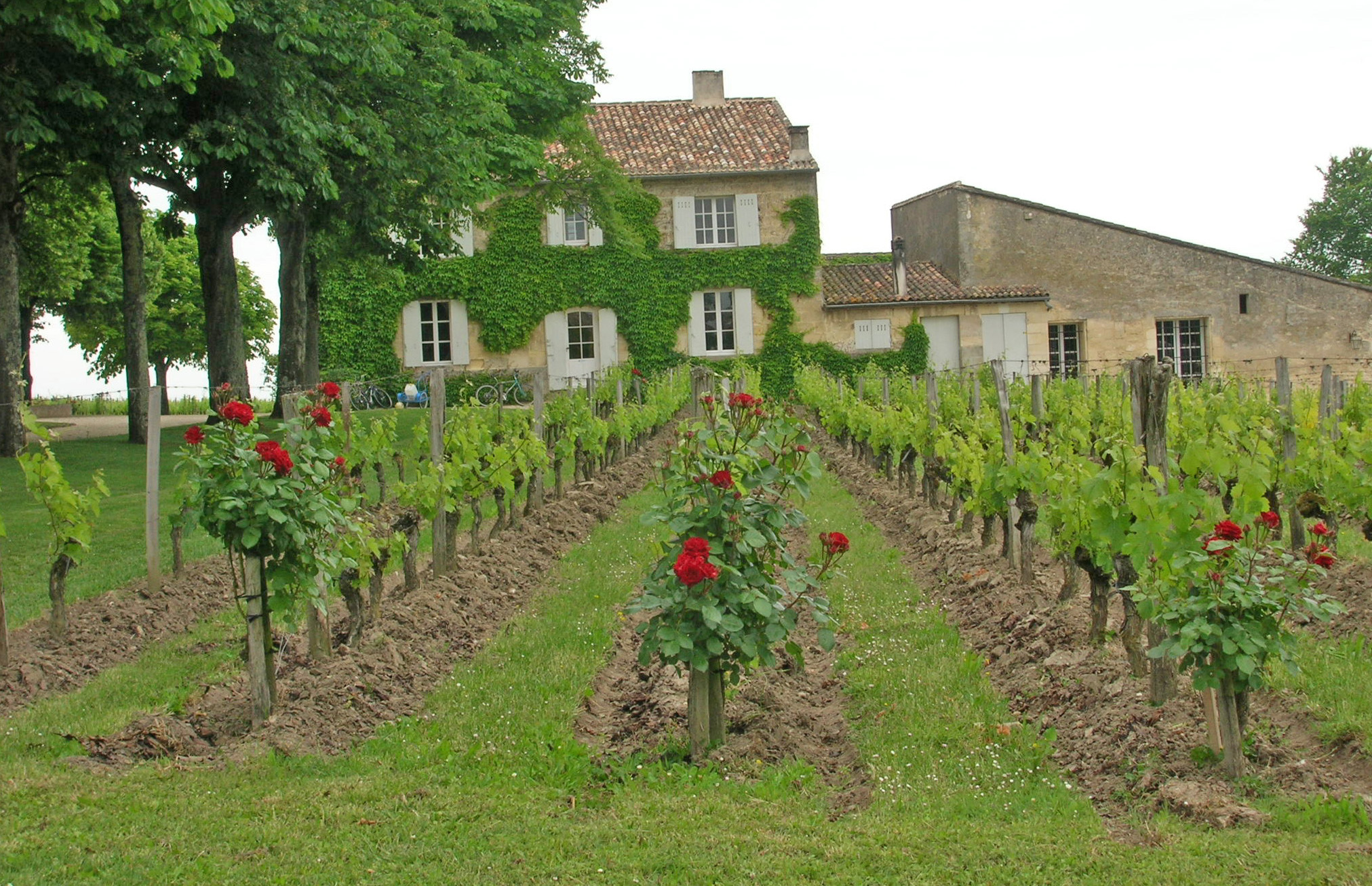
Vineyards in Saint-Émilion

=== Bourg and Blaye ===
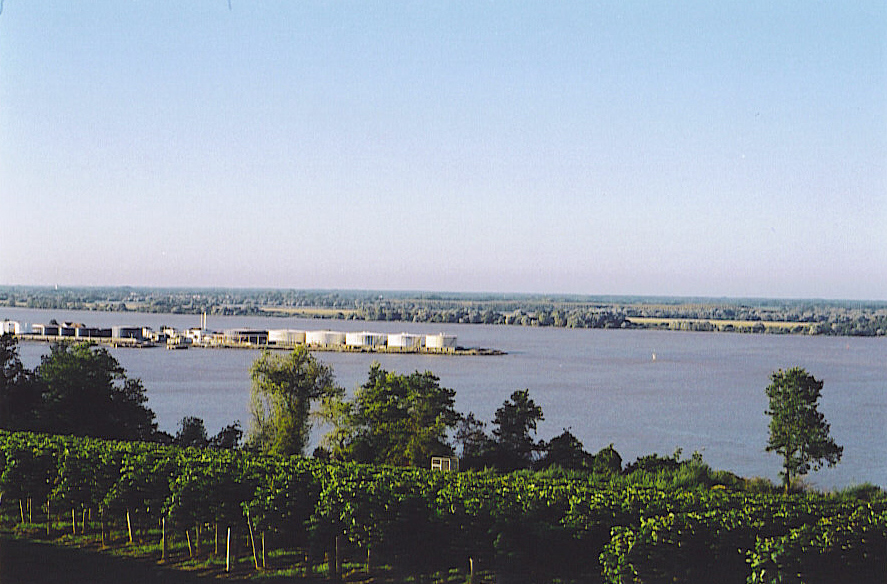
The Garonne and Dordogne rivers meet near Bourg.

North of Libournais, this area sits on the Right Bank of the Garonne and Dordogne rivers and is one of the oldest wine producing regions in Bordeaux, exporting wine long before the Médoc was even planted. Merlot is the main grape of the area followed by Cabernet Sauvignon, Cabernet Franc and Malbec. The area around Bourg also has sizable Sauvignon blanc planting for sparkling wines and Ugni blanc for cognac.

==== The Blayais-Bourgeais appellations ====
- Blaye AOC
- Blaye-Côtes-de-Bordeaux AOC (formerly Premières-côtes-de-Blaye AOC), a sub-appellation of Côtes-de-Bordeaux AOC
- Côtes-de-Bourg

==== Côtes-de-Bourg ====
Historians date the first vineyards from the 2nd century AD, when the Romans planted the first “Vitis Biturica”. The appellation has a range of gravel, alluvium, clay and limestone soils. The wine from Côtes-de-Bourg is mostly red made from a combination of Merlot, Cabernet Sauvignon, Malbec and Cabernet Franc grapes. There is only a small amount of white wine made from Ugni blanc and Colombard grapes. There are around 200 Chateaux producers in the appellation including Chateau Bujan, Chateau Roc de Cambes, Chateau Nodoz, Chateau Fougas Maldoror, Chateau Falfas, Chateau Civrac, Chateau Tayac, Macay, Chateau Rousette, Chateau Haut Maco, Chateau Guiraud.

== Entre-Deux-Mers ==
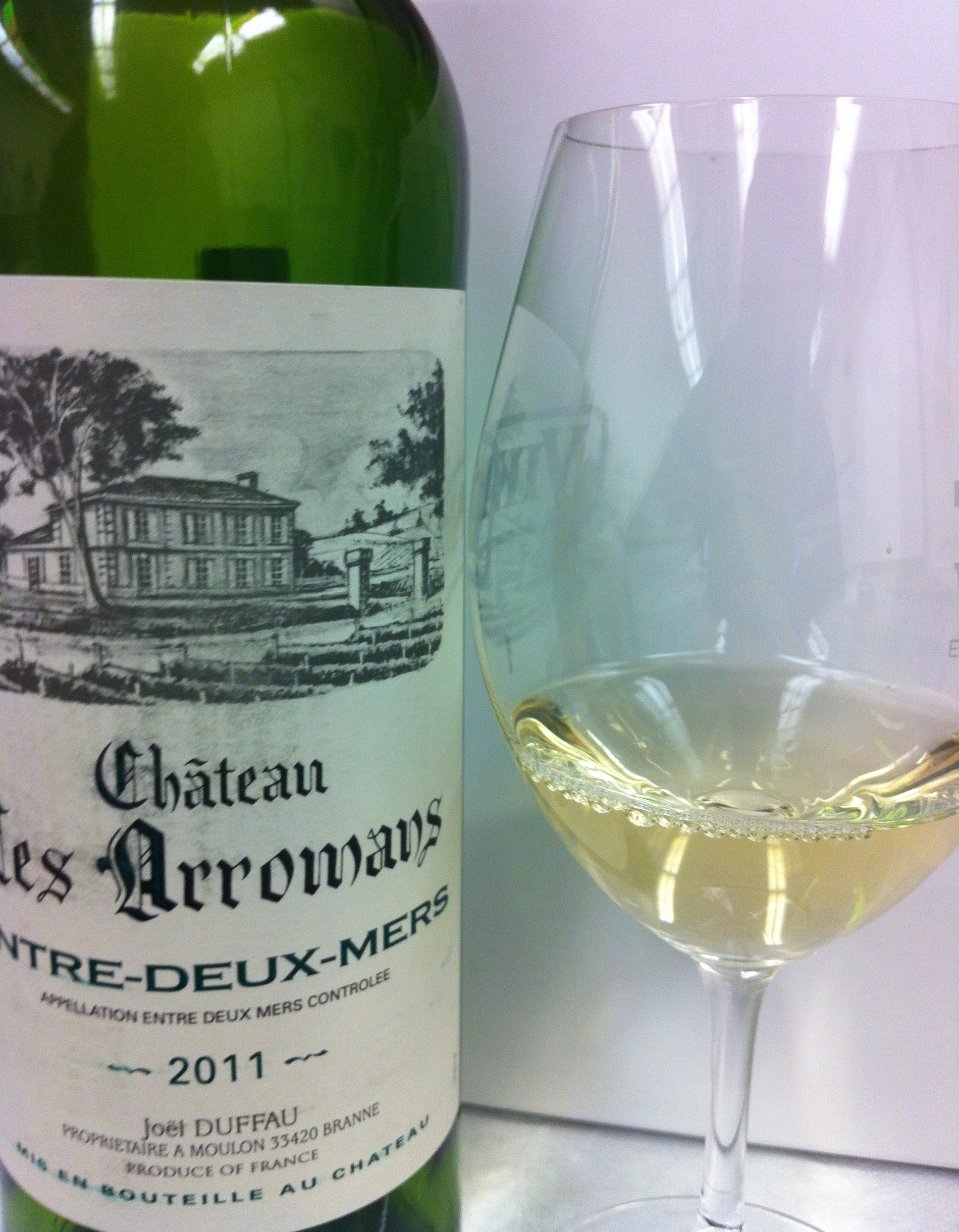
A white Bordeaux from the Entre-Deux-Mers region

Entre-deux-mers literally means between two seas. The term is both a geographical wine area within the Bordeaux region and also separately is a single appellation.

Although both red and white wine is produced in Entre-Deux-Mers, only the dry white carries the appellation d'origine contrôlée (AOC) "Entre-Deux-Mers". The Entre-deux-mers appellation allows only dry white wine. The appellation is one of the largest in the Bordeaux region and is situated between the Garonne and the Dordogne (which are actually considered inland seas).

The Entre-deux-mers geographical wine area is responsible for three quarters of the red wine sold under the generic Bordeaux AOC or Bordeaux supérieur labels.

=== The Entre-Deux-Mers appellations ===
- Entre-Deux-Mers AOC
- Graves de Vayres AOC
- Premières Côtes de Bordeaux AOC (now merged into Côtes-de-Bordeaux AOC)
- Cadillac AOC
- Loupiac AOC
- Sainte-Croix-du-Mont AOC
- Bordeaux-Haut-Benauge AOC
- Entre-Deux-Mers Haut-Benauge AOC
- Côtes-de-Bordeaux-Saint-Macaire AOC
- Sainte-Foy-Bordeaux AOC

== See also ==
- French wine
- History of Bordeaux wine
