= Château Belgrave =

Winery in Bordeaux, France

Coordinates: 45.15134°N 0.78011°W

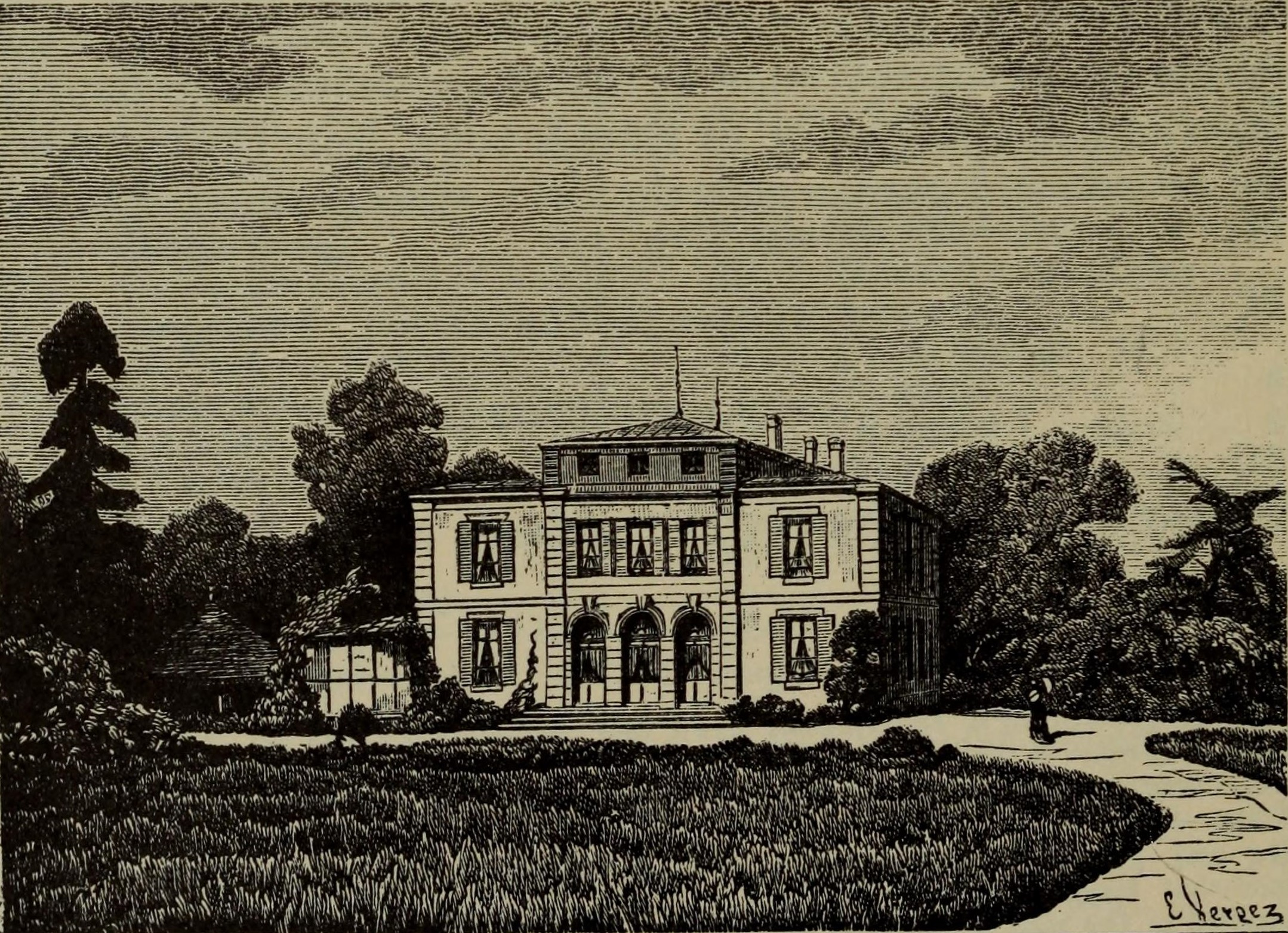
Illustration of Château Belgrave in Bordeaux and its wines by Charles Cocks (author) and Michel-Édouard Féret published en 1883

Château Belgrave (French pronunciation: [ʃato bɛlɡʁav]) is a winery in the Haut-Médoc appellation of the Bordeaux region of France. The wine produced here was classified as one of eighteen Cinquièmes Crus (Fifth Growths) in the Bordeaux Wine Official Classification of 1855. At the time of classification, the winery was called Château Coutenceau. The "Bellegrave" designation first appeared in 1845, when Bruno Devès, a negociant in Bordeaux, remodelled the estate, favoring wine growing on gravel terroirs.

Château Belgrave is located in the commune Saint-Laurent-Médoc, immediately to the west of the border with Saint-Julien-Beychevelle. It is thus situated in a sub-regional appellation, but close to the border of a communal appellation, in similarity to its Fifth Growth Saint neighbours in Saint-Laurent, Château Camensac and Château La Tour Carnet. Its immediate neighbour over the commune border in Saint-Julien is Château Lagrange.

The vineyard of 59 ha is planted with the grape varieties Cabernet Sauvignon (50%), Merlot (42%), Cabernet Franc (5%) and Petit Verdot (3%).

Château Belgrave produces a second wine called Diane de Belgrave, introduced with the 1987 vintage.
