= Grand Jury Européen =

The Grand Jury Européen (GJE) is an Association sans but lucratif (association without lucrative purpose under Luxembourg law) with the aim of providing an alternative classification of wine, founded in 1996 by François Mauss.

The Grand Jury Européen assembles a minimum of 12 permanent members, from at least 6 different countries of the European Union and Switzerland, for blind tasting a maximum of 68 wines in two daily 3-hour sessions. Such events have included the Grand European Jury Wine Tasting of 1997 and the "Judgment of Sauternes" of October, 2006.

The concept of GJE came to Mauss at "6 o'clock on the morning of 29 June 1996", as he sought to develop a method that in several ways was opposite to the approach of Robert Parker, in order to provide an alternative to Parker's scores. Initially Mauss wrote to some 200 Bordeaux châteaux, announcing plans of tasting the 1983, 1985 and 1990 vintages and requested purchase information, but received only three responses, from châteaux Haut-Brion, Pichon Lalande and Sociando-Mallet.

In 2006 Mauss expressed criticism of the Judgment of Paris 30th Anniversary, adding to his reputation as "a dissenting voice in the wine world", also established by the Beaujolais nouveau "vin de merde case".
