= Château Lanessan =

Coordinates: 45.1362°N 0.7534°W

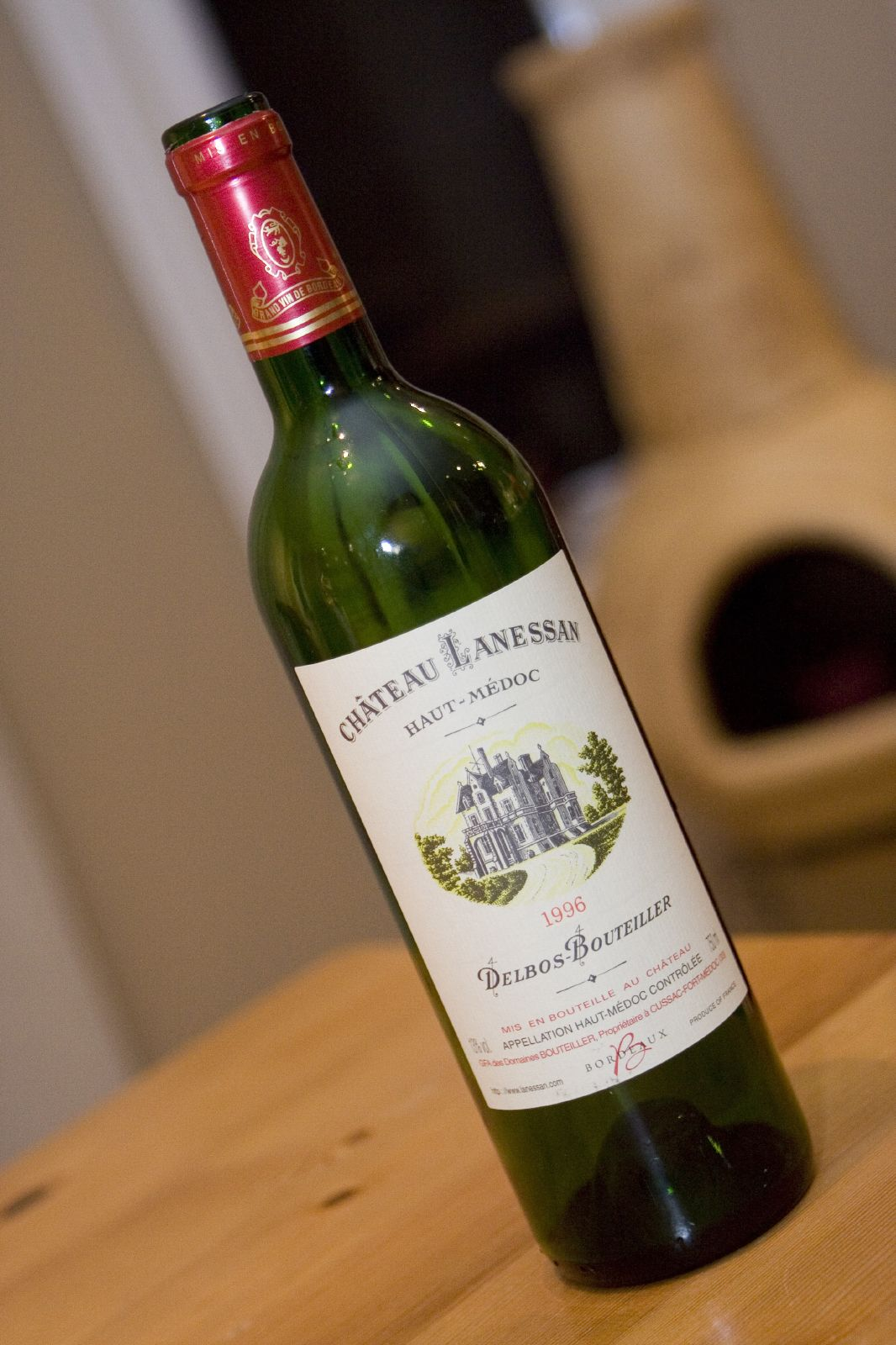
Château Lanessan label

Château Lanessan is a Bordeaux wine estate in the Haut-Médoc appellation, located on the Left Bank of France’s Bordeaux wine regions in the commune of Cussac near Fort Médoc. The estate held a rating of Cru Bourgeois Supérieur, until this specific classification was annulled. Some critics have suggested that it ought to be elevated to a higher classification.

Lanessan has also produced a second wine Les Calèches de Lanessan (English: "Carriages of Lanessan") since 1999, emphasising the château's ties with horses.

== History ==
The earliest documentation indicate Dame Paironne la Montagne, the widow of Henry de Lanessan, sold the estate on January 15, 1310 to Sieur de Blaignan. It was acquired in 1793 by Jean Delbos, previously a ship owner. In the 19th century Lanessan (then named Dubosqc) was listed as a Quatrieme cru by Lawton in 1815 and received highly favourable mentions in Cocks & Féret. Following a decision by Jean Delbos' son Louis, Lanessan did not to submit samples to the Bordeaux Wine Official Classification of 1855, in the belief that the World's Fair ranking would add nothing to the estate's already sound reputation, and that the selection amounted to "bureaucratic nonsense".

In 1858 the cellarmaster of Château Lanessan, Jean Pineau, was hired by the Spanish Marqués de Riscal to come to the Rioja to improve the quality of the Spanish wines.

Château de Lanessan was built 1878 by André Delbos in a mock-Tudor style, and its cellars built in traditional Médoc style. Additionally the estate was expanded to include stables that are the foundation for the Musée du Cheval, currently a tourism destination. Following the marriage between Marie-Louise Delbos and Etienne Bouteiller in 1907, the family name changed, and in 1961 Jean Bouteiller started to expand the family's holding, initially acquiring Château Lachesnaye, and Château de Sainte Gemme in 1962.

Treasury Wine Estates (TWE) Australia acquired a majority stake in Château Lanessan completing the purchase in October 2022. The acquisition includes the historic estate, all 80 hectares of vineyards across the 3 sites, and winery facilities, which was a strategic move to significantly increase Penfolds's production capacity in France and expand its multi-regional luxury wine portfolio.

== Production ==
The vineyard area extends to 40 hectares (99 acres), with a grape variety distribution of 60% Cabernet Sauvignon, 30% Merlot, 5% Cabernet Franc and 5% Petit Verdot. An average of 220,000 bottles of the Grand vin are produced per year.

== Château Lachesnaye ==
Lachesnaye also held a rating of Cru Bourgeois Supérieur while this classification was in effect. A neighbouring estate of Lanessan, Château Lachesnaye is currently owned by the Bouteiller family as well.

Domaine de Lachesnaye, a former seigneurial land in the parish of Sainte Gemme, belonged in 1793 to the Caupène family, who had inherited it from Sire de La Chesnaye. The estate was bought by Frédéric Exshaw in 1880, who had a château built resembling that of Lanessan. Weakened by the economic crisis of 1929, and frosts of 1945 and 1956, the estate was acquired by Jean Bouteiller in 1961, and a large proportion of the vines were replanted. Château Lachesnaye resumed wine production in 1971.

The vineyard area extends 20 hectares (49 acres), planted with 50% Cabernet Sauvignon and 50% Merlot. Lachesnaye also produces a second wine, Sire de Lachesnaye.

== Château de Sainte Gemme ==
Situated east of Château Lachesnaye, south of Château Beychevelle and north of the vineyards of Château Ducru Beaucaillou, Château de Sainte Gemme previously belonged to the owners of Château Lachesnaye, who sold its wine under the Lachesnaye name. The estate was acquired in 1962 by Jean Bouteiller, who began production under the Sainte Gemme label in 1982.

The vineyard area extends 10 hectares (25 acres), with the grape variety selection split evenly between 50% Cabernet Sauvignon and 50% Merlot. An average 65,000 bottles are produced annually.
