= Château Cantemerle =

Winery in the Bordeaux region of France

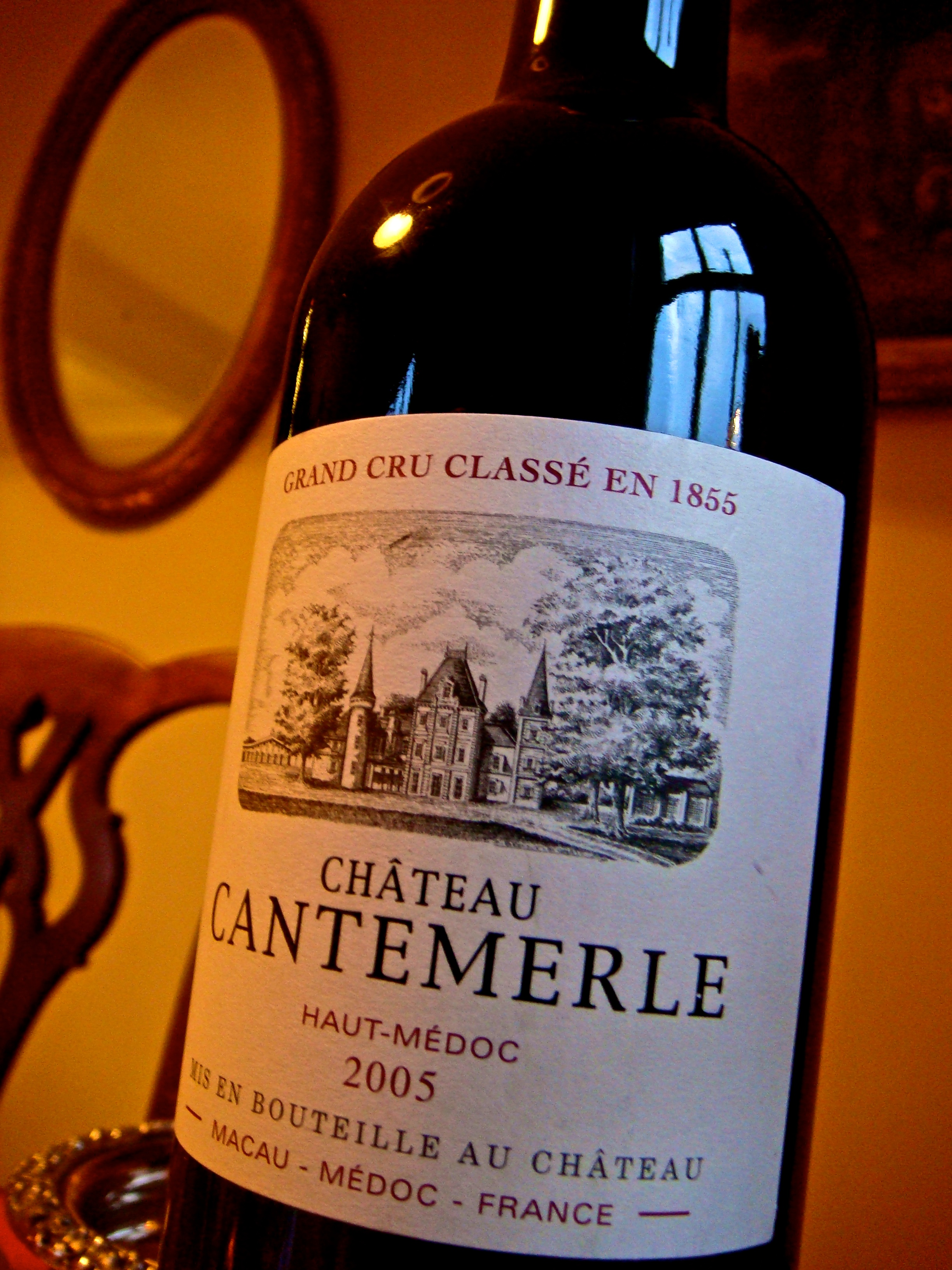
- Location: Macau
- Coordinates: 44.99370°N 0.62466°W
- Wine region: Bordeaux
- Appellation: Haut-Médoc AOC
- Area cultivated: 90 hectares (220 acres)
- Cases/yr: 25,000 (Grand vin); 12,500 (Les Allées)
- Known for: Château Cantemerle (Grand vin); Les Allées de Cantemerle (second); Baronne Caroline (third)
- Varietals: Cabernet Sauvignon, Merlot, Cabernet Franc, Petit Verdot
- Website: cantemerle.com

Château Cantemerle is a winery in the Haut-Médoc appellation of the Bordeaux wine region of France, in the commune of Macau. The wine produced here was the final estate to be classified as one of eighteen Cinquièmes Crus (Fifth Growths) in the Bordeaux Wine Official Classification of 1855. Its absence from the classification map featured at the 1855 Exposition Universelle de Paris created some controversy, even though it has been listed on all maps published after 1855. Some sources will include an asterisk next to Château Cantemerle listing in reference to this controversy. The estate has a long history in the Haut-Médoc with records detailing its existence since at least the 12th century and wine production since at least the 14th century. In the 19th century, the estate was hard hit by the phylloxera epidemic as well as grapevine attacks of downy mildew, after which production dropped nearly 50%. Towards the end of the 20th century, the estate was sold to French insurance group Les Mutuelles d'Assurance du Bâtiment et des Travaux Public who have contributed significant investment in the estate's vineyards and winemaking facilities.

== Listing controversy ==
In the past, the status of Château Cantemerle as an original 1855 classification wine had been erroneously questioned since it was not included in the first publication of the classification, nor was it shown on the map that was displayed at the 1855 Exposition Universelle de Paris. It has in fact been included in all listings dated after 16 September 1855. This was the result of an intense lobbying effort by Caroline de Villeneuve-Durfort who had supplied documentation to the brokers originally responsible for the price-based 1855 classification. Hence, its entry in the classification today is often accompanied by an asterisk denoting the only change in the classification that had occurred in more than 110 years. The second, and so far only other change, occurred in 1973 with the elevation of Château Mouton Rothschild from Second Growth to First Growth status.

== History ==
The property has a long pedigree, with the first mention as early as 1147, of the Pons de Cantemerle. In the Middle Ages, the original chateau was part of a line of fortifications defending the banks of the left side of the river Gironde. Later, with Aquitaine ruled by the English, the Lord of Cantemerle fought on the side of the English Henry III against the King of France. In 1241 he fought and lost the Battle of Taillebourg. His domain remained under his rule and his descendant, Ponset de Cantemerle was Lord of the seigneury in 1340.

Mention of viticulture dates back to 1354 with the Ponset de Cantemerle recorded as paying debt in wine, a tonneau of clairet.

In the fifteenth century, the feudal domain of Cantemerle belonged to the Caupène family, originally from the Landes region. According to a title deed of 1422, the squire Jean de Caupène was described as Lord of Cantemerle. His son, Médard de Caupène, later became Lord until the end of the fifteenth century.

In 1579 it was purchased by Jean de Villeneuve, second president of the parliament of Bordeaux, who married into the Durfort Family. The Durforts controlled this and other châteaux for many centuries, increasingly focusing on wine, rather than the polycultural agriculture of old.

=== Later history ===
Château Cantemerle presentation card dated 1931, still attached to the Villeneuve name, demonstrating the designs of the early 20th century, the label, cork, case and capsule markings.

On 19 September 1855, the chamber of commerce classed it as a fifth growth. A. d'Armailhacq recounts in his work Vines in the Médoc that, in 1858, the estate of Cantemerle covered 225 acres (0.91 km^{2}). Some of the vines were planted in Ludon, next to those of la Château La Lagune, while the remainder were situated on the best slopes of Macau. Annual production was 160 tons or tonneaux of principal wine and 30 of second wine, representing a yield of approximately 1900 litres per 2.47 acres (10,000 m^{2}), relatively low in comparison with today's production.

In 1866, the surface area given over to vines was a tenure of just over 270 acres (of the property's total of 1000 acres ), producing an average 150 to 160 tonneaux, or Bordeaux casks, of principal wine and 50 to 60 of second wine – that is, a yield of 1800 litres per 2.47 acres (10,000 m^{2}) and, thus, slightly less than that of 1858.

In 1867, the château Cantemerle received a silver medal at the World Fair in Paris as a reward for the quality of its wine.

Cantemerle was not only the worst hit of the Médoc classified growths during the phylloxera crisis, but the vines were also attacked by downy mildew between 1879 and 1887. Consequently, potential average annual production dropped by 50% (in comparison with the bench mark period of 1864 to 1878). In 1884, mildew was responsible for a complete upheaval in the usual hierarchy of the great growths. The wines of Margaux, Cantenac, Ludon and Macau fared better than those of Saint-Julien Pauillac and Saint-Estèphe. Consequently, the price obtained for 1884 Lafite fell to 1400 francs per tonneau (compared with 5000 francs for Margaux) and Cantemerle was one of two fifth growths, the other being Dauzac, to fetch 200 francs more per tonneau than the Lafite wines.

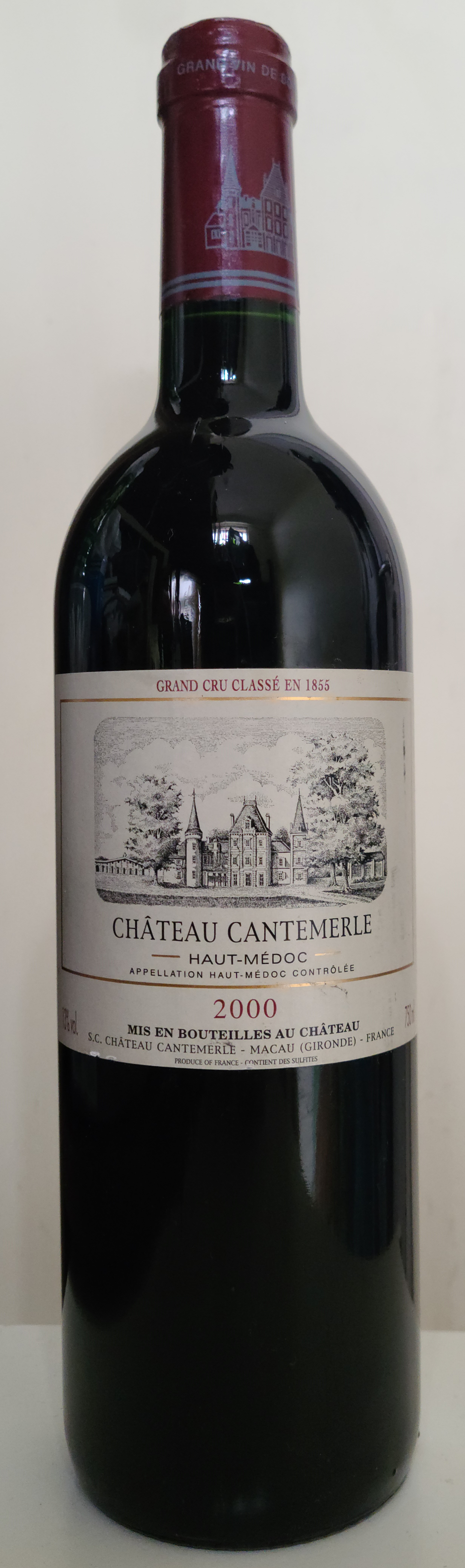
Grand Vin 2000

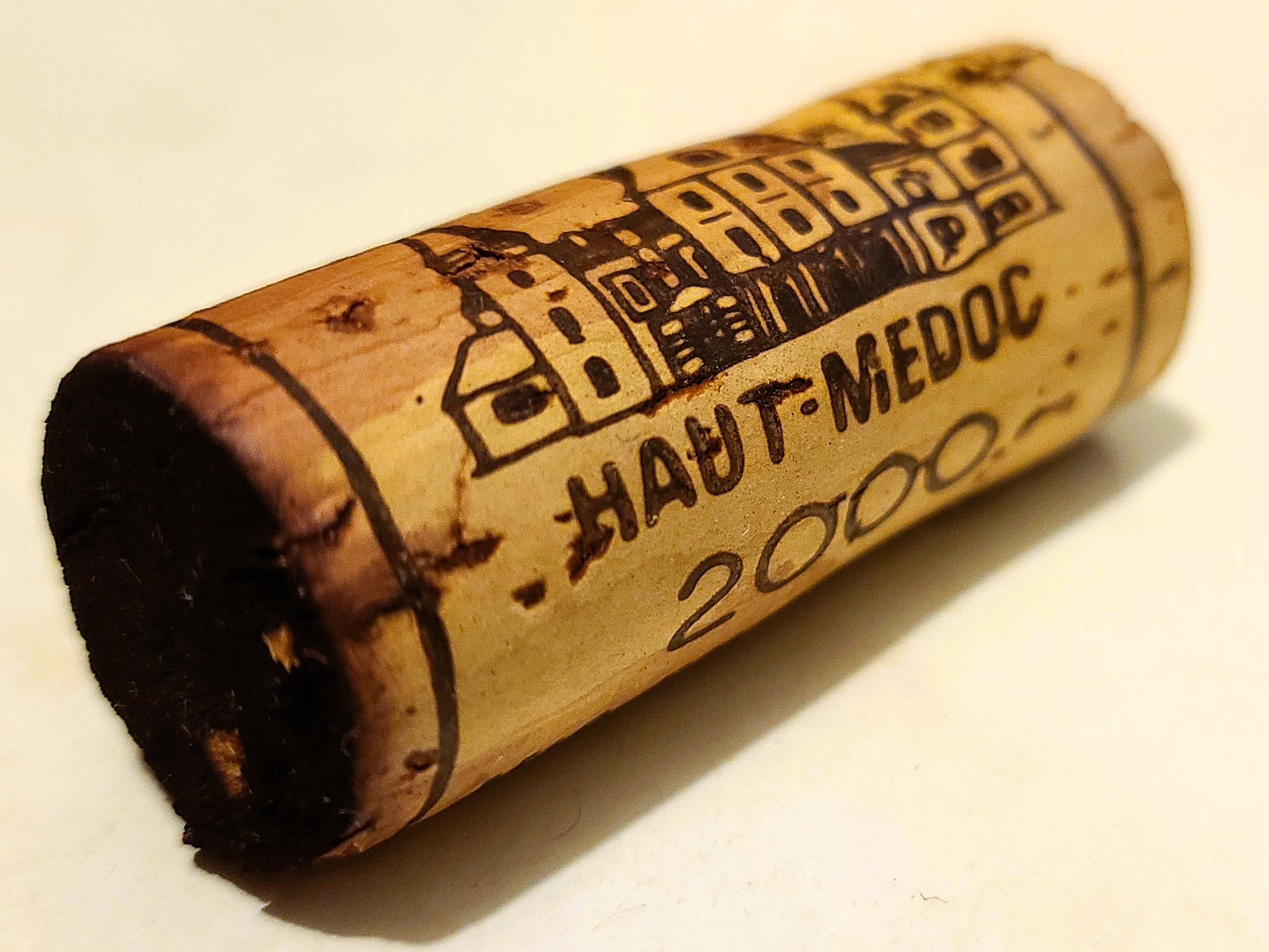
Cork of 2000

In 1892, the Villeneuve-Durfort family sold the property to Théophile-Jean Dubos, and the estate was passed on to his son Pierre J. Dubos who was considered one of the great proprietors of his generation, and a keeper of meticulous weather records. After his death, he was succeeded by his son-in-law, Henri Binaud, but with ownership split between several heirs, there became a shortage of funds for investment.

=== Modern day ===
In 1981 the estate was sold by the Dubos family to le Groupe SMABTP (Les Mutuelles d'Assurance du Bâtiment et des Travaux Public). Following the acquisition, the cuvier was virtually rebuilt, extensive repairs were made to the chai, and a scheme to replant the vineyards was begun. At the time of its purchase, the estate was in near ruins. Of the 115 hectares (284 acres) that were planted when the estate was classified in 1855, only 20 ha (49 acres) were in working condition in 1980. After purchasing the estate for 25 million francs (US$5.9 million), the new owners invested heavily in reviving the estate spending nearly 60 million francs (about US$8 million) in the 1980s planting an additional 70 hectares (174 acres) and purchasing new oak barrels to replace the use of stainless steel tanks in production of the estate's first wine. New harvesting and grape sorting equipment was installed which made the estate more efficient in separating out less desirable grapes.

In the vineyards, the managing partners of Château Cantemerle brought over teams of Mexican vineyard workers from California to assist in grafting and replanting the vineyards. Believing that the talents of Mexican workers would lead to higher success ratio, the estate converted the majority of weaker Cabernet franc plantings into increased acreage of Cabernet Sauvignon and Petit Verdot.

== Grand Contournement opposition ==
Château Cantemerle, particularly its director Philippe Dambrine, were in ardent opposition to a plan by the French government to build a Grand Contournement road that was to pass through the Médoc as well as Côtes de Bourg and Blaye. The plan, which was initially approved in 2004, would have included construction that divided Château Cantemerle's vineyards in half. (Some versions of the plan would have called for the demolition of the estate itself) As of March 2007, there have been no further development on the plans.

== Production ==
Today the Chateau owns 190 hectares (470 acres) of land and 90 (222 acres) of those are planted with vines. Of these, 87 (215 acres) are under production. The grape varieties cultivated are mainly 50% Cabernet Sauvignon and 40% Merlot, with additional 5% of Cabernet Franc and 5% Petit Verdot. On average, the vines are 30 years old.

The Chateau annually produces on average 25,000 cases of its Grand vin, and 12,500 cases of its second wine, Les Allées de Cantemerle. Depending on the vintage, a third wine might also be produced-Baronne Caroline with a production between 5,000 and 10,000 cases.

== Wine ==
According to wine writer Tom Stevenson in The Sotheby's Wine Encyclopedia, Château Cantemerle wines are characterized by rich, oaky, fruit flavors that balance well. The wines have good coloring for a classified Bordeaux wine and typically reach their peak between 8 and 20 years. The typical blend is a composition of 50% Cabernet Sauvignon, 40% Merlot, 5% Cabernet Franc and 5% Petit Verdot.
