= Haut-Médoc AOC =

Wine AOC in Bordeaux, France

- Wine region
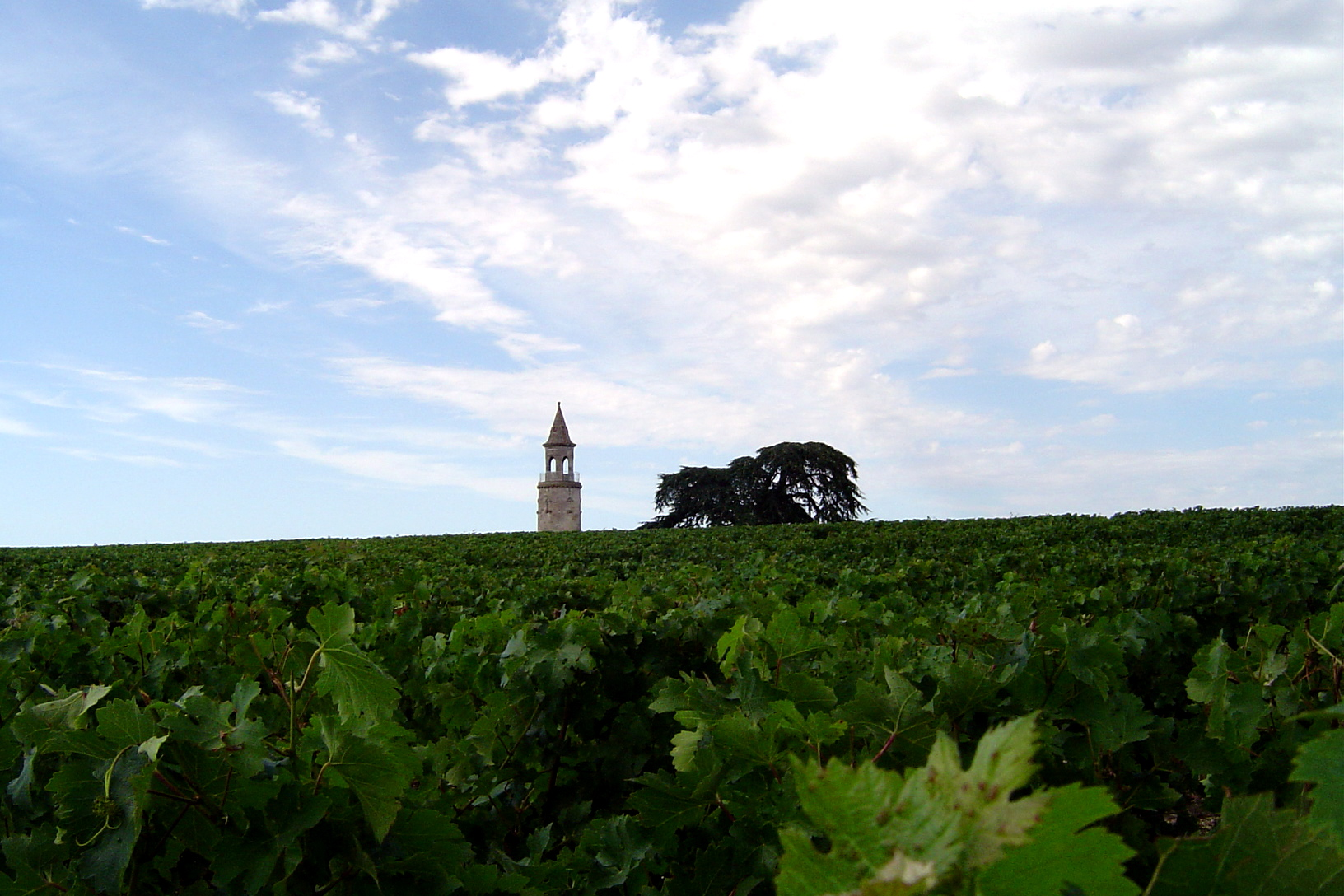
- Type: Appellation d'origine contrôlée
- Year established: 1936
- Country: France
- Part of: Bordeaux Left Bank, Médoc AOC
- Sub-regions: Saint-Estèphe AOC, Pauillac AOC, Saint-Julien AOC, Listrac-Médoc AOC, Moulis-en-Médoc AOC, Margaux AOC
- Climate region: Oceanic climate
- Soil conditions: gravel, chalk, clay
- Total area: 4,657 ha (11,510 acres)
- No. of vineyards: 392
- Grapes produced: Cabernet Sauvignon, Merlot, Petit Verdot, Malbec, Cabernet Franc, Carménère
- Wine produced: 32,600,000 bottles 217,656 hl (5,749,900 US gal)

Haut-Médoc (French: [o medɔk]) is an Appellation d'Origine Contrôlée (AOC) for wine in the Bordeaux wine region of southwestern France, on the Left Bank of the Gironde estuary. Covering a large part of the viticultural strip of land along the Médoc peninsula, the zone covers approximately 60 kilometres (37 mi) of its length.

As defined by the original Institut National des Appellations d'Origine (INAO) decree of November 14, 1936, its southern edge borders the city of Bordeaux and the Médoc AOC to the north, encompassing fifteen communes exclusive to the appellation, while at the same time it enclaves six appellations made up of nine communes (Saint-Estèphe AOC, Pauillac AOC, Saint-Julien AOC, Listrac-Médoc AOC, Moulis-en-Médoc AOC and Margaux AOC) that are technically wine-making communes of Haut-Médoc. Similarly, Haut-Médoc is a sub-appellation of the Médoc AOC.

Of Haut-Médoc's fifteen wine-producing communes, eight are located along the waterfront of Garonne and Gironde: Blanquefort, Parempuyre, Ludon, Macau, Arcins, Lamarque, Cussac and Saint-Seurin-de-Cadourne. Seven communes lie inland: Le Taillan, Le Pian-Médoc, Avensan, Saint-Laurent-Médoc. Saint-Sauveur, Cissac and Vertheuil.

Few of the estates falling within the generic Haut-Médoc appellation were included in the Bordeaux Wine Official Classification of 1855 (as all but six of the 61 are located within the AOCs Margaux, Saint-Julien, Pauillac and Saint-Estèphe), but several were included in the classification Cru Bourgeois.

== History ==
For most of its history, the Haut-Médoc was a vast region of salt marshes used for animal grazing rather than viticulture. In the 17th century, Dutch merchants began an ambitious drainage project to convert the marshland into a usable vineyard area. Their objective was to provide the British market a wine alternative to the Graves and Portuguese wines that were dominating the market. Using technology that was advanced for that time, the Dutch were able to convert enough marshland to allow large estates to form all along the Gironde. Soon the Bordeaux wine regions of Margaux, Saint-Julien, Pauillac and Saint-Estèphe took shape. By the 19th century, the wine region of the Haut-Médoc was one of the most prosperous in France, with wines that had an international reputation that would be unparalleled till the late 20th century.

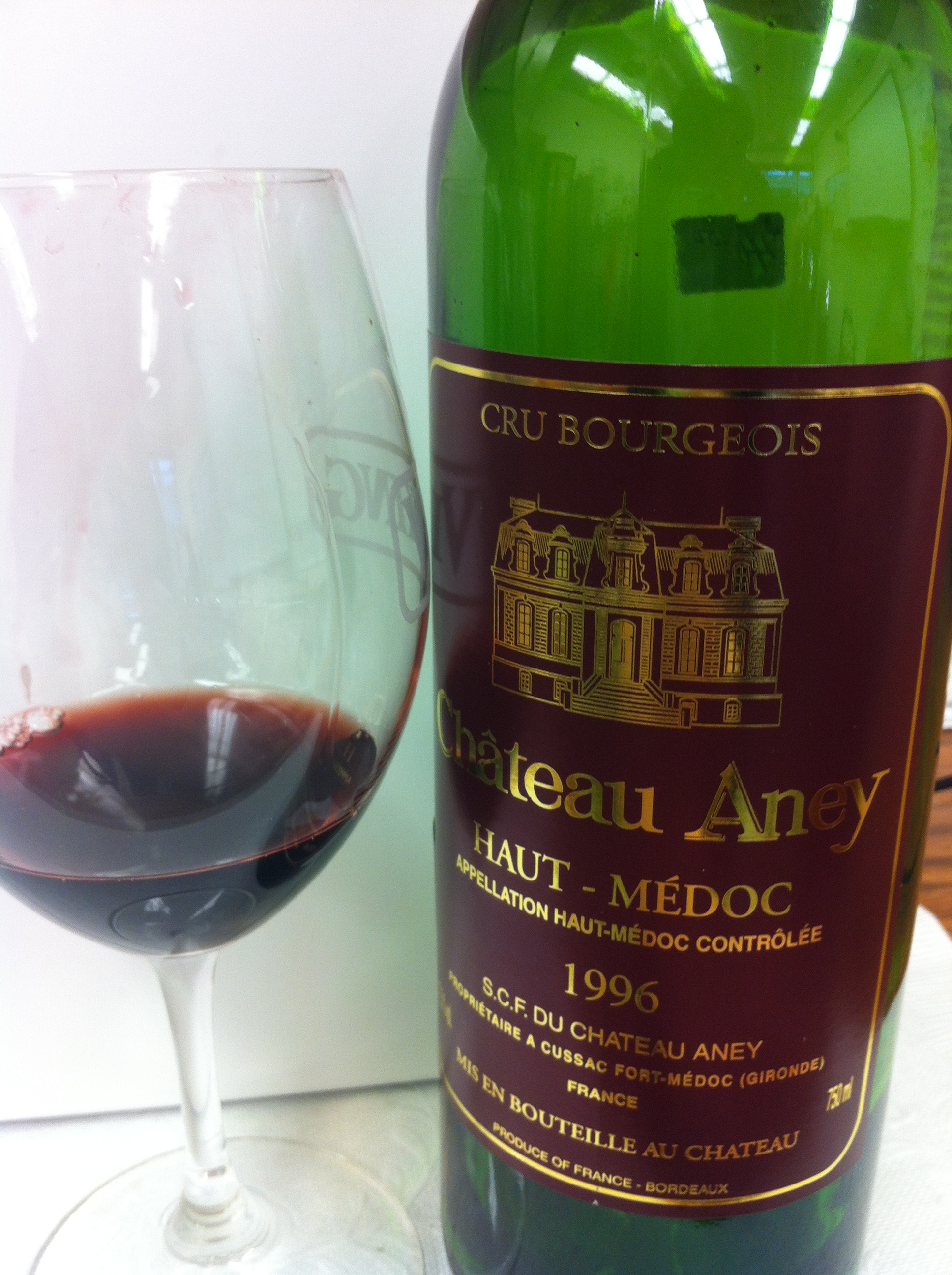
A Cru Bourgeois wine from the Haut-Médoc.

The area covers approximately 4,600 hectares of declared vineyards, constituting 28.5% of the Médoc total, annually producing on average 255,000 hectolitres of wine. The variation in types of soil is greater than other appellations in the region, ranging from less than ideal terrain, to conditions on a par with some of the enclaved appellations of more celebrated reputation.

Of the permitted grape varieties of Haut-Médoc, 52% of the viticultural area is planted with Cabernet Sauvignon, with additional cultivation of Merlot, Petit Verdot and to a small degree Malbec (locally called "Cot"). Also permitted under the regulations of the AOC are the varieties Cabernet Franc and Carménère.

The INAO specifications demand the following production norms: a high planting density, a minimum of 6,500 plants per hectare, and minimum of sugar, 178 g (6.3 oz) per litre of must, maximum base yield of 48 hectolitres per hectare, and a minimum alcohol by volume of 10%.

=== Estates ===
Of the 392 viticultural properties of Haut-Médoc, 150 participate in winemaking cooperatives, the other 242 being independent wineries.

Troisièmes Crus
Château La Lagune
Quatrièmes Crus
Château La Tour Carnet
Cinquièmes Crus
Château Belgrave	Château Cantemerle	Château de Camensac	
Cru Bourgeois^{[a]}
Château Agassac Chateau Aney	Château Arche	Château Beaumont	Château Bel-Orme
Château Cambon La Pelouse	Château Caronne Ste-Gemme	Château Cissac	
Château Citran	Château Coufran	Château Hanteillan	
Château Lachesnaye	Château Lamothe-Bergeron	Château Lanessan	
Château Liversan	Château Larose	Château Malescasse	
Château Ramage La Batisse	Château Trintaudon	Château Sénéjac	
Château Verdignan	Domaine de Cartujac		
Unclassified
Château Sociando-Mallet	Domaine Andron		

== Notes ==
a. Cru Bourgeois as a term of classification since 1932, was annulled in 2007, and reintroduced in 2009.
