= Château Cissac =

Vineyard in Cissac-Médoc, France

Coordinates: 45.22623°N 0.82821°W

Château Cissac is a winery in the Haut-Médoc appellation of the Bordeaux wine region of France. Cissac produces long-lived red wines and is classified as a Cru Bourgeois. The Château is owned by the Vialard family.

== See also ==
- Bordeaux wine
