= Château Sociando-Mallet =

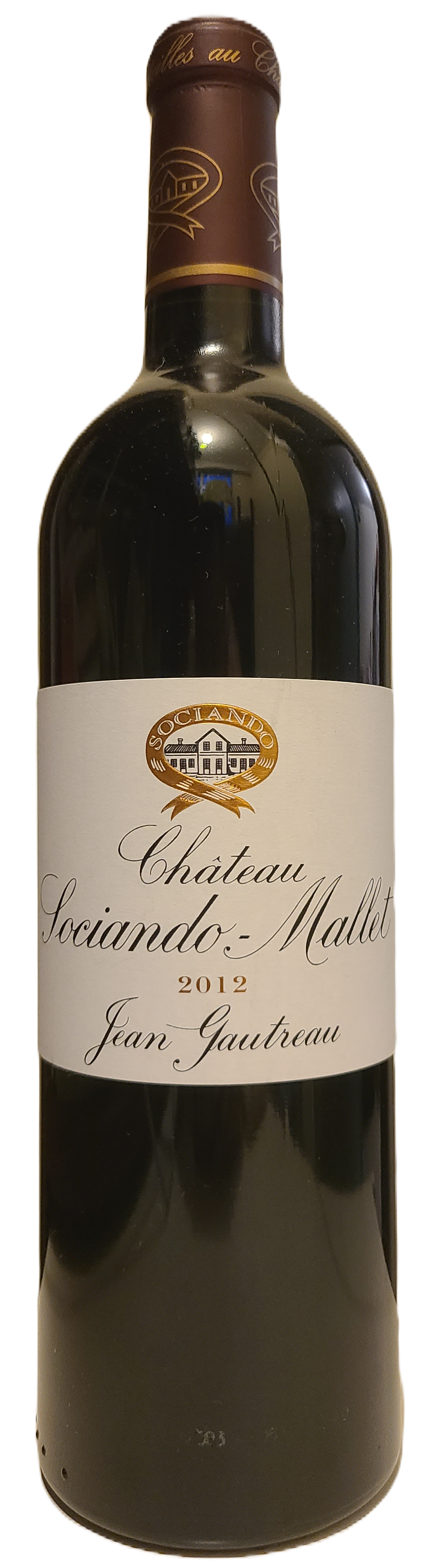
Grand Vin 2012

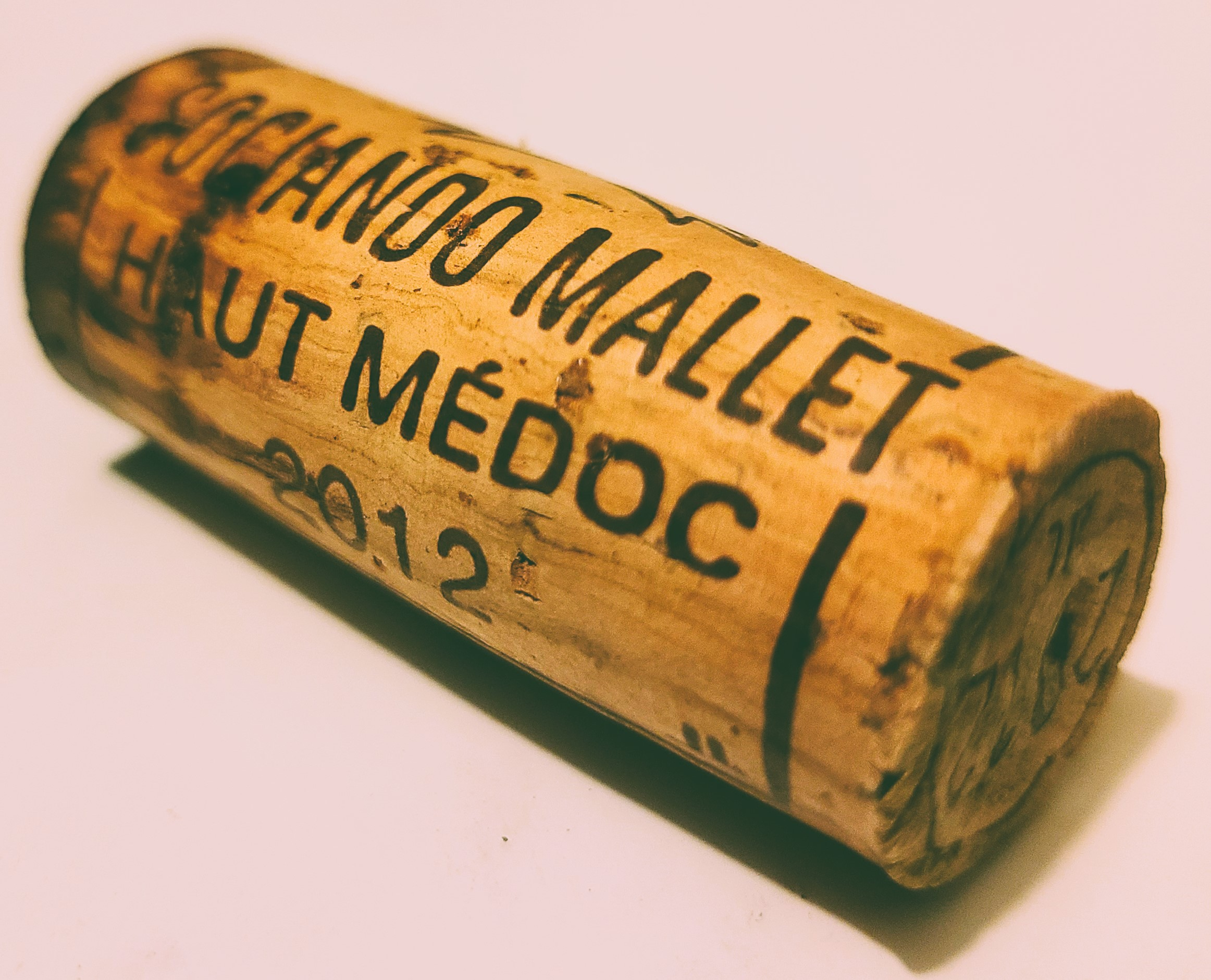
Cork

Château Sociando-Mallet is an unclassed Bordeaux wine producer from the appellation Haut-Médoc. The winery is located on the Left Bank of the Bordeaux wine regions, in the commune of Saint-Seurin-de-Cadourne north of Saint-Estèphe, France. Despite its estimation as a producer of high quality wine, it was neither ranked in the Bordeaux Wine Official Classification of 1855 (not existing at the time), nor is it listed among Médoc's Cru Bourgeois, due to a decision of its owner Jean Gautreau not to enter it for such classification.

The winery also produces a second wine named La Demoiselle de Sociando-Mallet.

== History ==
Situated on what was in 1633 the residence of a Basque nobleman named Sièvre Sociando, the first documentation of the estate mentions its nobles terres. After its acquisition around 1850 by Madame Mallet, it was recorded in the 1883 edition of Cocks & Féret along with Château Verdignan as the leading cru of Saint-Seurin.

Sociando-Mallet was a forgotten and derelict property of vastly reduced land by the time it was bought by Jean Gautreau, a négociant from Lesparre, in 1969. The estate has since seen considerable expansion and modernisation, and enjoys high prices and a good reputation in today's wine market.

== Production ==
The vineyard extends to 50 hectares, with the grape varieties of 55% Cabernet Sauvignon, 40% Merlot and 5% Cabernet Franc. An average of 20,000 cases of the Grand vin are produced per year.
