= Château Pape Clément =

Bordeaux wine

Coordinates: 44.80571°N 0.64683°W

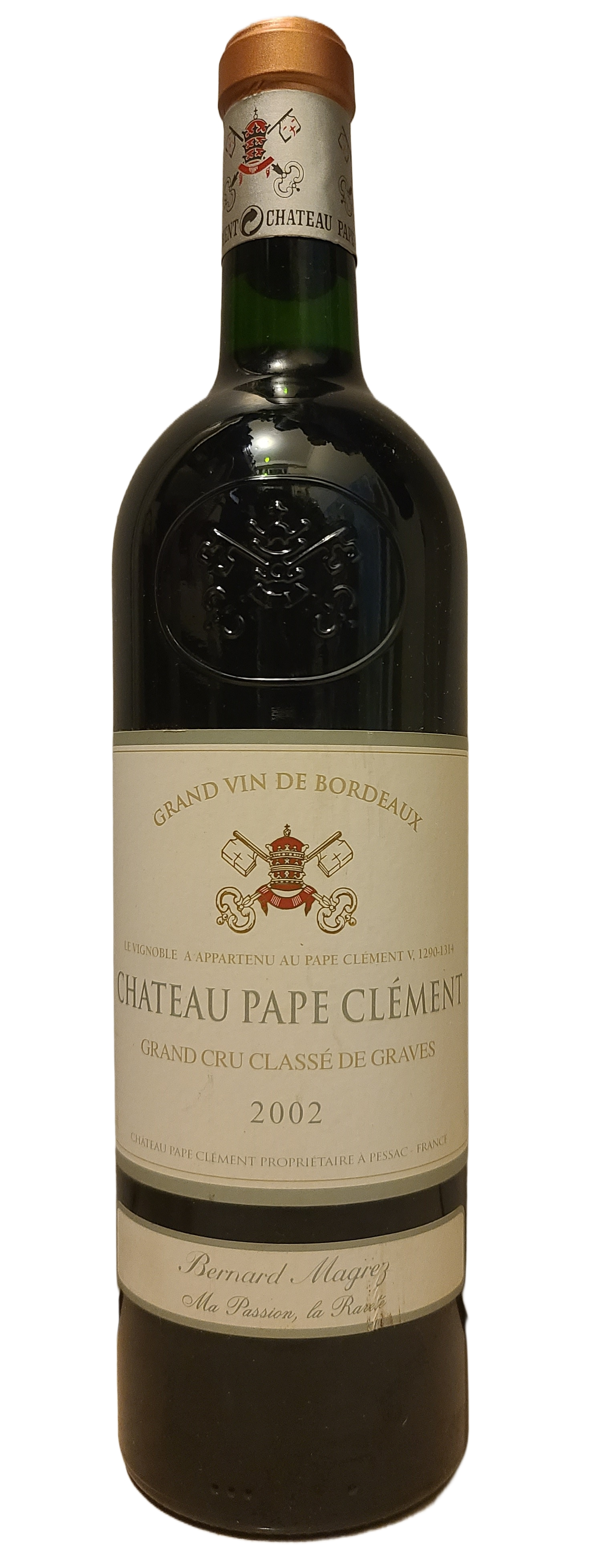
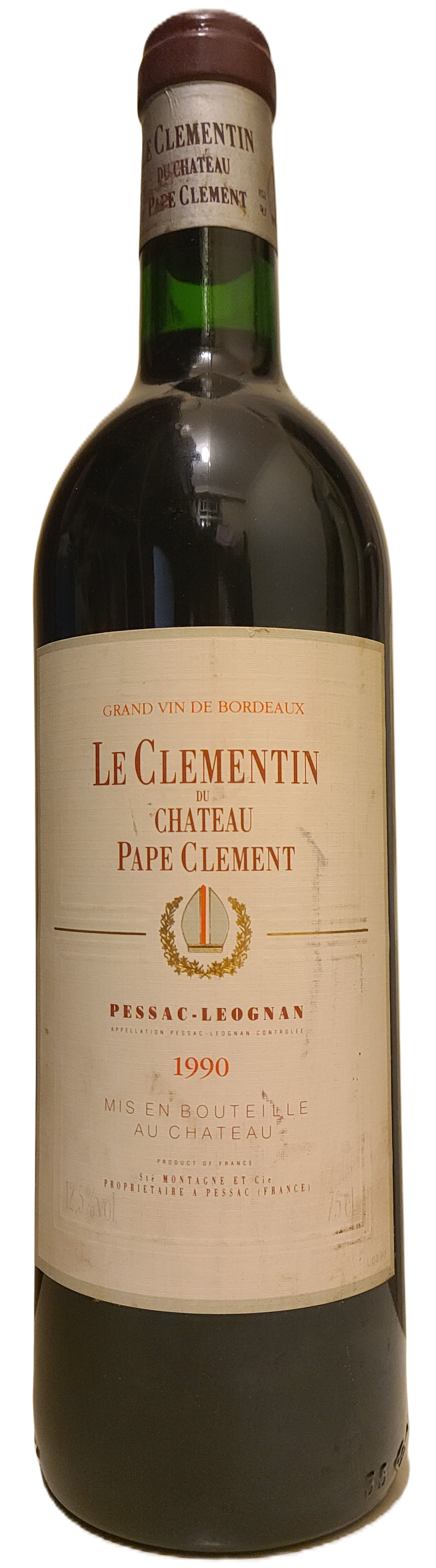
Grand Vin of 2002 (left); second wine of 1990 (right)

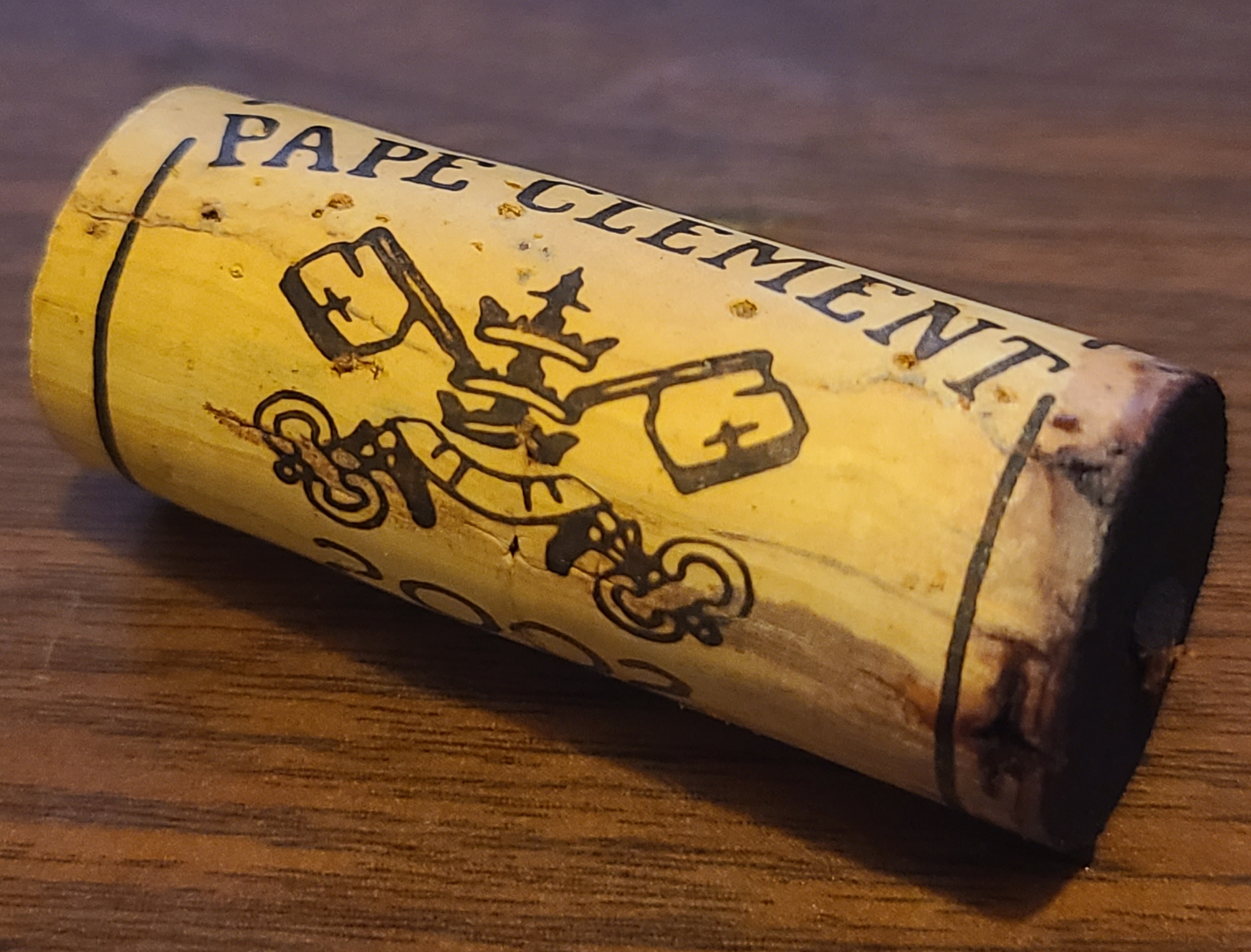
Cork

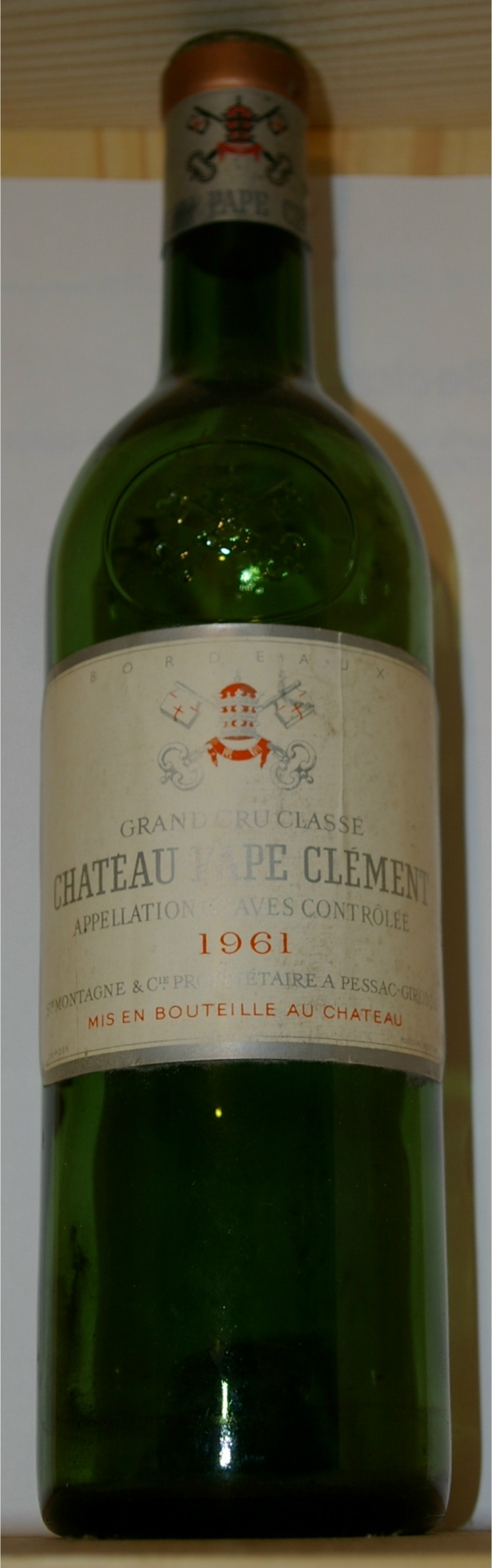
1961 bottle of Château Pape Clément

Château Pape Clément (French: [ʃɑto pap klemɑ̃]) is a Bordeaux wine from the Pessac-Léognan appellation, ranked among the Crus Classés for red wine in the classification of Graves wine of 1959. It is the oldest wine estate in Bordeaux, harvesting its 700th vintage in 2006. The winery and vineyards are located in the commune of Pessac, southwest of the city of Bordeaux. When the estate was omitted from the initial Graves classification of 1953 it caused some controversy.

== History ==
Planted in 1300, the estate is the oldest planted vineyard in the region, when it was presented to Bertrand de Goth upon his appointment as archbishop of Bordeaux, by his brother, Berald. It received its name from Bertrand's papal name, Clement V; on his election in 1306 he gave the estate to his successor as archbishop, Cardinal Arnaud de Canteloup. Bertrand, who would later move the papacy to Avignon near Châteauneuf-du-Pape, planted this original vineyard with red wine grapes. White wine grapes were planted across the river near the town of Lormont. The vineyard remained in the possession of archbishops of Bordeaux until the Revolution, when it was nationalised and sold as a bien national.

After the Revolution, a succession of owners oversaw the development of the property as a commercial enterprise, and by the middle of the 19th century the estate was widely regarded to be second only to Haut-Brion, though under the ownership and expansions of Jean-Baptiste Clerc from 1858 to his death just before 1880, the wines of Pape-Clément were selling at a price equivalent to a Médoc second growth. Later owners, including an Englishman named Maxwell who neglected the estate, experienced difficult times, with hail devastation in 1937, the onset of World War II and the expansions of the suburbs of Bordeaux coming closer.

The estate was eventually revitalised under the ownership of the vigneron and poet Paul Montagne who arrived in 1939. In need of reconstituting the vineyards from the scratch, the results of improvement were not seen until 1949. Having engaged the services of oenologist Émile Peynaud, the wines of Pape-Clément have been viewed as increasingly successful, and has been described by David Peppercorn as the most important vineyard of Pessac-Talence behind Haut-Brion and La Mission.

Following the death of Paul Montagne at 94, his son Léo Montagne has joint-ownership of the estate, partnered with Bernard Magrez, owner of Château La Tour Carnet. The estate currently employs the flying winemaker Michel Rolland as a consultant.

== Production ==
The vineyard area consists of 32.5 hectares, 30 of which are planted with grape varieties of 60% Cabernet Sauvignon and 40% Merlot. The remaining plots are cultivated with white varieties of 45% Sauvignon blanc, 45% Sémillon and 10% Muscadelle.

The Grand vin, Chateau Pape Clément, is produced annually in 7,000 cases of red wine and 350 cases of dry white wine. Additionally there are produced second wines Le Clémentin du Pape Clément and Le Prélat du Pape Clément. The introduction of a second wine in the 1980s, was widely credited with allowing the estate to increase their focus on the quality of their Grand vin, by being more selective in which grapes were used. Today the Grand vin is typically composed of two-thirds Cabernet Sauvignon with Merlot making up the remaining third. The wine is aged in oak barrels (almost half being new oak) for a minimum of fourteen months. The non-cru classé white wine will typically be composed of equal amounts of Sauvignon blanc and Sémillon, depending on the vintage.
