= Graves de Vayres =

Graves de Vayres is an Appellation d'Origine Contrôlée (AOC) for red and white wines in the Bordeaux wine region of France. It covers 700 hectares (1,700 acres) across the Vayres and Arveyres communes and is located within the Entre-Deux-Mers subregion of Bordeaux.

== History ==
Several sharpened pieces of flint dating back to the Paleolithic period have been found within the Graves de Vayres appellation. The wine region itself dates back to the Gallo-Roman age. Vayres is situated on the Dordogne, near the Voie impériale, a Roman road that runs from Bordeaux to Périgueux. The Emperor Octavius understood the strategic importance of this place, and based a garrison here under the command of Varius, who would leave the name Vayres (varatedo) to the village. From the mid-19th Century, red and white wines from the Graves de Vayres appellation were renowned, as Cocks and Féret mention in Bordeaux et ses vins ("Bordeaux and its wines"):

Without claiming to rival those of Médoc or Saint-Emilion, the red wines of Graves de Vayres are nevertheless full of delicacy. Its Premiers crus are highly sought after for their body and finesse, and can be classed among the best wines of the Libournais, directly after the Deuxièmes crus of Pomerol. Its whites still remain in favour with lovers of Northern-French varieties, and have gained a significant place in several foreign markets.

Numerous documents are still around today concerning a sufficient amount of winegrowers to form a collective use of the appellation "Graves de Vayres." It is mentioned in the price lists of Horeau Beylot et Cie (1890), Jacquet et Fils (1895) and Legendre et Cie (1898), as well as in price lists of Libournais traders. The name is also used in the inventory and trade records of numerous Bordeaux wine houses, and began appearing on printed labels in 1904. The exposition of a Monsieur Béchaud at the Bordeaux Wine Market in November 1909 again indicates the existence of the Graves de Vayres appellation. On 3 January 1962, the Winemakers' Union of Graves de Vayres was formed. It decided, by virtue of local, loyal and constant use, to include the gravelly soils of the Arveyres plateau, along with those of Vayres, in the appellation area of Graves de Vayres. This winemakers' union was among the first to appear in Gironde, and in 1966, it established the institution of quality control checking wine, which was done by taste and analysis. Quality remains a priority for wines made in the 600-odd hectares of this appellation area in the heart of Bordeaux. Pre-approval is arranged with winemakers, and a committee from the wine region tracks the cultivation of the vines.

== Soil ==
Around forty producers tend the gravelly soil found on the left bank of the Dordogne, on a geomorphic system of alluvial terraces. This terrace system is evidence that the Dordogne River sunk within the valley during the last Ice Age. Smallholdings, ranging from 0.67 hectares (1.7 acres) to around 60 hectares (150 acres) in area, only exist in the Vayres commune and the plateau of its neighbouring commune, Arveyres. The limits of this appellation area were defined in 1936, by the gravel, sandy-gravel, clay-gravel and silty-gravel soils found along the path of the Dordogne, because of their potential qualities.

== Wines ==
=== Red Graves de Vayres ===
The Red Graves de Vayres is ruby in colour. When the wine is young, due to the dominant Merlot, it is fresh and highly fruity.

=== White Graves de Vayres ===
Dry white Graves de Vayres wines are made from 100% Sauvignon grapes. These wines are fresh, lively, and perfumed with floral notes and hints of citrus fruit. Barrel-fermented wines made with 100% Sémillon grapes are characterised by their slick, buttery, and rich, rounded texture. The sweet moelleux variety of Graves de Vayres is made from 100% Sémillon grapes, which are harvested only when they are over-ripe. This gives sweet and honey notes, and a wine pale yellow in colour. The majority of dry white Graves de Vayres is in fact composed of a blend of 70% Sauvignon, 20-25% Sémillion, and 5-10% Muscadelle grapes.
