= Château de Camensac =

Winery in Bordeaux, France

Coordinates: 45.14660°N 0.78645°W

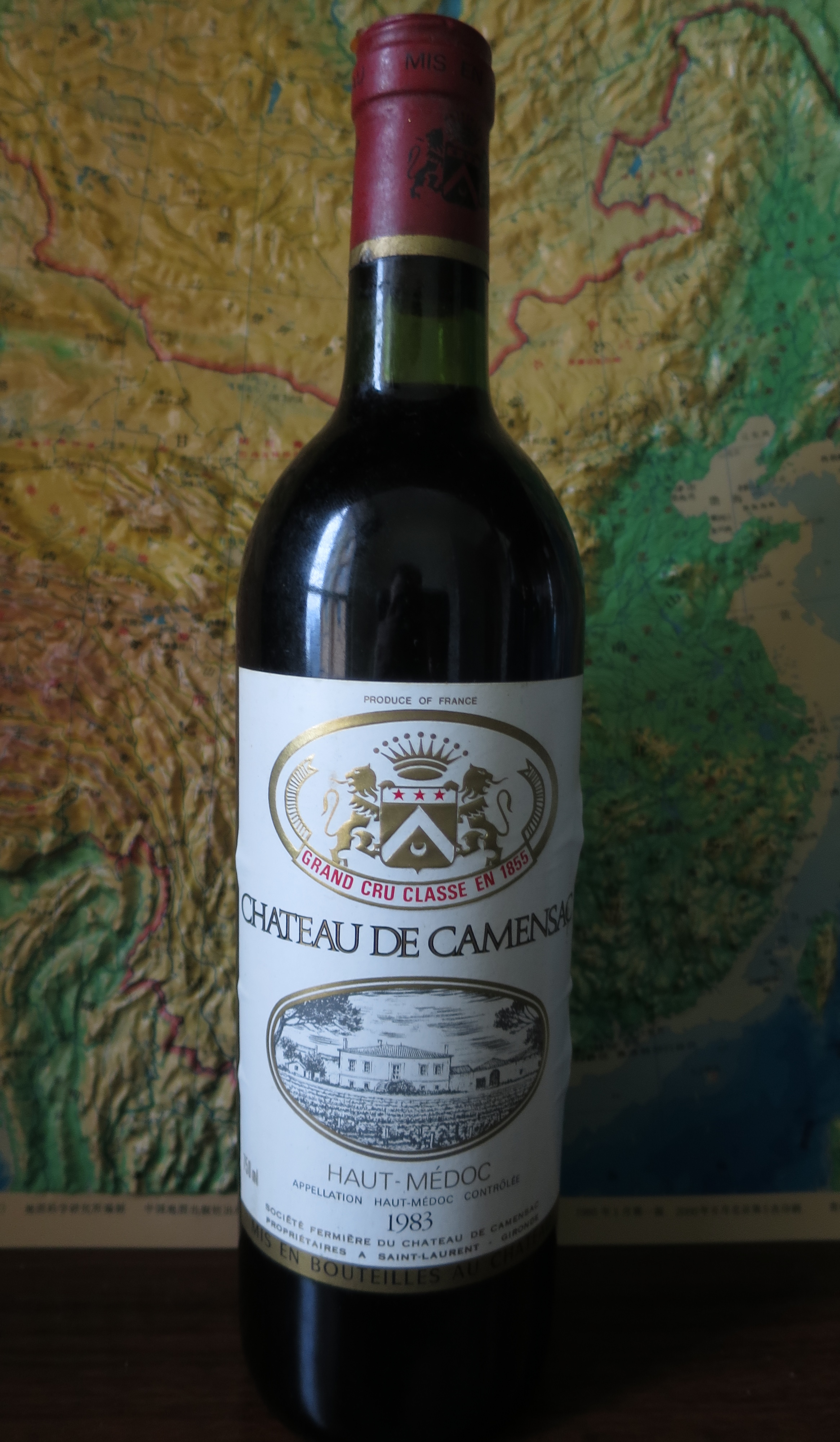
Château de Camensac 1983

Château de Camensac is a winery in the Haut-Médoc appellation of the Bordeaux region of France. Château de Camensac is also the name of the red wine produced by this property. The wine produced here was classified as one of eighteen Cinquièmes Crus (Fifth Growths) in the Bordeaux Wine Official Classification of 1855.

== Vineyard ==
The vineyards of Château Camensac are in the commune of Saint-Laurent-Médoc, just beyond the boundary of the Saint-Julien-Beychevelle appellation. As such it is entitled to only the Haut-Médoc appellation for its wines. The estate's 65 hectares of vines (60% Cabernet Sauvignon, 40% Merlot) are planted at a dense 10,000 vines per hectare and have an average age of 35 years. The estate limits yields to 45 hectoliters per hectare and grapes are picked and sorted by hand.

== The wine ==
As is common for wineries in the Médoc, Château Camensac produces two wines, its first label, Château Camensac, and a second label, La Closerie de Camensac, into which lesser quality lots are blended. After harvest, the wines undergo primary fermentation in stainless steel vats before being transferred to oak barrels for malolactic fermentation and 17–20 months of aging. In recent years, oenologist Michel Rolland has been a consultant.

== See also ==
- Bordeaux Wine
- French wine
