= Château La Lagune =

Coordinates: 44.9789°N 0.6188°W

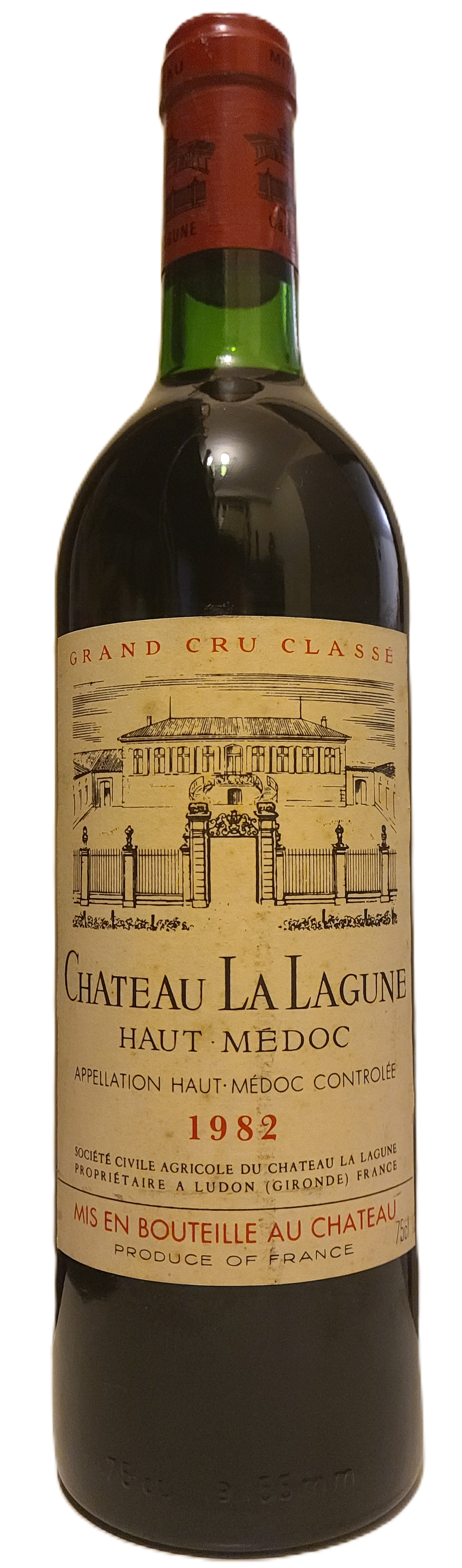
Grand Vin 1982

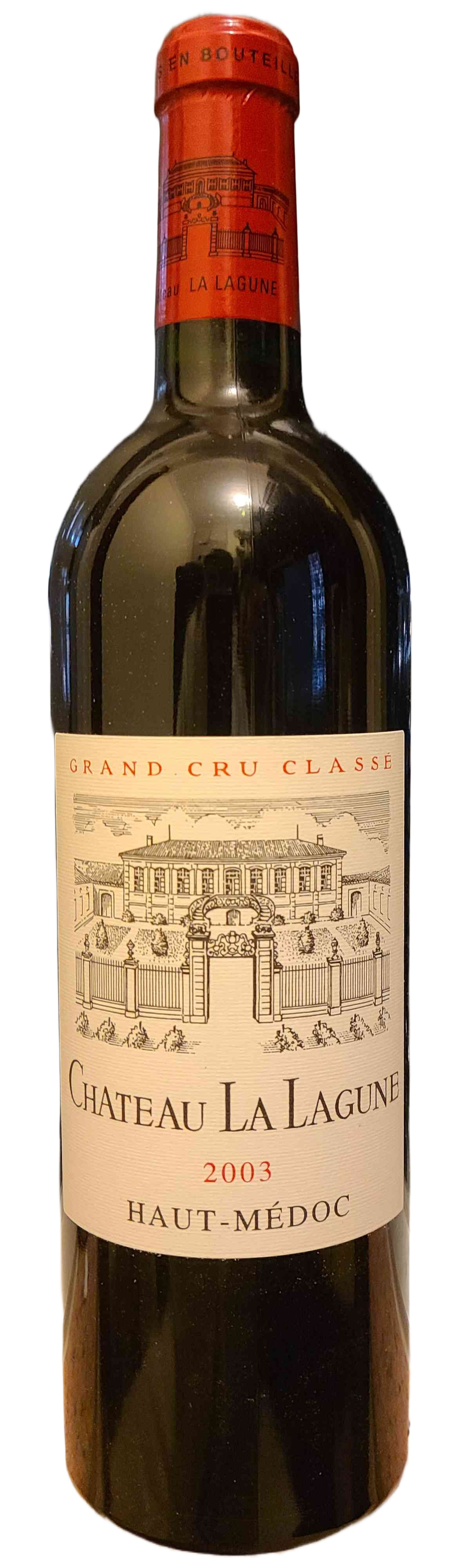
Grand Vin 2003

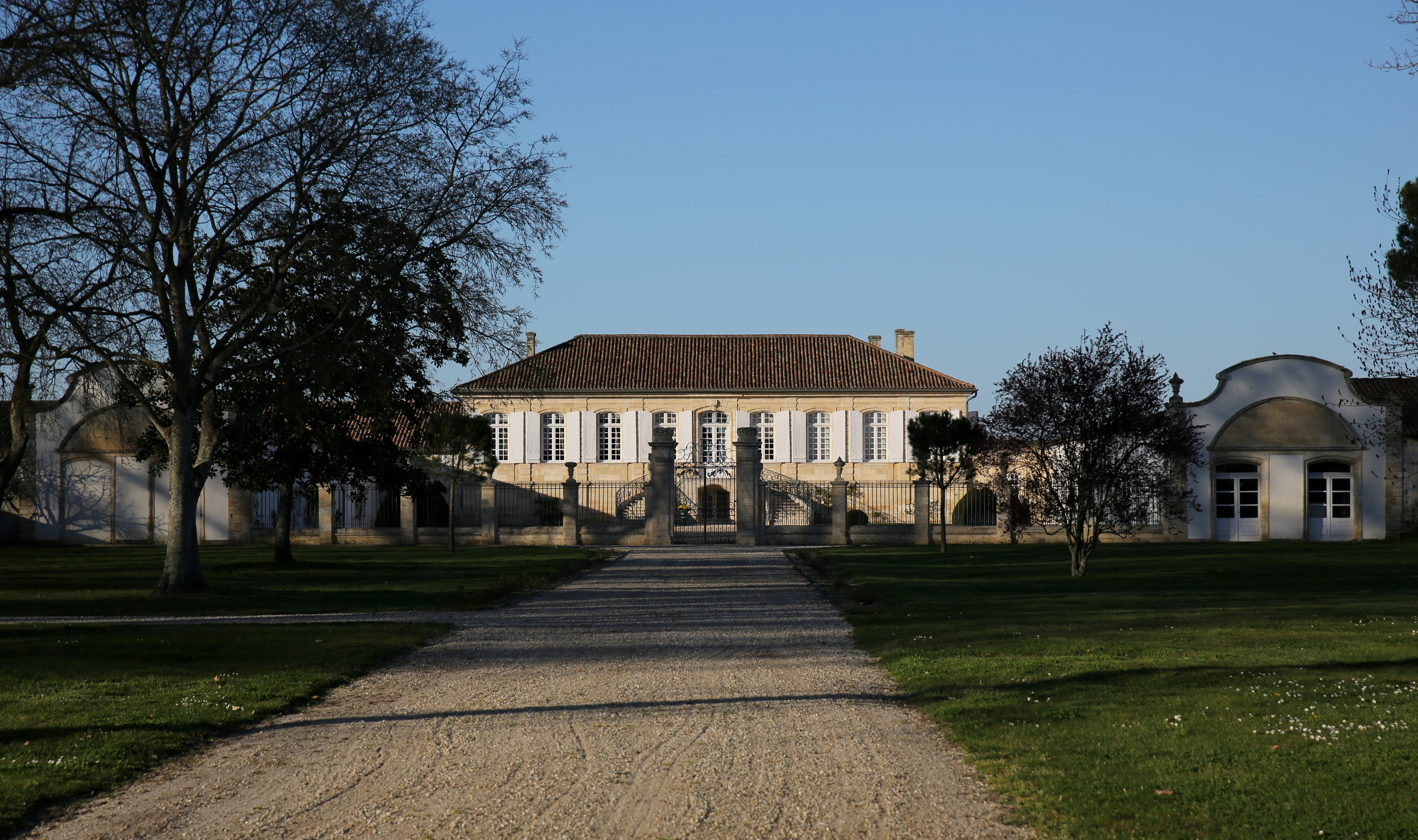

Château La Lagune is a winery in the Haut-Médoc appellation of the Bordeaux region of France. The wine produced here was classified as one of fourteen Troisièmes Crus (Third Growths) in the historic Bordeaux Wine Official Classification of 1855.

Rescued from dereliction in 1954 by Georges Brunet, La Lagune was subsequently sold to the Ducellier family of Champagne Ayala. In 2000, both La Lagune and Champagne Ayala were sold to the Frey family. Ayala was then sold to the House of Bollinger, and the Frey family acquired Maison Jaboulet in the Rhone. The Freys are also a substantial but not majority shareholders of Billecart-Salmon, the producer in Mareuil-sur-Aÿ.

Located in the commune of Ludon, La Lagune has 72 hectares (180 acres) under vine with a grape variety distribution of 60% Cabernet Sauvignon, 20% Merlot, 10% Cabernet Franc, and 10% Petit Verdot.
