= Château La Tour Carnet =

Bordeaux wine estate

Coordinates: 45.14674°N 0.79404°W

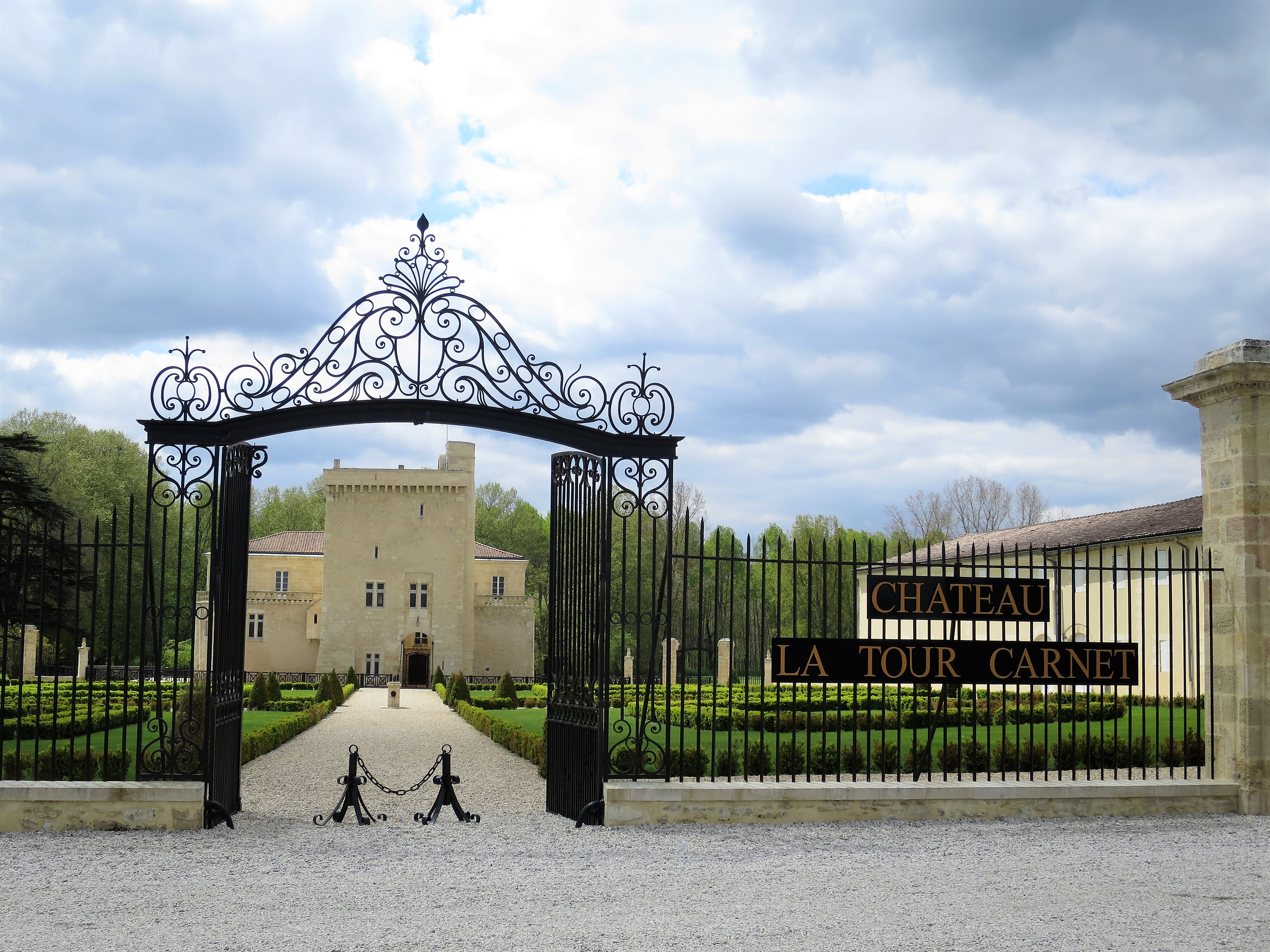
Entrance of the wine estate

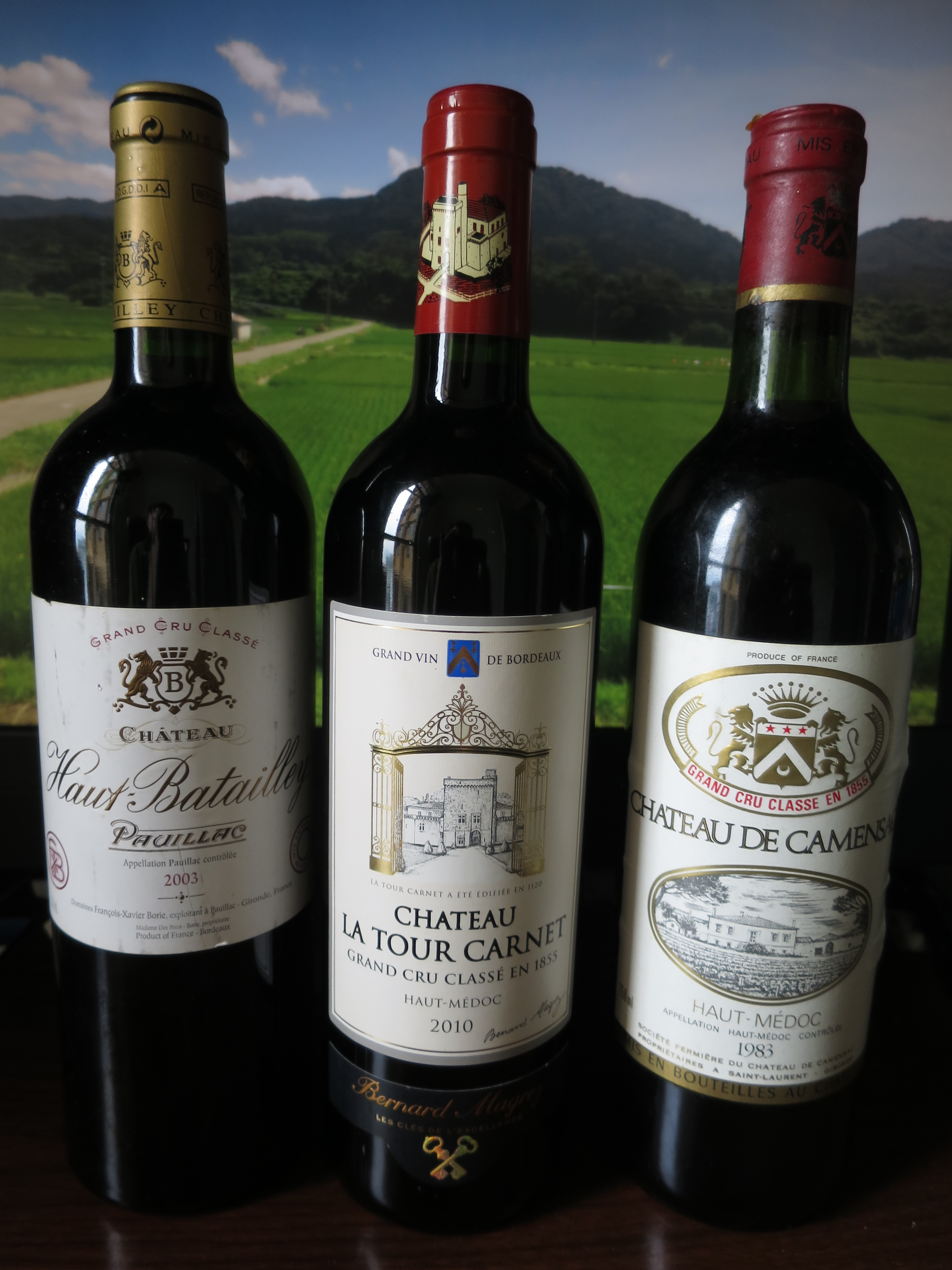
A bottle of Château La Tour Carnet 2010 in the center

Château La Tour Carnet is a Bordeaux wine estate in the appellation Haut-Médoc. The wine produced here was classified as one of ten Quatrièmes Crus (Fourth Growths) in the historic Bordeaux Wine Official Classification of 1855, at the time known by the name of Carnet.

== History ==
The estate has origins in the early Middle Ages, though the details are largely unknown, but takes its name from Jean Caranet or Carnet, an heir of Jean de Foix who is believed responsible for having built the château tower.

The estate has been owned by Bernard Magrez since 1999.

== Production ==
Château La Tour Carnet extends 126 hectares (310 acres), of which 73 ha (180 acres) are under vine, planted with 45% Cabernet Sauvignon, 50% Merlot, 3% Cabernet Franc and 2% Petit Verdot of red grape varieties, as well as white grape varieties of which there is a distribution of 45% Sauvignon blanc, 15% Sauvignon gris and 30% Sémillon.

There is typically produced 15,000 cases (1,300 hL) annually of the grand vin Château La Tour Carnet. A second wine is produced under the label Les Douves du Chateau La Tour Carnet, with an annual production of 9,000 cases (810 hL).
