= Saint-Laurent-Médoc =

- Commune
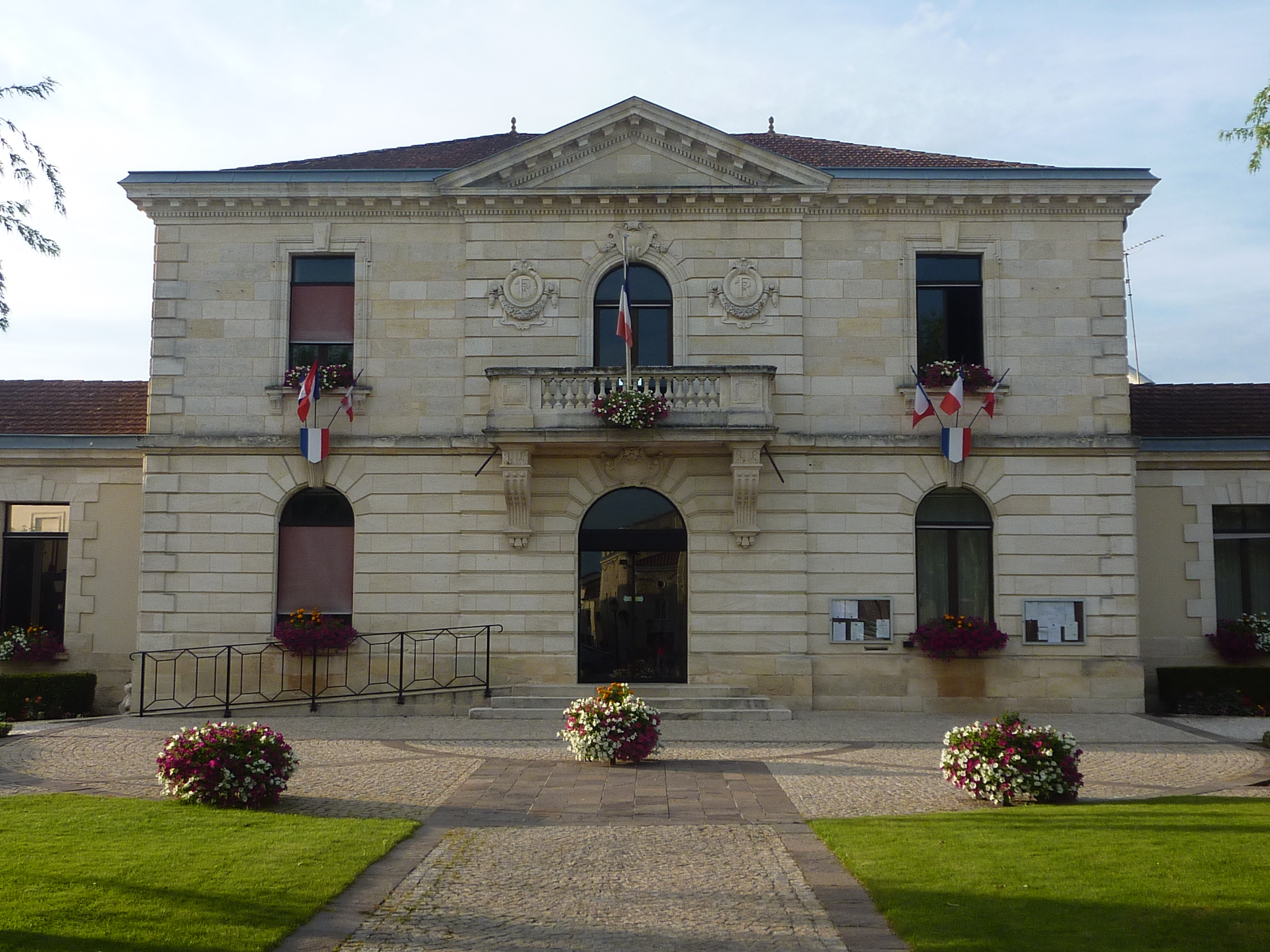
- The town hall in Saint-Laurent-Médoc

- Coat of arms
- Location of Saint-Laurent-Médoc
- Location within France Location within Nouvelle-Aquitaine
- Coordinates: 45°09′04″N 0°49′15″W
- Country: France
- Region: Nouvelle-Aquitaine
- Department: Gironde
- Arrondissement: Lesparre-Médoc
- Canton: Le Sud-Médoc

Government
  - Mayor (2020–2026): Jean-Marie Feron
- Area^{1}: 136.55 km^{2} (52.72 sq mi)
- Elevation: 9 m (30 ft)
- Highest elevation: 41 m (135 ft)
- Lowest elevation: 4 m (13 ft)
- Population (2023): 4,914
  - Density: 35.99/km^{2} (93.21/sq mi)
- Time zone: UTC+01:00 (CET)
  - Summer (DST): UTC+02:00 (CEST)
- INSEE/Postal code: 33424 /33112
- ^{1} French Land Register data, which excludes lakes, ponds, glaciers > 1 km^{2} (0.386 sq mi or 247 acres) and river estuaries.

Saint-Laurent-Médoc (French pronunciation: [sɛ̃ loʁɑ̃ medɔk], also known as Saint-Laurent-du-Médoc; Occitan: Sent Laurenç de Medòc) is a commune in the Gironde department in Nouvelle-Aquitaine in southwestern France.

== Population ==
Historical population
Year	Pop.	±% p.a.
1968	2,034	—
1975	2,063	+0.20%
1982	2,896	+4.96%
1990	3,338	+1.79%
1999	3,366	+0.09%
2007	3,774	+1.44%
2012	4,350	+2.88%
2017	4,673	+1.44%
2023	4,914	+0.84%
Source: INSEE

== See also ==
- Communes of the Gironde department
- Haut-Médoc AOC
