= Macau, Gironde =

Macau
- Commune
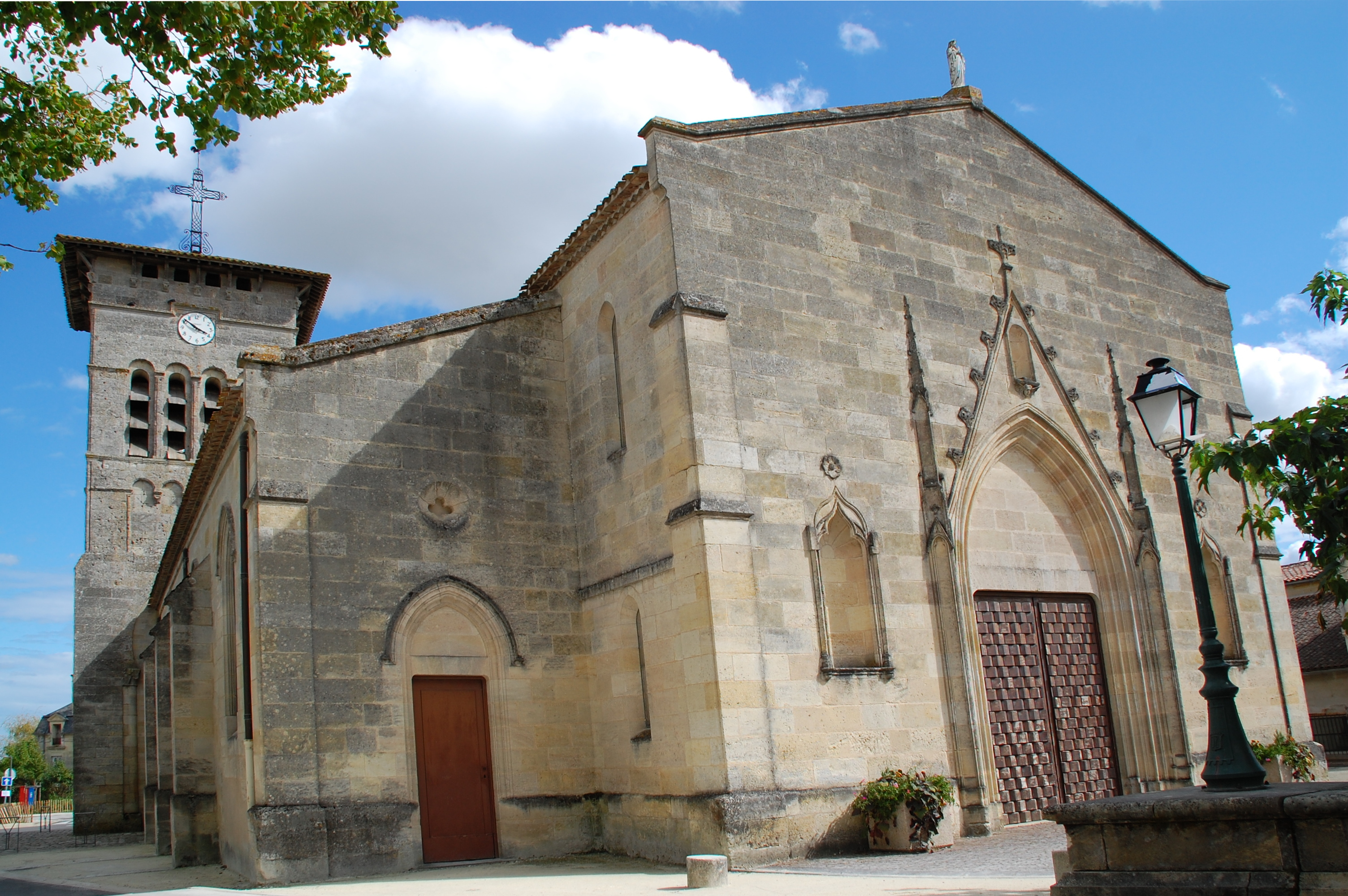
- The church in Macau

- Coat of arms
- Location of Macau
- Location within France Location within Nouvelle-Aquitaine
- Coordinates: 45°00′33″N 0°36′46″W
- Country: France
- Region: Nouvelle-Aquitaine
- Department: Gironde
- Arrondissement: Bordeaux
- Canton: Le Sud-Médoc
- Intercommunality: Médoc Estuaire

Government
  - Mayor (2020–2026): Chrystel Colmont-Digneau
- Area^{1}: 19.56 km^{2} (7.55 sq mi)
- Elevation: 9 m (30 ft)
- Highest elevation: 26 m (85 ft)
- Lowest elevation: 0 m (0 ft)
- Population (2023): 4,576
  - Density: 233.9/km^{2} (605.9/sq mi)
- Time zone: UTC+01:00 (CET)
  - Summer (DST): UTC+02:00 (CEST)
- INSEE/Postal code: 33262 /33460
- ^{1} French Land Register data, which excludes lakes, ponds, glaciers > 1 km^{2} (0.386 sq mi or 247 acres) and river estuaries.

Macau (French pronunciation: [mako]) is a commune in the Gironde department in Nouvelle-Aquitaine in southwestern France.

== Population ==
Historical population
Year	Pop.	±% p.a.
1968	2,017	—
1975	2,065	+0.34%
1982	2,349	+1.86%
1990	2,648	+1.51%
1999	2,890	+0.98%
2007	3,278	+1.59%
2012	3,668	+2.27%
2017	4,225	+2.87%
2023	4,576	+1.34%
Source: INSEE

== Heraldry ==
Arms of Macau	The arms of Macau are blazoned: "Per bend sinister first Azure a nave sails and rigging Argent sailing on a river of three wavy dashes Sable, second Sable the church of the place Argent windows of the field; the division debruised by a bend sinister Or charged in fess point with an artichoke Vert between, in chief and base, two bunches of grape Gules stick and tendril Sable, all set straight."

== See also ==
- Communes of the Gironde department
