= Saint-Julien AOC =

Red wine from Bordeaux, France

Saint-Julien
- Wine region
- Type: Appellation d'origine contrôlée
- Year established: 1936
- Country: France
- Part of: Bordeaux Left Bank
- Climate region: Oceanic climate
- Size of planted vineyards: 920 ha (2,300 acres)
- Grapes produced: Cabernet Franc, Cabernet Sauvignon, Carménère, Merlot, Malbec, and Petit Verdot
- Wine produced: 41,758 hL (1,103,100 US gal)

AOC Saint-Julien appears in light green on the map in the region of Medoc.

Saint-Julien (French pronunciation: [sɛ̃ ʒyljɛ̃]) is an Appellation d'Origine Contrôlée (AOC) for red wine in the Bordeaux region, located in the Médoc subregion. It takes its name from the commune Saint-Julien-Beychevelle and is one of the six communal appellations in Médoc. A number of classified (Grand Cru Classé) Bordeaux estates are located within the appellation.

== History ==
The tradition of wine-growing in Saint-Julien-Beychevelle and the way in which its terroir has come to prominence parallels the history of the Médoc wines in general.

== Appellation ==
=== Area of designated origin ===
Saint-Julien wines are mainly produced in the commune of Saint-Julien-Beychevelle, but a few plots can be found elsewhere in Cussac-Fort-Médoc and Saint-Laurent-Médoc.

Saint-Julien-Beychevelle is located between the Margaux and Pauillac appellations, on the left bank of the Gironde estuary.

=== Geology and orography ===
The vineyards lie on a bed of sedimentary rock. Unlike the surface soil, which is an unbroken expanse of pebbles, the subsoil is surprisingly complex and is the reason why Saint-Julien wines vary so much in character.

== The vineyards ==
=== Grape varieties ===
The grape varieties grown under this appellation are the same as those found throughout the Médoc area, i.e. predominantly Cabernet Sauvignon, along with Cabernet Franc, Merlot, Malbec, Petit Verdot and Carménère (traces only).

The maximum permitted yield per hectare is 45 hectolitres, wherever the density of planting is between 6,500 and 10,000 vines per hectare. This appellation is traditionally divided into two areas, although this is a matter of some controversy. The southern wines, which are smoother and more feminine, are closely related to the Margaux wines, while the northern wines, which are more robust and powerful (the Léoville wines, for example, bordering the vineyards of Latour), have more in common with the wines of Pauillac.

== Estates ==
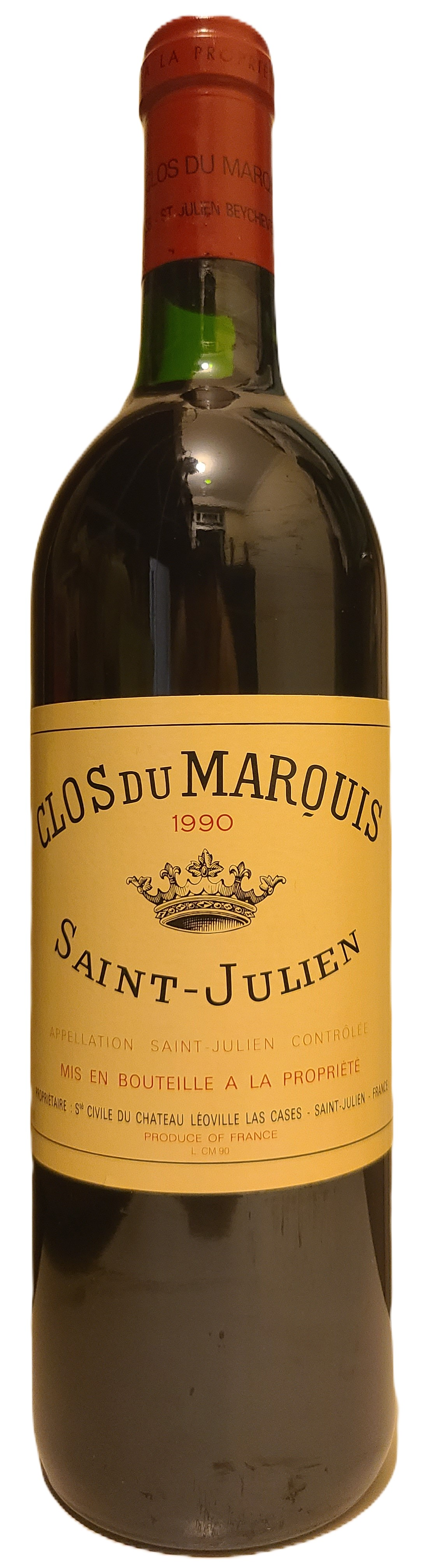
Clos du Marquis 1990

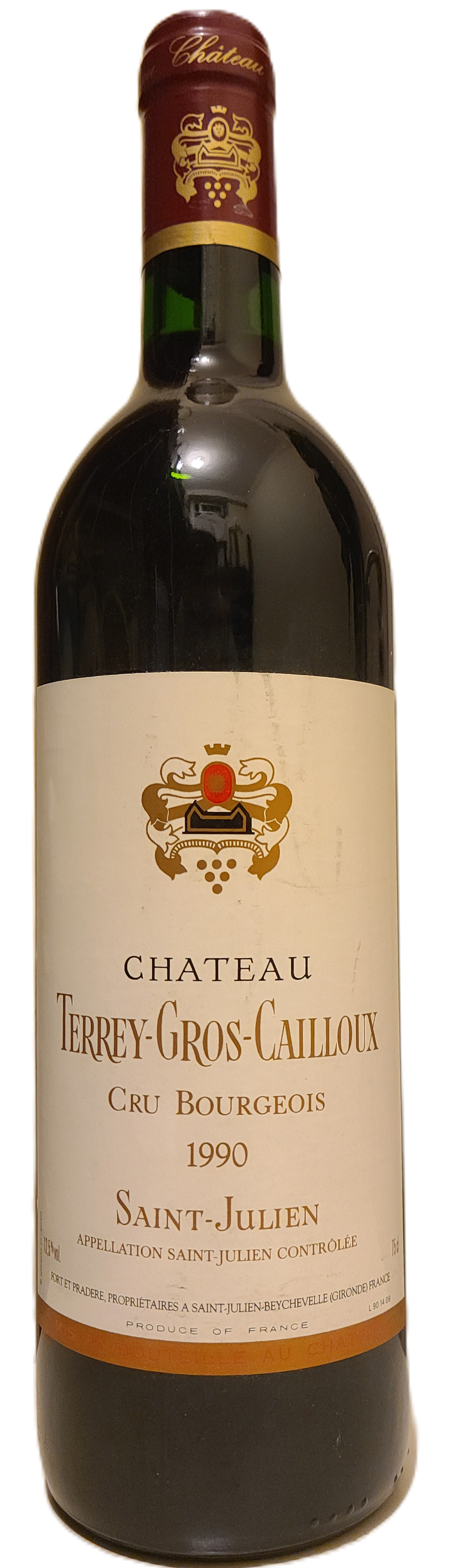
Chateau Terrey Gros Cailloux 1990

In the Bordeaux Wine Official Classification of 1855, there are no First Growths in Saint-Julien, but several rated Second Growths.

Seconds crus
Château Ducru-Beaucaillou	Château Gruaud-Larose	Château Léoville-Barton
Château Léoville-Las Cases	Château Léoville-Poyferré	
Troisièmes crus
Château Lagrange	Château Langoa-Barton	
Quatrièmes crus
Château Beychevelle	Château Branaire-Ducru	Château Saint-Pierre
Château Talbot
Unclassified
Château Gloria	Château La Bridane	Chateau du Glana

== See also ==
- Médoc AOC
- Bordeaux wine
