= Jean-Louis Triaud =

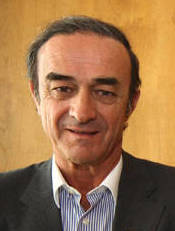
- Triaud in 2012
- Born: 22 November 1949 (age 76); Bordeaux, France
- Occupation: President Girondins de Bordeaux (1996-present)

Jean-Louis Triaud (born 22 November 1949 in Bordeaux, France) is the ex president of FC Girondins de Bordeaux. He was first elected in 1996, and upon completion of the term, reelected in 2002.

The son-in-law of the late Henri Martin, winemaker and mayor of Saint Julien, he is also the current proprietor of the chateaux Gloria and Saint-Pierre.
