= Château Gloria =

Coordinates: 45.14827°N 0.74185°W

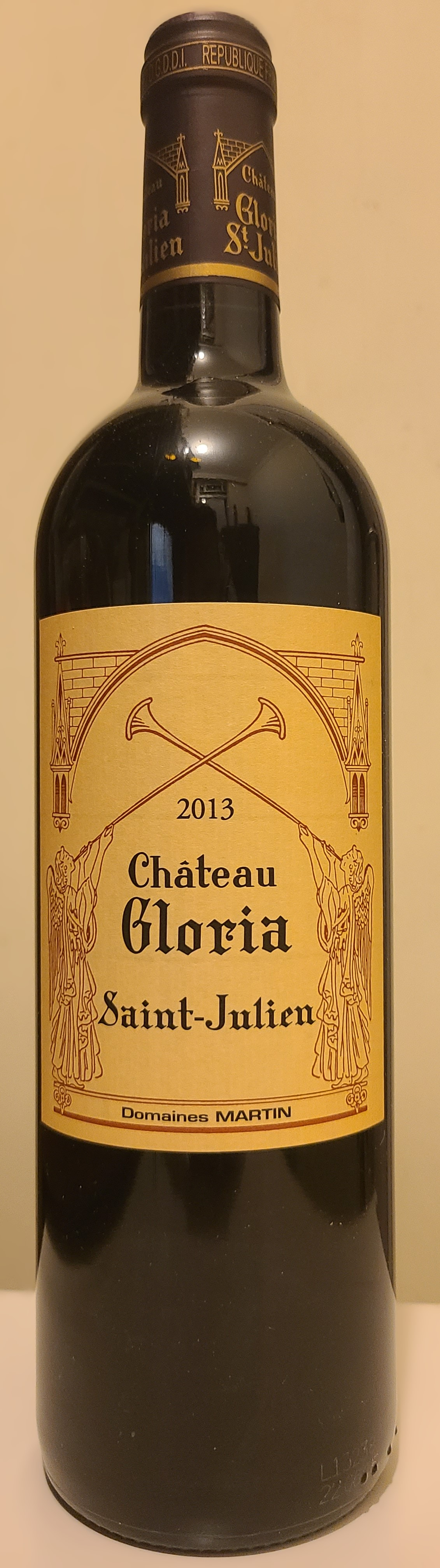
Grand Vin 2013

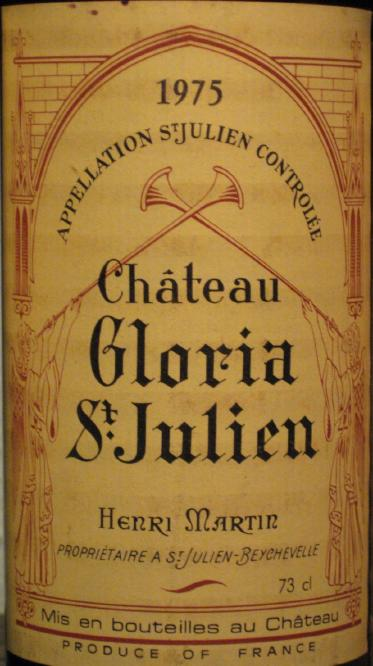
Detail of a Château Gloria 1975 label

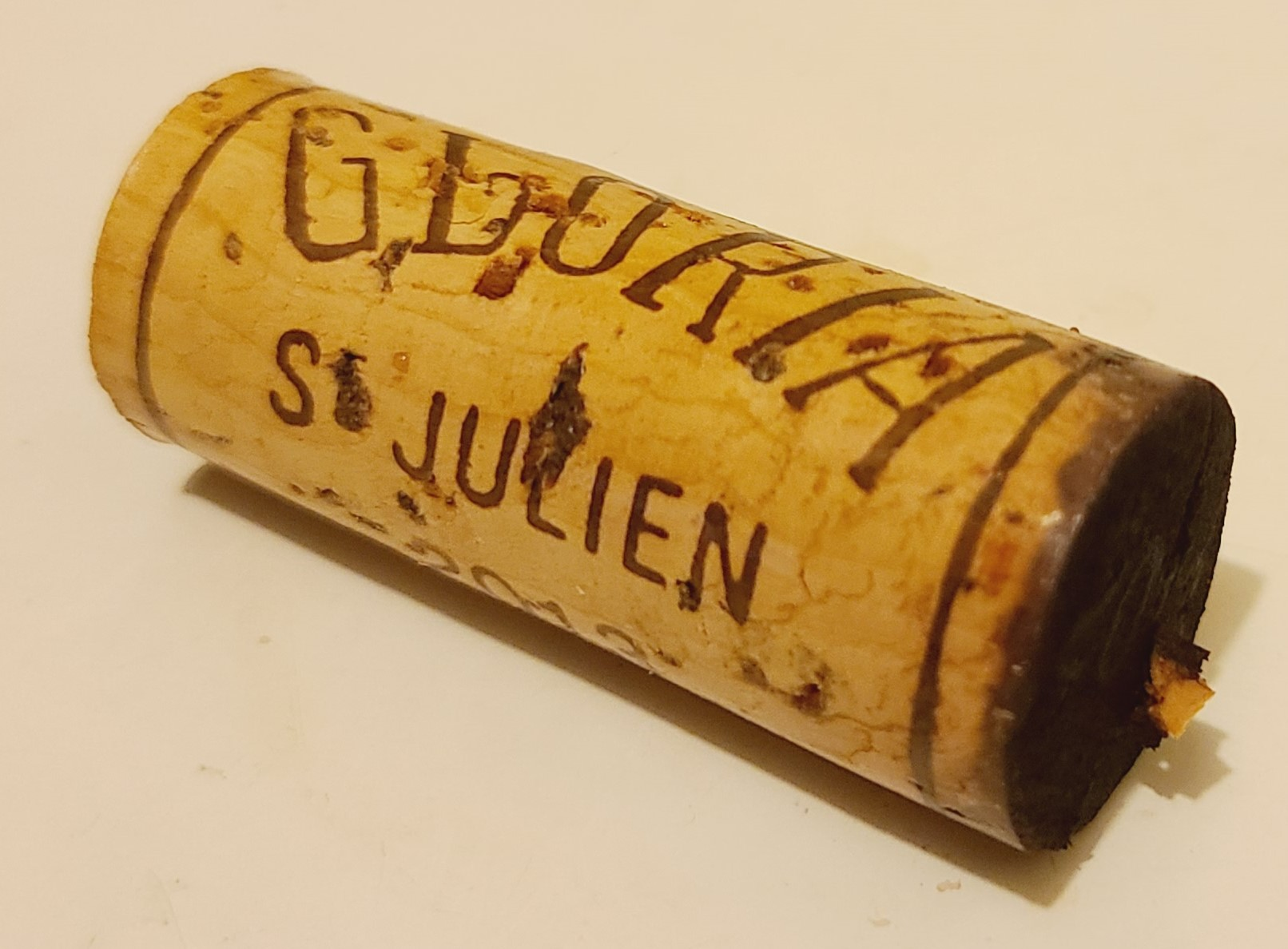
Cork

Château Gloria is a Bordeaux wine from the Saint-Julien appellation. The winery is located in the central part of France’s Bordeaux wine region Haut-Médoc, in the commune of Saint-Julien-Beychevelle.

Regarded as a well-made wine with the best characteristics of Saint-Julien, it is estimated by many to be on a par with the classed growths.

The château also produces a second wine from its younger vines named Château Peymartin.

== History ==
A relatively young estate, Château Gloria was founded and assembled by Monsieur Henri Martin who established the reputation of Gloria within the space of a generation. With the first acquisitions of 6 hectares (15 acres) of vines in 1942, and purchase of the chai of Château Saint-Pierre, Martin added to the estate over the years with land bought from the surrounding classed estates, including châteaux Saint-Pierre, Beychevelle, Léoville-Poyferré, Gruaud-Larose, Léoville-Barton, Ducru-Beaucaillou, Lagrange and a Saint-Julien property of Duhart-Milon, making up its present size.

The estate was included in the proposal by INAO to revise the 1855 classification, and subsequently became listed in the private classification of Alexis Lichine.

The current proprietor of the estate is Martin's son-in-law, Jean-Louis Triaud.

== Production ==
The vineyard area extends 48 hectares (120 acres), with the grape variety distribution of 65% Cabernet Sauvignon, 25% Merlot, 5% Cabernet Franc and 5% Petit verdot.

An average of 20,000 cases of the Grand vin are produced annually. Of the second wine Chateau Peymartin there are produced approximately 4,000 cases.
