= André Lurton =

French winemaker and winery owner (1924–2019)

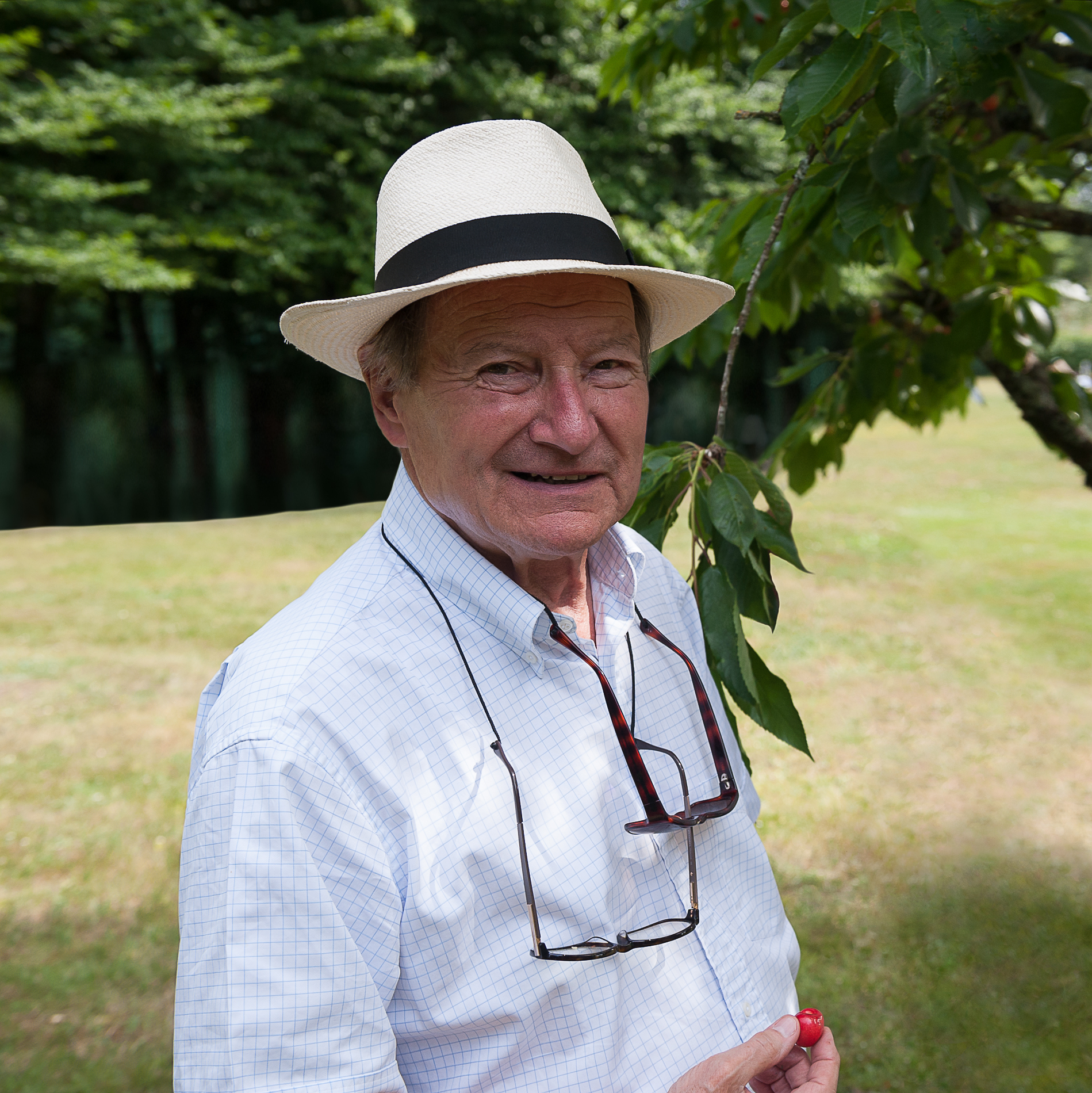
André Lurton at Château Bonnet -July 2011

André Lurton (4 October 1924 – 16 May 2019) was a French winemaker and winery owner. It is also the name of his eponymous winemaking group in Bordeaux which was mostly owned by him and after his death only by his children.

Lurton originates from the village of Grézillac in the Gironde department. From the late 1940s, he took an active role in many farming and winemaking organisations, including efforts to relaunch the Syndicat Viticole de l'Entre-Deux-Mers from 1953, and the vice presidency of Syndicat Viticole des Bordeaux et Bordeaux Supérieur from 1965 to 1996. From 1966 to 1986 he was director of Le Conseil Interprofessionnel du Vin de Bordeaux (CIVB). As president of Syndicat Viticole des Hautes Graves et Bordeaux from 1974 to 1980, of Syndicat Viticole de Pessac et Léognan from 1980 to 1987, and of Syndicat Viticole de Pessac-Léognan from 1987, he was instrumental in creating Pessac-Léognan as a separate appellation to cover the high-end subregion of Graves.

== Wines ==
The range of wines produced by André Lurton.

Vignobles André Lurton, the André Lurton group of Bordeaux wine estates, covers a total of 630 hectares (1,600 acres), of which 264 hectares (650 acres) in Pessac-Légonan, and their combined annual production is 4 million bottles. In 2012, Credit Agricole Grands Crus, the vineyard-owning subsidiary of the Credit Agricole bank, bought 18% of Vignobles André Lurton, with the other 82% remaining with André Lurton and his children.

Some of the châteaux fully owned by the group include:

- Château Bonnet is located in Lurton's home village of Grézillac in the north of the Entre-Deux-Mers appellation. It has been under Lurton's control since 1956.
- Château Couhins-Lurton, a Grand Cru Classé in Péssac-Léognan. The vineyards has been owned by Lurton since 1972, and the château and buildings since 1992.
- Château de Cruzeau in Péssac-Léognan, owned by Lurton since 1973.
- Château La Louvière in Péssac-Léognan, owned by Lurton since 1965.
- Château de Rochemorin in Péssac-Léognan, owned by Lurton since 1973.

Other châteaux managed by the group include:

- Château de Barbe Blanche in Lussac Saint-Emilion, 50% ownership by Lurton since 2000
- Château Dauzac in Margaux, owned by insurance company MAIF since 1988, and managed by Lurton since 1992
