= Jean-Paul Jauffret =

French businessman, politician and tennis player (1930–2026)

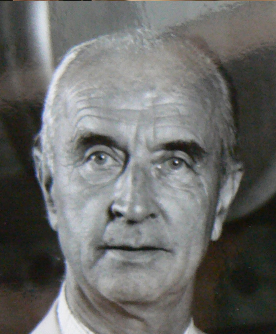
- Born: 22 August 1930; Bordeaux, France
- Died: 27 June 2026 (aged 95); Bordeaux, France
- Other name: JPJ
- Occupations: Vintner; Deputy mayor of Bordeaux
- Known for: Tennis player Businessman; President of CIVB
- Relatives: François Jauffret (brother); Loïc Courteau (nephew)
- Awards: Légion d'honneur National Order of Merit

Jean-Paul Jauffret (22 August 1930 – 27 June 2026) was a French oenologist, business manager, politician, and tennis player, the eldest child of a famous French tennis family

Jauffret was a veteran team world champion on several occasions, French university champion in 1951, and French cadet champion in 1946.

One of the key figures of Bordeaux wine of the second half of the 20th century, he devoted a large part of his life to the wine sector. In particular, he managed the CVBG-Dourthe-Kressmann trading house and created the Vinexpo. trade fair in 1981. He was elected president of the Bordeaux Interprofessional Wine Council and a permanent member of the Bordeaux Wine Academy.

He helped the bring French Prime Minister Alain Juppé to the city as the mayor of Bordeaux and in 1995 became his deputy for Finance, with a legacy of reducing the city's debt, and played an important role in the transformations of the city (tramway, pedestrianization of the city center, rehabilitation of the quays, opening of the city on its right bank). He also brought the world of wine closer to the city by relaunching the wine festival in 1998, which had previously ceased operations in 1909.

== Professional career ==
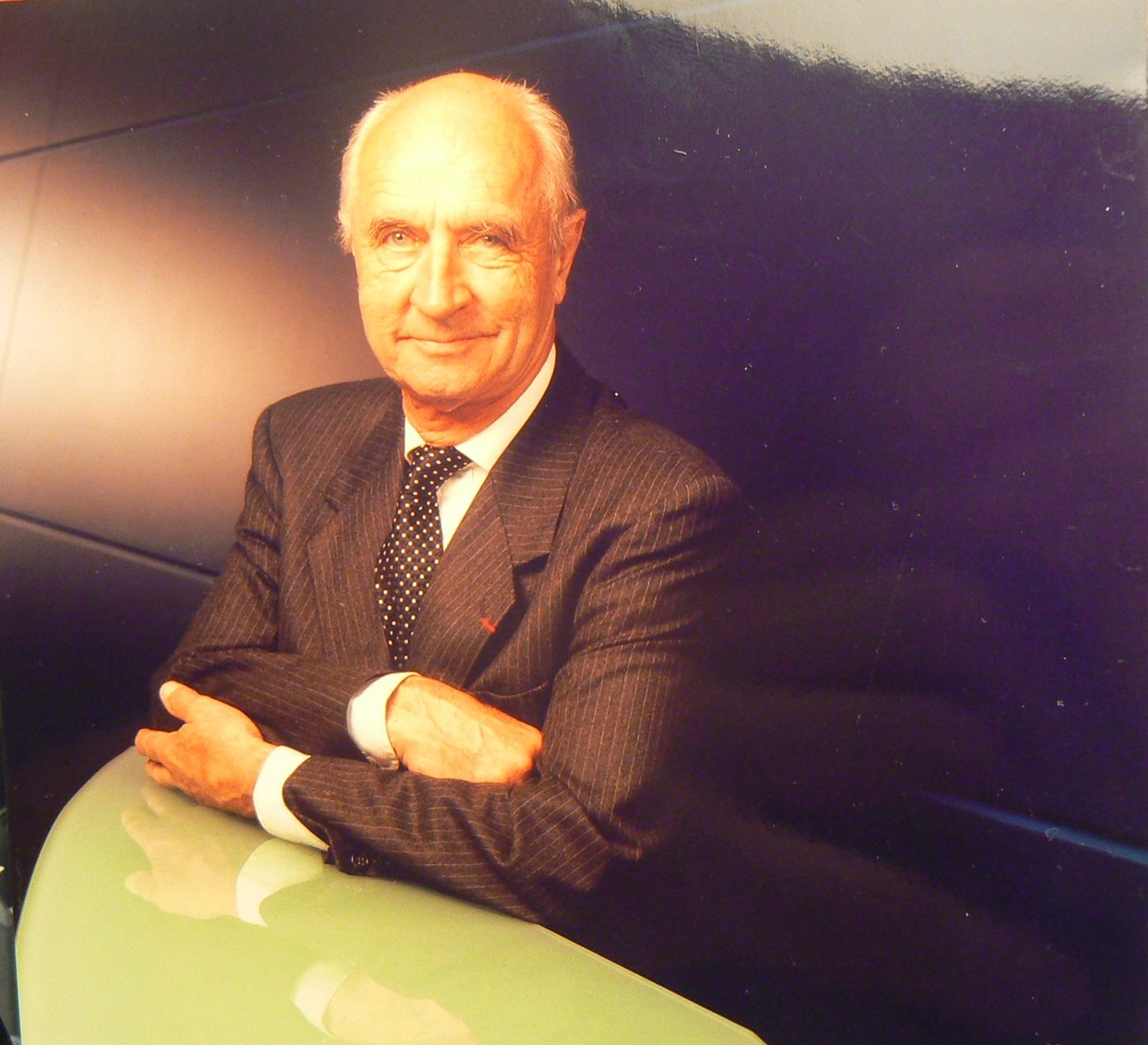
Jean-Paul Jauffret at Dourthe headquarters, Parempuyre (1988)

=== Dourthe ===
Jauffret began his career in 1952 at Château Maucaillou after a law degree taken at the University of Bordeaux, then managed the Dourthe Frères trading house, which he developed and which later became CVBG-Dourthe-Kressmann.

In 1988, he launched Dourthe number 1 with oenologist Denis Dubourdieu. Initially a research project, aiming to create a quality white wine at an affordable price by selecting plots throughout Bordeaux's vineyard environs and aging the wine in oak barrels, in the manner of great châteaux wines. This vintage, subsequently named “Dourthe no 1” and available in red and rosé. Two million bottles are produced each year, half of which are sold abroad, where it is marketed in 56 countries.

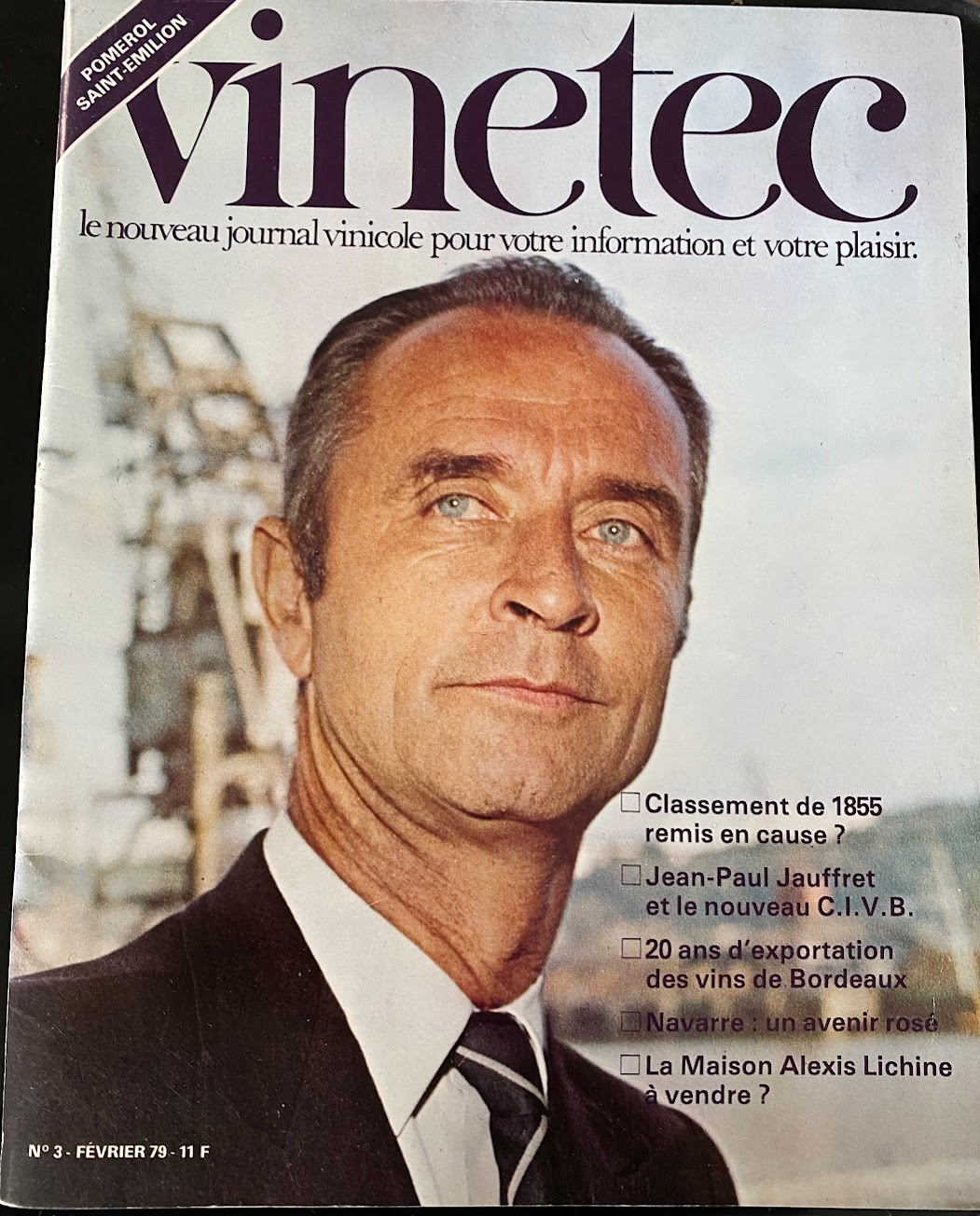
Cover Vinetech February 1979

=== Wine merchant union and CIVB ===
In 1970, he was elected president of the wine merchants' union. During the wine crisis, when he was president of the merchants, but also particularly appreciated by winegrowers for his successive positions in favor of a "decent" price for Bordeaux wine, he was elected President of the Bordeaux Interprofessional Wine Council in 1972, where he was at the origin of important reforms on quality, communication with the general public, and the protection of winegrowers in difficulty. It has therefore set up a bonus system for sellers not exceeding the optimum prices set by the CIVB. He also negotiated a lighter regime for wine within the framework of the Évin law. Following his mandate, he was named honorary president of the institution.

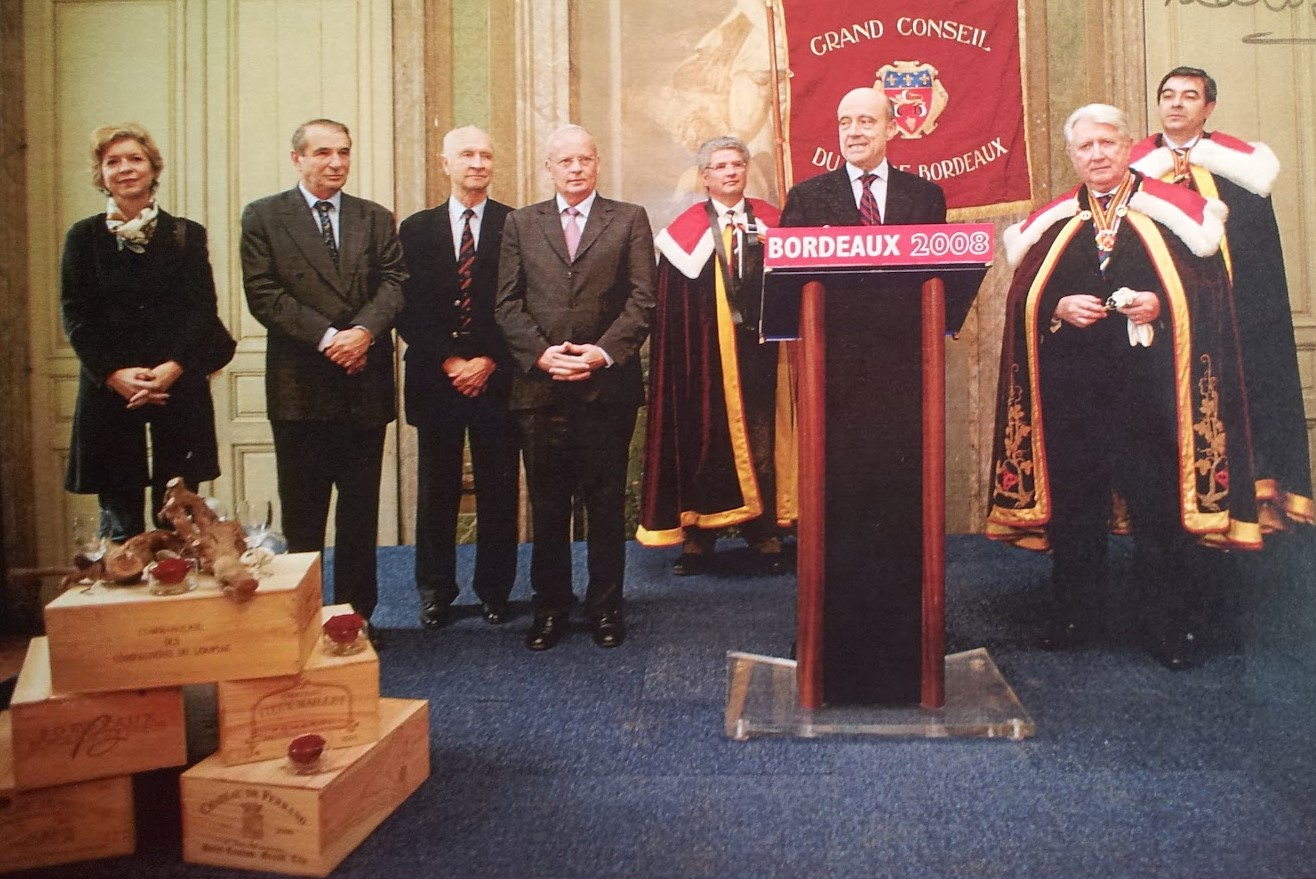
Jean-Paul Jauffret (third from the left) and Prime Minister Alain Juppé (foreground) at the Grand Conseil du Vin de Bordeaux in 2008

=== Vinexpo Bordeaux ===
In 1981 he created Vinexpo, which he wanted to create as a world wine fair, not limited to Bordeaux wine, against the advice of part of the profession which took a dim view of the presence of French and foreign competitors. Vinexpo has since established itself as the world wine fair, and takes place each year alternating in Bordeaux, New York City, and Hong Kong. The event attracts more than 45,000 visitors, 2,500 exhibitors (half of whom are foreigners) as well as hundreds of journalists, sommeliers, and starred chefs. Jauffret remained president of Vinexpo until 1996 before handing the position over to Claude Taittinger, CEO of Taittinger champagne. He was then elected honorary president of the show.

=== Cité du vin ===
Jauffret reiterated his ambition to make Bordeaux the world capital of wine during the creation of the Cité du Vin, for which he helped to raise the funds. This museum of wine civilizations was inaugurated on May 31, 2016, in the presence of Alain Juppé and François Hollande in an emblematic building in the shape of a vine designed by architects Anouk Legendre and Nicolas Desmazières and by the British scenography agency Casson Mann.

=== Bordeaux Wine Academy ===
Jauffret was a permanent member of the Bordeaux Wine Academy from 1990 on.

=== Other functions ===
Jauffret was vice-president of the supervisory board of Château Ducru-Beaucaillou from 1999 to 2020.

A graduate in oenology from the Faculty of Bordeaux in his first class in 1965, he was president of its alumni association.

== Sports career ==
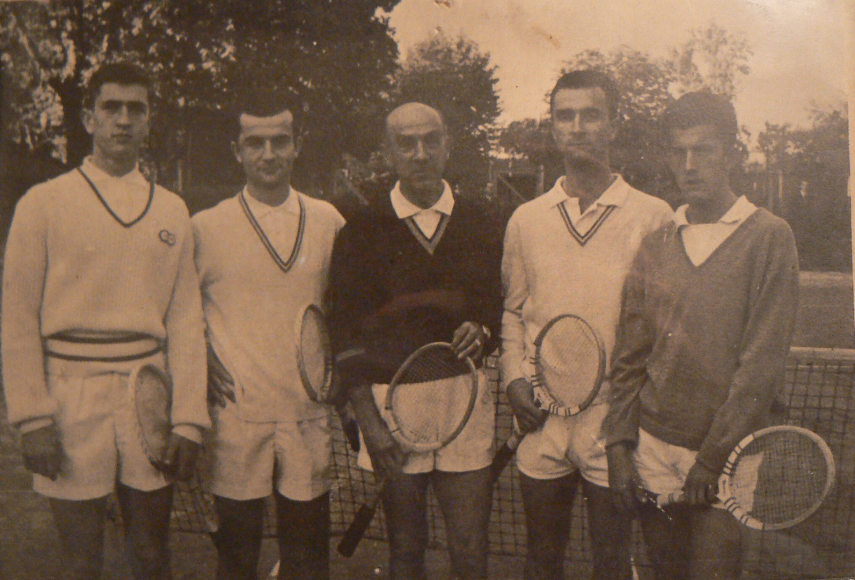
Jauffret brothers at the Villa Primrose Tennis club in Bordeaux, with from left to right: François, Pierre, their father André, Jean-Paul and Marc, 1963.

=== Villa Primrose Tennis Club ===
Coming from a prominent French tennis family, he was introduced to tennis at an early age by his father André Jauffret at the Villa Primrose club alongside his brothers, including François who would become a professional tennis player and French number one male tennis player for multiple years.

Jauffret was a member of the board of Villa Primrose since 1987, and honorary president since 1995.

=== Titles ===
Jauffret was the French junior champion in 1946 and a university champion in 1951. He made it to the second round of the French Open in 1953.

He was a multiple-time French champion and regularly won the world veteran team championship title during the 1990s.

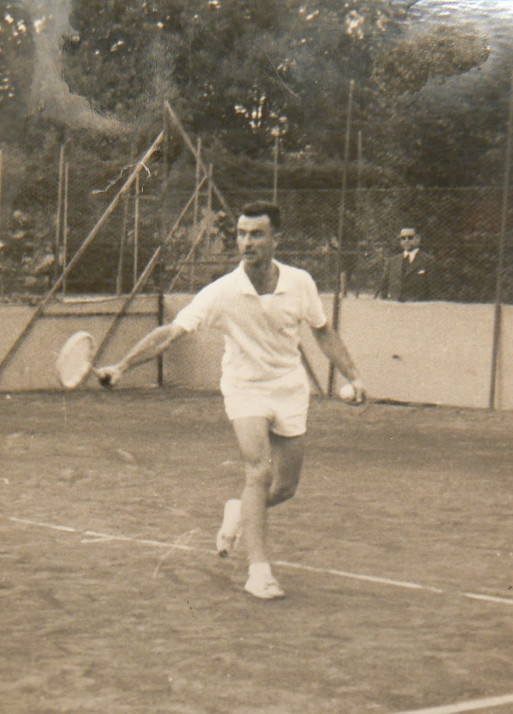
Jean-Paul Jauffret in 1949 at the Arcachon tennis tournament

=== French Tennis Federation ===
Elected as vice-president and then president of the Aquitaine tennis league in 1997,. He was also a member of the Federal Arbitration Commission of the French Tennis Federation since 2012.

Jauffret was also the president of the board of directors of Bordeaux's Creps.

== Political, civil and diplomatic engagement ==
=== Bordeaux Deputy Mayor ===
As the end of Jacques Chaban-Delmas' final term as mayor approached, Jean-Paul Jauffret worked to bring Alain Juppé, then Prime Minister of France, to the mayorship of Bordeaux.

Appointed in 1995 as deputy for finance, he helped the city recover its finances and reduce its debt, and connected the world of wine to the city by relaunching the wine festival, which had been abandoned since 1909. He remained deputy for finance until 2012, contributing to the transformation of Bordeaux with the introduction of the tramway, pedestrianization of the center, rehabilitation of the docks, and opening of the city to its right bank, notably with the construction of the Jacques-Chaban-Delmas bridge and the initial steps of the Simone Veil Bridge.

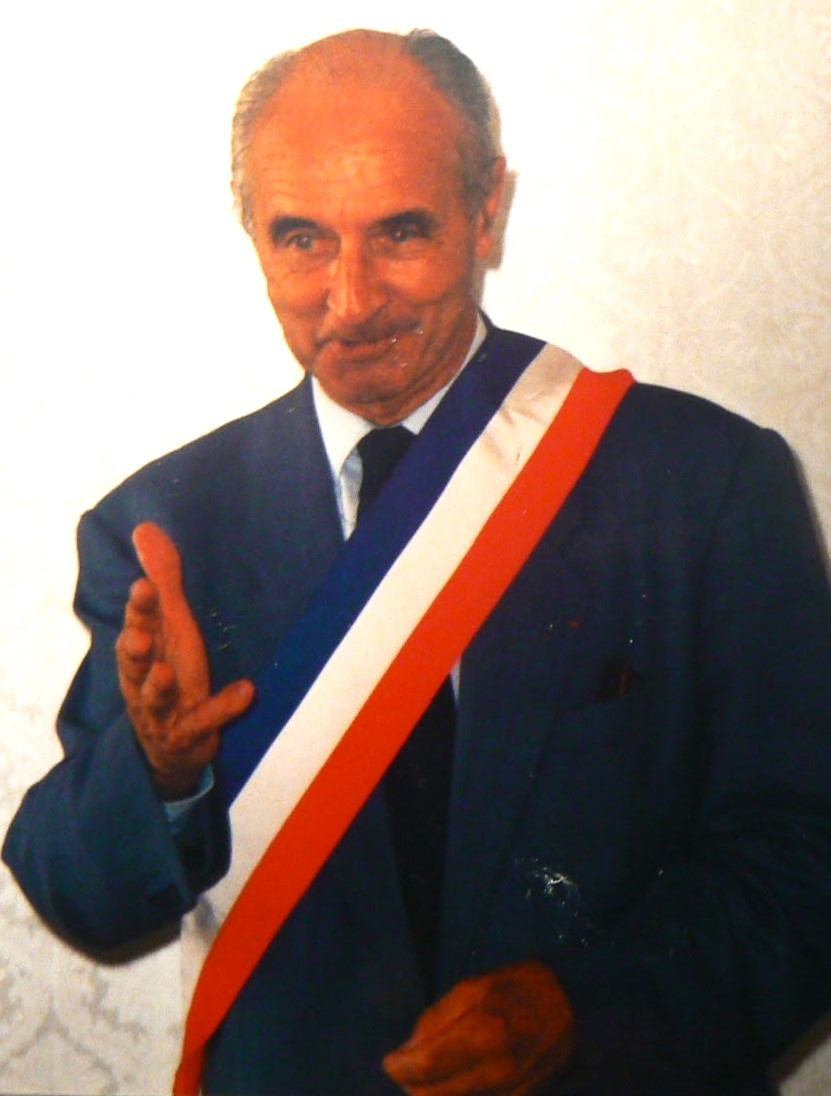
Jean-Paul Jauffret celebrating a wedding at the Bordeaux City Hall in 2001

Unusually, during the 2006 elections for the mayor and his deputies, he won not only the votes of his majority but also a vote from the opposing PS-PC party, thus obtaining more votes than Mayor Alain Juppé.

=== Public establishments ===
Jauffret was a director of the Bordeaux National Opera and president of the mixed economy company Gaz de Bordeaux. He was also vice-president of Bordeaux municipal credit.

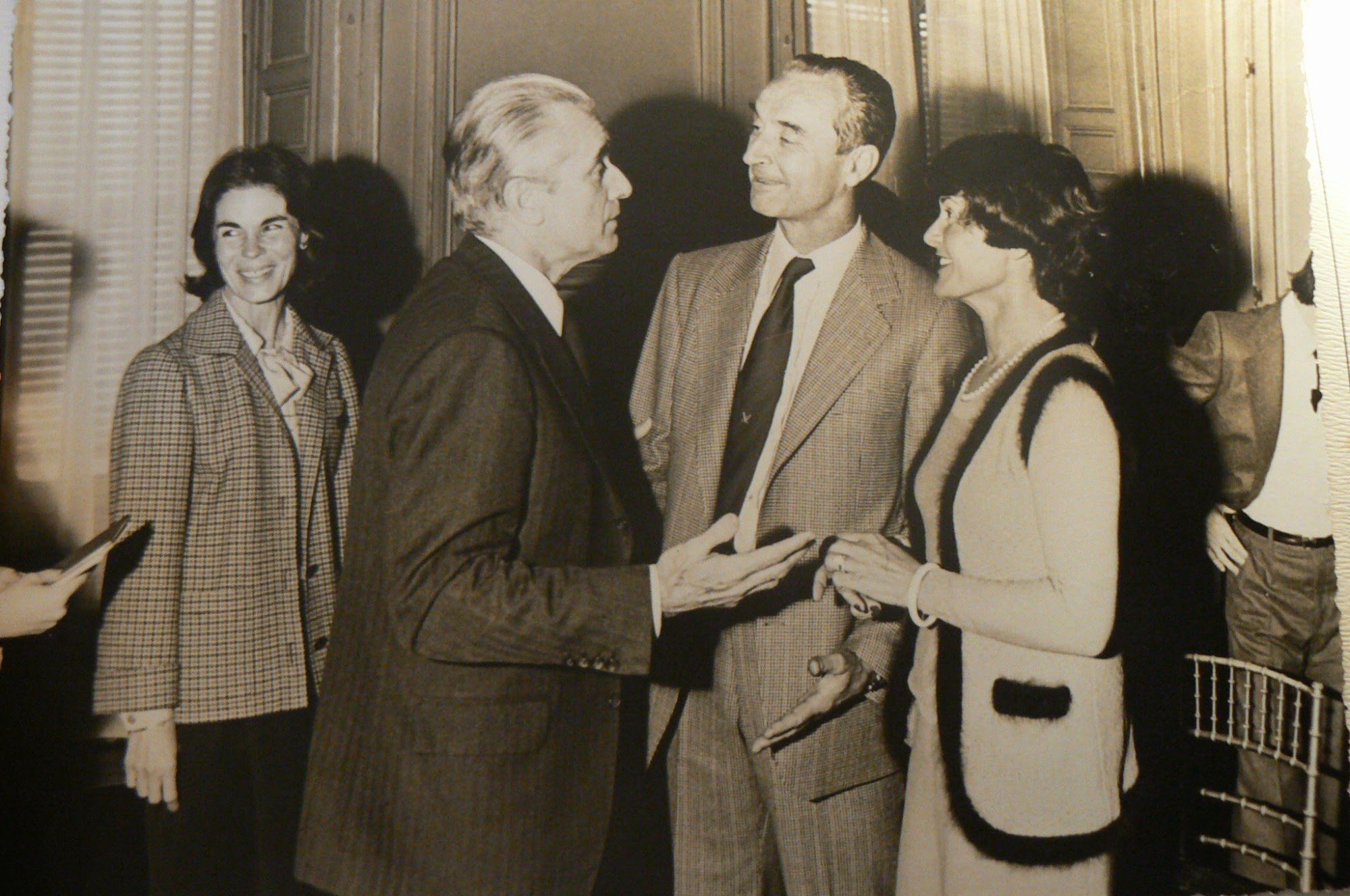
Jean-Paul Jauffret and Prime Minister Jacques Chaban-Delmas at the Bordeaux City Hall in 1978

=== Other mandates ===
Jauffret was also a judge at the Bordeaux commercial court and honorary consul of the Republic of Hungary in Bordeaux from 1990 to 2012 and treasurer of the Gironde food bank.

He was also president of the Banque populaire du Sud-Ouest between 1988 and 1998, of which he was honorary president from 1999 on, as well as president of the Defense and Promotion Association of Pyla-sur-Mer.

== Personal life ==
=== Family ===
Jean-Paul Jauffret's younger brother, François Jauffret, is a retired professional tennis player, who holds the record for selection in the French Davis Cup team (35 caps), and was France's tennis champion nine times, reached the finals of the French Open twice, and winner of several international titles in the 1960s and 1970s. His granddaughter Capucine Jauffret played for Team USA at the Under 14 Lacoste World Championship.

His brother Pierre (1937–2023), was also French cadet and junior champion and participated in the second round of the 1963 edition of the French Open.

His sister Christine was a teacher and school principal before founding the Plateaux school, intended for students excluded from the school system, which then became the farm school of the village of Plateaux and also welcomes juvenile delinquents entrusted by the Ministry of justice.

His brother Marc was the financial director of the French Mobil Oil.

Jean-Paul Jauffret died on 27 June 2026, at the age of 95.

== Distinctions ==
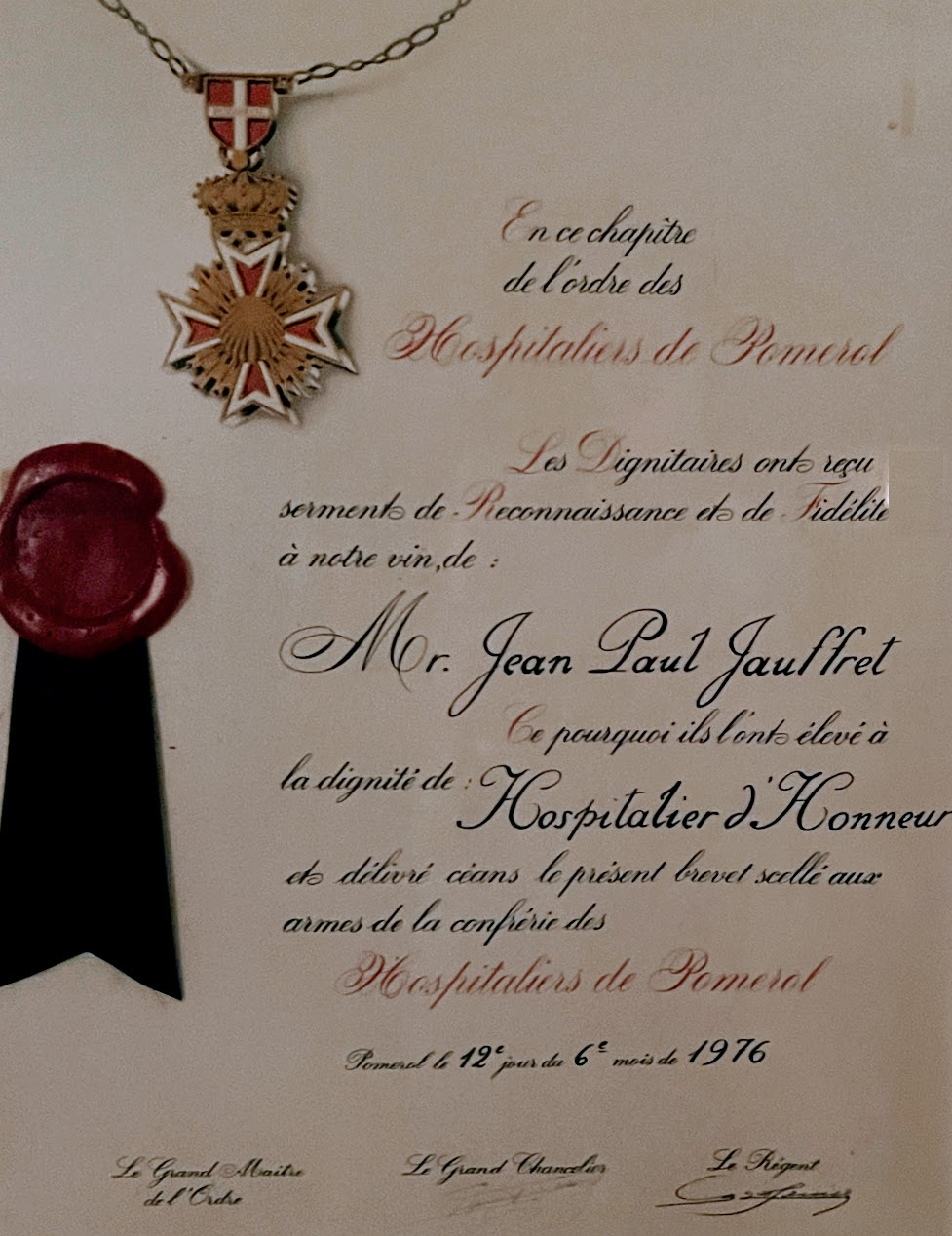
- Certificate of an Honorary Hospitaller of the Order of Hospitallers of Pomerol
  Knight of the French Legion of Honor (promotion of July 14, 1988, presented by Jacques Chaban-Delmas in Bordeaux)
- Knight of the French National Order of Merit
- Commander of the French Order of Sports Merit
- Commander of the Commanderie du Bontemps du Médoc, Graves, Sauternes, and Barsac (1969)
- Fellow Sworn Officer of the Confrérie du Guillon of the Vaudois vineyard (1972)
- Knight of the Confrérie des Chevaliers du Tastevin of Burgondy (1977)
- Honorary Hospitaller of the Order of Hospitallers of Pomerol (1976)
- Commander of the Bontemps Commandery of Sainte Croix du Mont (1978)
- Prud’homme de la Jurade de St Émilion (1979)
- Grand Bailiff of Honor of the Baillis of Lalande de Pomerol (1985)
- Honorary alderman of the College of Aldermen of Lussac and Puysseguin (1989)
- Knight of the Buzet Wine Brotherhood (2004)
- Honorary Shepherd of the Brotherhood of the Lamb of Pauillac (2004)
- Musketeer of the Company of Musketeers of Armagnac Chevalier de l'ordre national du Mérite

== See also ==
- Vinexpo
- François Jauffret
- Conseil Interprofessionnel du Vin de Bordeaux
