= Henri Martin (winemaker) =

French winemaker (1903–1991)

Henri Martin (1903 – February 1991) was a French winemaker who for forty years served as mayor of Saint-Julien-Beychevelle in Médoc, became cited as the person responsible for reviving the ancient fame of the village, owned and managed a number of prominent French wine estates, and became considered a legendary figure in the Bordeaux wine trade. He has been called l'Ame du Médoc (the soul of Médoc).

== Biography ==
Martin was born in 1903 at Château Gruaud-Larose where his grandfather then was maître de chai and his father Alfred Martin a cooper, the family having lived in the region for more than three centuries.

Martin served as president of CIVB from 1956 to the mid 60s, was a co-founder and leader of the Commanderie de Bordeaux, and was a leading figure in Le Bontemps du Médoc. He was also a vocal opponent of the Bordeaux Wine Official Classification of 1855.

== Wine estates ==
Martin built his own estate Château Gloria from the ground, with no historical reputation or other advantages such as applying for the Cru bourgeois classification, although by acquiring desirable vineyards from classed crus, to become one of Saint-Julien's best-known properties, within the space of a generation. The process began in 1942 with the purchase of 6 hectares (15 acres) of vines. With the help of his father who was initially angered by the initiative, the acquisition of land grew to amass 48 hectares (120 acres).

In 1963, Martin was also appointed manager, along with Jean-Paul Gardère, of the premier cru Château Latour when foreign investors gained control of the estate, and Martin became a driving force of innovations in research and investments of restorations and vineyard acquisitions as well as replanting. Martin and Gardère formally resigned from the Conseil d'Administration in 1987, marking the end of a 24-year era.

With the personal ambition to own a classed growth, this was achieved in 1982 at age of 78 when Martin bought Château Saint-Pierre, a quatrième cru where his father had once worked, and set out to improve, with noticeable results. The estate is currently home to his daughter Françoise and her husband Jean-Louis Triaud, current general manager of the estates under Domaines Henri Martin. Martin died in February 1991.
