= Château Latour =

Chateau of Bordeaux

Coordinates: 45°10′36″N 0°44′42″W

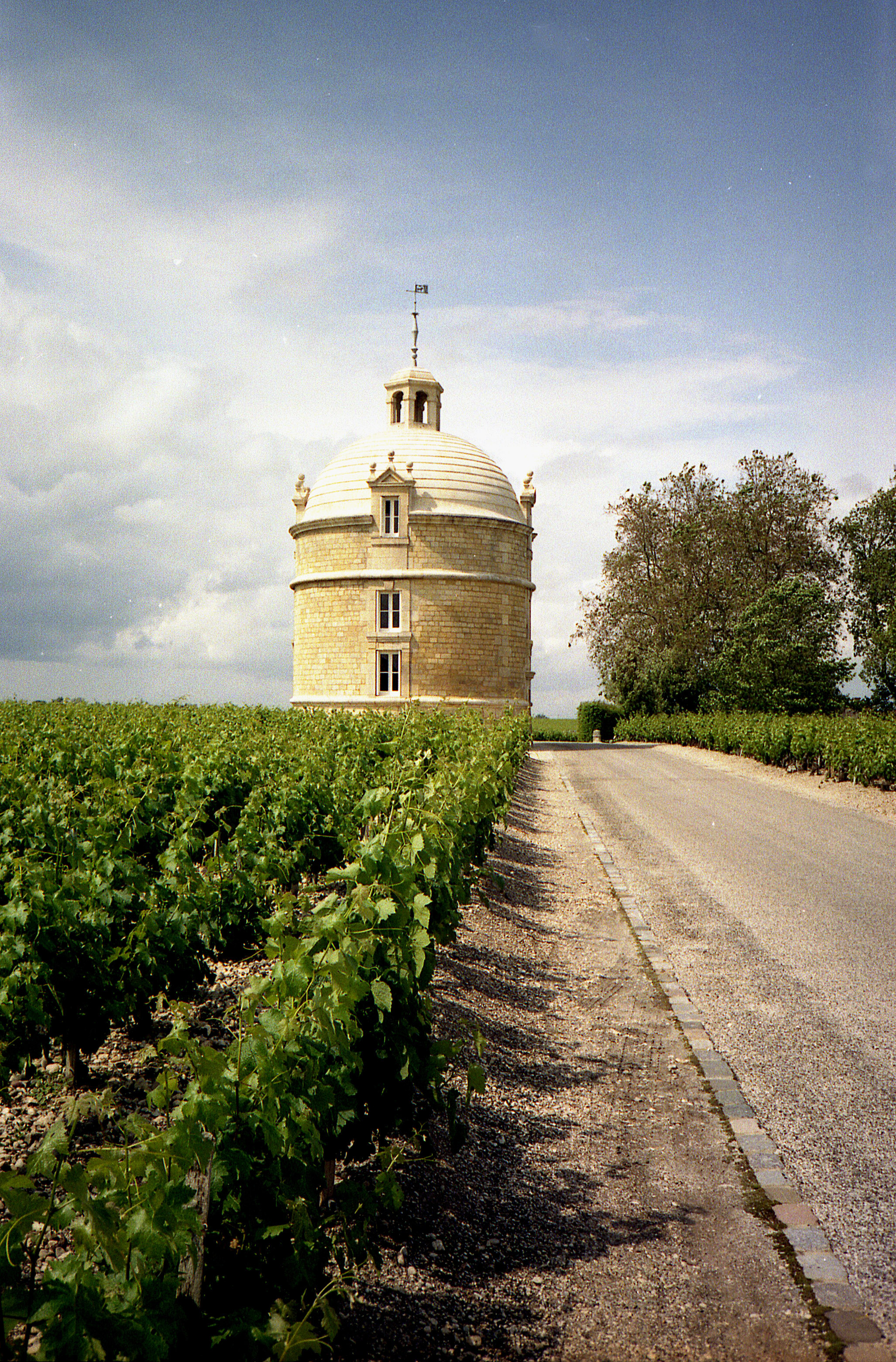
The tower at Château Latour

Château Latour is a French wine estate, rated as a First Growth under the 1855 Bordeaux Classification. Latour lies at the very southeastern tip of the commune of Pauillac in the Médoc region to the north-west of Bordeaux, at its border with Saint-Julien, and only a few hundred metres from the banks of the Gironde estuary.

The estate produces three red wines in all. In addition to its Grand vin (LWIN 1012316), Latour has also produced the second wine Les Forts de Latour (LWIN 1010309) since 1966, and a third wine, simply named Pauillac (LWIN 1013821), has been released every year since 1989. An impériale (six-litre bottle) of 1961 Château Latour sold for £135,000 in 2011.

== History ==
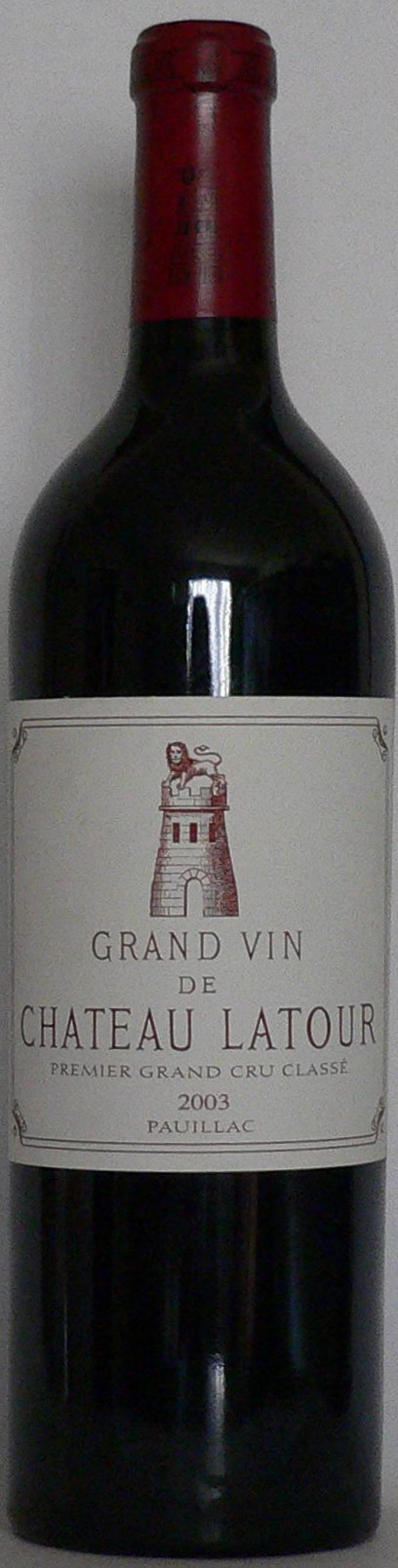
A bottle of 2003 Château Latour

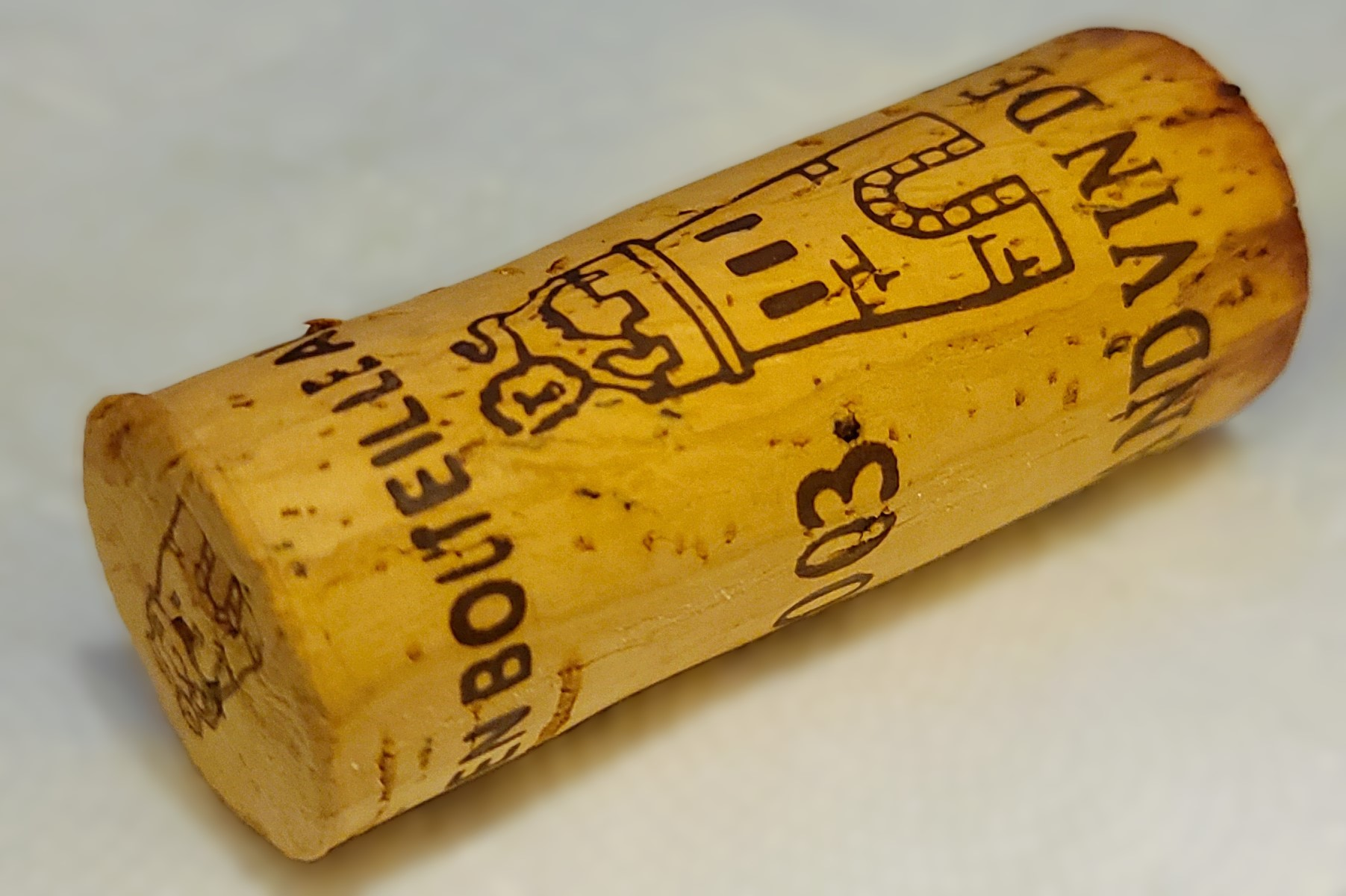
Cork

The site has been occupied since at least 1331 when Tor à Saint-Lambert was built by Gaucelme de Castillon, and the estate dating to at least 1378. A garrison fort was built 300 metres from the estuary to guard against attack during the Hundred Years' War. The tower, the name mutating with time to La Tour en Saint-Mambert and Saint-Maubert, gave its name to the estate around the fortress and was in English hands until the Battle of Castillon in 1453, and its complete destruction by the forces of the King of France. The original tower no longer exists, but in the 1620s a circular tower (La Tour de Saint-Lambert) was built on the estate named after Simon Ledwidge and though it is actually designed as a pigeon roost, it remains a strong symbol of the vineyard. Though two centuries apart, this building is said to have been constructed using the original edifice.

Vines have existed on the site since the 14th century, and Latour's wine received some early recognition, discussed as early as in the 16th century in Essays by Montaigne. Near the end of the 16th century, the estate's several smallholdings had been accumulated by the de Mullet family into one property.

From 1670 began a lineage of connected family ownership not broken until 1963, when the estate was acquired by the de Chavannes family, and passed by marriage to the de Clauzel family in 1677. When Alexandre de Ségur married Marie-Thérèse de Clauzel, Latour became a part of his vast property, to which he also added Château Lafite in 1716, just prior to his death. In 1718 his son Nicolas-Alexandre de Ségur added Château Mouton and Château Calon-Ségur to his holdings and began producing wines of great quality. The widespread reputation of Latour emerged at the beginning of the 18th century when its status was established on export markets such as England, alongside chateaux Lafite, Margaux and Pontac.

With the death of Nicolas-Alexandre Ségur in 1755 the estate was divided among four daughters, three of whom inherited Latour in 1760, and with absent landlords, Latour was managed by a regisseur charged with efficient administration and thorough correspondence with the owners. Receiving more care than under the late owner whose favourite had been Lafite, Latour improved in the later half of the century, and later became a favourite of Thomas Jefferson, then minister to France, when he categorised La Tour de Ségur as a vineyard of first quality in 1787.

With the onset of the French Revolution, the property became divided. The Comte de Ségur-Cabanac fled France and his portion was auctioned off by the state in 1794, passing through several owners. The estate was not reunited until 1841, when the family succeeded in a plot to put the estate up for sale, and eventually emerged after an auction having regained the 20% shares owned by négociants Barton, Guestier and Johnston. The Société Civile de Château Latour was formed in 1842, exclusive to the family, who then had become shareholders.

Ahead of the International Exhibition in Paris, the selection of Latour as one of the four First Growths in the Classification of 1855 consolidated its reputation, and ensured its high prices. The present château was completed in 1864.

=== Modern history ===
Château Latour presentation card dated 1931, demonstrating the designs of the early 20th century, the label, cork, case and capsule markings

In 1963 the estate finally left the Ségur family, then named de Beaumont, when the heirs sold three-quarters of the Château Latour shares to the British interests of the Pearson Group under control of Lord Cowdray, with shares owned by Harvey's of Bristol. Henri Martin and Jean-Paul Gardère were appointed as managers which brought about substantial innovations. Investments were made in research, vineyards were expanded by acquisition and replanting, the chai was extended and Latour became the first of the first growths to modernise their whole production, replacing the old oak fermenting vats with stainless steel temperature-controlled vats. The second wine with fruit from younger vines was initiated, and fruit for the grand vin was decided to come exclusively from the vineyards shown on the plan of the domain from 1759. Martin and Gardère formally resigned from the Conseil d'Administration in 1987, ending a 24-year era.

In 1989 Latour was purchased by Allied Lyons for around £110 million, but in 1993 returned to French ownership when bought by businessman François Pinault for £86 million when it became part of his holding company Groupe Artemis.

In December 2008 it was reported that the investment bank Lazard was offering the estate for sale. The Sunday Times speculated that among the interested parties were wine mogul Bernard Magrez, with actors Gérard Depardieu and Carole Bouquet, in a transaction which would bring one of the five first growths under the control of a resident Bordelais for the first time in several decades.

== Production ==
The estate has 78 hectares (190 acres) of vineyard, of which a 47-hectare (120-acre) portion near the château is named l'Enclos, where fruit exclusive to the grand vin is grown. The composition of grape varieties is 80% Cabernet Sauvignon, 18% Merlot, and 2% of Cabernet Franc and Petit Verdot.

The grand vin Chateau Latour, typically a blend of 75% Cabernet Sauvignon, 20% Merlot, with the remainder Petit Verdot and Cabernet Franc, normally has an annual production of 18,000 cases. The second wine Les Forts de Latour, typically 70% Cabernet Sauvignon and 30% Merlot, has an average annual production of 11,000 cases. Beginning in 1989, the estate began producing a third wine, Pauillac de Latour.

== Price ==
The estate's grand vin is one of the most expensive Cabernet Sauvignon-Merlot wines made in the Médoc region and retails at an average price of $793 for a 750 ml bottle.

== Gallery ==
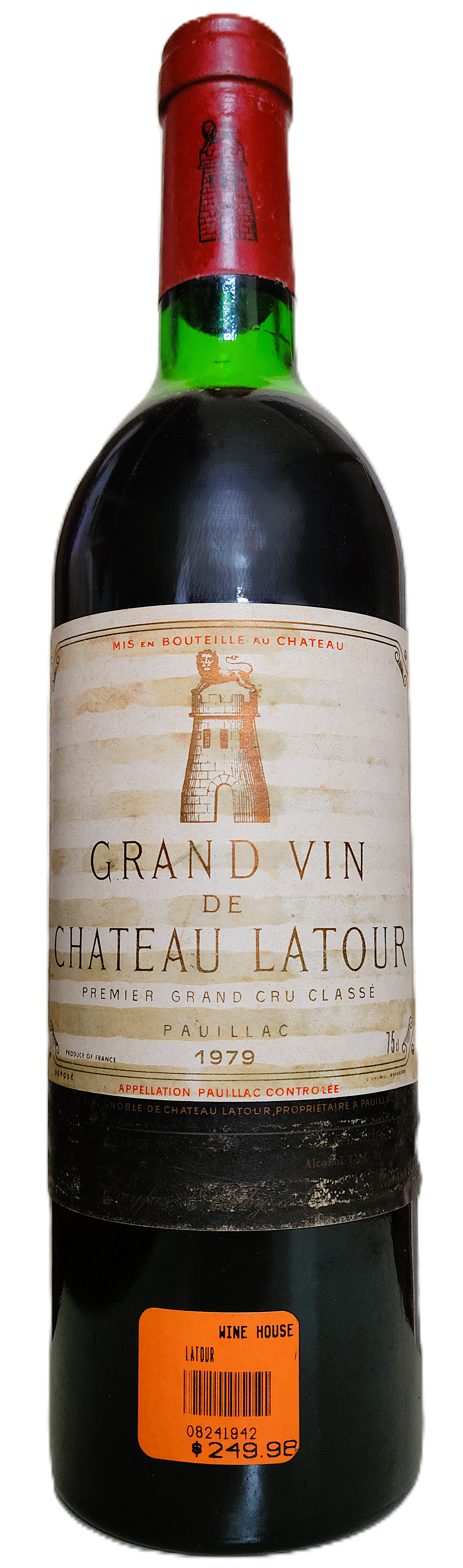
Grand Vin 1979

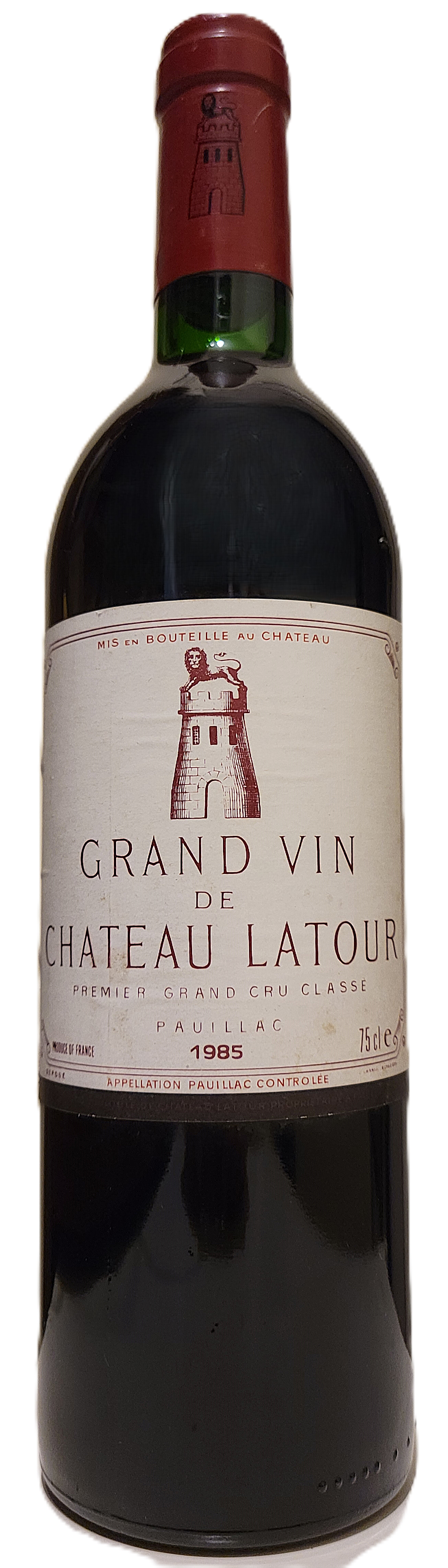
Grand Vin 1985
