= Château Saint-Pierre =

Coordinates: 45.14715°N 0.74272°W

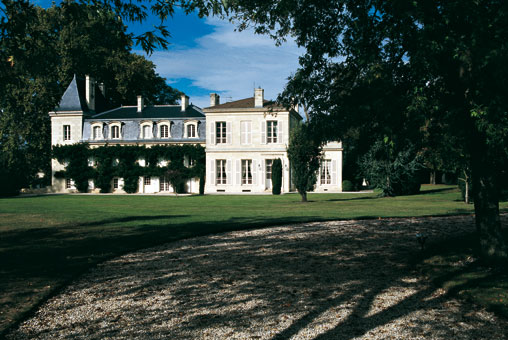
The Château, 2010

Château Saint-Pierre is a winery in the Saint-Julien appellation of the Bordeaux region of France. The wine produced here was classified as one of ten Quatrièmes Crus Classés (Fourth Growths) in the historic Bordeaux Wine Official Classification of 1855.

There is another Château Saint Pierre at Toutens in the Lauragais 30 km east of Toulouse, which dates from the 18th century and is one of the château of the froment.

== History ==
Originally owned by the De Cheverry family, from at least 1693 according to archives and under the name Serançan, the estate was renamed near the end of the 18th century when it was bought by Baron de Saint-Pierre, whose family connections to the estate remained until just after World War II.

For a period beginning in 1832, the estate was split into two vineyards, Château Saint-Pierre-Bontemps and Château Saint-Pierre-Sevaistre, but became reunited under the Dutch company Van den Bussche's ownership, although some of the best sections of the vineyard was sold to Henri Martin who incorporated the land into his Château Gloria.

In 1982 Martin bought the complete estate, and while selling some land to neighbouring Ducru-Beaucaillou and Gruaud-Larose, restored the château and brought improvements to the vinification. The current proprietors of the estate and residents of the château are Martin's daughter and son-in-law, Françoise and Jean-Louis Triaud.

== Production ==
The vineyard extends to 17 hectares (42 acres), with a grape variety distribution of 75% Cabernet Sauvignon, 15% Merlot and 10% Cabernet Franc. After harvesting, the grapes are transported to the chai of Château Gloria where the wine is produced.

The annual production of the grand vin is approximately 5,000 cases, and with no second wine, the rejected and surplus fruit is sold off in bulk to local merchants.
