= Château La Louvière =

French chateau near Bordeaux

Coordinates: 44°44′15″N 0°34′45″W

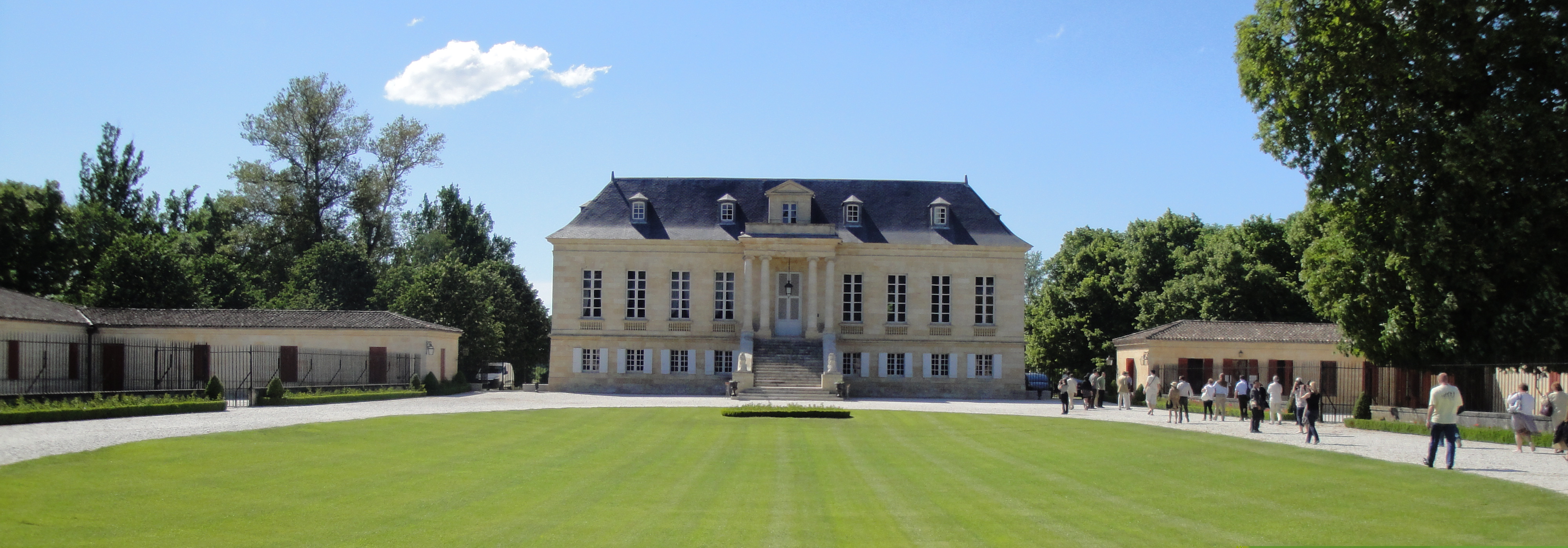
Château La Louvière, the main building as seen from the main entrance.

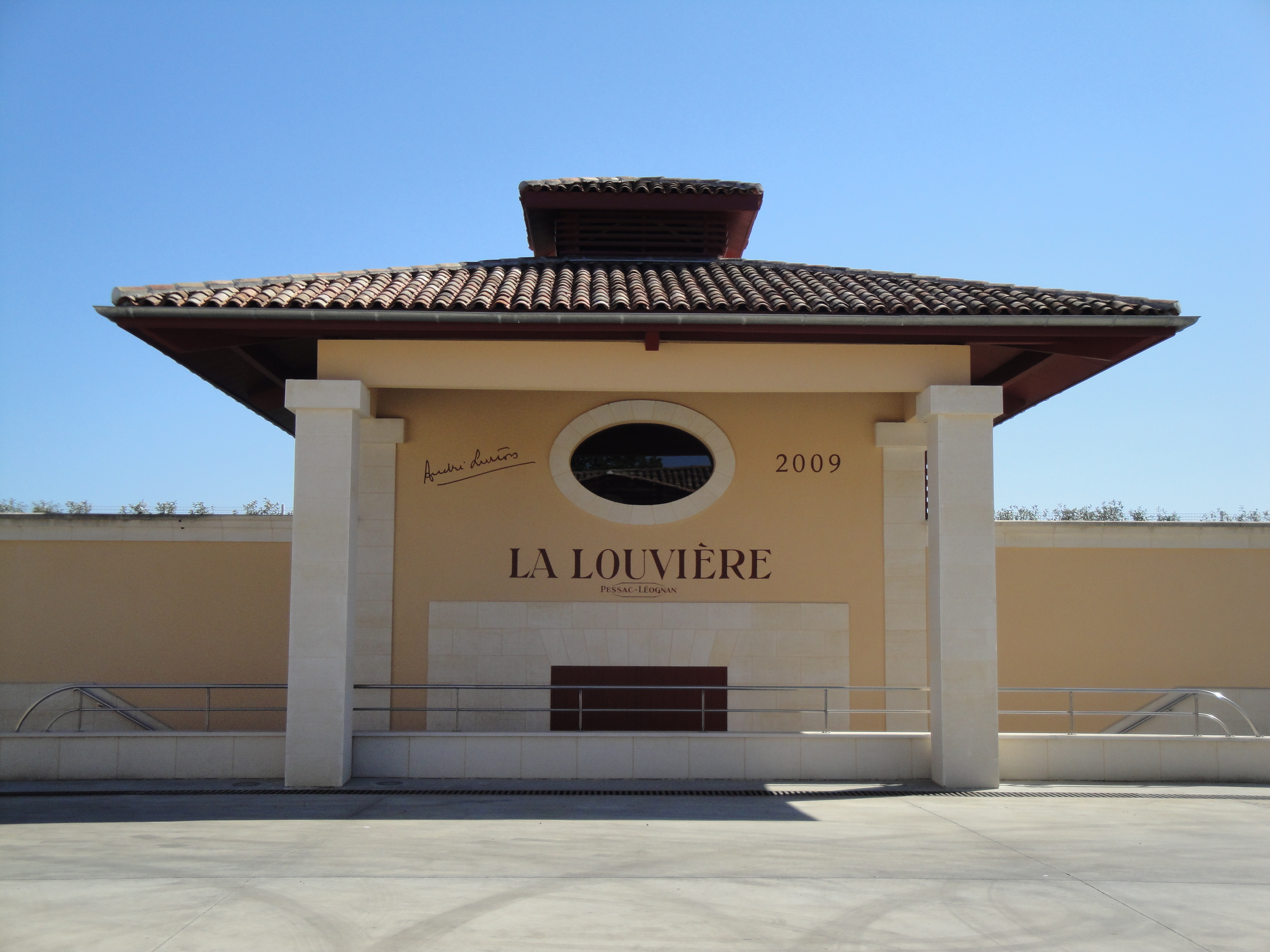
A recently built part of the winery of Château La Louvière.

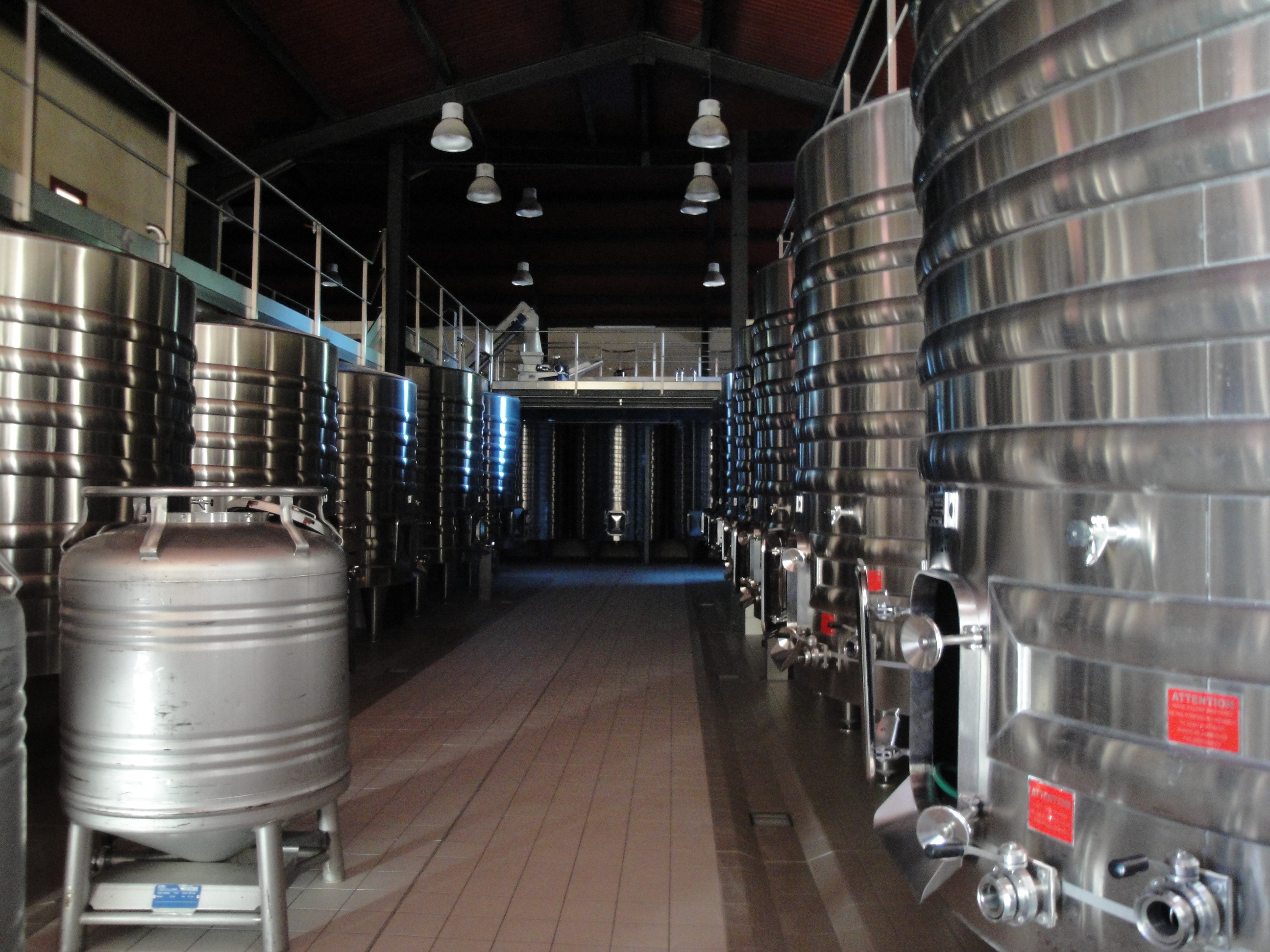
Winery of Château La Louvière, with temperature-controlled steel tanks.

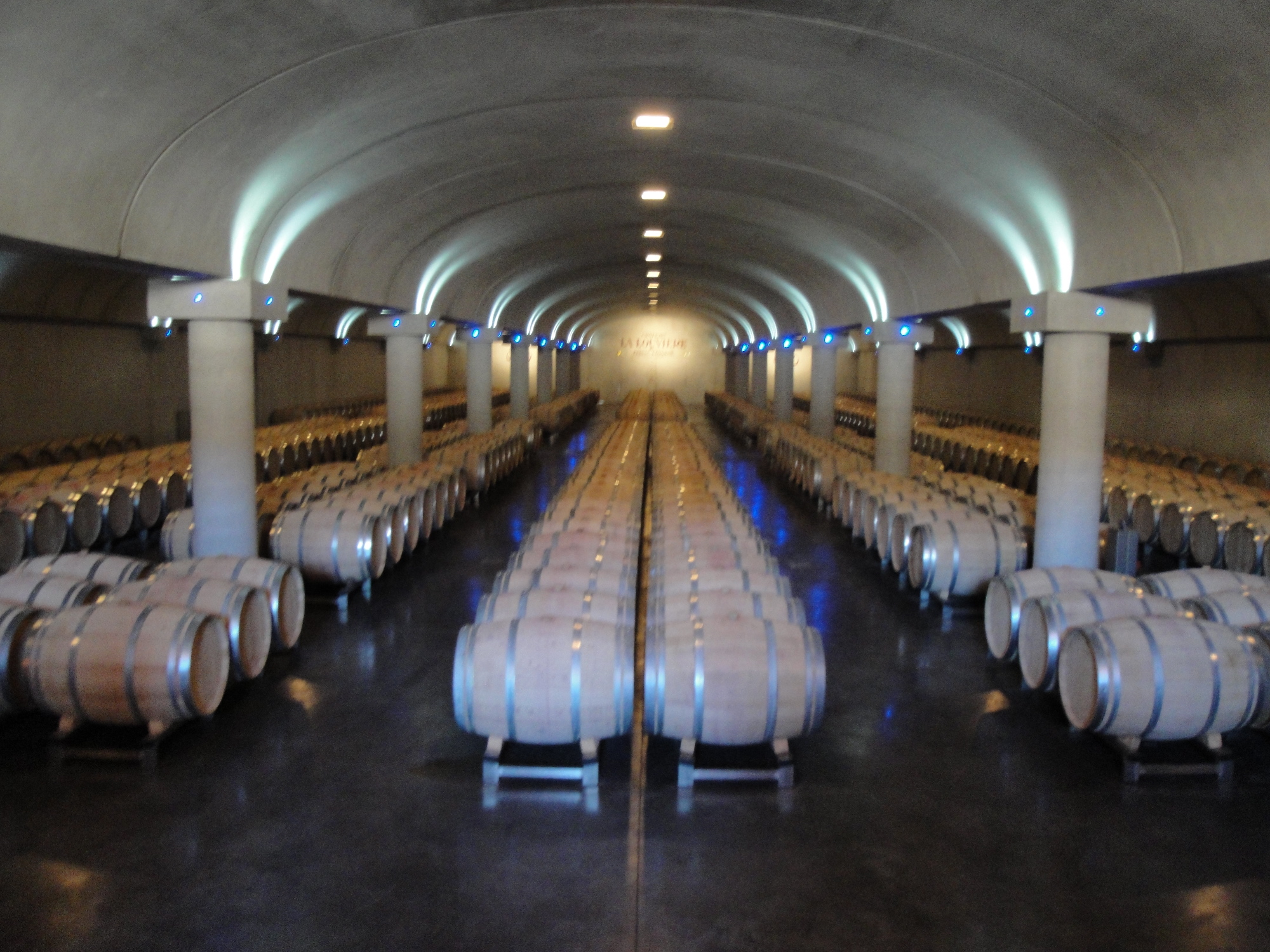
Barrel cellar of Château La Louvière

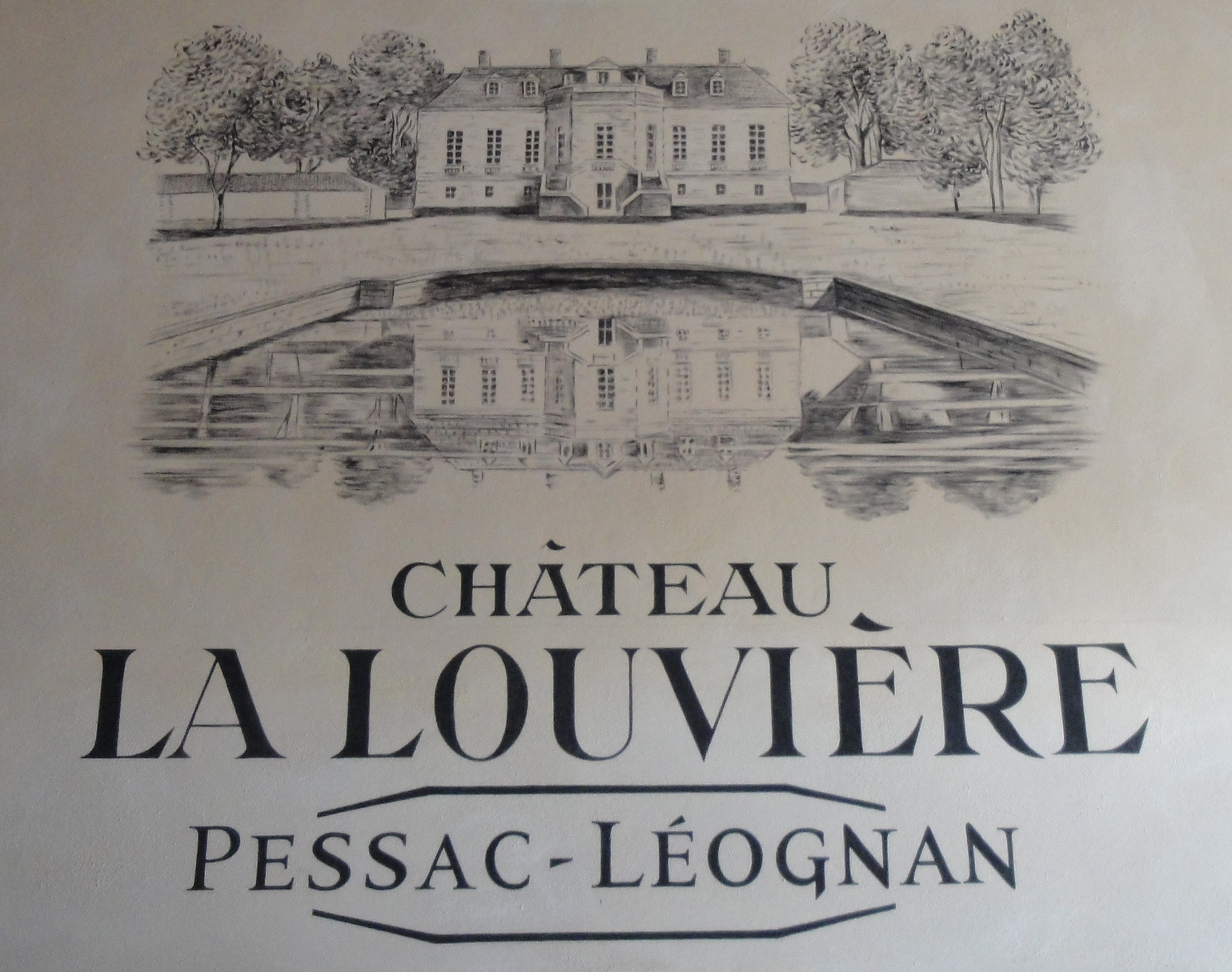
Entrance to the barrel cellar of Château La Louvière

Château La Louvière is a Bordeaux wine producer from the Pessac-Léognan appellation of Bordeaux. The château is located in the commune of Léognan. It was owned by André Lurton from 1965 to his death in 2019.

== History ==
The first small vineyard on the estate was planted in 1476, in a location named La Lobeyra, on land owned by the Guilloche family since 1398. During the period from 1510 to 1550 many land plots were acquired by Pierre de Guilloche and his son Jean de Guilloche. Lady Roquetaillade, the heiress to the Guilloche family, sold La Louvière in 1618 to Arnaud de Gascq, abbot of the Abbey of Saint-Ferme. He donated it in 1620 to Notre Dame de Miséricorde, a Carthusian Order in Bordeaux. At this stage the property was in a poor state, but was restored by the monks. Under the monks' management, both red and white wines were produced during the early parts of the 17th century, and shipped to customers in Picardy, England and Flanders.

In November 1789, following the French Revolution, the Assemblée Nationale confiscated all church property, which included the Carthusian-owned La Louvière. Following the confiscation, it was auctioned off to the Bordeaux wine merchant Jean-Baptiste Mareilhac in 1791. Marheilhac also built a modern château building on the estate. The château, designed by François Lhote, is a listed historical monument since 1991.

The Mareilhac family continued as owners for most part of the 19th century. From 1911 to 1944, La Louvière was run by Alfred Bertrand-Taquet, who was also mayor of Léognan from 1919 until the start of Second World War. After the war, it had absentee landlords and was neglected for a long period. In 1965, it was purchased by André Lurton, who embarked on restoration of both the château and of the vineyards.

== Vineyard ==
Château La Louvière has 48 hectares (120 acres) planted to red grape varieties (64% Cabernet Sauvignon, 30% Merlot, 3% Cabernet Franc and 3% Petit Verdot), and 13.5 hectares (33 acres) planted to white grape varieties (85% Sauvignon blanc and 15% Sémillon).

== Wines ==
Château La Louvière is produced as both a red wine and a white wine. Both are vinified 12 months in oak barrels, of which 50-75% new for the red wine 50% new for the white wine.

The second wine is called L de La Louvière and is also produced as both a red wine and a white wine. The second wine is also vinified 12 months in oak barrels, but with slightly less new oak.
