= Château de Rochemorin =

Wine Producer based in Bordeaux, France

Coordinates: 44°43′17″N 0°33′45″W

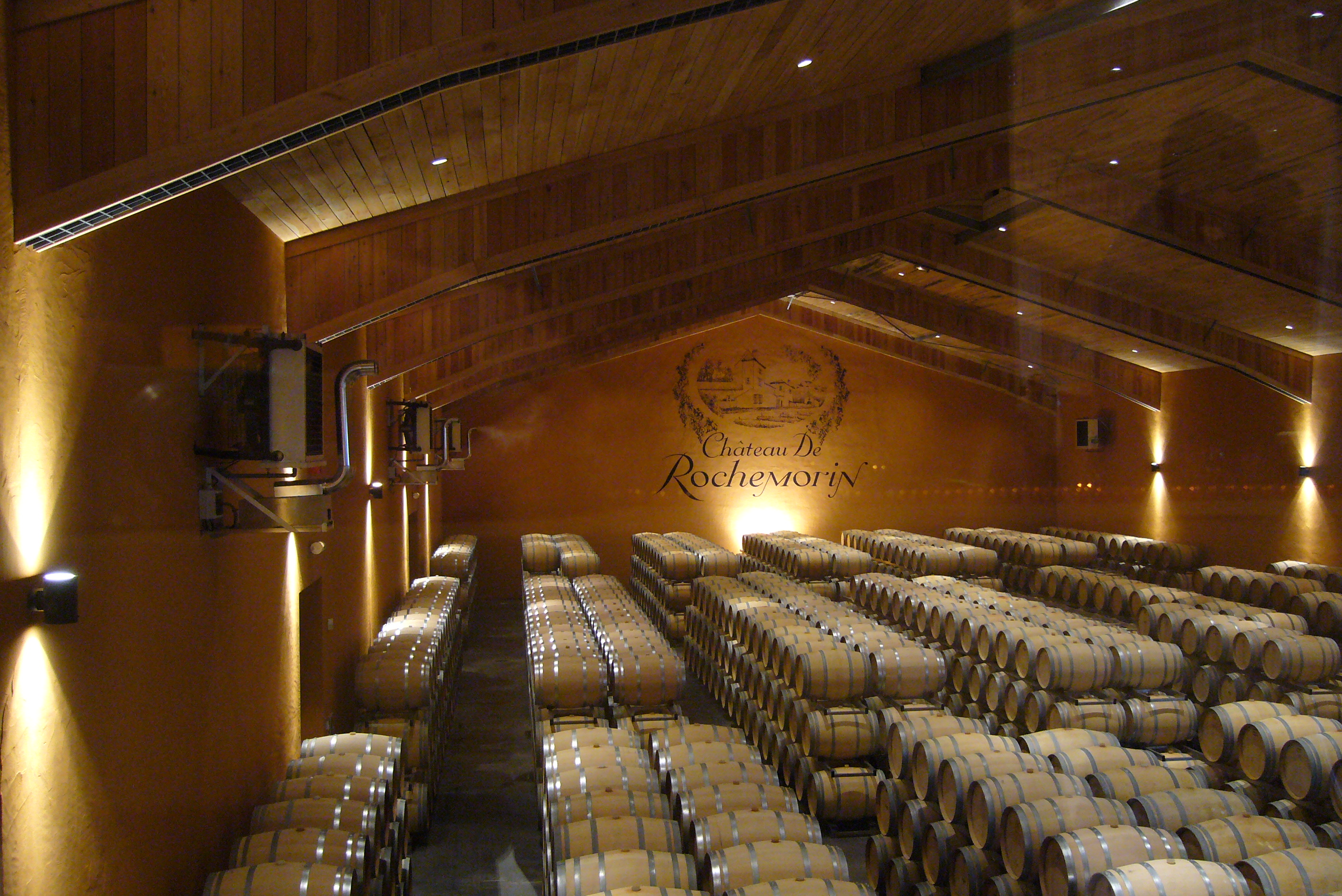
Barrel cellar at Château de Rochemorin

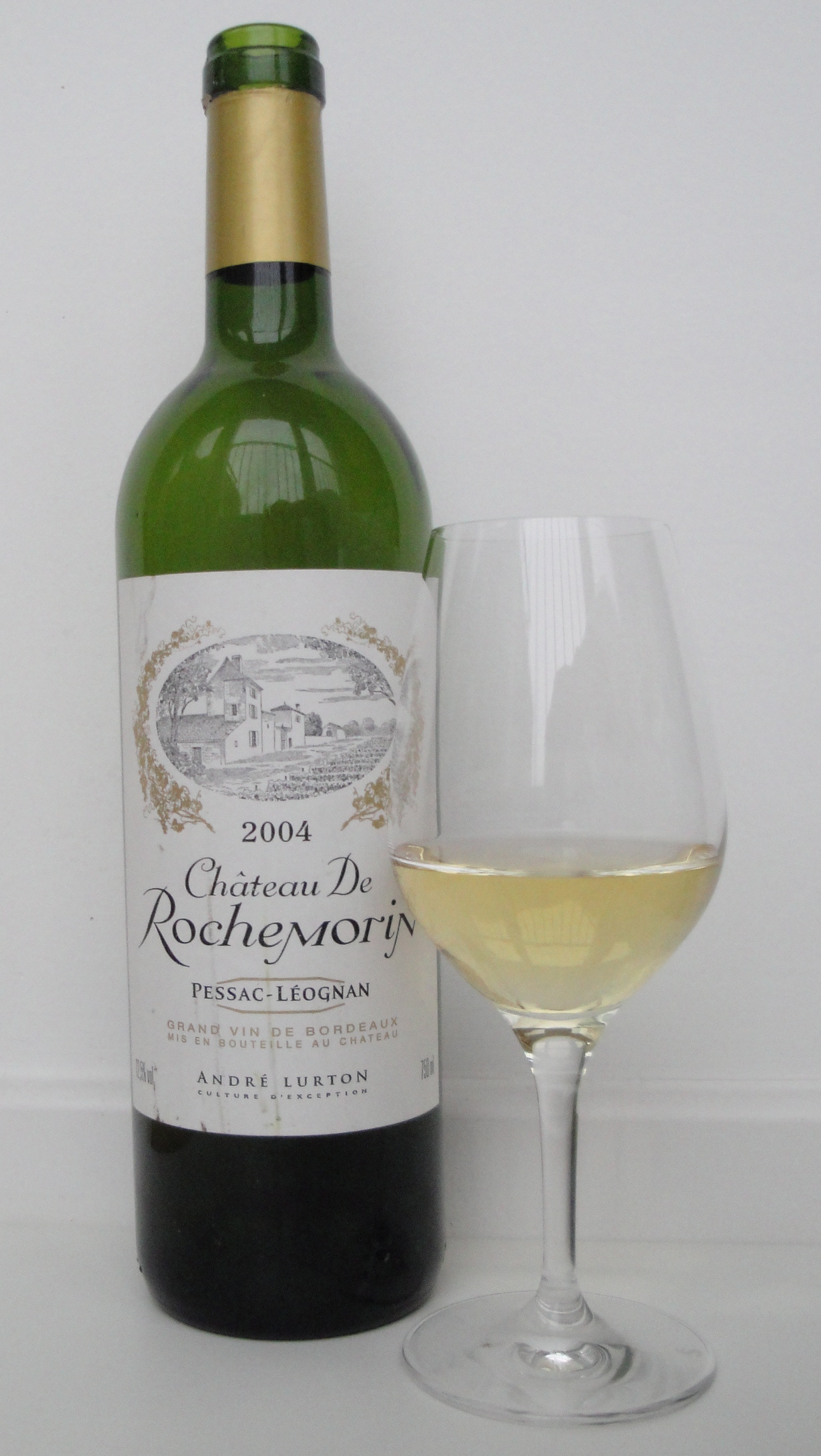
The white wine of Château de Rochemorin

Château de Rochemorin is Bordeaux wine producer from the Pessac-Léognan appellation of Bordeaux. The château is located in the commune of Martillac. Château de Rochemorin is owned by André Lurton since 1973.
