= Conseil Interprofessionnel du Vin de Bordeaux =

French wine industry organization

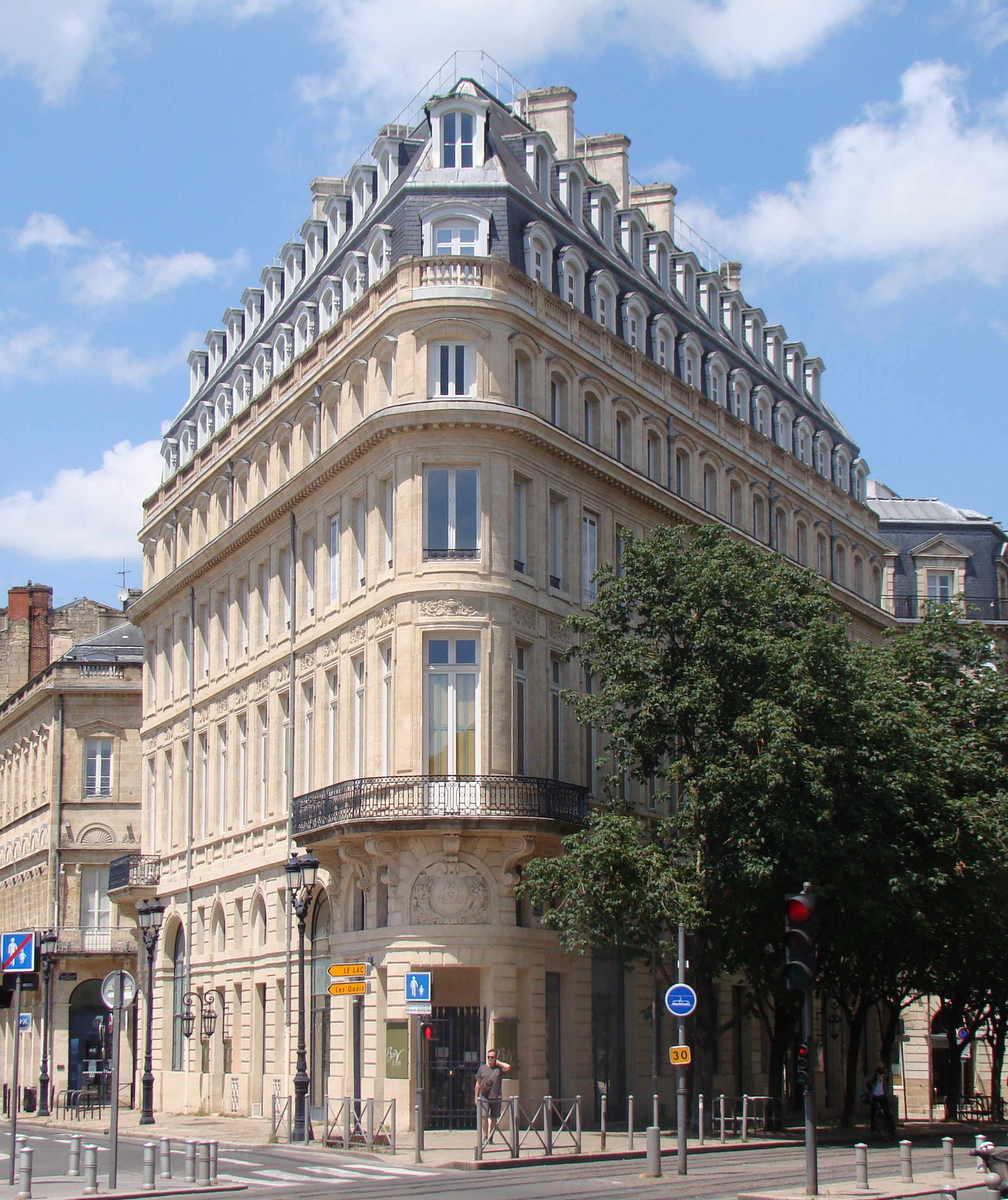
Maison Gobineau, head office of the CIVB.

Le Conseil Interprofessionnel du Vin de Bordeaux, or CIVB, the Bordeaux wine Bureau, created in 1948, is a French interest group that represents nearly 10,000 Bordeaux wine producers and growers, and 400 négociants. It is by some estimated to be the most important wine industry body in France.

A private association under the responsibility of the Ministère de l'Agriculture (Ministry of Agricultural Affairs), CIVB seeks to promote the interests of its members via national and international communications channels, conduct research into market trends in both production to distribution, and address viticulturally technical issues of quality, environmental and heritage concerns.

Presidents of the organisation are elected for two-year terms by the membership, chosen alternately from growers and négociants. The position, in charge of a €22m budget, is considered one of the most powerful positions in Bordeaux. The current president of CIVB is Alain Vironneau, and past presidents include Henri Martin, Eric Dulong, Jean-Louis Trocard and Christian Delpeuch. Jean-Paul Jauffret, a former president, is the honorary president of CIVB.

== See also ==
- Bordeaux wine
