= Vinexpo =

Wine and spirits exhibition in Bordeaux, France

Coordinates: 44.894°N 0.573°W

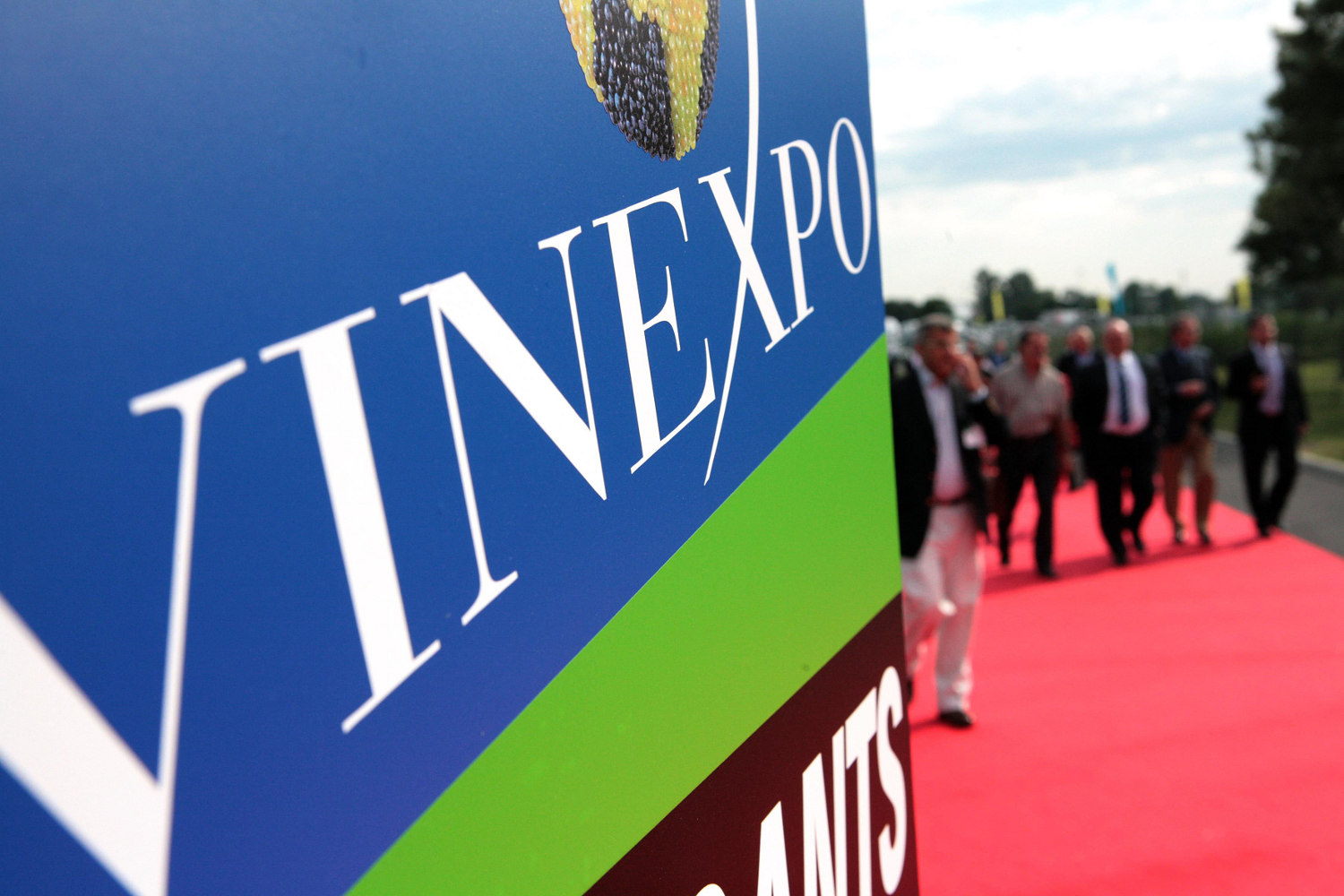
Panneau Vinexpo Bordeaux logo from event in 2007

Vinexpo is one of the largest exhibitions for wine and spirits professionals from all over the world, held in Bordeaux in uneven years. The first event dates back to year 1981 gathering 524 exhibitors from 21 countries 11,000 professional visitors from 50 countries. In 2015 it grew to 2,350 exhibitors (2,400 in 2013) from 42 countries. Current Vinexpo Chief Executive Officer is Guillaume Deglise who was appointed in September, 2013 and left the company after Vinexpo Hong Kong 2018.

== History ==
Vinexpo was created in 1981 and since then has grown and established itself as the key event for major international operators in the wine and spirits sector. During the years its activities expanded beyond the actual exhibition and since 1989 Vinexpo has become a partner for spirits professionals to reflect on trends to anticipate new markets. Vinexpo also commissions studies on industry-specific issues, such as world market study with a 5-year outlook, reports on young people and wine. The findings are then presented in conferences around the world before each exhibition.

To support the initiative of Responsible, balanced consumption of wine and spirits, between 1993 and 2009, Vinexpo also served as venue for the event Savoir Boire, Savoir Vivre organized by professional committees and organizations in order to debate on the relationship between alcohol and health.

In order to secure and extend its position as a leading benchmark, Vinexpo has set up a list of facilities and innovations:

- 1987: Introduction of Club des Marques (transformed into Club du Lac in 2007), a facility for the largest wine and spirits sales companies.
- 1991: Club Vinexpo opened exclusively for the 5,000 largest wine and spirits buyers worldwide, offering them privileged facilities and services.
- 1999 - 2013: During the Vinexpo events all participants could relax and enjoy themselves in the Themed gardens.
- 2007: A major innovation in the lay-out of Vinexpo 2007 was the introduction to the world's longest floating bridge, 430 meters (1,400 feet), linking two huge exhibition areas on opposite sides of the lake.
- 2009 - 2013: To celebrate its 15th exhibition in 2009, Vinexpo combined Wine and Art introducing and displaying 40 contemporary works, (55 in 2011 and 80 in 2013) that were loaned by galleries and collectors.
- 2013: Vinexpo sponsored and contributed to the building of La Cité des civilisations du vin (Centre for Wine Culture and Tourism) which will be inaugurated in Bordeaux in 2016. The first stone was ceremoniously laid on 19 June during Vinexpo.

Vinexpo has also launched Vinexpo Asia-Pacific in 1998, Vinexpo Americas held in 2002 (North America), Vinexpo Nippon in 2014 (Japan) and Vinexpo Hong Kong is coming up in 2016.
