= Château Beychevelle =

Winery in the Bordeaux region of France

Coordinates: 45.14504°N 0.73497°W

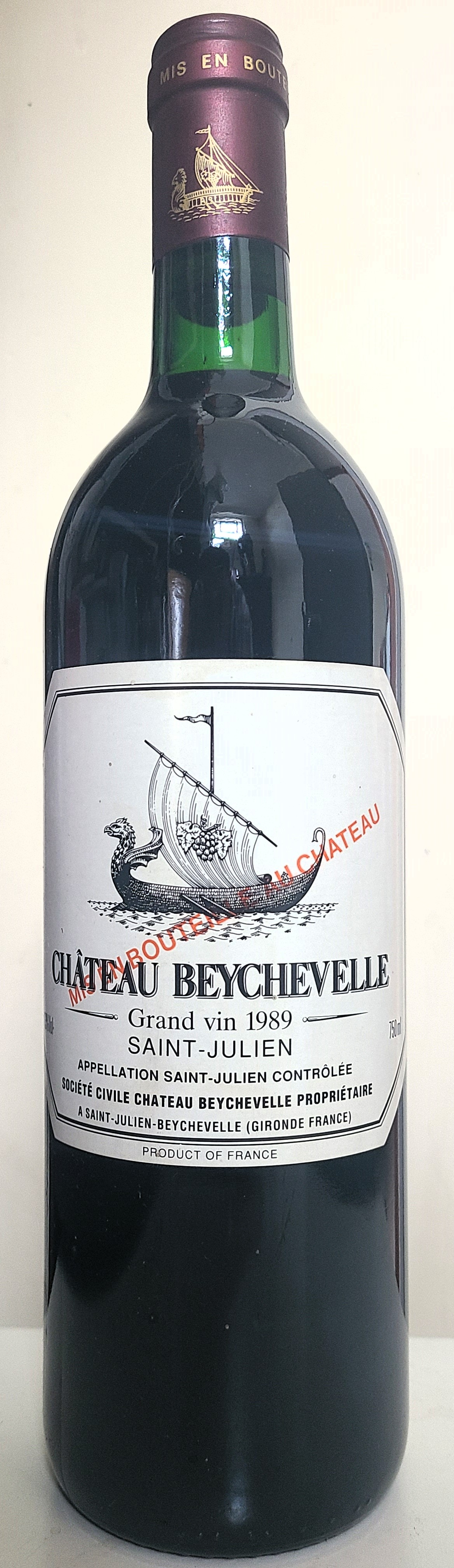
- Location: Saint-Julien, Bordeaux, France
- Appellation: Saint-Julien-Beychevelle

Château Beychevelle is a winery in the Saint-Julien appellation of the Bordeaux region of France. The wine produced here was classified as one of ten Quatrièmes Crus (Fourth Growths) in the historic Bordeaux Wine Official Classification of 1855. The chateau makes a second label wine called Amiral de Beychevelle.

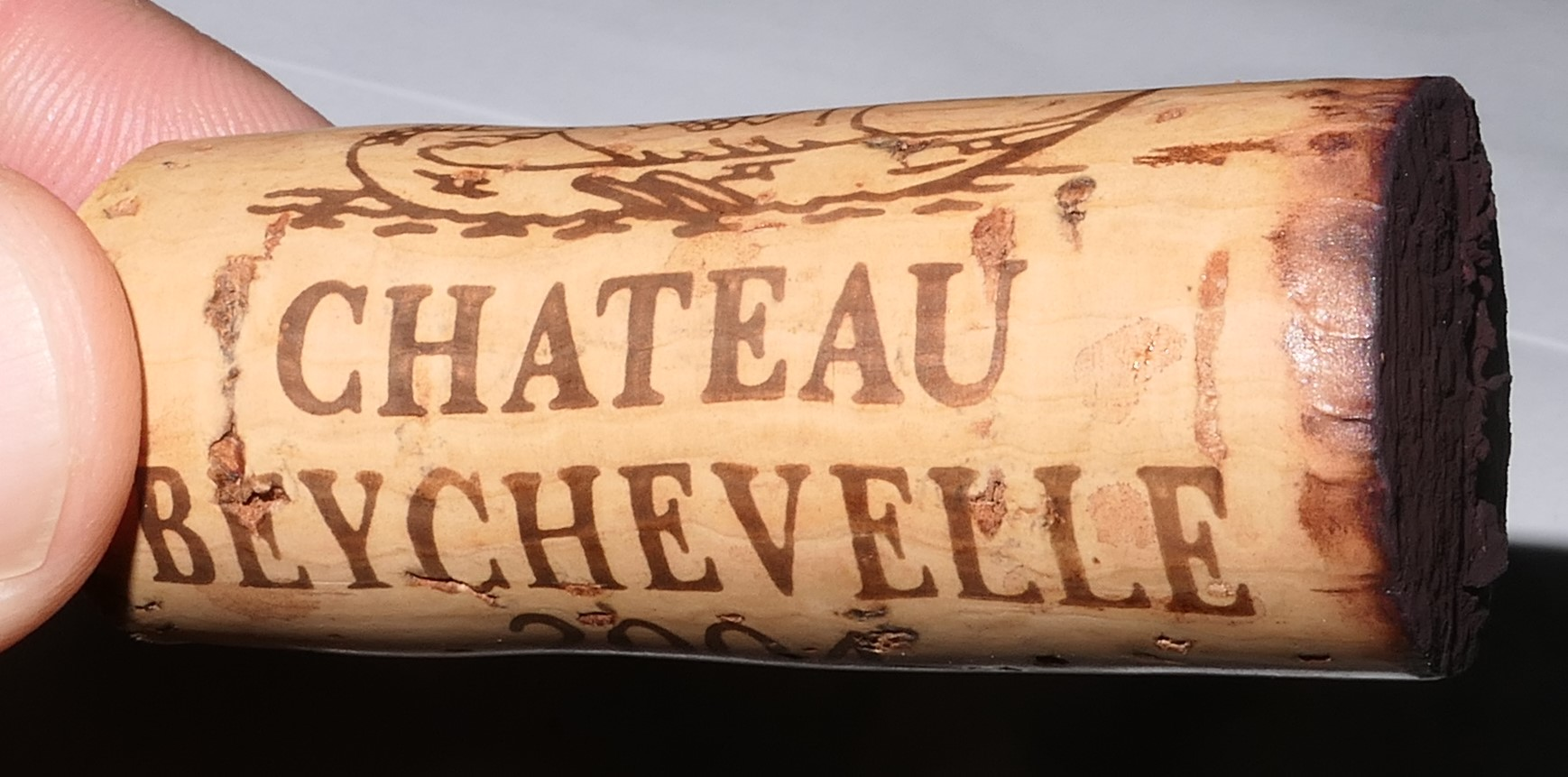

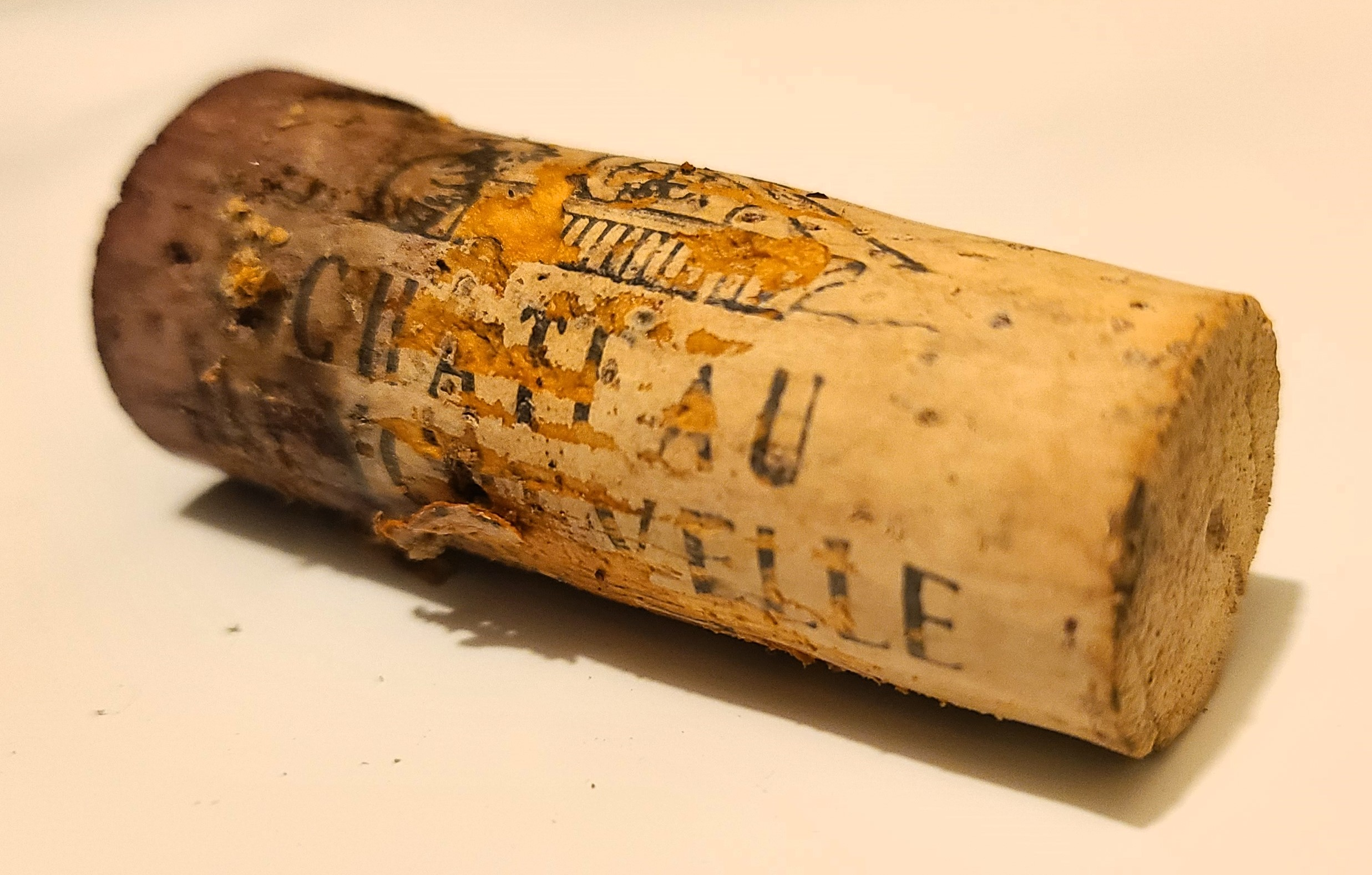
1989 Grand Vin Cork

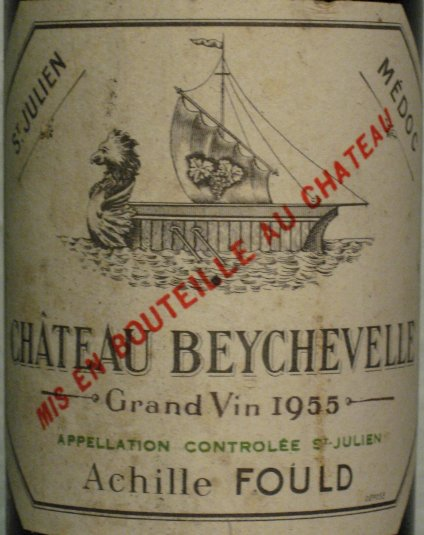
