= Saint-Julien-Beychevelle =

- Commune
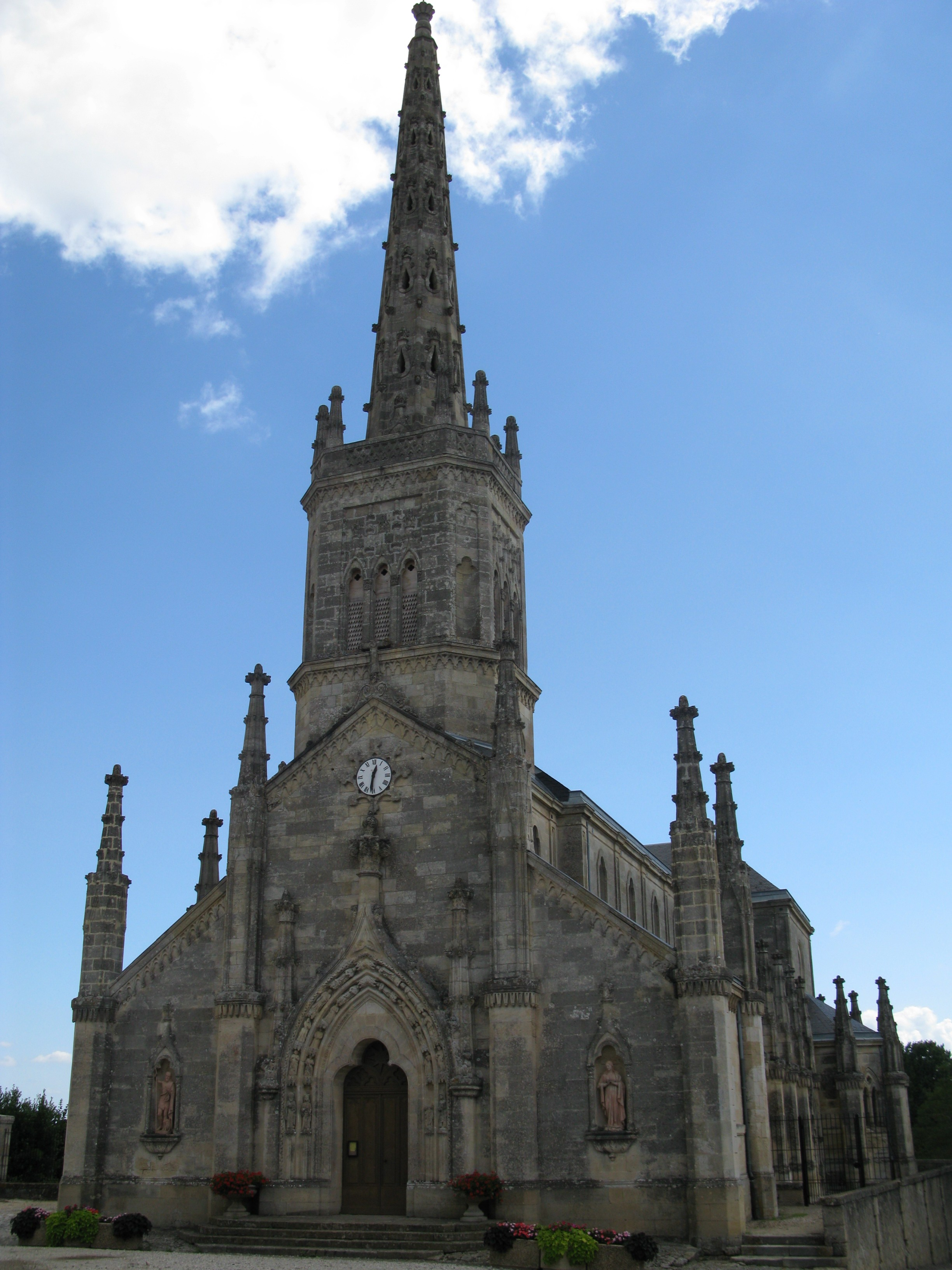
- The church in Saint-Julien-Beychevelle

- Coat of arms
- Location of Saint-Julien-Beychevelle
- Location within France Location within Nouvelle-Aquitaine
- Coordinates: 45°09′56″N 0°44′21″W
- Country: France
- Region: Nouvelle-Aquitaine
- Department: Gironde
- Arrondissement: Lesparre-Médoc
- Canton: Le Nord-Médoc

Government
  - Mayor (2020–2026): Lucien Bressan
- Area^{1}: 16.3 km^{2} (6.3 sq mi)
- Elevation: 16 m (52 ft)
- Highest elevation: 28 m (92 ft)
- Lowest elevation: 0 m (0 ft)
- Population (2023): 606
  - Density: 37.2/km^{2} (96.3/sq mi)
- Time zone: UTC+01:00 (CET)
  - Summer (DST): UTC+02:00 (CEST)
- INSEE/Postal code: 33423 /33250
- ^{1} French Land Register data, which excludes lakes, ponds, glaciers > 1 km^{2} (0.386 sq mi or 247 acres) and river estuaries.

Saint-Julien-Beychevelle (French pronunciation: [sɛ̃ ʒyljɛ̃ bɛʃvɛl]; Gascon: Sent Julian Vaisherèla) is a commune on the left bank of the Garonne estuary in the Gironde department in Nouvelle-Aquitaine in southwestern France.

== Population ==
Historical population
Year	Pop.	±% p.a.
1968	1,216	—
1975	1,160	−0.67%
1982	1,006	−2.01%
1990	873	−1.76%
1999	798	−0.99%
2007	719	−1.29%
2012	653	−1.91%
2017	595	−1.84%
2023	606	+0.31%
Source: INSEE

== Wine ==
The village lies 15 km (9.3 mi) northwest of Bordeaux and is considered by some to be the most underrated of the four major wine growing appellations of the Médoc.

The 9 km^{2} (3.5 sq mi) of vineyards around the villages of St-Julien and Beychevelle produce wine of relative lightness and balance. Its strength stems from the quality of its soil – the characteristic layer of gravel forcing the roots of the vine to go to extra depth to reach its nutrients, as well as retaining additional heat to see it through the cooling winds from the Atlantic away to the west.

St-Julien contains no First Growths but it does have estates ranked as Second, Third and Fourth Growths in the Bordeaux Wine Official Classification of 1855.

== See also ==
- Bordeaux wine regions
- Communes of the Gironde department
