= Pauillac AOC =

Wine growing commune in Bordeaux, France

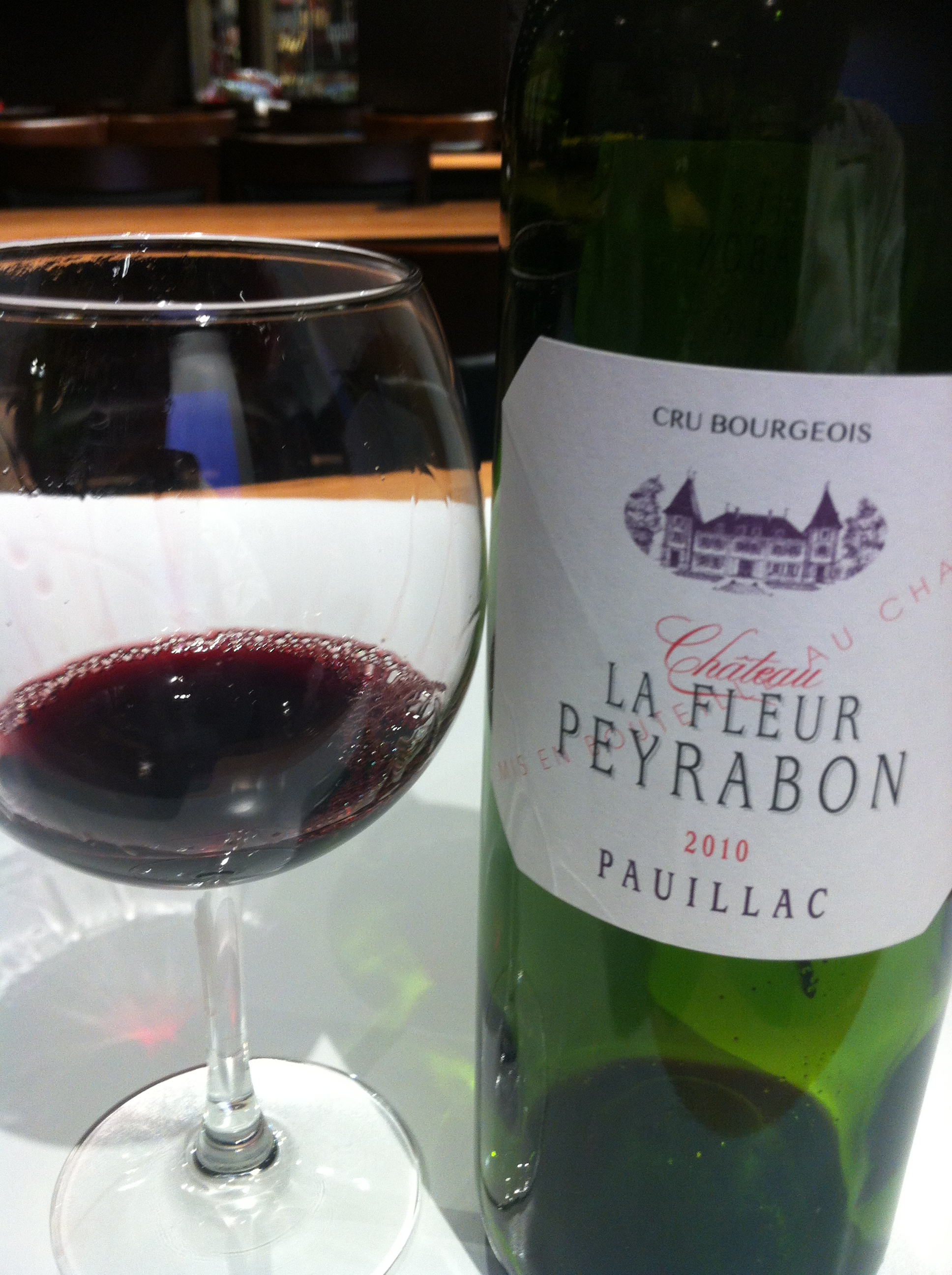
A Cru Bourgeois wine from Pauillac

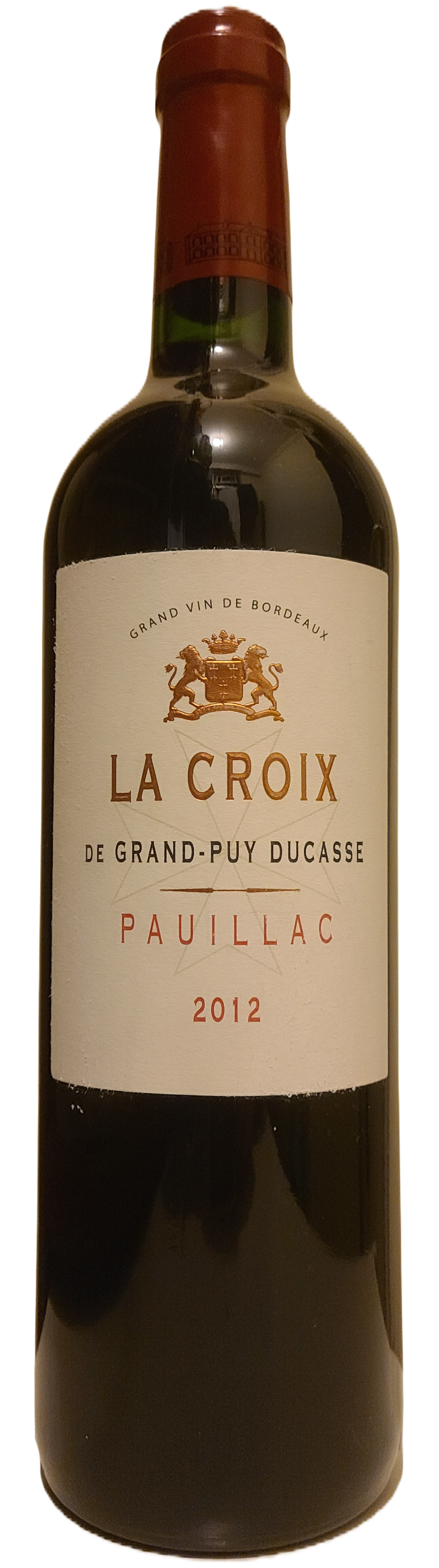
AOC wine from Pauillac

Pauillac ([po.jak]) is a wine growing commune (municipality) and appellation d'origine contrôlée within Haut-Médoc in Bordeaux, centred on the small town of Pauillac. Hugh Johnson has said, "If one had to single out one commune of Bordeaux to head the list, there would be no argument. It would be Pauillac.". Pauillac includes three of the five premier cru châteaux of Bordeaux: Latour, Lafite Rothschild and Mouton Rothschild. The wines of Pauillac are often considered the quintessence of Bordeaux wines.

== Geography ==
Pauillac is on the west bank of the Gironde, generally known as the "Left Bank". St-Julien is to the south. A stream called Ruisseau de Juillac marks part of the boundary between the two communes; other parts are marked by a stone wall and a country lane. To the north, across the Jalle du Breuil, lies St-Estèphe. Pauillac is bounded on the west by the parish of St Sauveur and the Landes forest. All three communes lie within the Haut-Médoc. The town of Pauillac is the largest in the Médoc, with a population of over 5,000. Pauillac is somewhat more elevated than the surrounding area, rising to a peak of nearly 30 metres above sea-level in the region of Château Pontet-Canet. The soil is gravelly, as with most of the Haut-Médoc. The forest to the west shelters the vines from the Atlantic winds. Pauillac contains around 1,200 hectares of vineyards.

== Wine ==
Cabernet Sauvignon is the predominant grape, but it is invariably blended with other grapes. As with all red Bordeaux, Merlot, Cabernet Franc, Petit Verdot, Malbec and Carménère may also be included in the blend (although wines will not necessarily include all six grapes). Prior to the 19th century, Malbec was predominant.

The style has been described as "stark". The predominant fruit flavour is usually blackcurrant, sometimes veering into plum. Pencil-shavings and cigar-box are also characteristic notes.

Wine from Pauillac may be labelled as Haut-Médoc (usually wine which the château considers inferior to its main offering and wishes to market under a different label). Similarly, second (or third) wines from the grandes châteaux may be labelled simply as Pauillac.

== Food matching ==
The classic match is roast lamb; game can also work well. For very old vintages (pre-1959, but not the exceptional 1945) leg or rack of lamb would be best, or partridge or grouse. Otherwise, shoulder or saddle would be a good choice, or pheasant or hare. Rare rib or rump of beef can also be good.

== Châteaux ==
=== First growths ===
Château Latour, Château Lafite Rothschild, Château Mouton Rothschild

=== Second growths ===
Château Pichon-Longueville, Château Pichon-Longueville-Lalande

=== Fourth growth ===
Château Duhart-Milon

=== Fifth growths ===
Château Pontet-Canet, Château Batailley, Château Haut-Batailley, Château Grand-Puy-Lacoste, Château Grand-Puy-Ducasse, Château Lynch-Bages, Château Lynch-Moussas, Château d'Armailhac, Château Haut-Bages-Libéral, Château Pédesclaux, Château Clerc-Milon, Château Croizet Bages

=== Notable unclassed châteaux ===
Château La Couronne, Château Pibran, Château Haut-Bages-Averous, Château Haut-Bages Monpelou, Château Fonbadet
