= Château Ducru-Beaucaillou =

Winery in the Bordeaux region of France

Coordinates: 45.15096°N 0.73450°W

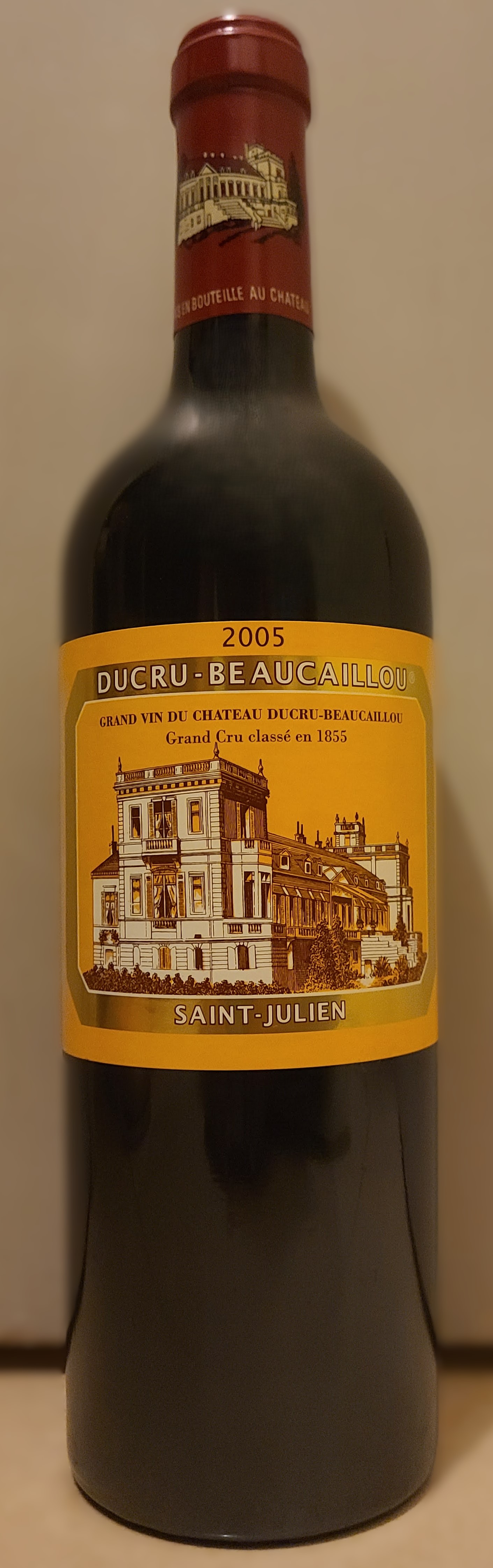
Grand Vin 2005

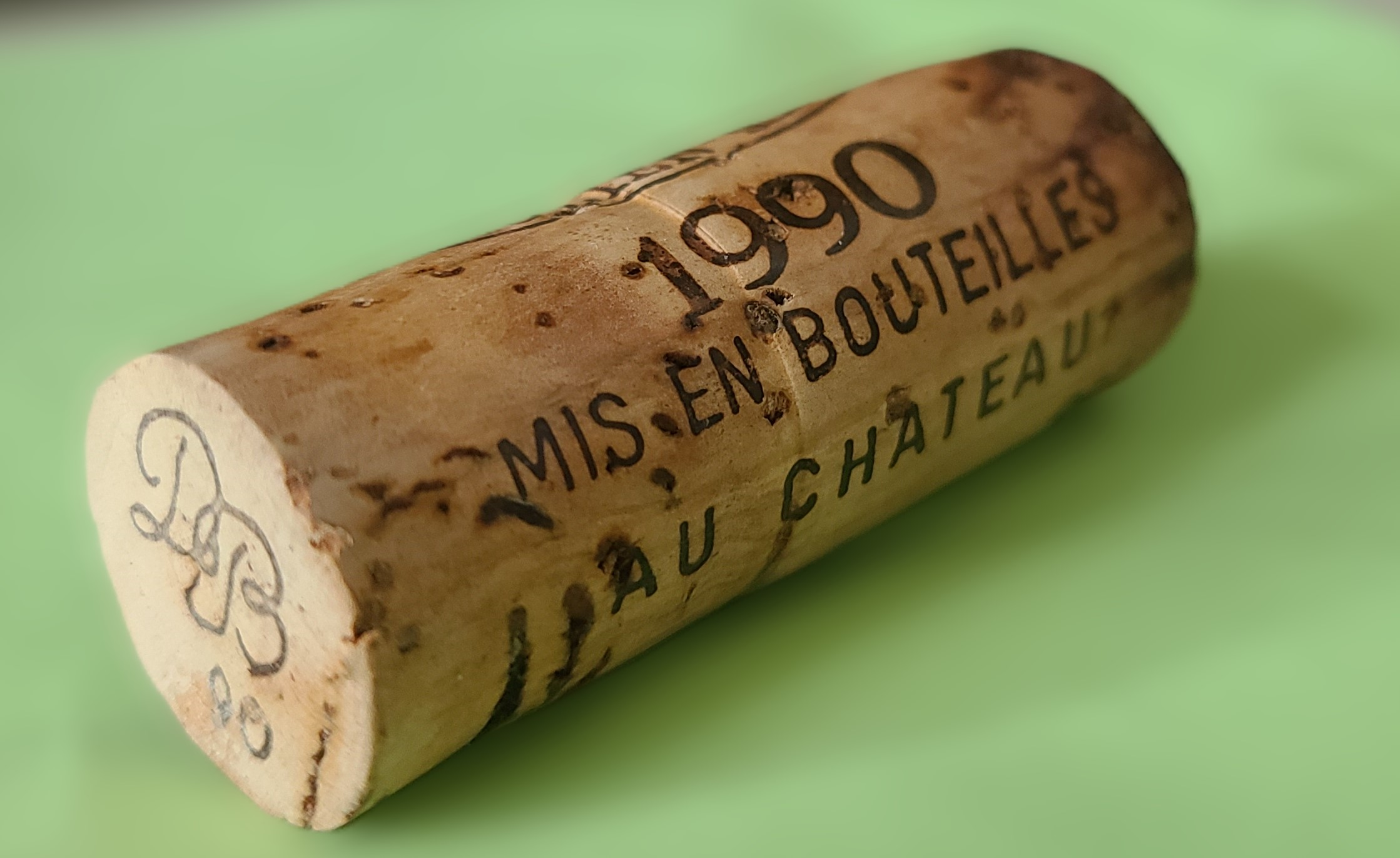
Cork

Château Ducru-Beaucaillou is a winery in the Saint-Julien appellation of the Bordeaux region of France. Château Ducru-Beaucaillou is also the name of the red wine produced by this property. The wine produced here was classified as one of fifteen Deuxièmes Crus (Second Growths) in the original Bordeaux Wine Official Classification of 1855.

== History ==
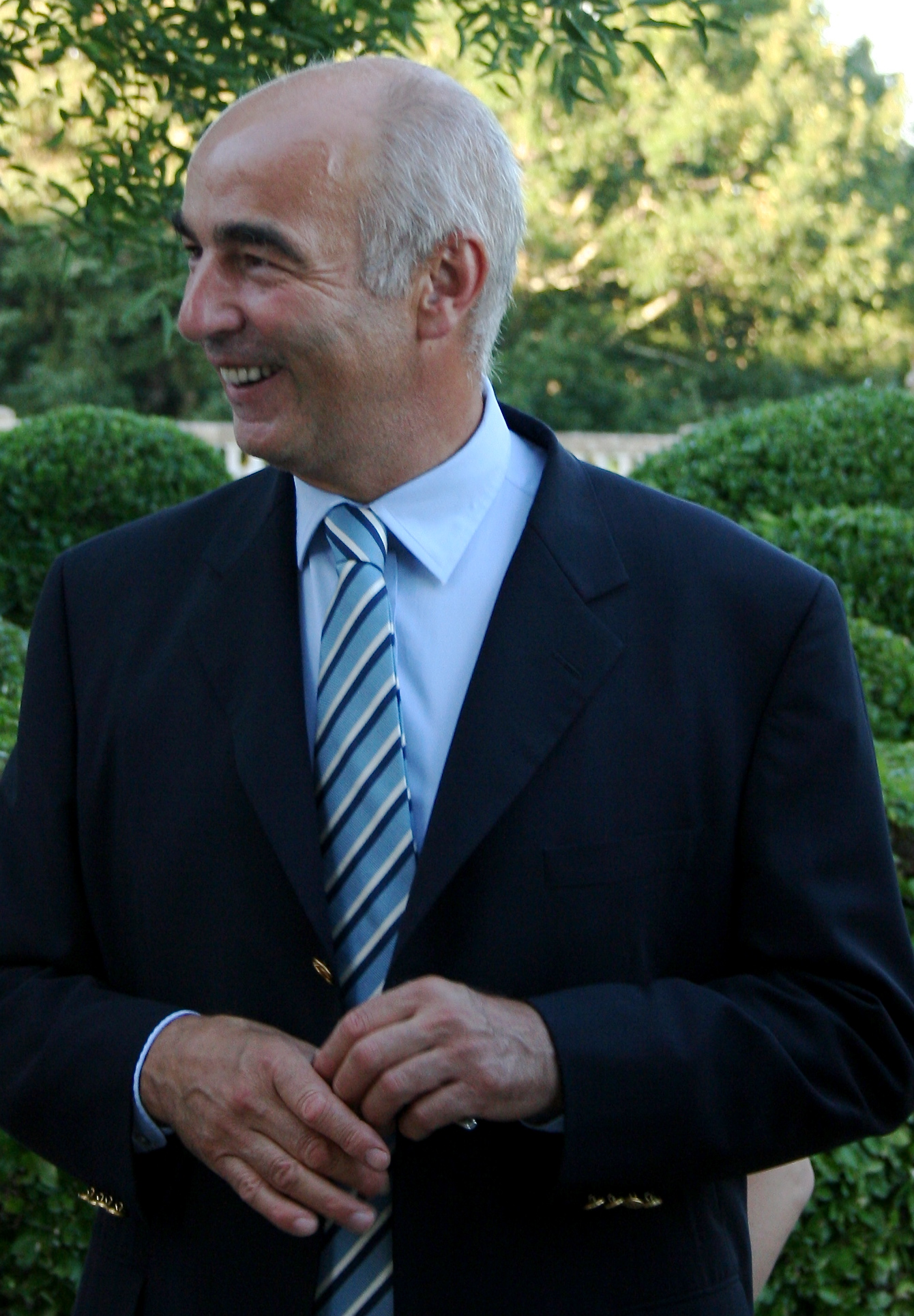
Bruno Borie

The estate Château Ducru-Beaucaillou was purchased by Francois Borie in 1941 and has remained in the family since then. The family also owns other estates, Château Grand-Puy-Lacoste and Château Haut-Batailley. In the mid-1980s the estate battled an infestation of TCA in their cellars that marred several vintages including the 1988, 1989, and 1990. The Chateau has since corrected the problem, and today the wines are fermented and aged in a new underground cellar created in the late 1990s. Today the estate is managed by Bruno Borie.

== Vineyard ==
Ducru-Beaucaillou's vineyards consist of 50 hectares of well-drained gravel with stones up to 2.5 inches in diameter. (beaucaillou means "beautiful stones".) The vineyards are planted in Cabernet Sauvignon (70%) and Merlot (30%); previous plantings of Cabernet Franc and Petit Verdot having been uprooted. The vines' average age in 2005 was 38 years.

== Wine ==
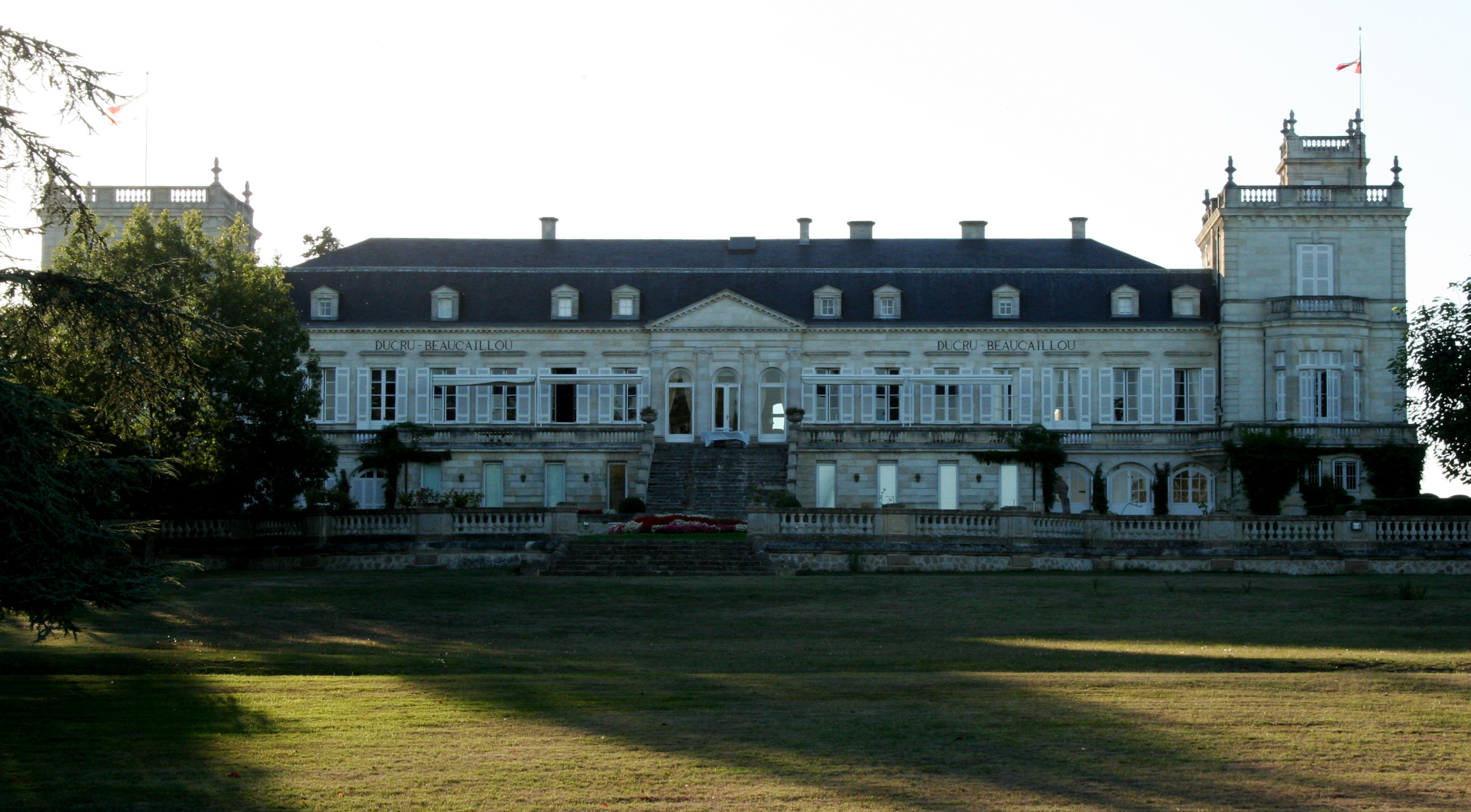
The château of Château Ducru-Beaucaillou

Ducru-Beaucaillou produces three wines. The grand vin, called Château Ducru-Beaucaillou; a second wine, La Croix de Beaucaillou, produced since 1995, to which lesser-quality lots are relegated; and a third wine, Le Petit Ducru de Ducru-Beaucaillou, produced since 2019, comprising the former Château Lalande-Borie. The wines are aged for 18 months in 50% to 80% new oak barrels according to the richness of the vintage, fined with egg whites, lightly filtered, and then bottled. Wine writer Jay McInerney wrote "Ducru has always been a wine of finesse rather than sheer brute power, a kind of Burgundian Bordeaux."

== See also ==
- French wine
- Bordeaux wine
