= Château Haut-Batailley =

Coordinates: 45.17681°N 0.77291°W

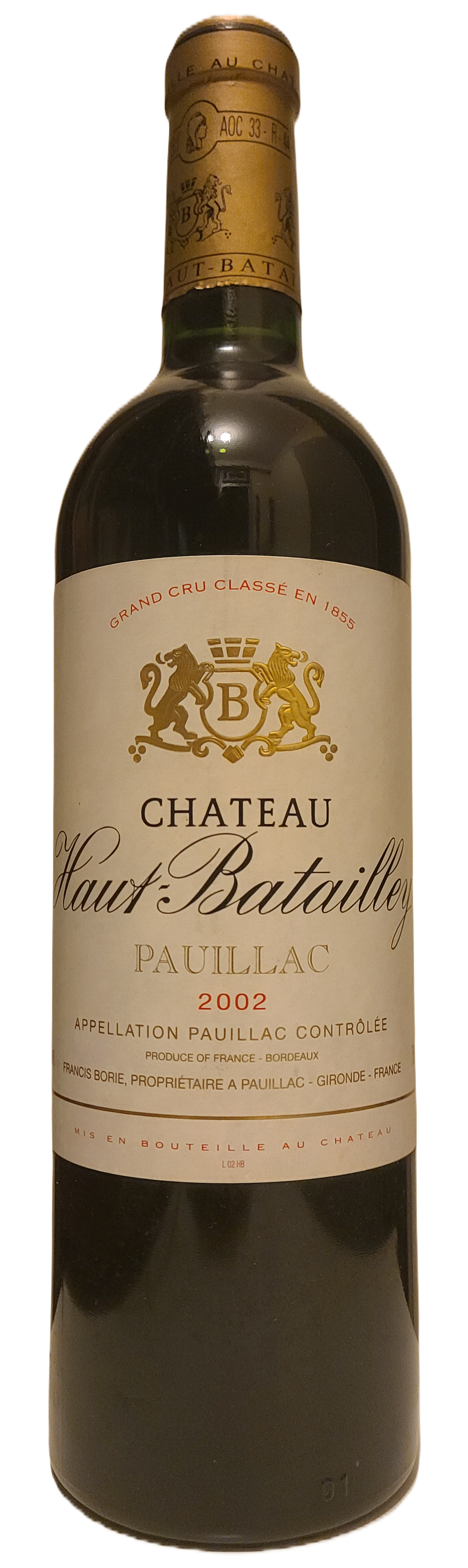
Grand Vin 2002

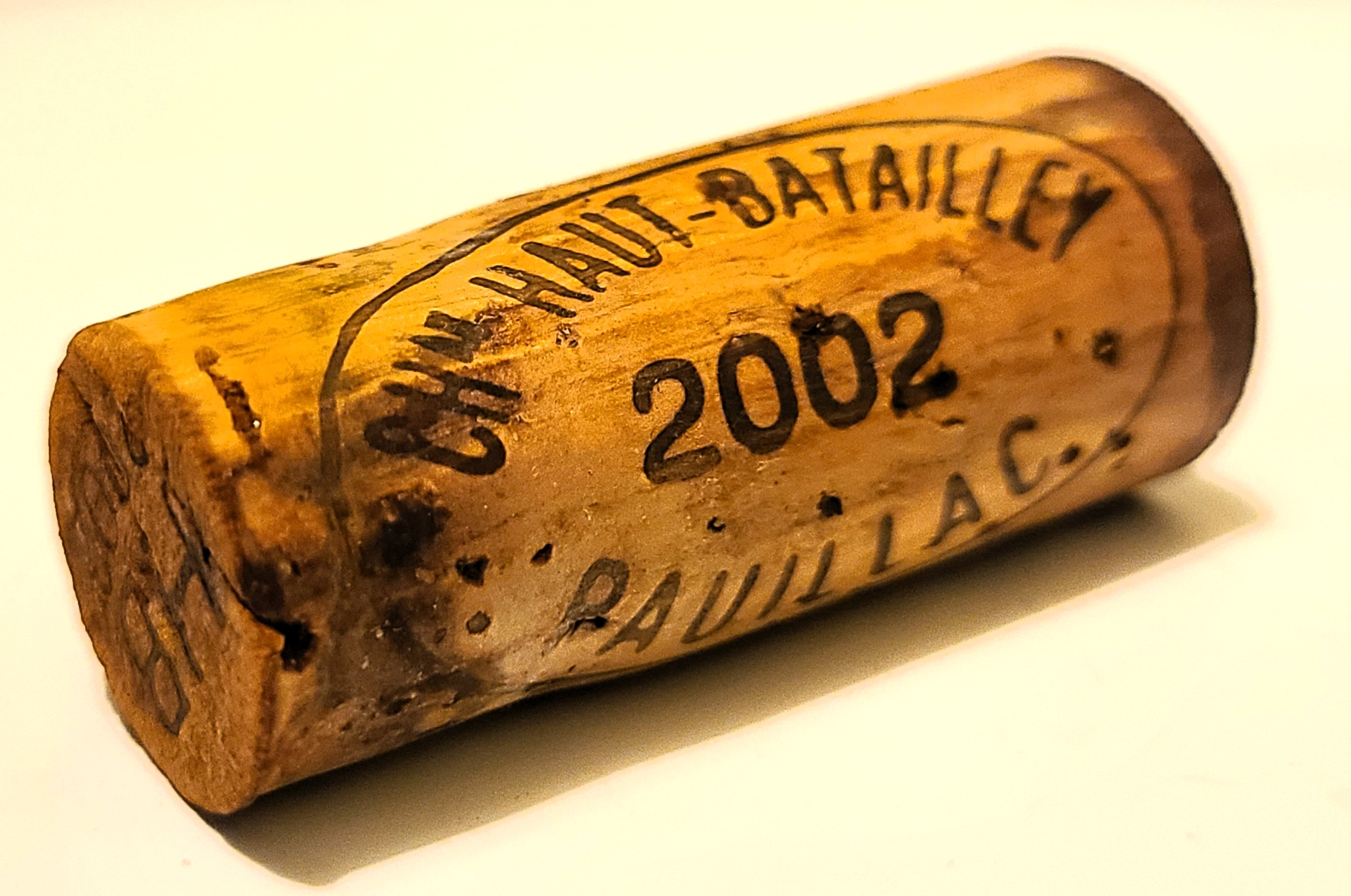
Cork

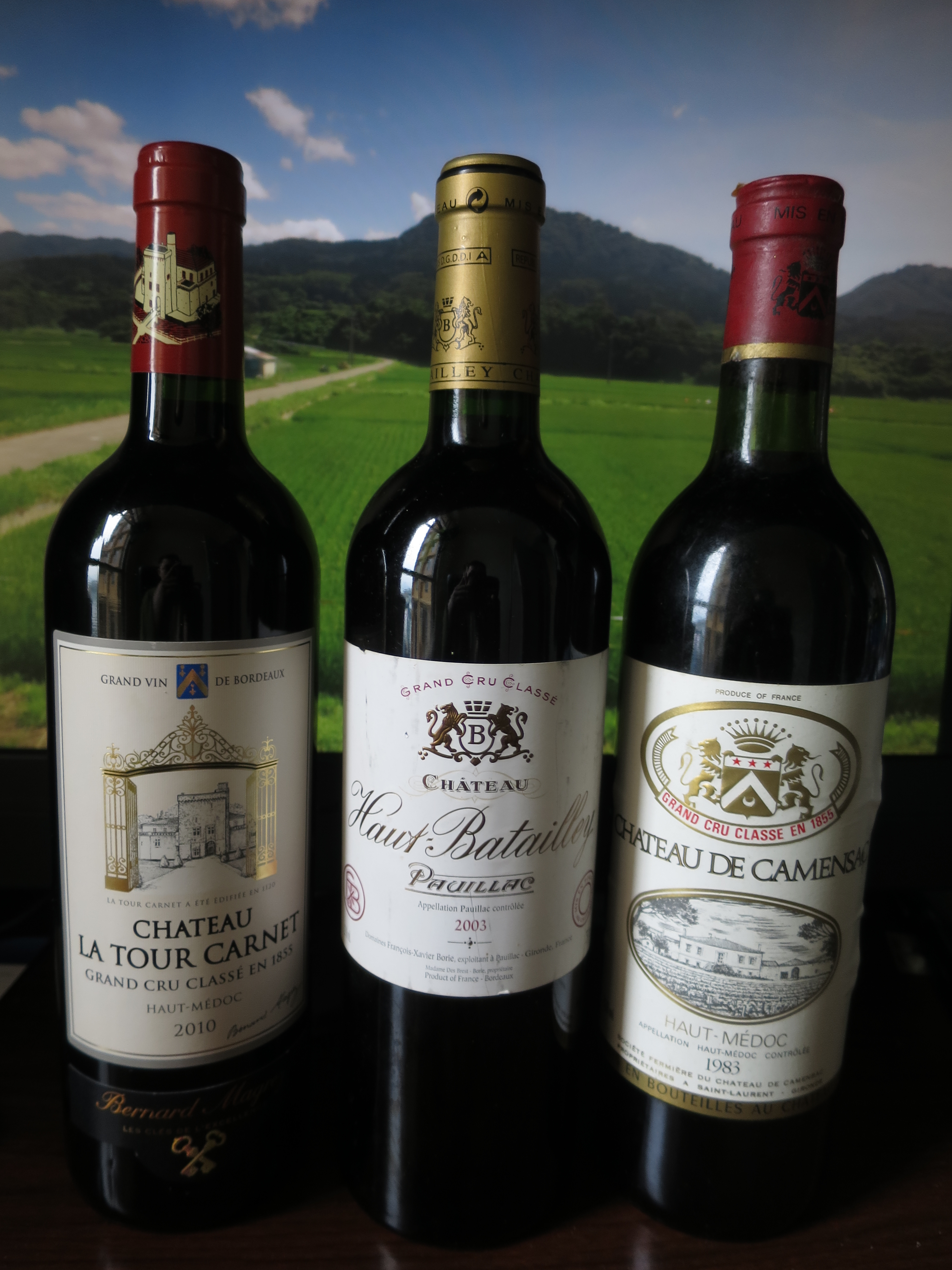
A bottle of Château Haut-Batailley 2003 in the center

Château Haut-Batailley (French pronunciation: [ʃato o batajɛ]) is a winery in the Pauillac appellation of the Bordeaux region of France. The wine produced here was part of the property that was classified as one of eighteen Cinquièmes Crus (Fifth Growths) in the Bordeaux Wine Official Classification of 1855.

== History ==
Historically the estate was part of Château Batailley until its purchase by the brothers François and Marcel Borie in 1932, and division into two properties 1942, in order to prevent inheritance difficulties. The smaller part which did not include the Batailley château became the property of François Borie who added to its vineyards with land acquisitions from Château Duhart-Milon while also running Château Ducru-Beaucaillou. Following his death in 1953, the property passed on to his daughter Françoise de Brest-Borie, while being administered by her brother and Ducru-Beaucaillou owner Jean-Eugène Borie.

In 2017, the Cazes family of Château Lynch-Bages acquired the Château Haut-Batailley estate.

The Borie family also own Château Ducru-Beaucaillou and Château Grand-Puy-Lacoste.

== Production ==
The vineyard area extends 22 hectares (54 acres) planted with 65% Cabernet Sauvignon, 25% Merlot, and 10% Cabernet Franc.

Of the grand vin Chateau Haut-Batailley, there is an average annual production of 10,000 cases (900 hl), and of the second wine Tour d'Aspic there is an annual production of 1,700 cases (150 hl).
