= Pauillac =

- Commune
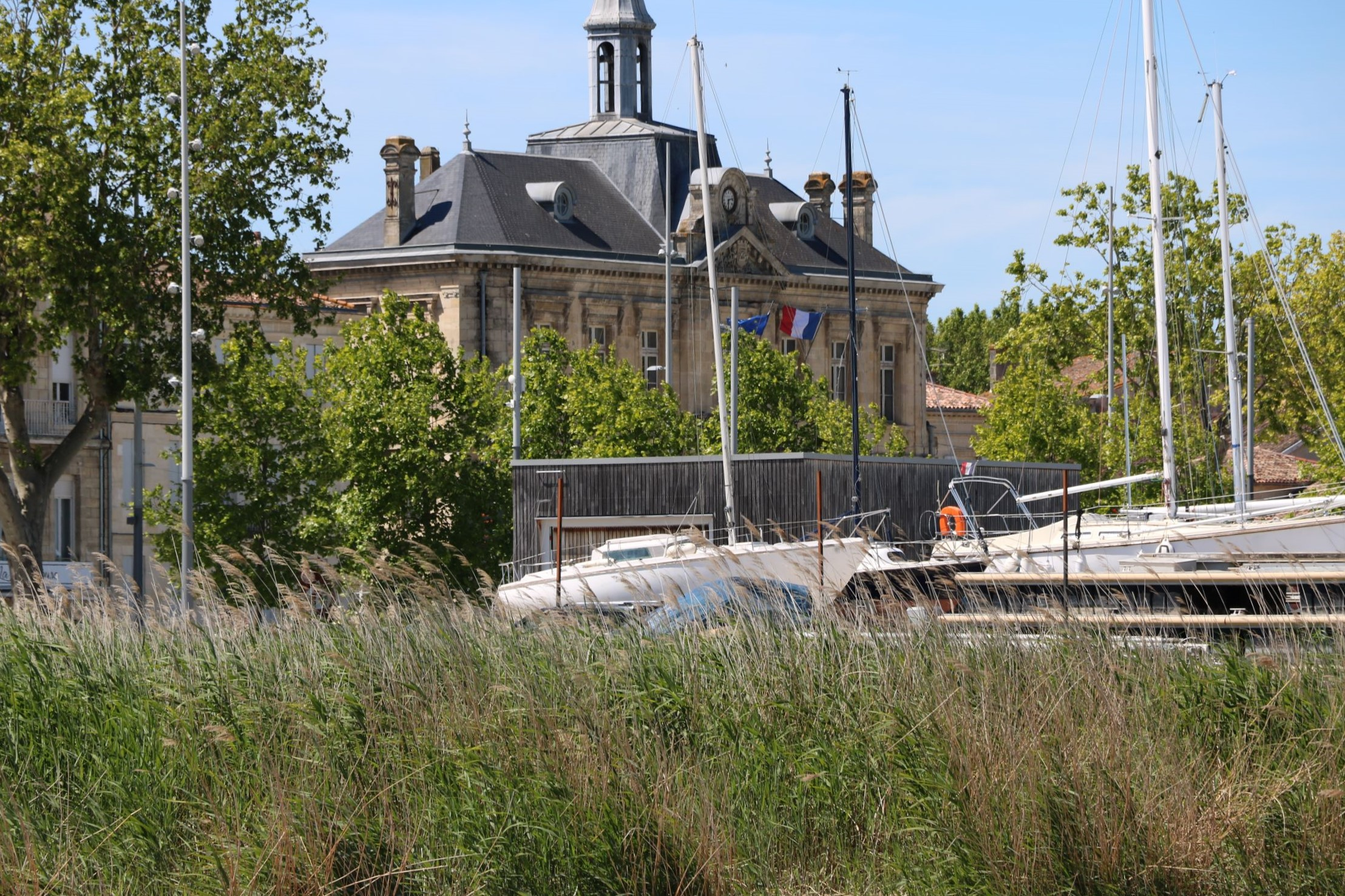
- Pauillac City Hall and reed bed on the Gironde

- Coat of arms
- Location of Pauillac
- Location within France Location within Nouvelle-Aquitaine
- Coordinates: 45°12′00″N 0°44′56″W
- Country: France
- Region: Nouvelle-Aquitaine
- Department: Gironde
- Arrondissement: Lesparre-Médoc
- Canton: Le Nord-Médoc

Government
  - Mayor (2020–2026): Florent Fatin
- Area^{1}: 22.74 km^{2} (8.78 sq mi)
- Elevation: 6 m (20 ft)
- Highest elevation: 29 m (95 ft)
- Lowest elevation: 0 m (0 ft)
- Population (2023): 5,190
  - Density: 228/km^{2} (591/sq mi)
- Time zone: UTC+01:00 (CET)
  - Summer (DST): UTC+02:00 (CEST)
- INSEE/Postal code: 33314 /33250
- ^{1} French Land Register data, which excludes lakes, ponds, glaciers > 1 km^{2} (0.386 sq mi or 247 acres) and river estuaries.

Pauillac (French pronunciation: [pojak]; Occitan: Paulhac) is a municipality in the Gironde department in Nouvelle-Aquitaine in southwestern France. The city is mid-way between Bordeaux and the Pointe de Grave, along the Gironde, the largest estuary in western Europe.

== Population ==
Historical population
Year	Pop.	±% p.a.
1968	5,640	—
1975	6,363	+1.74%
1982	6,145	−0.50%
1990	5,670	−1.00%
1999	5,175	−1.01%
2007	5,265	+0.22%
2012	5,024	−0.93%
2017	4,841	−0.74%
2023	5,190	+1.17%
Source: INSEE

== Access ==
The town is situated on the famous "Route des châteaux" or road "D2" which runs through the centre of the prestigious wine appellations. It stretches from Blanquefort in the South (close to Bordeaux) to the northern tip of the Médoc.

The Pauillac railway station stands on the line from Bordeaux-Ravezies to the Pointe de Grave. It is served by the TER Nouvelle-Aquitaine regional rail network and operated by the French national railway company SNCF.

== Ports ==
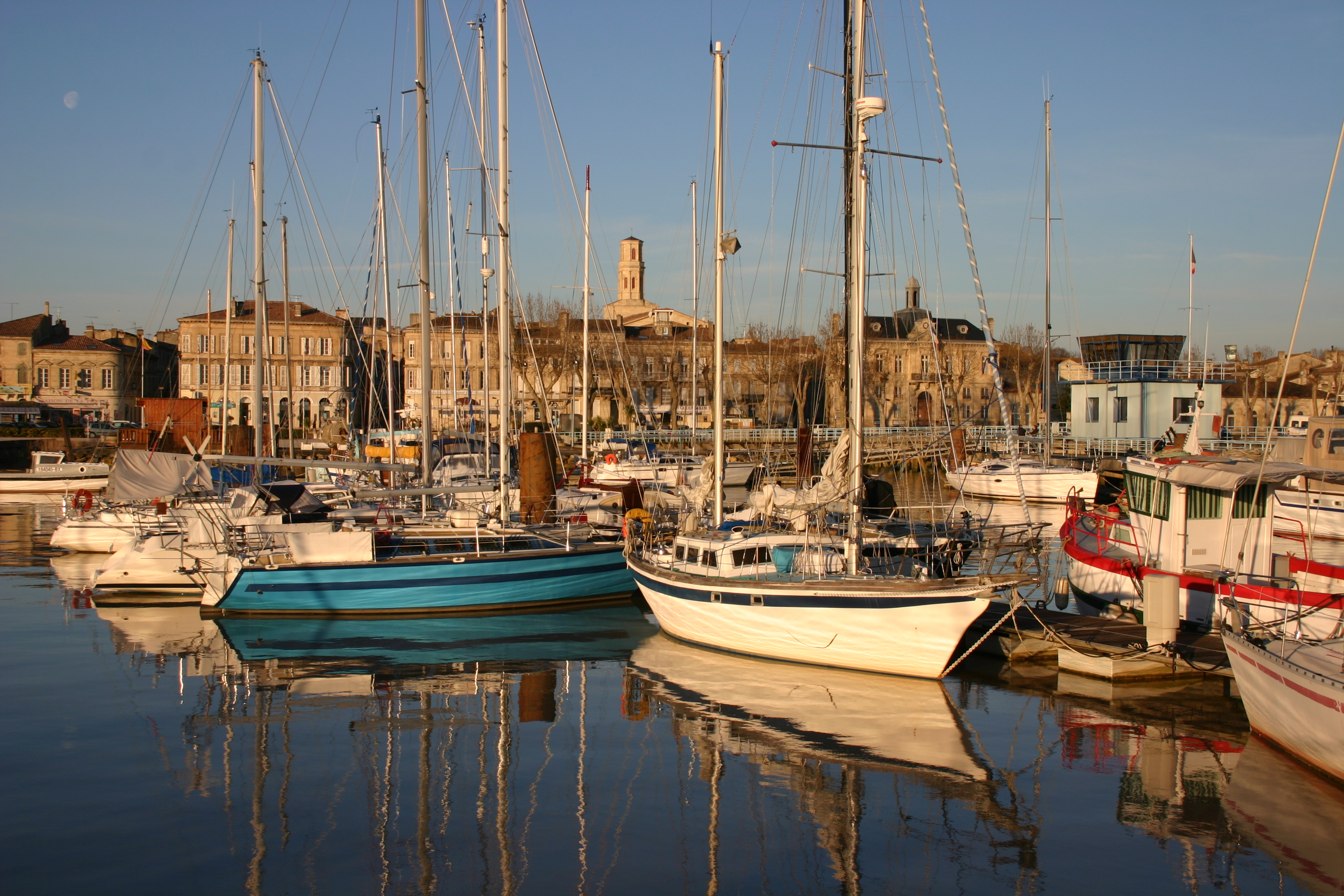
Marina of Pauillac

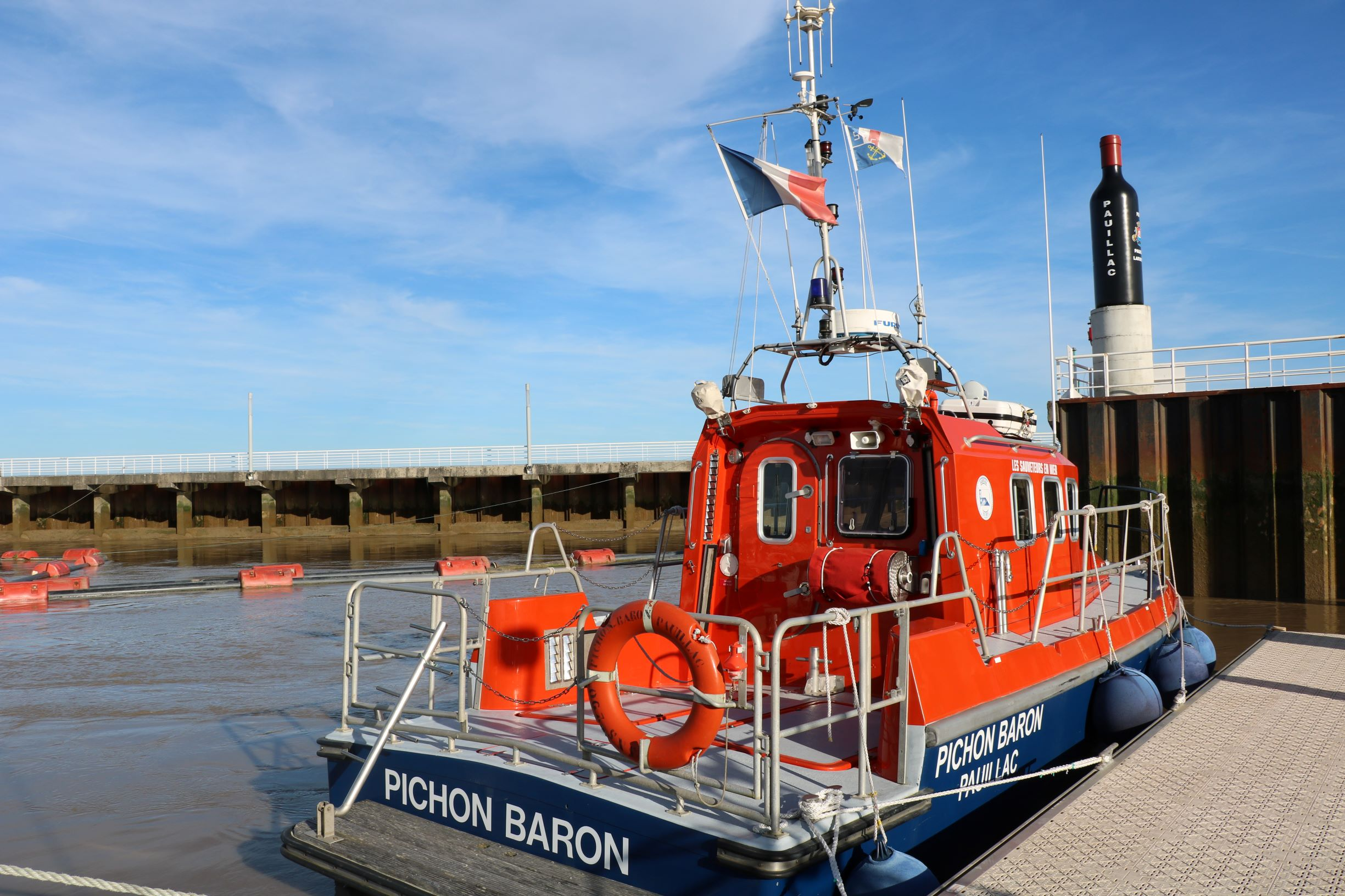
Lifeboat Pichon Baron from the SNSM next to a giant bottle of wine at the marina entrance channel

In 1872, one of the first sailing clubs in France, still active today, was created in Pauillac, followed by the International UCPA sailing school.

In 1896, the French Line Compagnie Générale Transatlantique built a terminal at Pauillac, Trompeloup, on which four cruise ships could dock at a time. A direct connection allowed passengers to join the railway line running between Bordeaux and Soulac. Many companies used this Port for their cruise ships crossing the Atlantic to South America and the Antilles until the mid-20th century.

After WWII, the Port was converted into a petroleum terminal and today it is a transfer point for plane parts of the Airbus A380. The parts are manufactured in Broughton in the UK, and Germany. The barges take them through Bordeaux to a dock at Langon and then by oversize road convoy to the assembly plant at Blagnac, Toulouse.

A new cruise terminal, the "Terminal Médoc", will be built in Trompeloup and should be operational in 2021, allowing cruise ships carrying up to 6,000 passengers. The marina La Fayette was built in 1977 2,300 m (7,500 ft) south of this. It has a fisherman pontoon and moorings for about 150 boats. Many services are available including masting and demasting. Sailors and boaters may have to wait for a couple of hours before entering or leaving the port due to the tide and its high coefficients. A closed and secured area with video surveillance is available for long term parking of boats and trailers. The marina is also home to the lifeboat Pichon Baron from the Société Nationale de Sauvetage en Mer (SNSM), a French voluntary organisation founded in 1967 to save lives at sea around the French coast, "so that salt water never taste of tears."

== History ==
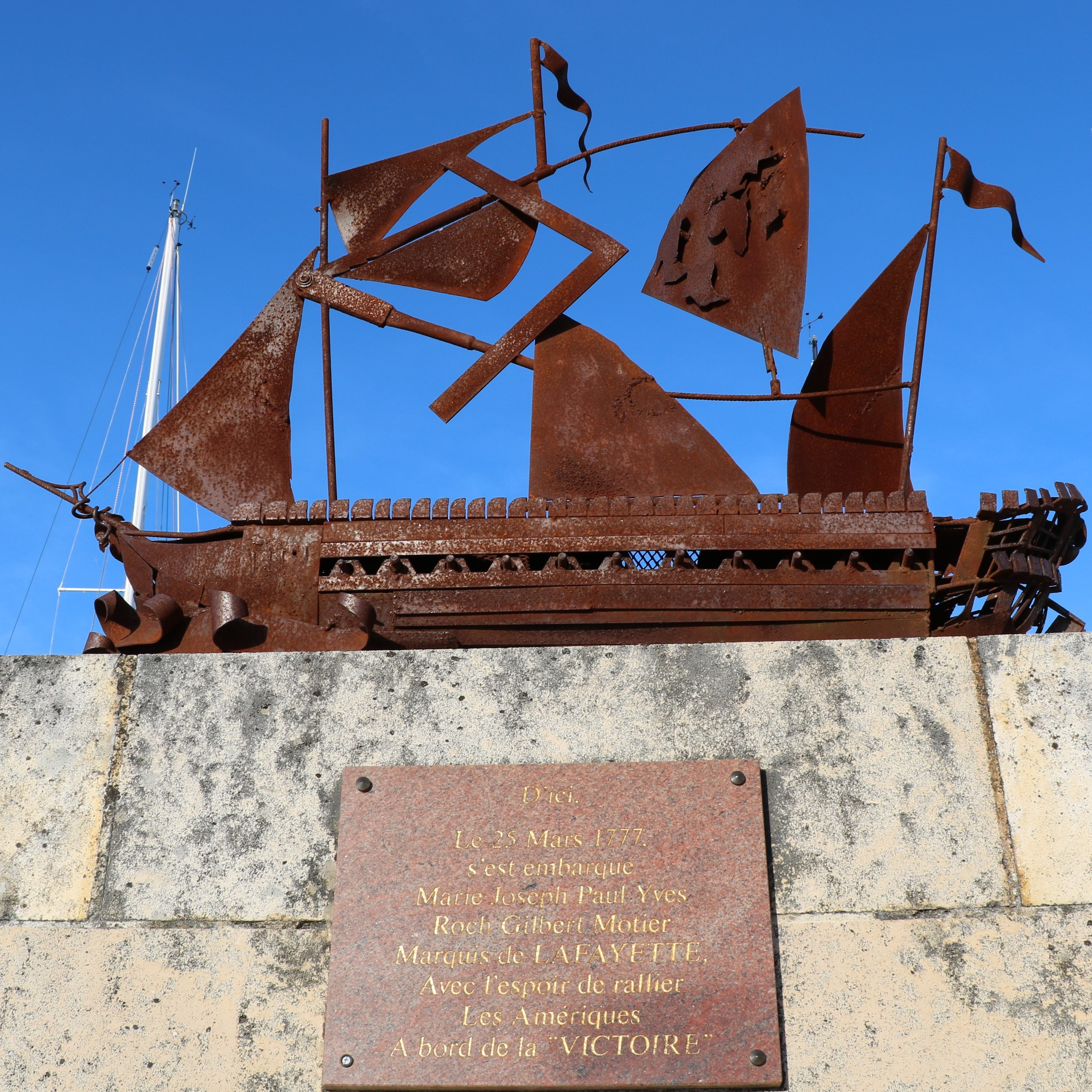
Plaza La Fayette

In 1777, Lafayette, a French aristocrat and military officer, arrived in Bordeaux and set sail from Pauillac to America. There, his role was decisive in the American War of Independence, commanding American troops in several battles, including the Siege of Yorktown. To commemorate his legacy, a bronze stele representing his ship La Victoire is erected on the edge of the marina on the Plaza La Fayette. On the stele can be read in French: "From here on March 25, 1777, embarked Marie Joseph Paul Yves Gilbert Motier, Marquis de Lafayette, with the hope of joining the Americas." After returning to France, he was a key figure in the French Revolution of 1789 and the July Revolution of 1830, also known as the Second French Revolution.

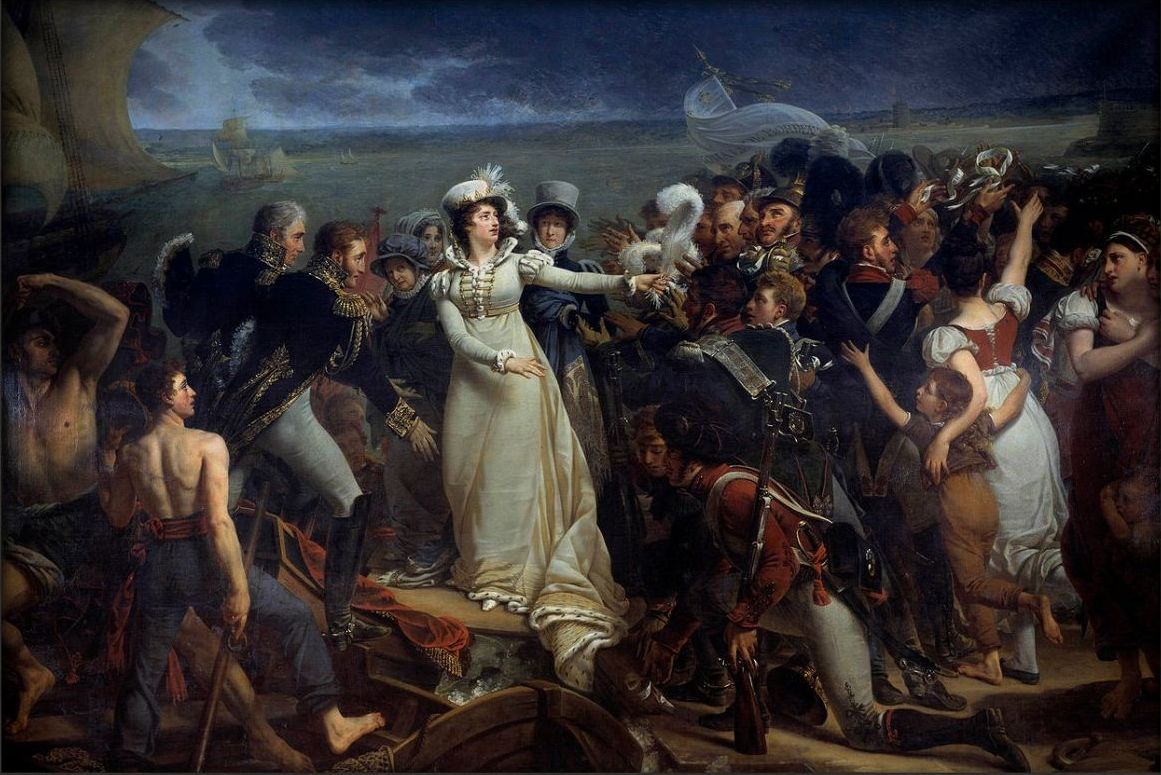
The Embarkation of the Duchess of Angoulême at Pauillac by Antoine-Jean Gros, 1818

In April 1815, after trying to rally Royalist forces against Napoleon during the Hundred Days, the Duchess of Angoulême embarked for exile at Pauillac.

In December 1917, the United States Navy established a naval air station to operate seaplanes during World War I. The base closed shortly after the First Armistice at Compiègne.

In May 1940, an interim occupation authority was established by Nazi Germany in France's so-called zone occupée, so that Pauillac was occupied like most parts of the western half of Aquitaine along the Atlantic coast.

== Main sights ==
The town is known for its vineyards, which produce wines associated with the Bordeaux region. The Tourist Office and Wine House (French: Maison du Tourisme et du Vin) provides information about local wine production and related activities. Its facilities include wine tastings, video screenings, wine sales, and seminars.

Some castles offer art exhibitions (Château Pédesclaux for example) or a museum (Mouton Rothschild castle and its museum of wine in Art).

The Village de Bages, a small renovated village next to the Château Lynch-Bages, is dedicated to the wines and tastes of the Pauillac region. It offers a bistro, fine bakery and grocery store, shops and bike workshop arranged around the central square. Cellar tours but also many events are held throughout the year. Cruises operate from the port of Pauillac along the estuary of the Gironde.

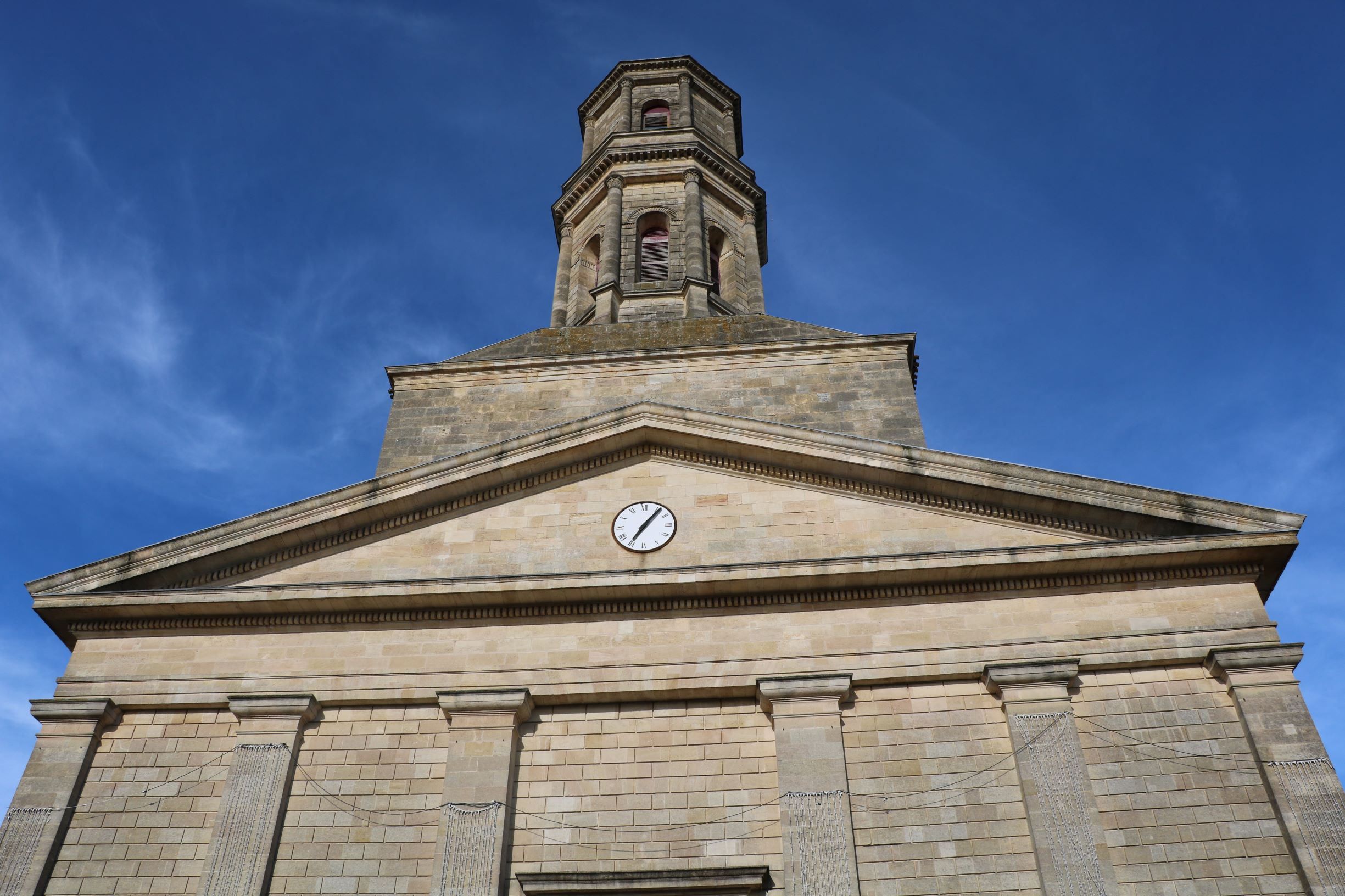
Western facade of the Saint Martin's church, on Marshal Joffre Square

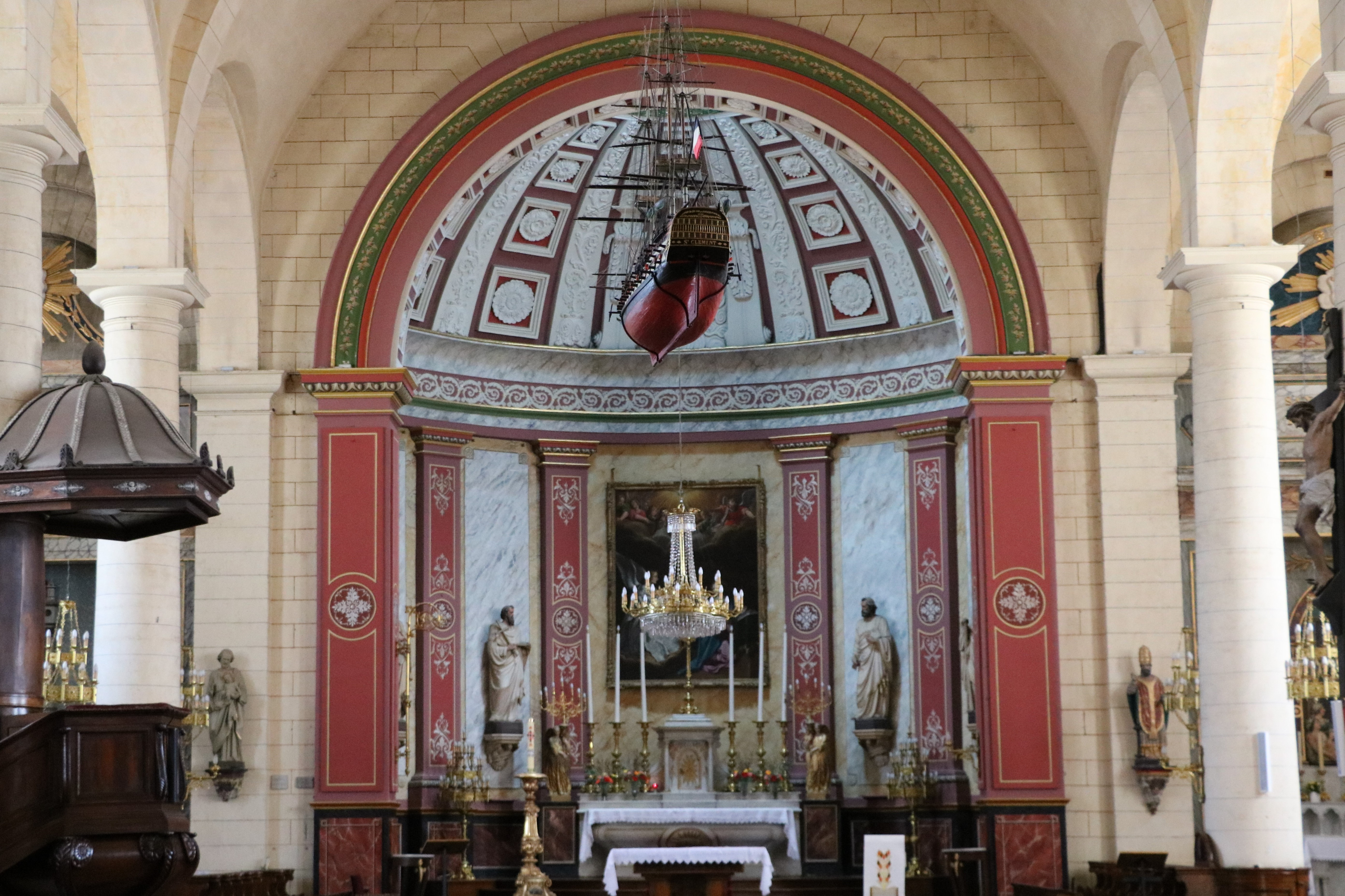
The choir of Saint-Martin's church, covered by a semi-dome

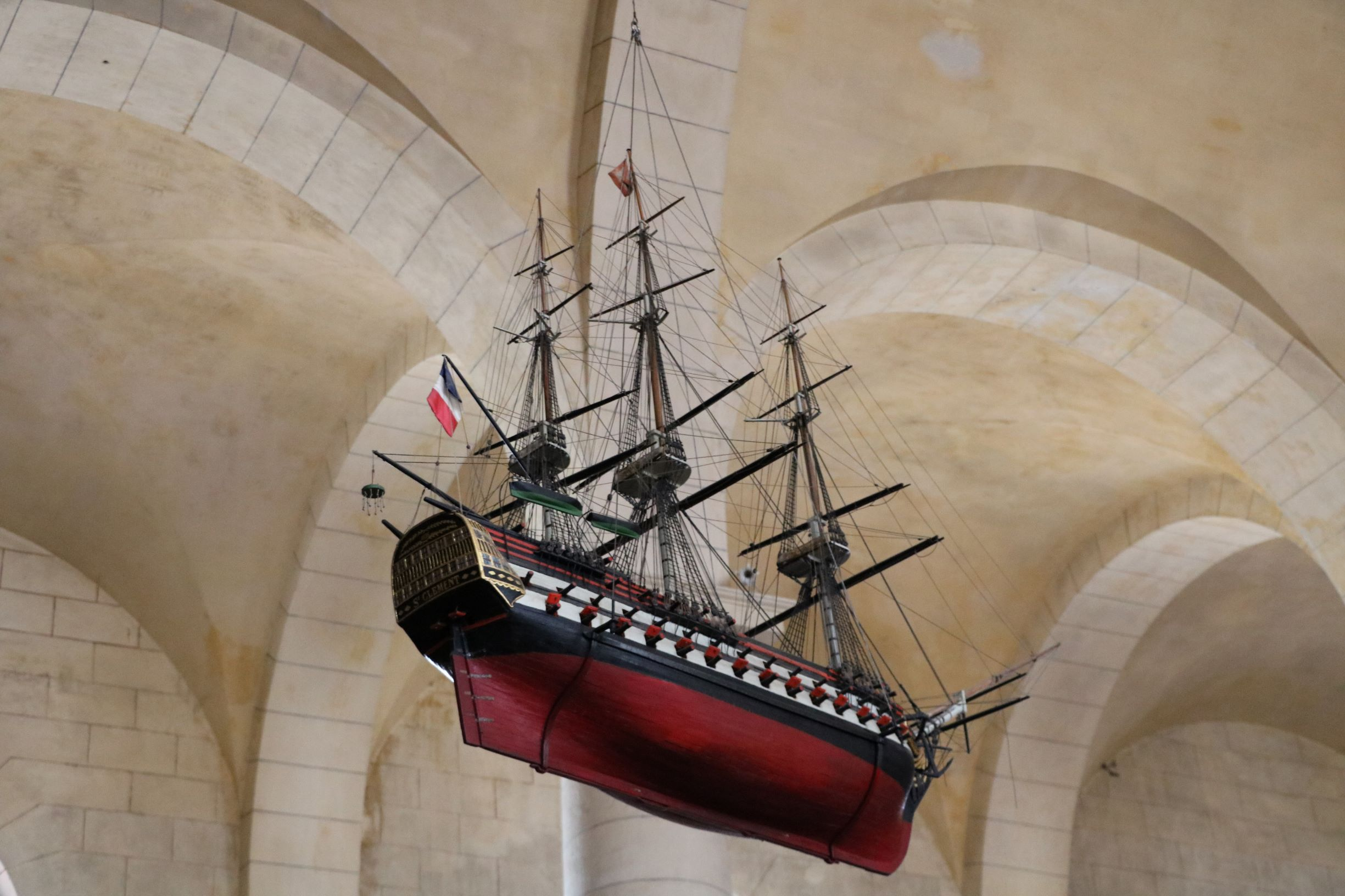
The warship Saint Clement, an ex-voto hanging in Saint-Martin's church

The Saint Martin's church is situated in the heart of Pauillac on Marshal Joffre Square. In November 1824 were laid the foundations before it would be delivered to worship in May 1828 and completed in 1829. The church was partly built out of the materials from the former church which had become too small. The Bordeaux architect Armand Corcelles was inspired by Greek art. The western façade is topped by a huge pediment which supports an octagonal tower made of two superimposed towers. The first tower houses three bells. Two of them date from 1784 and come from a former church. The third bell, cracked by too brisk and cheerful ringing during the Liberation in 1945, was melted again, baptized and named Edouard-Jeanne-Victoire in 1946. Inside, the nave has eight doric columns. In the choir, the white marble baroque style main altar is covered by a semi-dome. A canopy just above the altar lights it perfectly. An oculus, on a baroque piece of sculpture background, illuminated by the rising sun, represents the triangle of the Divine Trinity. This church also has an ex-voto: a small replication of the warship Saint Clement, hanging from the vault in the centre of the nave. It was offered in 1836 by the pilots and coastal pilots of Pauillac: "To honor the memory of Pope Saint Clement, the patron saint of Pauillac naval station sailors, pilots, coastal pilots and aspirants, all Catholics." The model was restored in 1996. The back of the church is occupied by a large organ loft supported on iron columns. It consists of fifteen stops and was made of wood from Onega, Russia, and northern oak for the organ facade. On the left side of the nave is a wooden pulpit built right up against a pillar surrounded by a double spiral staircase. Facing the pulpit is a Christ on the Cross. On the three walls around the church is a Way of the Cross, fourteen paintings that reproduce the Passion of Christ.

== Sponsoring and twin cities ==
Pauillac is the sponsor city of the schooner "Belle Poule", training ship of the French Navy and the Medoc Squadron of Air Force Base 106.

Pauillac is twinned with the city of Pullach in Bavaria (Germany) and Paulhac in Haute-Garonne (France).

== Events and festivities ==
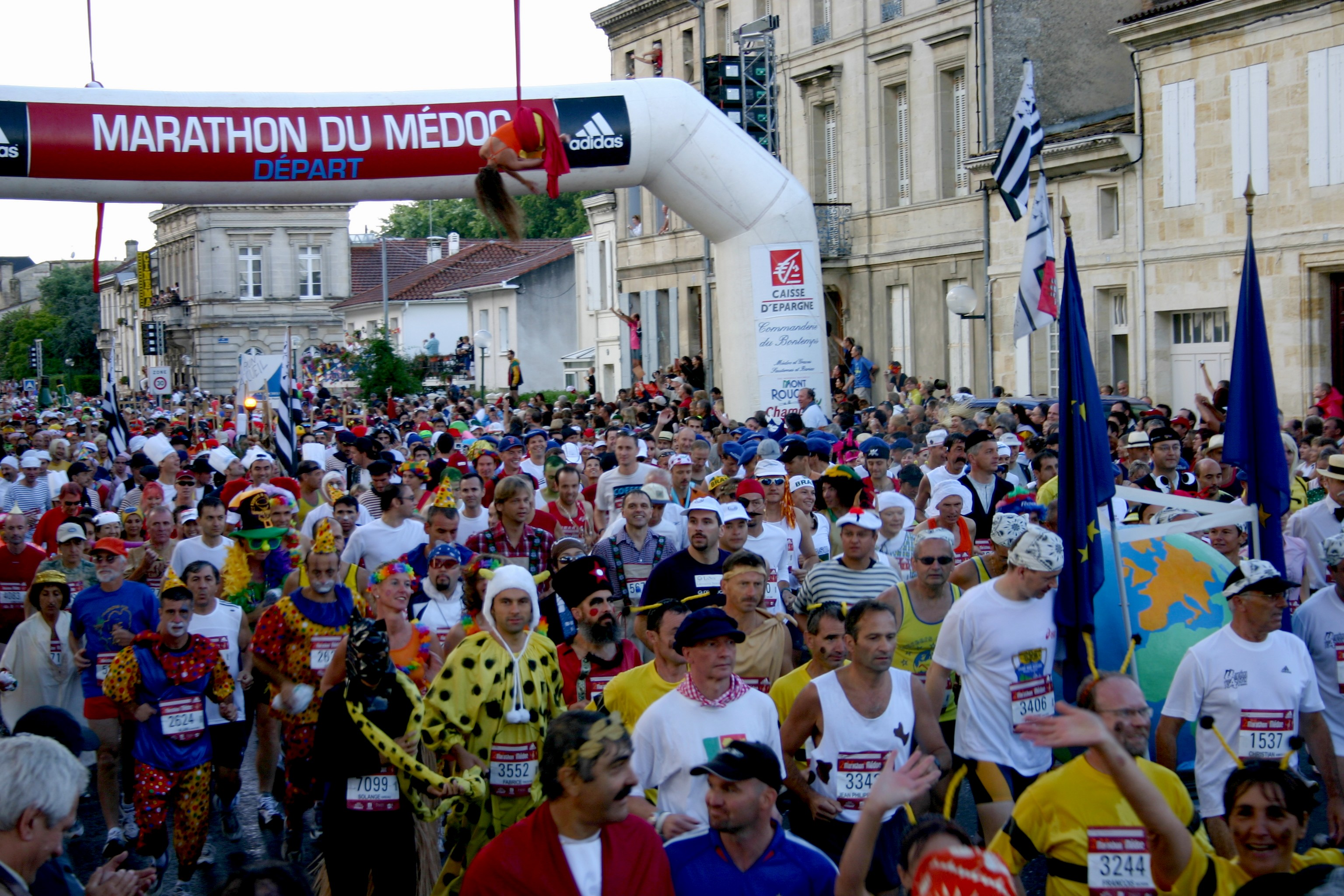
Marathon runners in Pauillac

- The Spring in the Castles (Printemps des Châteaux) takes place in April. Visits and wine tastings.
- The lamb festival takes place in June. Garage sales, gastronomic market and Pentecost regattas.
- The international film festival "Les Vendanges du 7ème Art" takes place in July.
- Every Tuesday and Thursday from mid-July to the end of August, a meeting with twenty winemakers is organized at the Tourist Office and Wine House.
- Every day from July to the end of August, a winemaker offers a free tasting at the Tourist Office and Wine House.
- Music and Cook and Wine takes place in August in front of the estuary in the Tourist Office and Wine House's gardens. Free concerts, free tastings with local winemakers and a food market with regional specialities.
- The Marathon du Médoc takes place in September. It is considered "the longest Marathon in the world" because the race is interspersed with several activities such as wine tasting stops and orchestras scattered around the course. Most of the 8,500 participants, representing more than 50 nations, run in costume.

== Reed beds ==
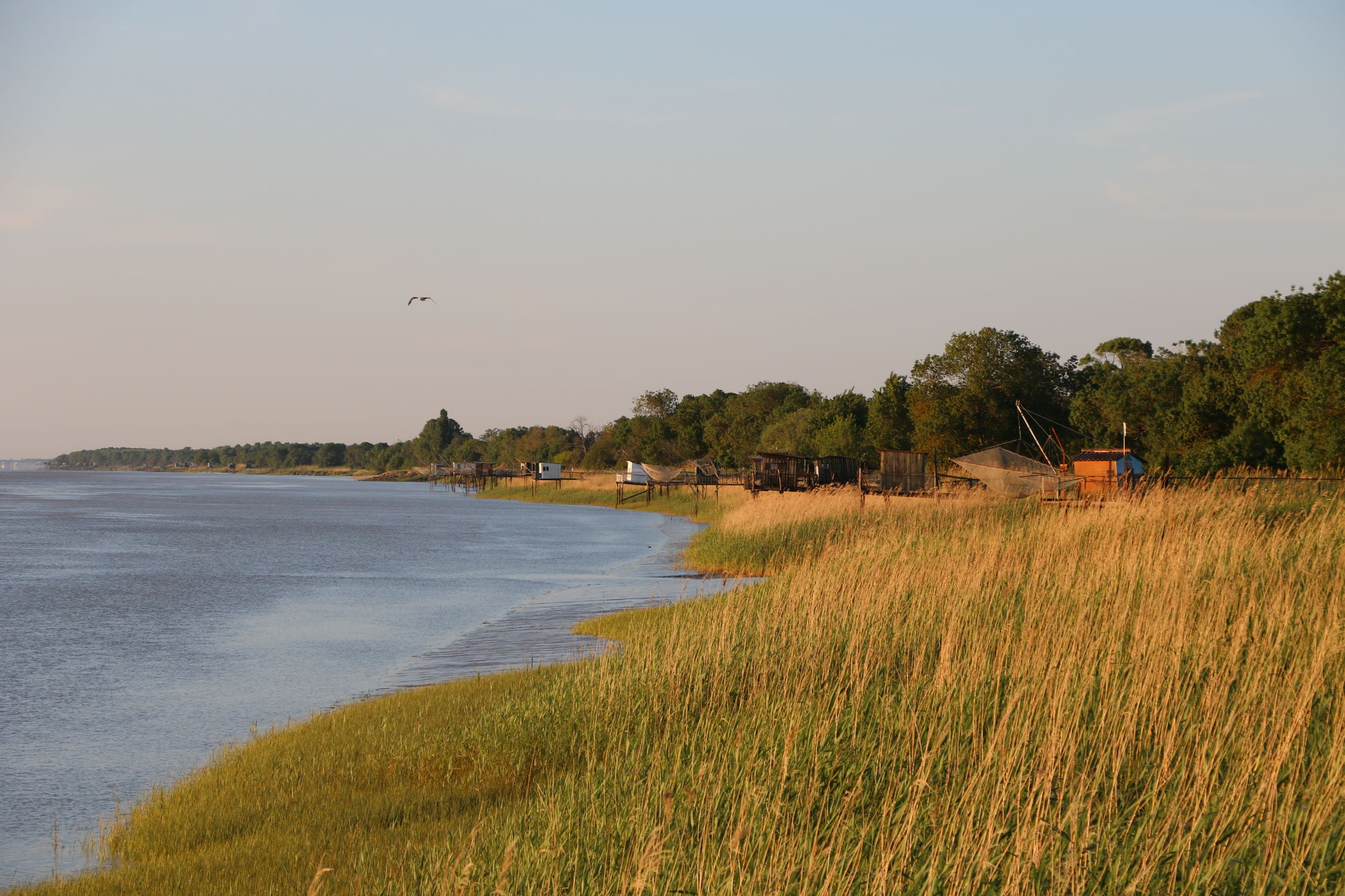
Reed bed in Pauillac

Extending over several kilometres alongside the estuary, reed beds have flourished and constitute a natural habitat for many plant and animal species. In the more urbanized areas in Pauillac, the reed beds are mown once a year to allow local inhabitants to enjoy the view over the estuary. The mowing period is chosen carefully so as to minimize disturbance of the natural biotope. Some of the reeds are protected by the Natura 2000 legislation. Since 2015, they are part of the Gironde estuary and Pertuis sea Marine Nature Park.

== Wine ==
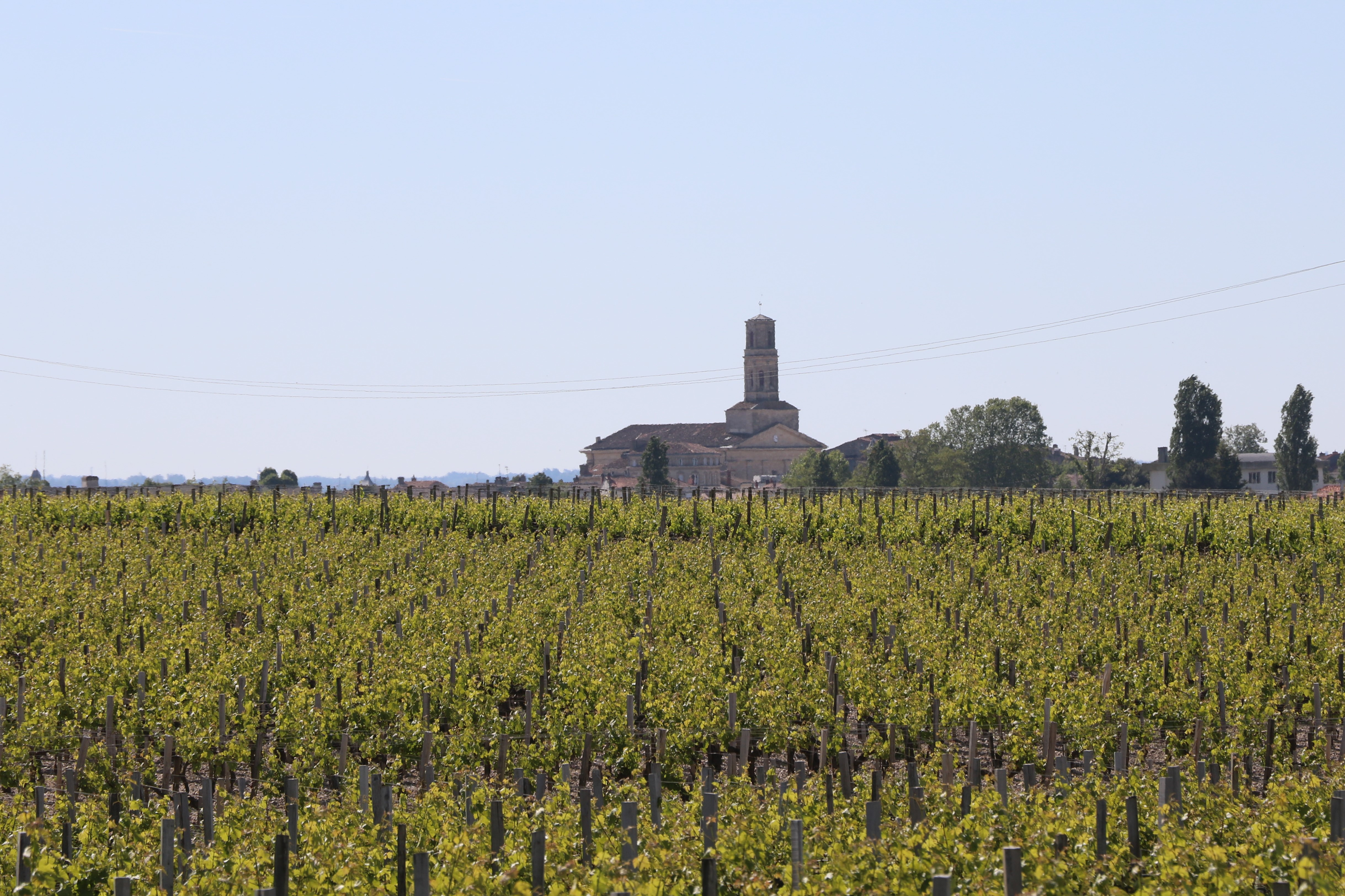
Vineyards of Pauillac

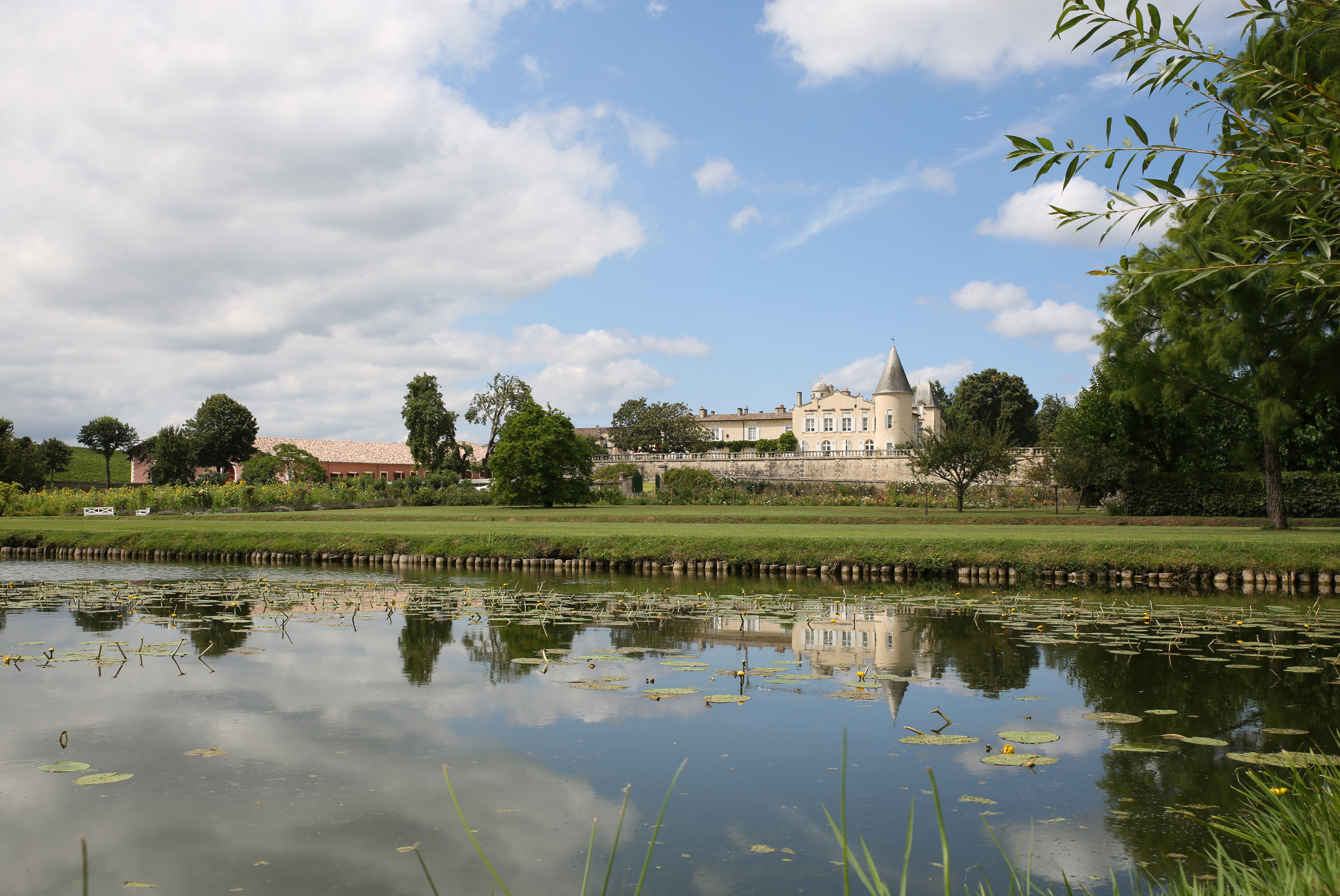
Château Lafite Rothschild, awarded First Growth status in the Bordeaux Wine Official Classification of 1855

The wines of Pauillac are often considered the quintessence of Bordeaux wines. British author and expert on wine Hugh Johnson has said, "If one had to single out one commune of Bordeaux to head the list, there would be no argument. It would be Pauillac."

The commune consists of only 3,000 acres (12 km^{2}) of vineyards in the Haut-Médoc between the villages of Saint-Julien to the south and Saint-Estèphe to the north, but is home to 18 Grands Crus Classés (classification of 1855) including three of Bordeaux's five first-growth wines: Château Lafite Rothschild, Château Latour, and Château Mouton Rothschild.

=== Selection of Pauillac estates ===
- Château d'Armailhac
- Château Clerc-Milon
- Château Duhart-Milon-Rothschild
- Château Grand-Puy-Ducasse
- Château Grand-Puy-Lacoste
- Château Haut-Bages-Liberal
- Château Haut-Batailley
- Château Lafite Rothschild
- Château Latour
- Château Lynch-Bages
- Château Mouton Rothschild
- Château Pedesclaux
- Château Pichon Longueville Baron
- Château Pichon Longueville Comtesse de Lalande
- Château Pontet-Canet

== Climate ==
Climate data for Pauillac (1991–2020 averages)
Month	Jan	Feb	Mar	Apr	May	Jun	Jul	Aug	Sep	Oct	Nov	Dec	Year
Record high °C (°F)	19.5 (67.1)	24.7 (76.5)	26.5 (79.7)	31.1 (88.0)	34.7 (94.5)	43.1 (109.6)	40.5 (104.9)	40.5 (104.9)	39.0 (102.2)	31.9 (89.4)	24.8 (76.6)	23.0 (73.4)	40.5 (104.9)
Mean daily maximum °C (°F)	10.1 (50.2)	11.5 (52.7)	15.0 (59.0)	17.8 (64.0)	21.5 (70.7)	24.7 (76.5)	26.7 (80.1)	27.0 (80.6)	23.9 (75.0)	19.3 (66.7)	13.9 (57.0)	10.7 (51.3)	18.5 (65.3)
Daily mean °C (°F)	7.1 (44.8)	7.6 (45.7)	10.5 (50.9)	12.9 (55.2)	16.4 (61.5)	19.5 (67.1)	21.2 (70.2)	21.3 (70.3)	18.5 (65.3)	14.9 (58.8)	10.3 (50.5)	7.6 (45.7)	14.0 (57.2)
Mean daily minimum °C (°F)	4.0 (39.2)	3.7 (38.7)	5.9 (42.6)	8.0 (46.4)	11.4 (52.5)	14.2 (57.6)	15.8 (60.4)	15.6 (60.1)	13.1 (55.6)	10.5 (50.9)	6.8 (44.2)	4.5 (40.1)	9.5 (49.1)
Record low °C (°F)	−16.0 (3.2)	−12.0 (10.4)	−9.0 (15.8)	−3.0 (26.6)	1.6 (34.9)	5.0 (41.0)	7.5 (45.5)	7.0 (44.6)	2.0 (35.6)	−1.5 (29.3)	−5.5 (22.1)	−9.5 (14.9)	−16.0 (3.2)
Average precipitation mm (inches)	87.3 (3.44)	60.2 (2.37)	56.7 (2.23)	67.4 (2.65)	61.0 (2.40)	59.2 (2.33)	42.0 (1.65)	53.7 (2.11)	70.0 (2.76)	88.2 (3.47)	110.9 (4.37)	100.4 (3.95)	857.0 (33.74)
Average precipitation days (≥ 1.0 mm)	11.9	9.8	10.4	10.3	9.7	7.9	6.8	7.3	8.8	11.6	13.9	13.2	121.6
Mean monthly sunshine hours	83.9	126.2	170.9	204.5	232.2	251.1	272.7	254.7	223.3	158.2	106.0	91.6	2,175.2
Source: Meteociel

== See also ==
- French wine
- Bordeaux wine
- Bordeaux wine regions
- Communes of the Gironde department
