= Gironde estuary and Pertuis sea Marine Nature Park =

- French: Parc naturel marin de l'estuaire de la Gironde et de la mer des Pertuis
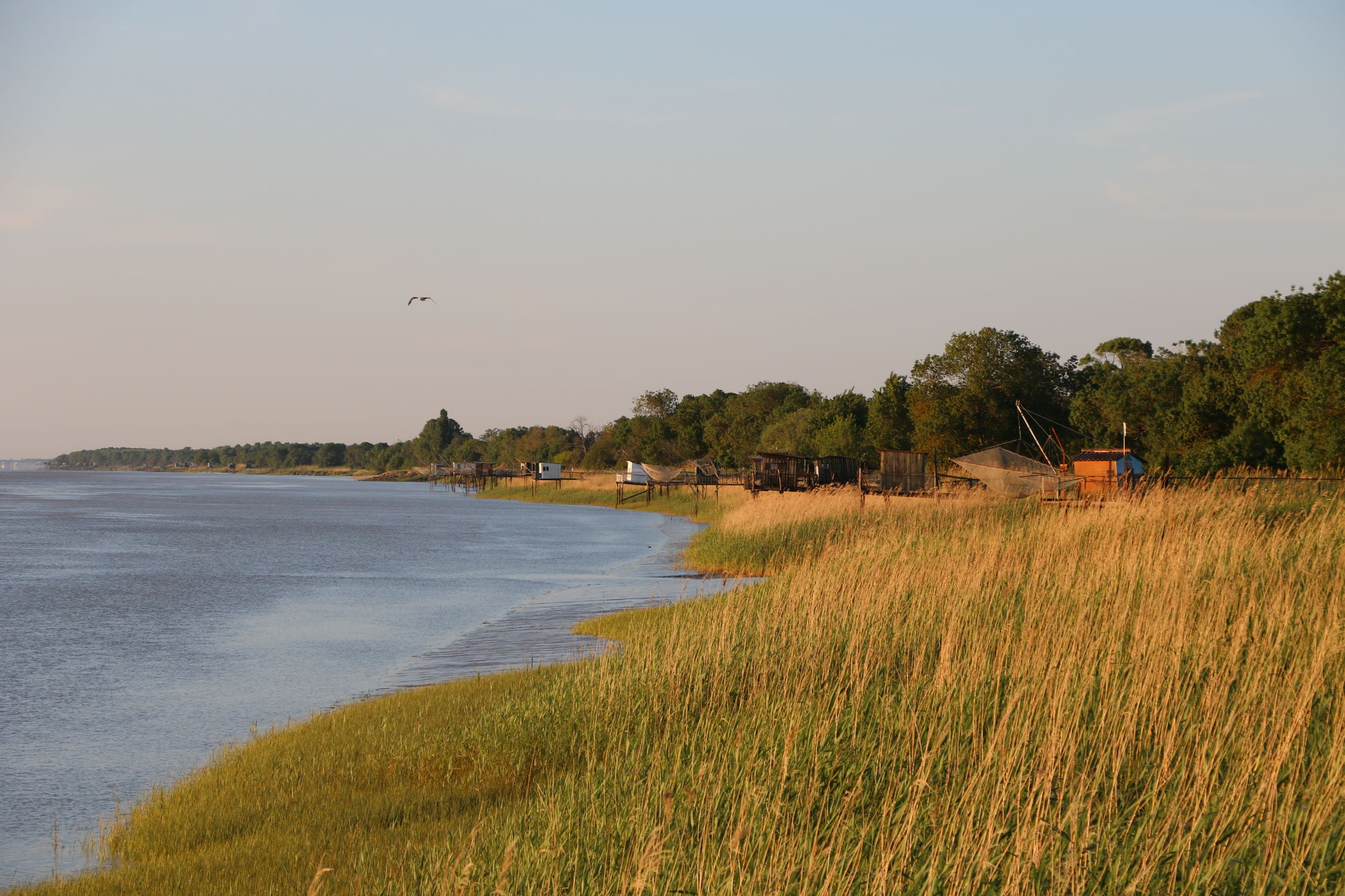
- Reed bed on the Gironde estuary in Pauillac

- Location within France
- Location: Nouvelle-Aquitaine
- Coordinates: 45°56′10″N 1°32′17″W
- Area: 6,500 km^{2} (2,500 sq mi)
- Established: 2015

The Gironde estuary and Pertuis sea Marine Nature Park is a protected area on the Gironde estuary and on the Atlantic coast of the departments Vendée, Charente-Maritime and Gironde, in western France. It was created in April 2015.

== Geography ==
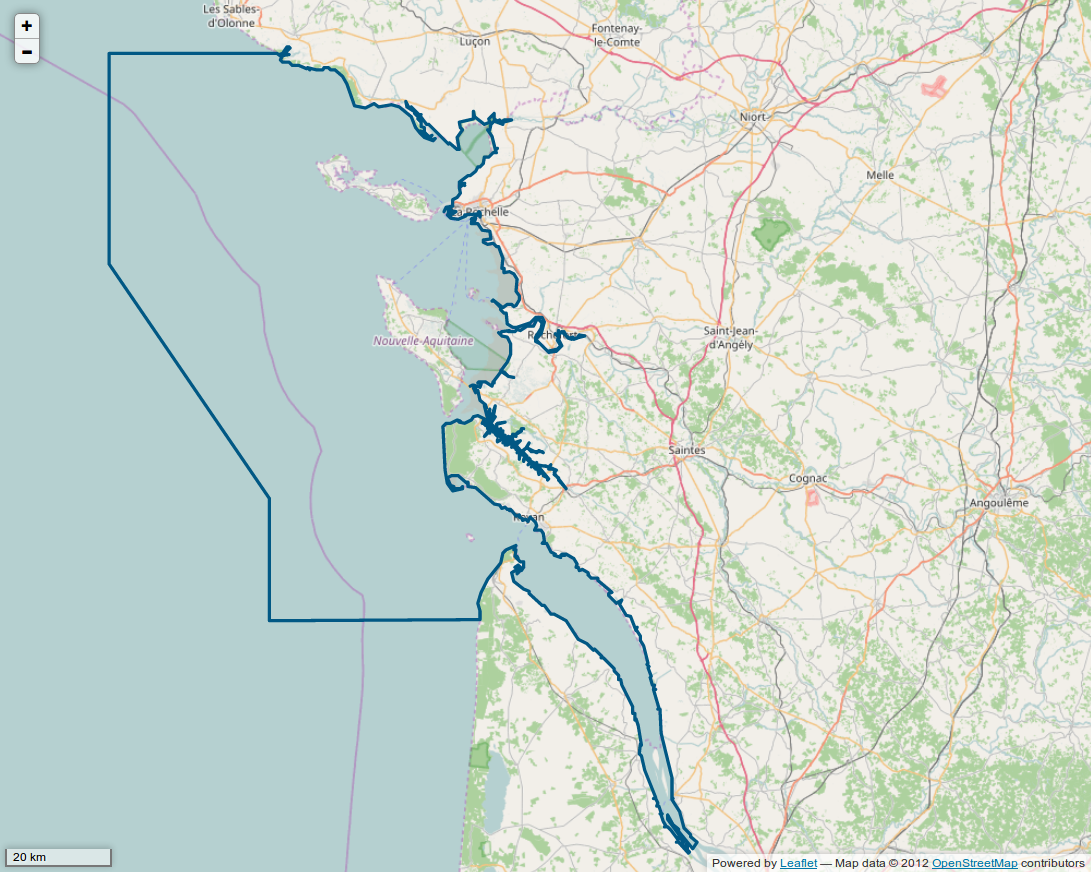
Map of the Marine Nature Park

The Marine Nature Park covers 6,500 km2 of marine area and encompasses all the Pertuis narrows, estuaries, the Gironde plume and extends off shore to a 50-metre water depth.

As the largest estuary in Western Europe, the Gironde is subject to very strong tidal currents and small islands appear and disappear at the whim of the river. It is located just downstream of the centre of Bordeaux.

114 coastal towns are part of the park along 1,000 kilometres of coastline.

The management board is in Marennes. Other main coastal towns are (from north to south): Saint-Martin-de-Ré, Sainte-Marie-de-Ré, La Rochelle, Rochefort, Saint-Pierre-d'Oléron, Le Château-d'Oléron, La Tremblade, Saint-Palais-sur-Mer, Royan, Soulac-sur-Mer, Pauillac.

== Landscape ==
Oyster farms, harbours and fishing huts mark the landscapes and the maritime culture. Long sandy beaches attract many tourists.

== Flora and fauna ==
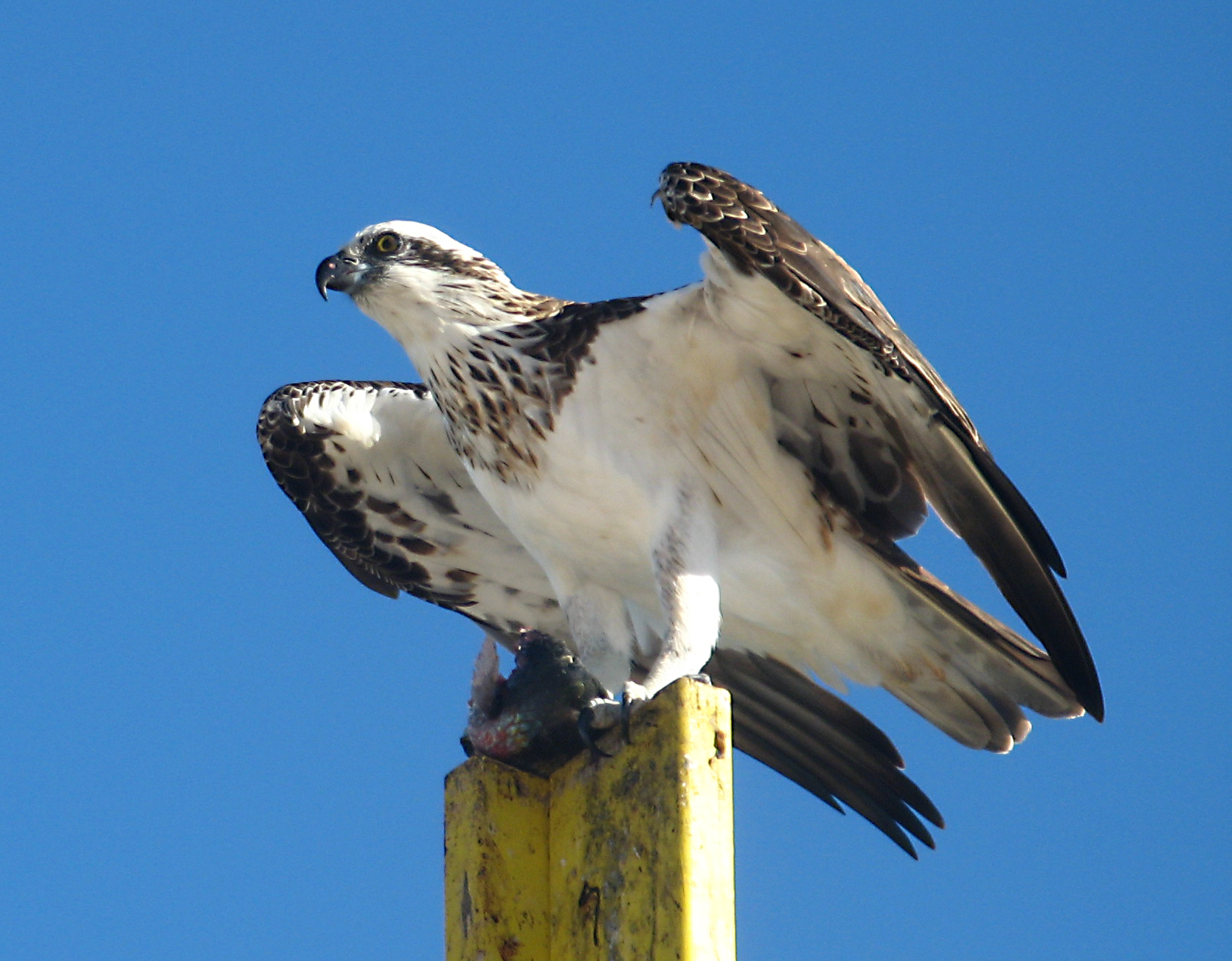
Osprey in Arvert peninsula

Marshes, narrows, reed beds, estuaries, foreshores and the Atlantic Ocean form a mosaic of habitats particularly favourable to birds and amphihaline fish. Leatherback turtles, basking sharks, gannets and storm petrels can also be found. Depending on their life cycle, species such as eels move through the different estuarine, coastal and marine environments.

== Gallery ==
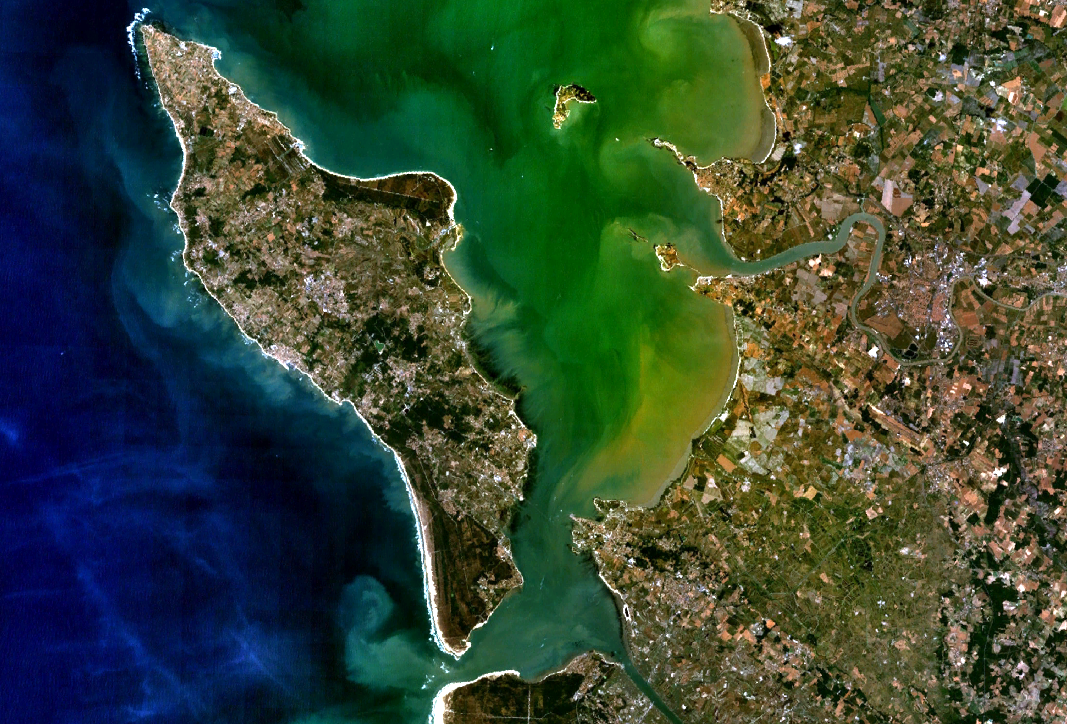
Satellite view of Oléron

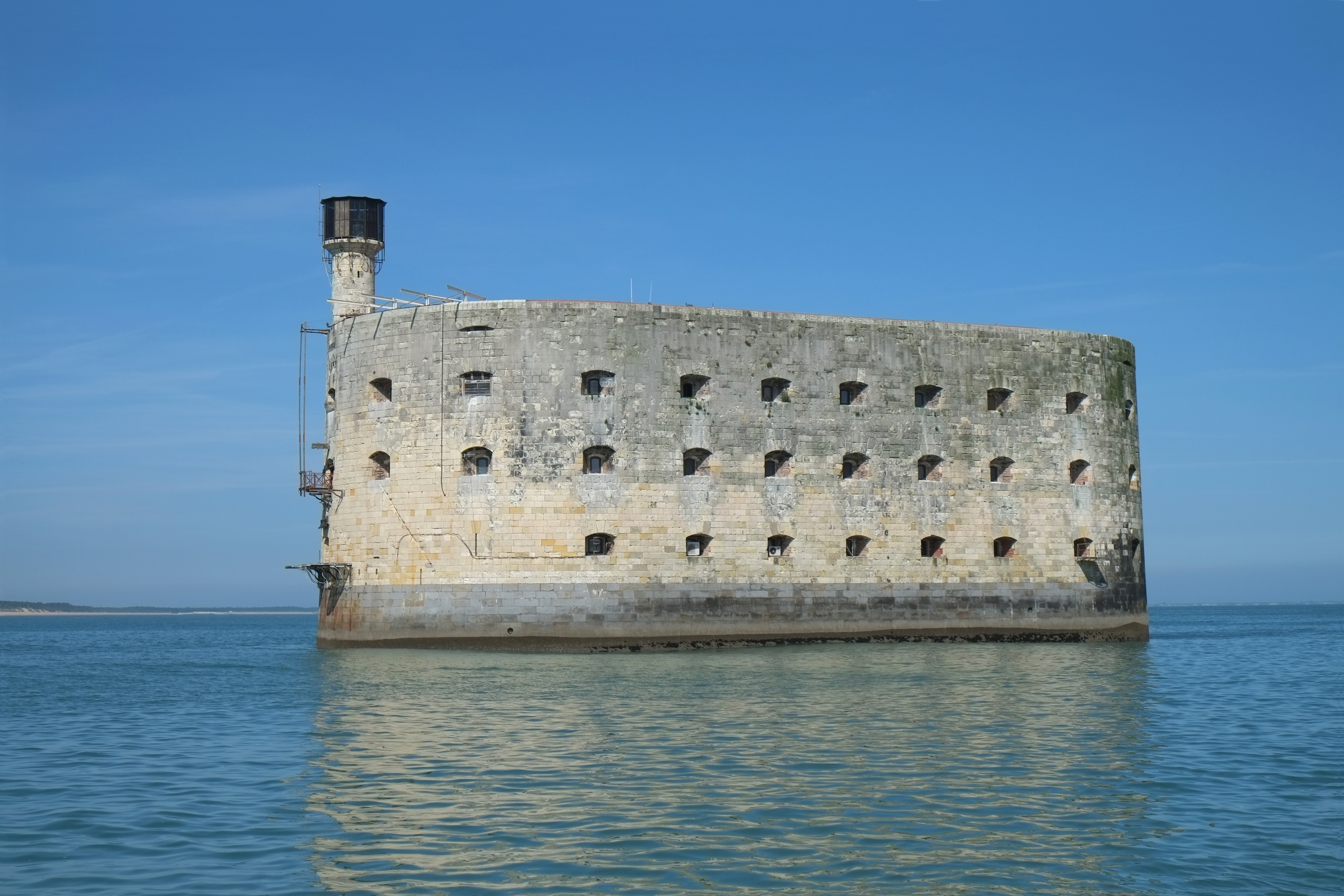
Fort Boyard in the Pertuis d'Antioche straits

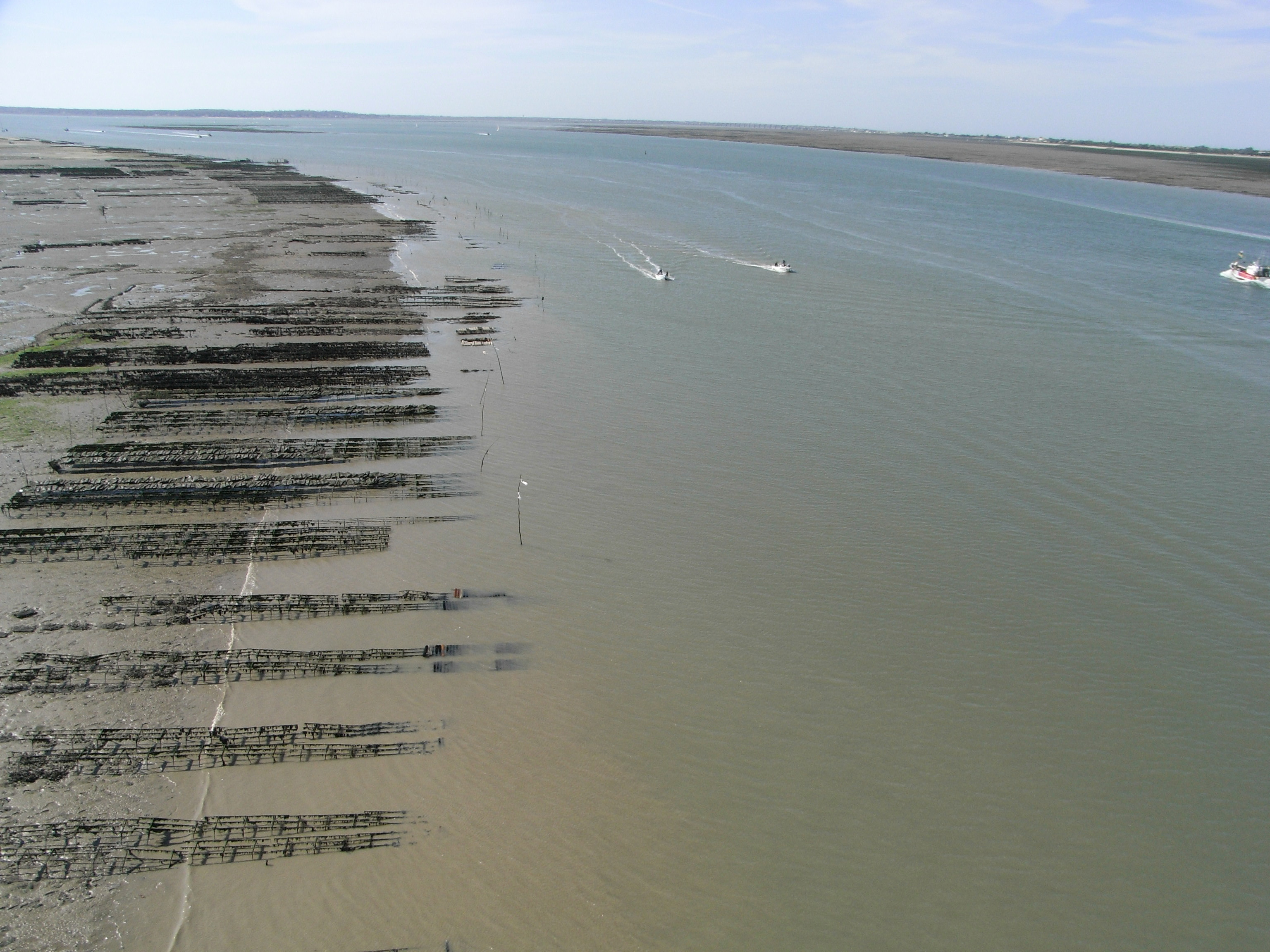
Oyster farm on the Seudre

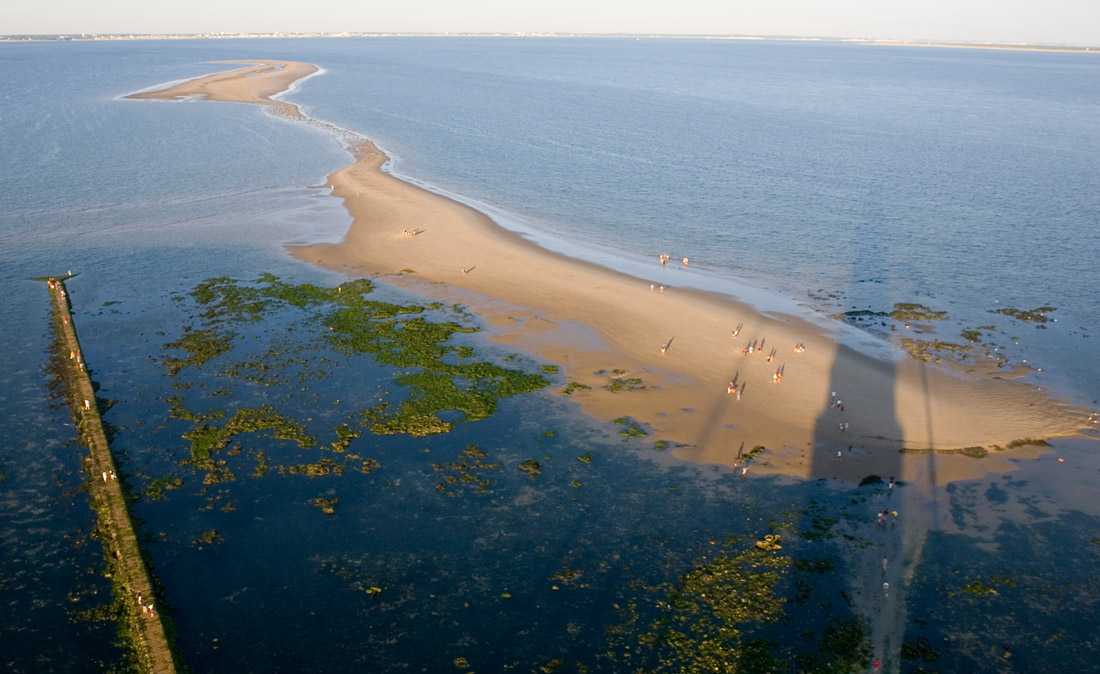
View from the top of Cordouan Lighthouse

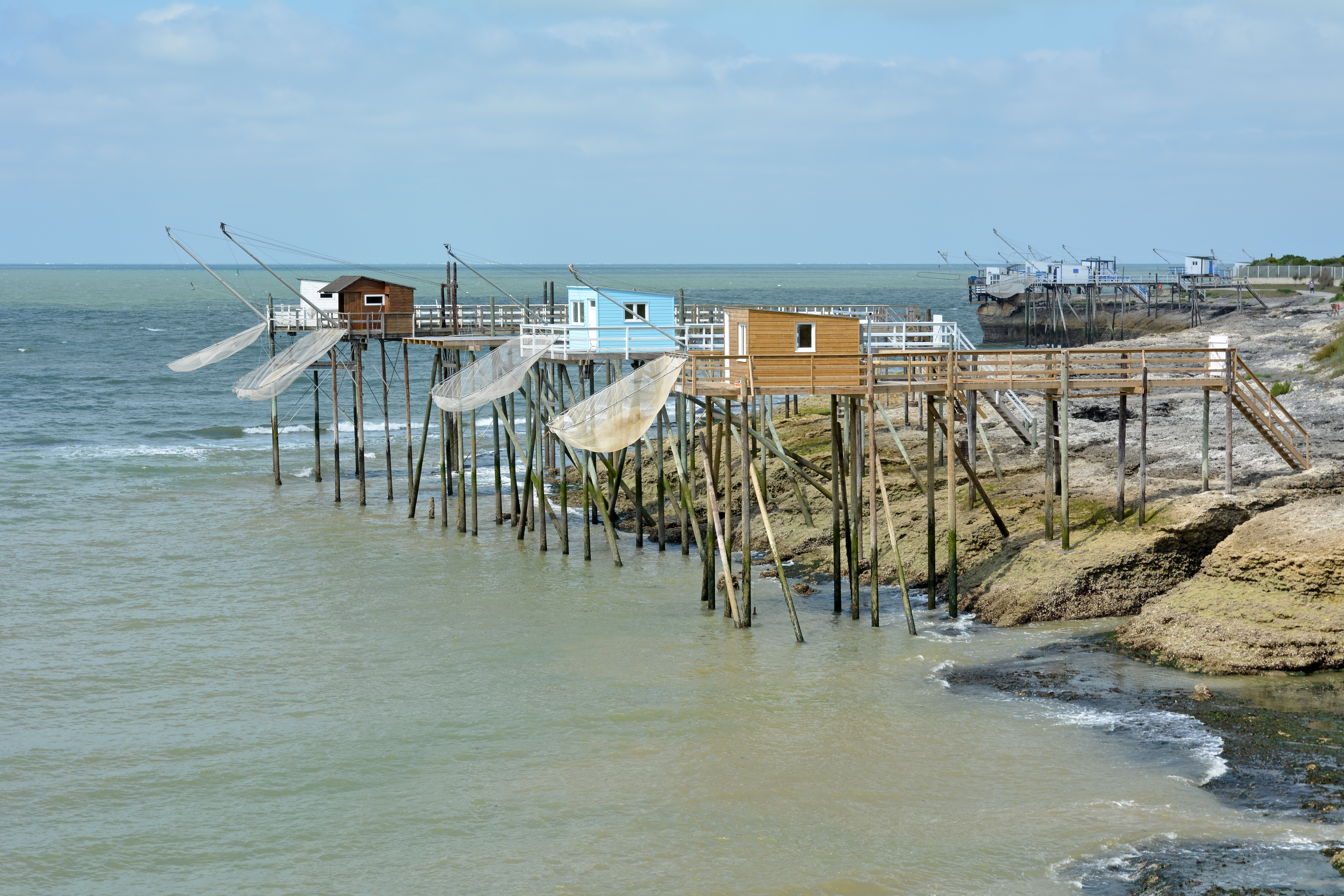
Fishing at the mouth of the Gironde estuary
