= Château Grand-Puy-Ducasse =

French winery

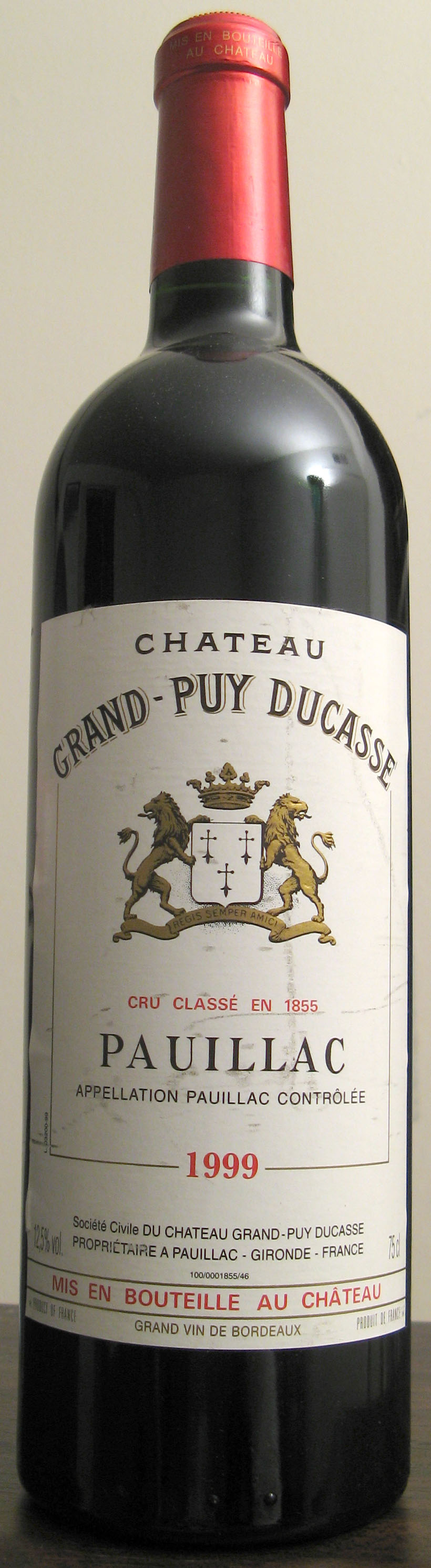

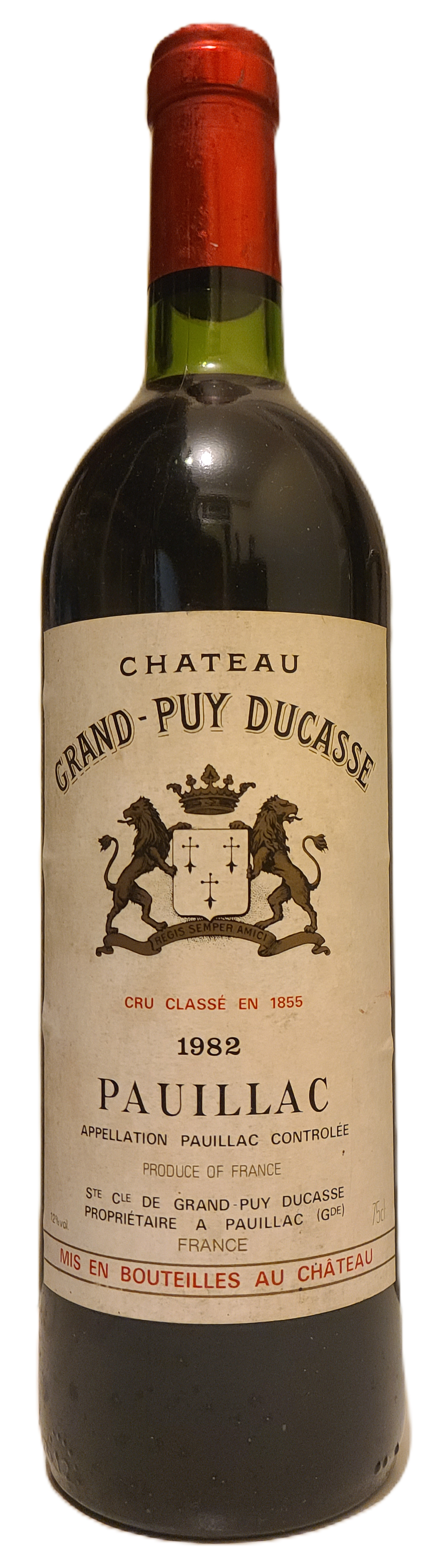

Château Grand-Puy-Ducasse is a French winery in the Pauillac appellation of the Bordeaux region of France. The wine produced here was classified as one of eighteen Cinquièmes Crus (Fifth Growths) in the Bordeaux Wine Official Classification of 1855.

== Name ==
This winery shares a part of its name with Château Grand-Puy-Lacoste. Grand Puy is the name of a low gravelly hill which used to be owned in its entirety by the same estate. Parts of the vineyards on this hill were sold in 1750 to a man by the name Pierre Ducasse, which was the origin of the name.
