= Château Grand-Puy-Lacoste =

French winery

Coordinates: 45.19007°N 0.76910°W

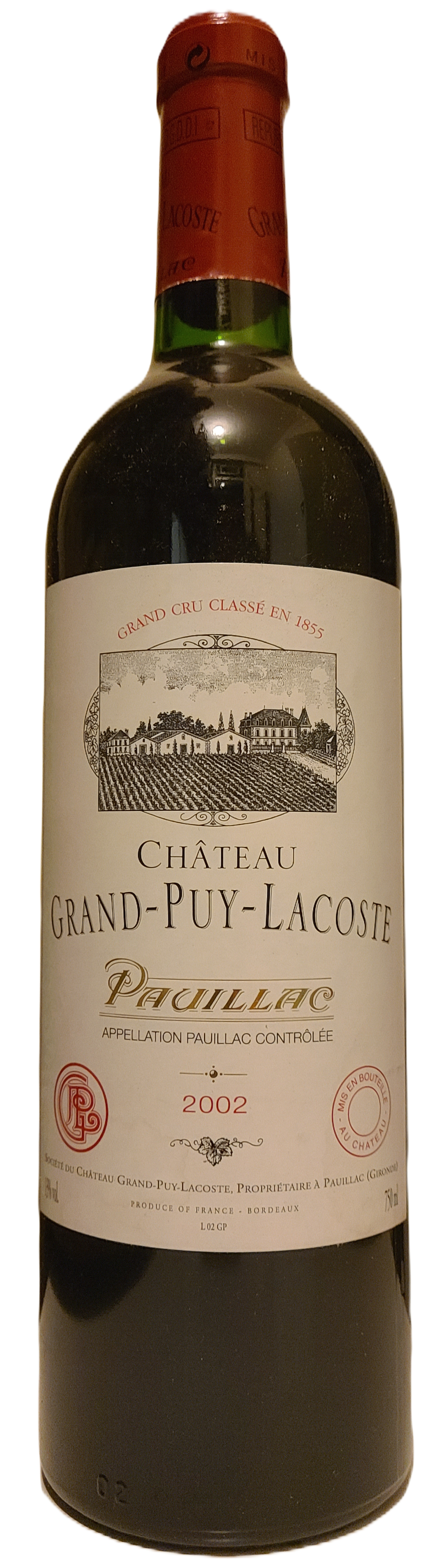
Grand Vin 2002

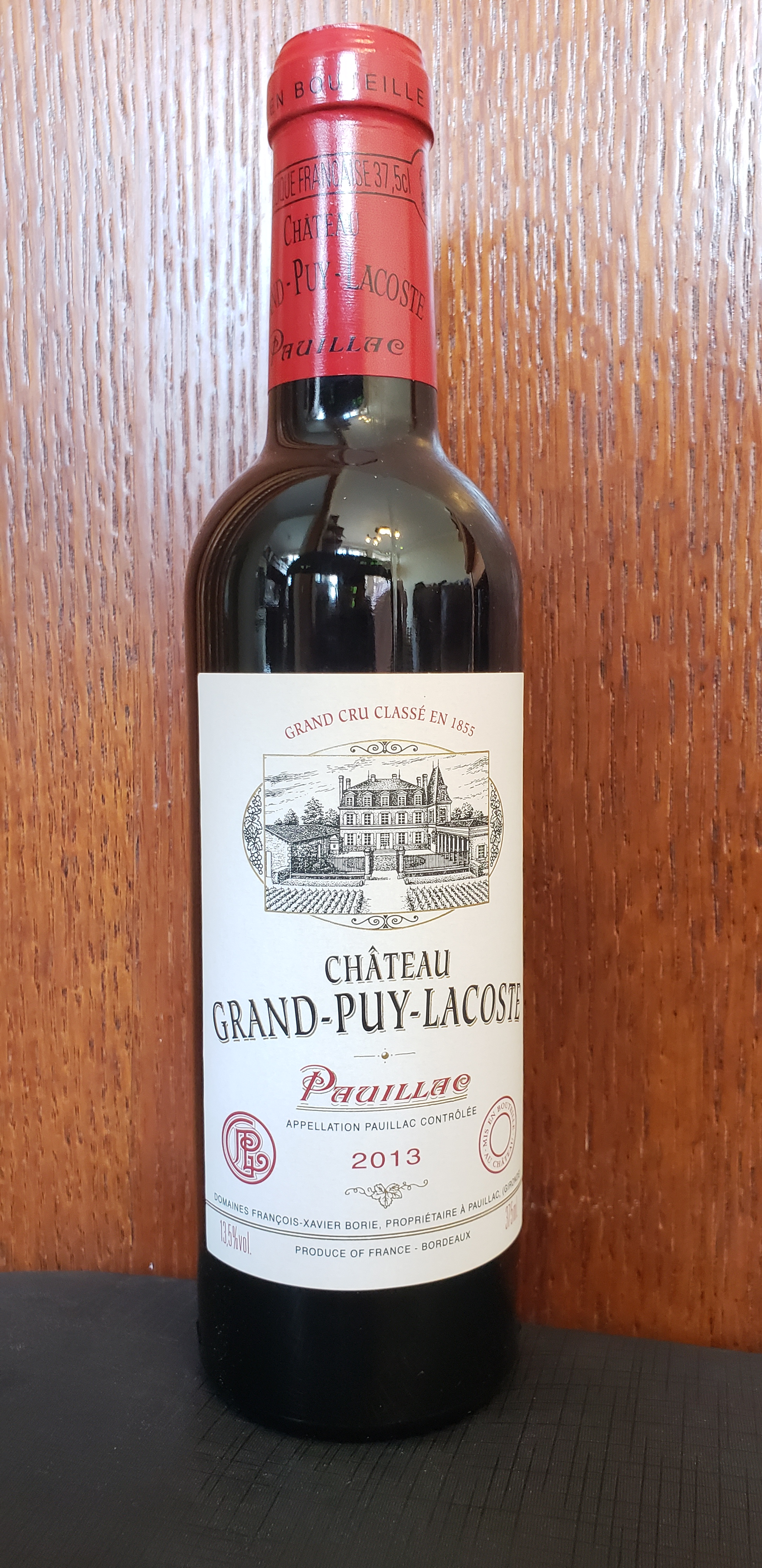

Château Grand-Puy-Lacoste is a winery in the Pauillac appellation of the Bordeaux region of France. Chateau Grand-Puy-Lacoste is also the name of the red wine produced by this property. The wine produced here was classified as one of eighteen Cinquièmes Crus (Fifth Growths) in the Bordeaux Wine Official Classification of 1855.

== Name ==
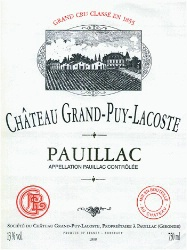
Chateau Grand-Puy-Lacoste Label

This winery shares a part of its name with Château Grand-Puy-Ducasse. Grand Puy is the name of a low gravelly hill which used to be owned in its entirety by the same estate. Parts of the vineyards on this hill were sold in 1750 to a man by the name Pierre Ducasse. The estate containing the remaining vineyards, the present day Château Grand-Puy-Lacoste, has been known under several names which have changed when daughters of the owning family have married. It was known as Saint-Guiron in the mid-19th century after a marriage to a monsieur de Saint-Guiron, and acquired its present name one generation later when a daughter married a man by the name François Lacoste.

== Vineyard ==
Situated a few kilometers from the town of Pauillac, the vineyards of Chateau Grand-Puy-Lacoste total roughly 36 hectares (90 acres) with Cabernet Sauvignon making up 75% of the total plantings and the rest belonging to Merlot (20%) and Cabernet Franc (5%). Typical of the region, the vineyard consists of a deep gravel top soil on a limestone base.

== Wine ==
Chateau Grand-Puy-Lacoste produces about 12,000 cases of wine in an average year. Fermentation takes place in temperature controlled stainless steel tanks, and then the wines are placed into oak barrels (50% new) for 18 months of aging.

The winery also makes a second wine, Lacoste-Borie.

== See also ==
- French Wine
- Bordeaux wine
