= Château Duhart-Milon =

Winery in the Bordeaux region of France

Coordinates: 45.1979°N 0.7470°W

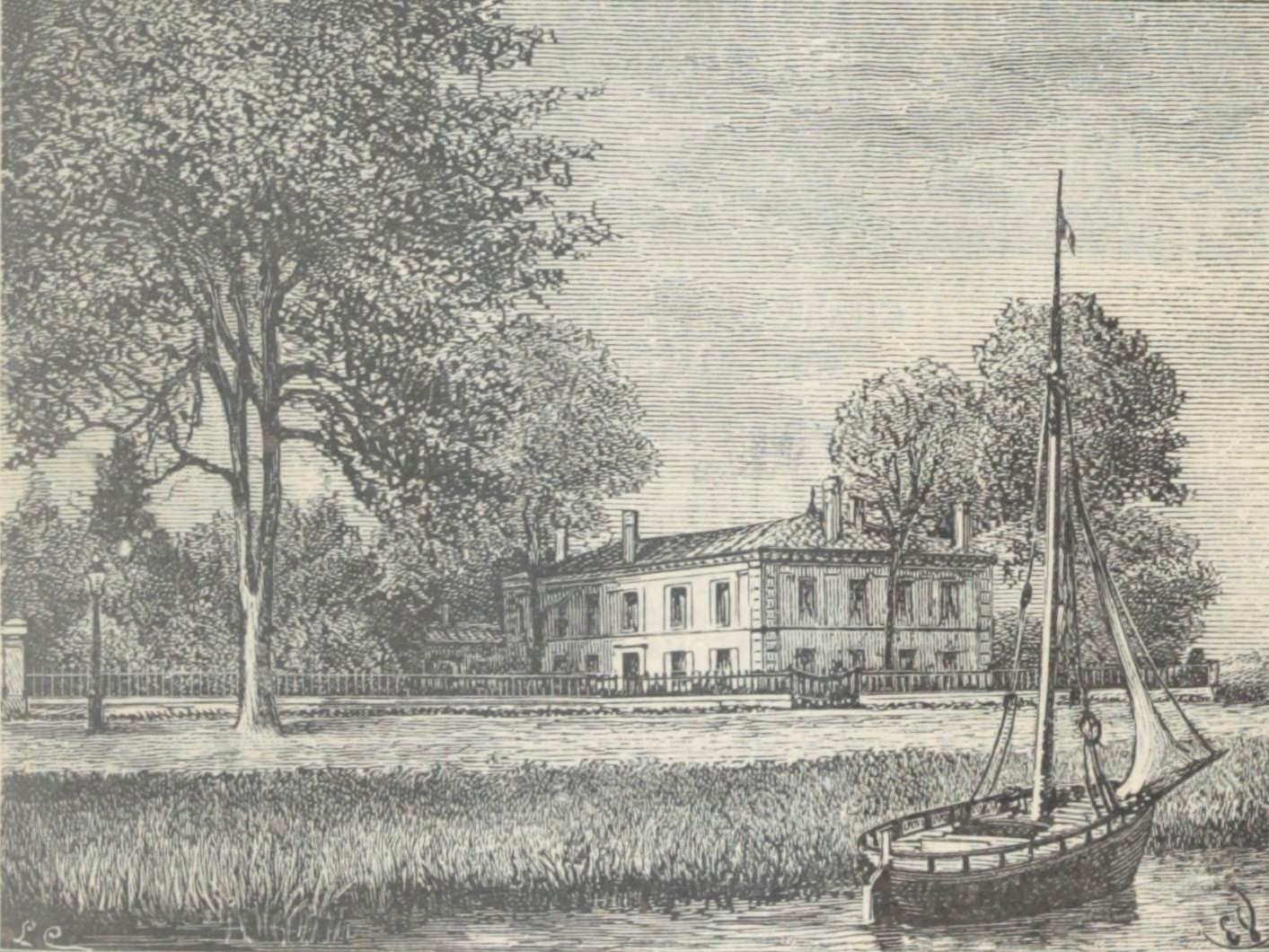

Château Duhart-Milon, previously also Château Duhart-Milon-Rothschild, is a winery in the Pauillac appellation of the Bordeaux region of France.

== History ==
As the story goes, "Sieur Duhart" was a corsair who settled in Pauillac. His house inspired the wine's label. During the XVIIth century, under the management of the House of Ségur, the vineyard was used for Château Lafite's second wine. During the 1830s, the land was purchased by the Castéja family. A 110-acre vineyard was created and later renamed Château Duhart-Milon. The Castéja family sold Duhart-Milon in 1937, and five owners managed the château in the following twenty-five years. Château Duhart-Milon was acquired by Domaines Barons de Rothschild in 1962.

The wine produced here was classified as one of ten Quatrièmes Crus Classés (Fourth Growths) in the historic Bordeaux Wine Official Classification of 1855.

== Description ==
The Château, adjacent to the Château Lafite Rothschild, has 175 acres (0.71 km^{2}) planted with Cabernet Sauvignon (67%) and Merlot (33%). The Château produces a second wine under the label Moulin de Duhart. It is managed by Eric Kohler since 2015.
