= Château Chasse-Spleen =

Winery in the Bordeaux region of France

Coordinates: 45.07390°N 0.74045°W

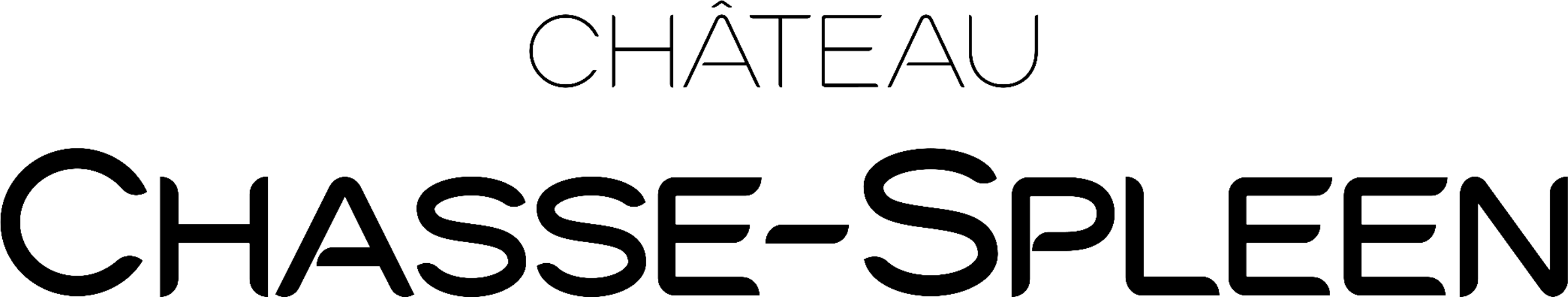
- Product type: Red Bordeaux wine
- Current owner: Céline Villars-Foubet
- Country: France
- Introduced: 1560; 466 years ago (first viticulture); 1865; 161 years ago (estate name established); 1932; 94 years ago (Cru Bourgeois Exceptionnel)
- Website: chasse-spleen.com

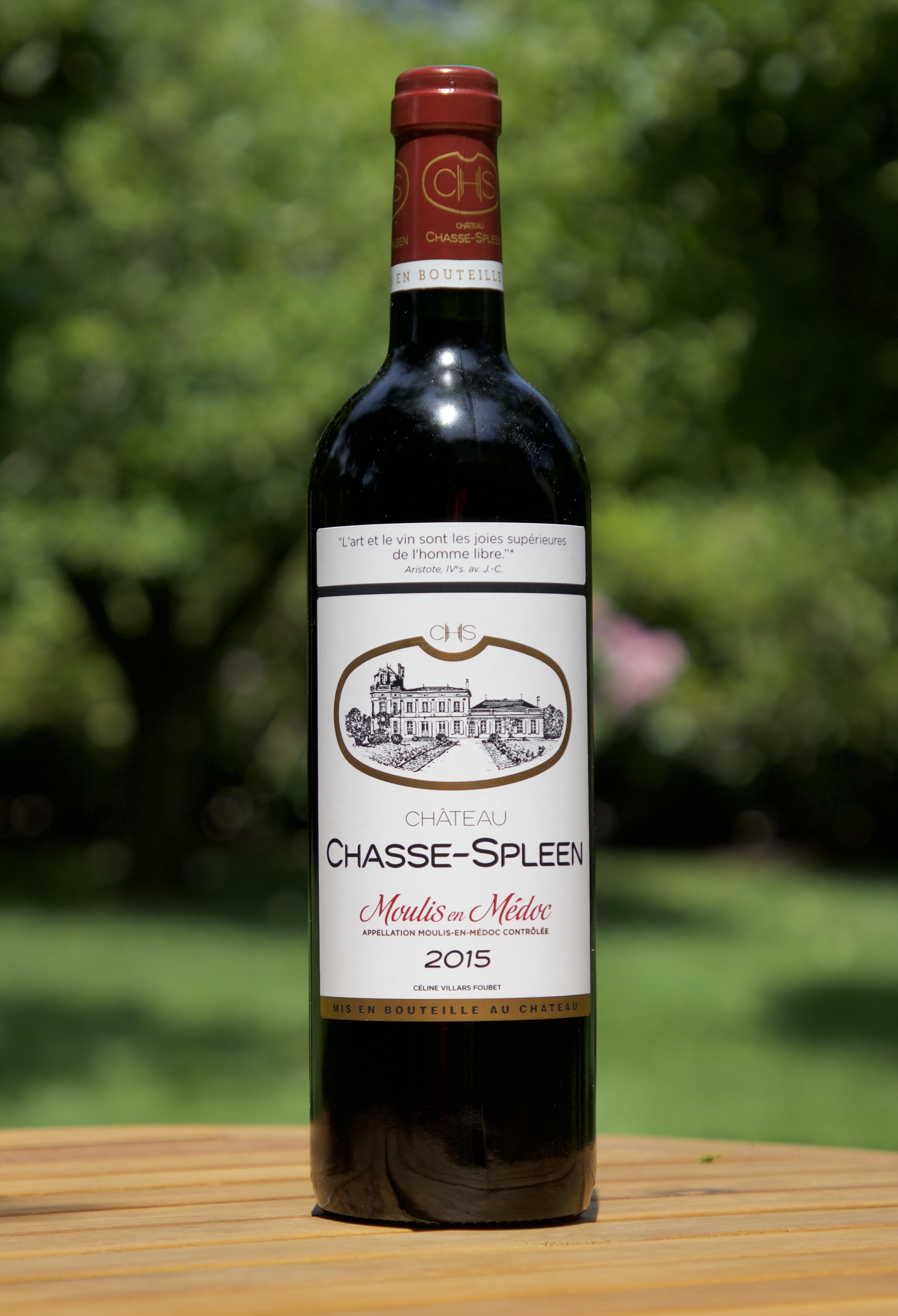
Bottle of Château Chasse-Spleen

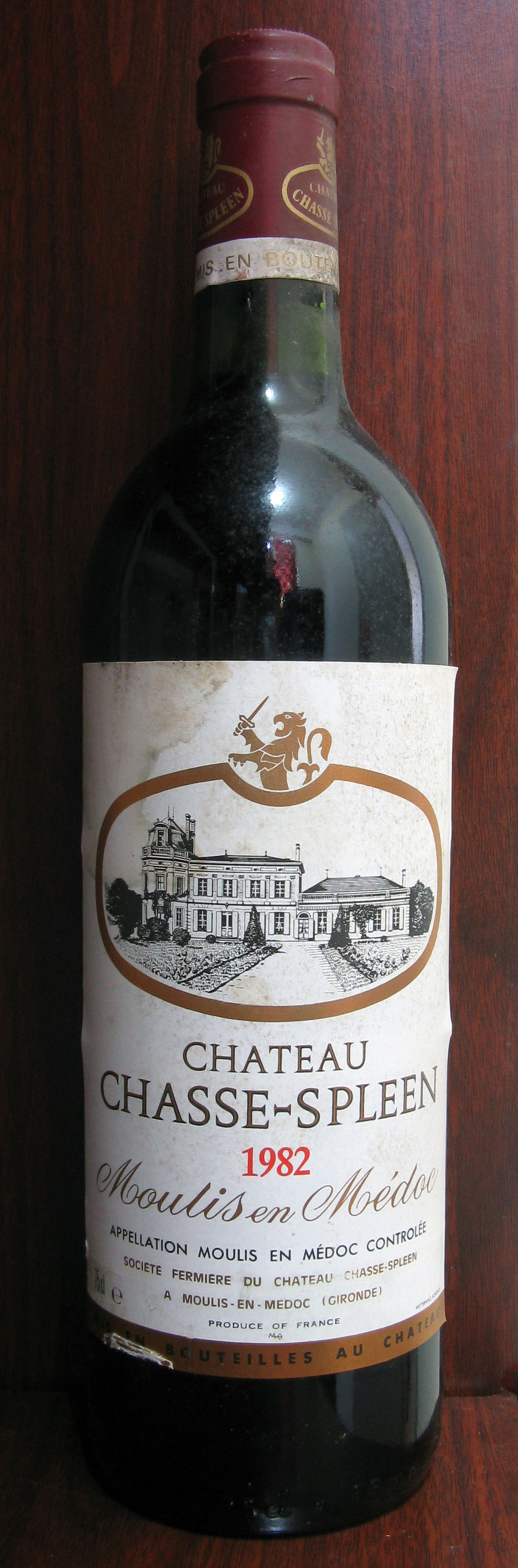
Legendary 1982

Château Chasse-Spleen is a winery in the Moulis-en-Médoc appellation of the Bordeaux region of France, just north-west of Margaux. Château Chasse-Spleen was selected as one of six Crus Exceptionnels in the Cru Bourgeois classification of 1932, and through later revisions until the annulment of the classification in 2007. The estate is today widely considered to be of cru classé standard.

The name means "to chase away the blues" or "dispels melancholy". A second wine is produced under the label L'Héritage de Chasse-Spleen and another titled l'Oratoire de Chasse-Spleen.

== History ==
Long viewed as the leading cru of Moulis, the estate's viticultural history is documented back to 1560, and possibly before. Initially an estate named Grand-Poujeaux, it was owned by the seigneurs Grenier, which may have evolved into Gressier. The estate was divided in 1822 due to inheritance complications, with half the property becoming Château Gressier-Grand-Poujeaux, and the remainder being passed to the Castaing family. Further divisions in the 1860s resulted in what would become Chasse-Spleen, and the châteaux Maucaillou and Poujeaux.

One account explaining the estate's name comes from a visit by Lord Byron in 1821, when he became so enthralled by the vines that he said, "Quel remede pour chasser le spleen", or alternately attributed to the poem Spleen whose author Charles Baudelaire once visited the property.

After the death of the last Castaing, from 1909 to 1914 Chasse-Spleen was owned by the Segnitz family, north-German wine merchants who contributed to the quality and reputation of the estate, but after the outbreak of World War I the estate was confiscated as "enemy property", and eventually bought by auction in 1922 by the Lahary family. After maintaining the reputation of the wine for several decades, Chasse-Spleen was sold in 1976 to a consortium controlled by the Merlaut family, eventual owners of châteaux including Gruaud-Larose, Ferrière, Citran and Haut-Bages-Libéral.

After changing career from teacher to winemaker, Jacques Merlaut's daughter Bernadette Villars and her husband took control of the estate and with the collaboration of Professor Émile Peynaud, great improvements to the facilities and quality of wine followed. She became a figure of renown before she and her husband died in a mountaineering accident in the Pyrenees in 1992. Currently, the estate is run by her daughter Céline Villars-Foubet. Her sister, Claire Vilars Lurton, took over the management of Châteaux Ferrière, Haut-Bages Libéral and La Gurgue

In February 2023, it was announced Château Chasse-Spleen had acquired the neighbouring estate, Château Brillette.

== Production ==
The vineyard area extends 80 hectares, with the grape varieties of 73% Cabernet Sauvignon, 20% Merlot, and 7% Petit Verdot.

On average 28,000 cases are produced annually of the Grand vin, and of the two second wines L'Héritage de Chasse-Spleen and l'Oratoire de Chasse-Spleen, there is produced approximately 14,000 cases.

== Gallery ==
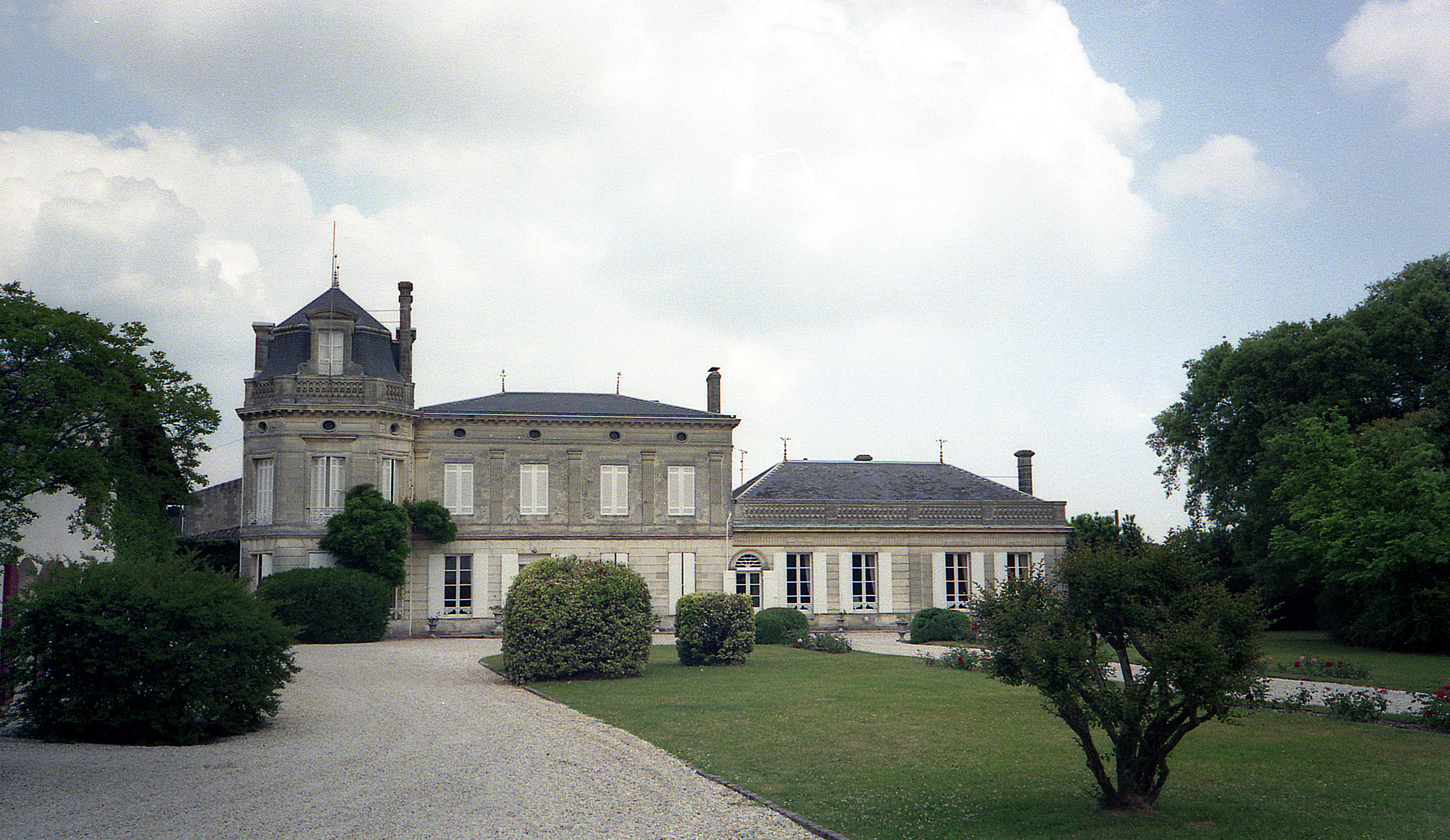
The Château Chasse-Spleen

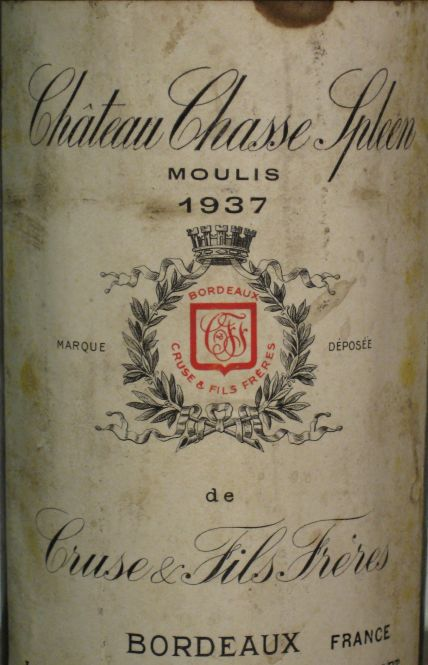
Detail of 1937 wine label

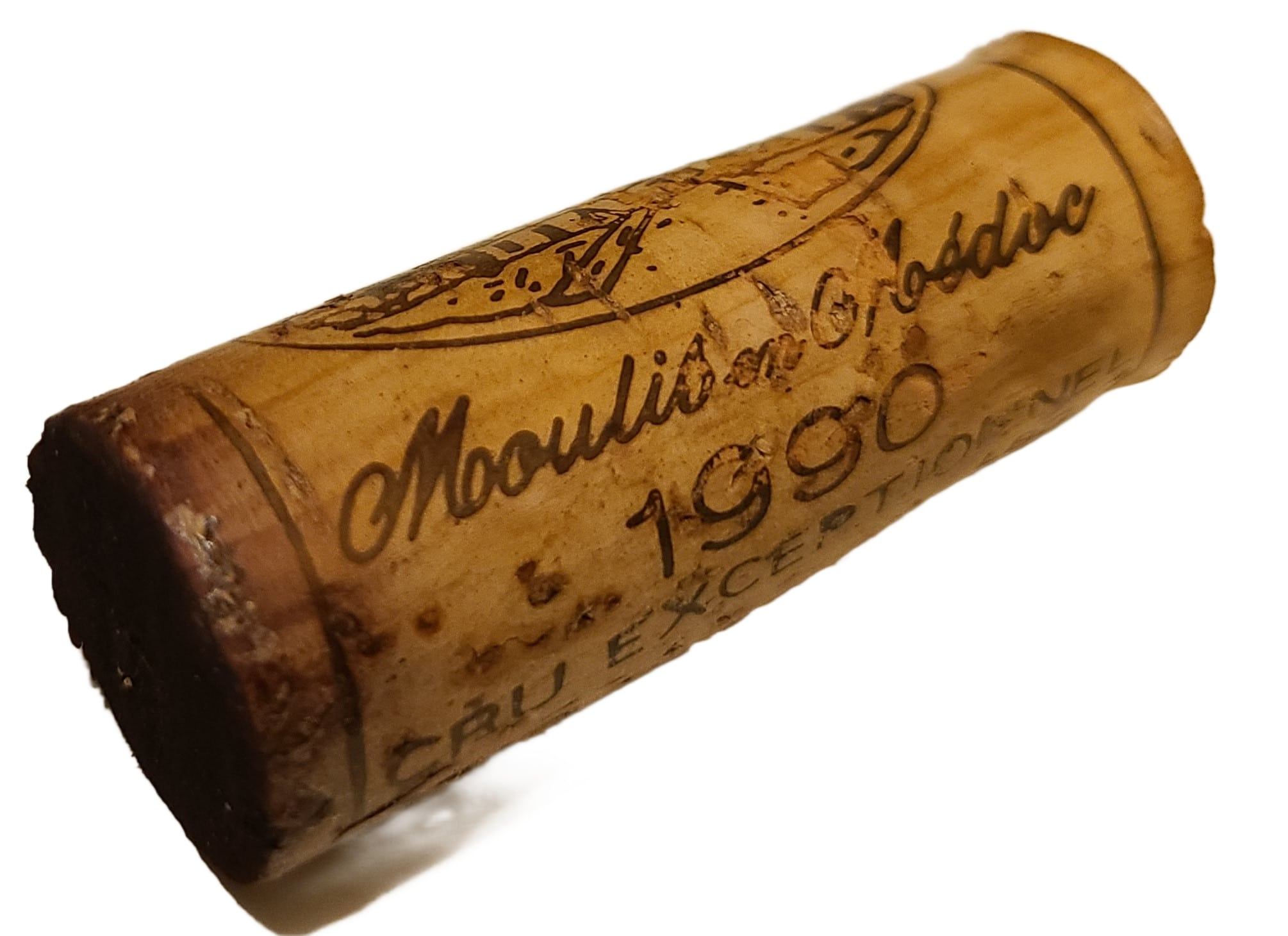
Cork of Château Chasse-Spleen 1990

== In popular culture ==
Downton Abbey, Season 6, Episode 6. Carson brings some Chateau Chasse-Spleen to a bed ridden Robert Crawley, Earl of Grantham.
