= Louis du Vergier de La Rochejaquelein =

French general and Vendean leader (1777–1915)

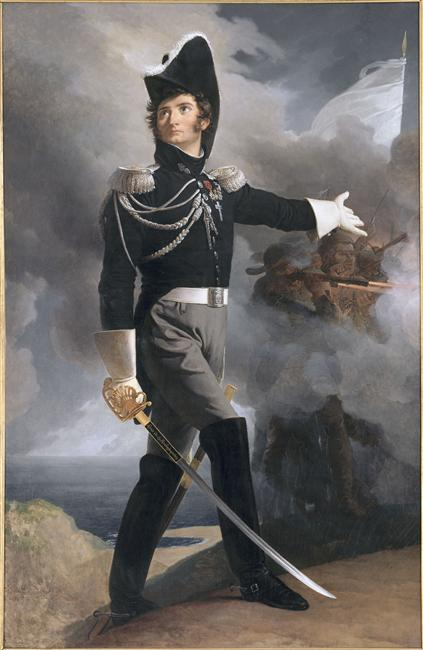
- Louis du Vergier de la Rochejaquelein by Pierre-Narcisse Guérin
- Born: November 30, 1777; Saint-Aubin-de-Baubigné, France
- Died: June 4, 1815 (aged 37); Saint-Hilaire-de-Riez, France
- Military career
- Allegiance: Armée des émigrés Kingdom of France; Catholic and Royal Army
- Rank: General
- Commands: Catholic and Royal Army
- Conflicts: French Revolutionary Wars; Haitian Revolution; War in the Vendée and Chouannerie of 1815

Louis du Vergier de La Rochejaquelein (30 November 1777 – 5 June 1815) was a French soldier and a Vendean general. At the age of 37, he was killed at the Battle of Mathes in Saint-Hilaire-de-Riez (Vendée).

He was the brother of Henri and Auguste du Vergier de La Rochejaquelein.

== Biography ==
=== Origin ===
He was the son of "Marquis" Henri Louis Auguste du Vergier de La Rochejaquelein (1749–1802) and Constante de Caumont d'Adde (1749–1798). He was only twelve years old when the French Revolution broke out. He followed his father to Germany, and at the age of sixteen, he saw his first military action in the Austrian regiment of Latour. He then moved to Great Britain, entered the service of that power, and fought in two campaigns on the island of Saint-Domingue, before returning to France in 1801.

=== Return to France ===
In 1802, he married Victoire de Donnissan, the widow of the Marquis de Lescure, a hero of the early wars in the Vendée. Having retired to his estates, he awaited the opportunity to serve the cause to which his entire family was devoted.

Napoleon I attempted in vain to win over the Marquis de La Rochejaquelein with the lure of positions, dignities, and honors. Firm in his sentiments and principles, La Rochejaquelein lived in retirement, sometimes in Poitou and sometimes at the Château Citran near Bordeaux. During his time at Citran, he maintained close ties with the royalist underground in the city, particularly the "Knights of the Faith" (Chevaliers de la Foi). Despite being under the surveillance of the imperial police, he was protected by the local municipal authorities, including the mayor Jean-Baptiste Lynch, who personally warned him of a planned arrest in November 1813.

His noble refusals made it clear with what fervor he would eventually serve the Bourbons. Twice he was on the verge of giving the signal for a new insurrection in the Vendée, and twice the hesitations of Europe caused his projects to fail. To gauge public sentiment, he constantly traveled through Guyenne and the Vendée, where his name alone could rally forty thousand royalists in a moment.

=== The Restoration ===
From March 1813, La Rochejaquelein coordinated with an envoy of the King to re-establish the royalist party in Bordeaux. By early 1814, as the Napoleonic administration in the city was paralyzed by an economic crisis and mass desertions, he acted as a primary liaison between the local conspirators and the Allied forces. In March 1814, he secretly crossed the lines to reach Saint-Jean-de-Luz, where he met with the Duke of Wellington. He successfully convinced the British commander that Bordeaux was ready to declare for the Bourbons, provided that Allied troops supported the movement to prevent a massacre by the imperial garrison. During this same mission, the perils of which he braved entirely, he presented the city's loyalty to the Duke of Angoulême, who was then with the Allied army.

The mission was crowned with the greatest success, and the people of Bordeaux enthusiastically received the liberating prince, showing their gratitude to the Vendean gentleman who had prepared such a triumph for them. The success of the royalist coup on 12 March 1814 was largely due to the "clandestine work" of La Rochejaquelein's network, which allowed Mayor Lynch to surrender the city without a shot being fired, effectively making Bordeaux the first major French city to officially reject Napoleon.

Upon the first return of Louis XVIII, La Rochejaquelein was appointed head of one of the military corps of the guard (commander of the Royal Grenadiers) and promoted to the rank of general officer.

When Napoleon returned to France, La Rochejaquelein, along with other devoted servants, protected the King's retreat to the northern borders and then to Ghent. From that city, he traveled to Great Britain to solicit aid for the Vendée, obtaining arms, ammunition, and subsidies. He set sail again and, on 16 May, landed on the coast of Saint-Hilaire-de-Riez, where he raised an insurrection among a portion of the local population.

=== The Military Vendée ===
In a few days, through the rapidity of his operations, he raised and armed a large part of the Vendée militaire. His success justified him against charges of haste and temerity. Remaining within reach of the coast, the Marquis requested a second landing of supplies and sought to be recognized as commander-in-chief, both to give the insurrection more cohesion and to establish his authority with Admiral Hottans, who was responsible for providing aid to the royalists. It was generally admitted that a single leader was necessary to bring all operations under a unified command. In a meeting at Palluau, the Marquis was recognized by Sapinaud and Suzannet, and shortly thereafter by d'Autichamp.

Everything was being prepared for a movement toward the coast; however, as soon as two divisions were united at Aizenay, General Travot arrived, surprised them, and dispersed them in a night attack. Desperate to repair the situation, La Rochejaquelein first conferred with d'Autichamp, who promised to act in concert, and ordered his brother, Auguste de La Rochejaquelein, to move in haste toward the Marais. The Royal Army then consisted of four organized and distinct corps.

=== End of the insurrectionary movement ===
Napoleon I learned of this second insurrection on the night of 17 May and hurried to take measures to halt the movement. He invited three Vendean leaders—Malartie, Flavigny, and La Béraudière—to act as pacifiers toward their former comrades-in-arms, urging them to understand that the fate of France would not be decided in the fields of the Vendée. Simultaneously, he supported these negotiations with a corps of 12,000 men under the command of General Lamarque. Some leaders listened to the pacifiers, but the Marquis de La Rochejaquelein refused any accommodation. On 1 June, he arrived at Croix-de-Vie and established the movements of the various army corps through a general order.

Upon learning of the proposals from the Minister of Police, Fouché, La Rochejaquelein rejected them with indignation, determined to rebuff any arrangement with the Imperial government. This led to a deplorable disagreement with other leaders who were inclined to listen to the negotiators. The landing of supplies was to begin on 2 June at Croix-de-Vie, protected by the other chiefs; however, while on board the British admiral's ship, La Rochejaquelein learned that one royalist column had been disbanded and two others were retreating into the interior. At that very moment, General Travot arrived with his troops, passing, as it were, through the three army corps that were abandoning their general. Filled with indignation and inspired by the examples of Bonchamps, Lescure, and his illustrious brother, La Rochejaquelein gave the signal for the landing, protecting it alone with a handful of insurgents.

He first sustained an attack at Saint-Gilles, where a sharp skirmish broke out between Travot's vanguard and the Vendeans of the Marais; the latter had the advantage. A British fleet, including the Superbe, the famous Bellerophon, and several frigates, approached the coast. La Rochejaquelein personally oversaw everything, and despite the gunfire, the landing was not interrupted. British boats, carrying 15,000 muskets, 12 cannons, and a vast quantity of powder, shuttled back and forth while the fighting continued at Saint-Gilles. However, Travot’s main force was advancing. Suspecting that Travot intended to force the passage of Rié, Louis de La Rochejaquelein halted the landing, marched to meet the enemy himself, directed the convoy into the Marais, and arrived at Saint-Jean-de-Monts on 3 June with the division of his brother Auguste.

=== Death ===
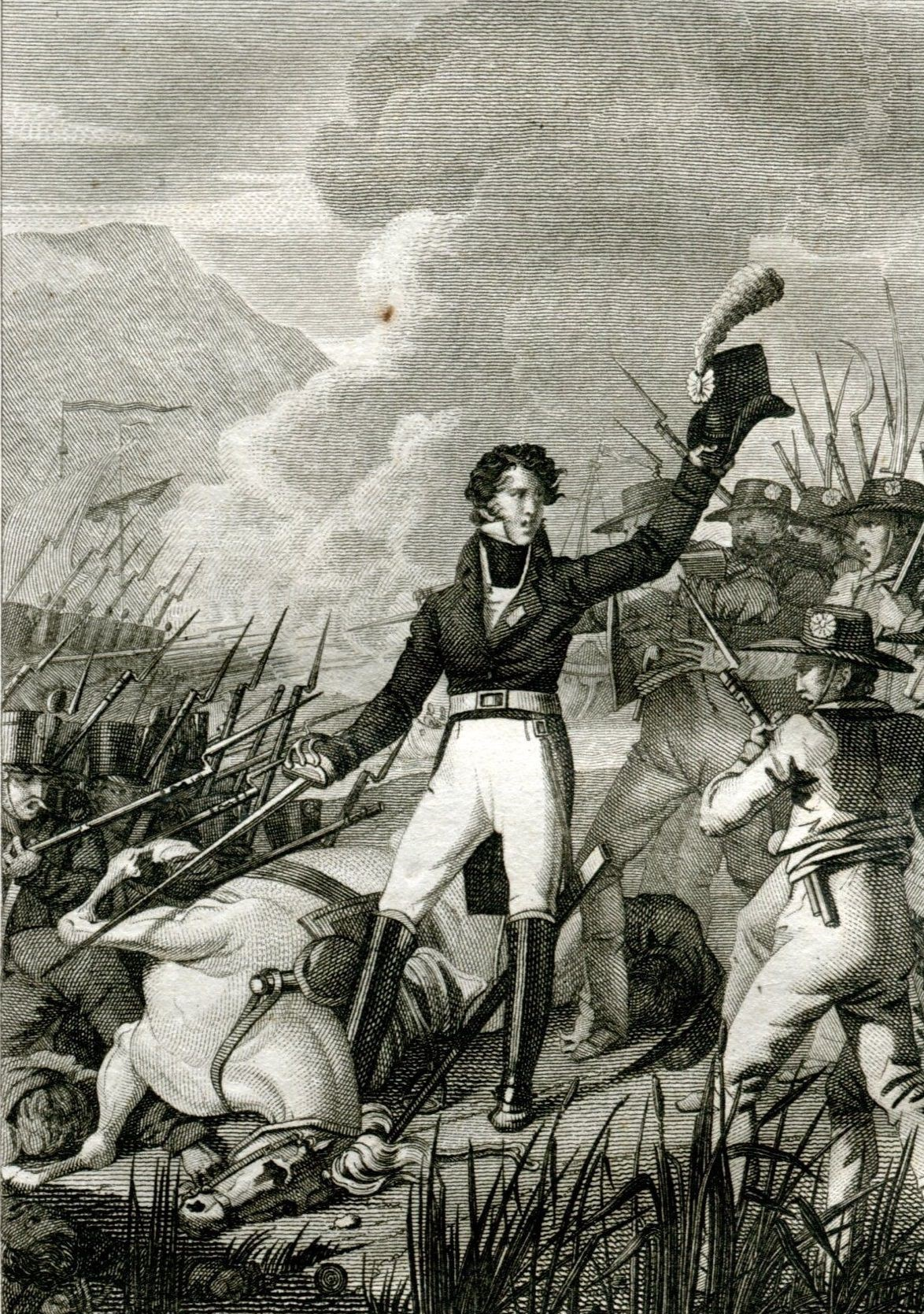
If I advance, follow me; if I retreat, kill me; if I die, avenge me!, drawing by Charles Abraham Chasselat and engraving by Auguste II Blanchard, 1816.

There, he learned that a strong column was approaching; it was commanded by General Étienne Estève, who, at daybreak the following day, moved toward the Mathes farm on the edge of the Marais. Orders were immediately given to the royalists to march to meet him. Arriving within half a musket shot, Estève took the offensive; twice he was repulsed by the Vendeans. Realizing he was about to be outflanked, he made a final effort to force a passage. A parish leader faltered, leading his troops in retreat. Louis de La Rochejaquelein ran to rally his soldiers, and at the height of the action, he was struck by a bullet in the chest, fell, and died in the front rank. He was 37 years old.

His brother Auguste was wounded fifteen paces from the enemy, and the entire line was broken. Such was the Battle of Les Mathes, where the brother of the hero of the Vendée met his end. His body, remaining on the battlefield, was identified the next day and buried in haste in the village of Perrier.

On the following 8 February, his remains were exhumed to be transported to the tomb of his ancestors. He is buried with his brothers in the church of Saint-Aubin-de-Baubigné in Deux-Sèvres. The entire population of the Marais gathered at the site of the exhumation to pay a final tribute to the general. The Marquis de La Rochejaquelein was endowed with all the qualities that grant ascendancy to a party leader. He left behind eight children and a widow.

== Titles ==
- 30 November 1777: Monsieur Louis du Vergier de La RochejaqueleinAt birth; as the son of the Marquis de La Rochejaquelein.
- 28 January 1794: Monsieur Louis du Vergier, Comte de La RochejaqueleinUpon the death of his brother, Comte de La Rochejaquelein; as the son and direct heir of the Marquis de La Rochejaquelein.
- 6 September 1802: Monsieur Louis du Vergier, Marquis de La RochejaqueleinUpon the death of his father, the Marquis de La Rochejaquelein.

== Bibliography ==
- Michaud, Louis-Gabriel (1824). Biographie universelle, ancienne et moderne. Vol. 38. Paris: Michaud. pp. 325–327.
- Maudet, Xavier (7 July 2020). "Mauléon : quand l'actualité rattrape le passé esclavagiste du marquis de la Rochejaquelein". ouest-france.fr. Le Courrier de l'Ouest Deux-Sèvres.
- Coste, Laurent (1993). "Bordeaux et la restauration des Bourbons". Annales du Midi. 105 (201): 27–43. doi:10.3406/anami.1993.2342.
- Alison, Archibald (1843). History of Europe from the Commencement of the French Revolution in 1789, to the Restoration of the Bourbons in 1815. Vol. 4. New York: Harper & Brothers.
- Grand Palais (Paris, France) (1975). French Painting 1774–1830: The Age of Revolution. New York: Metropolitan Museum of Art.
- Hérault, André-Hubert; Raigniac, Jean de (1999). Le canton de Saint-Gilles-Croix-de-Vie en Vendée. Bonnefonds. ISBN 978-2951317529.
- Bougnoux, Daniel; Forest, Philippe; Leuilliot, Bernard (1997). Œuvres romanesques complètes. Vol. 4. Paris: Gallimard.
- La Rochejaquelein, Marie-Louise-Victoire, marquise de (1933). Biggane, Cecil (ed.). Memoirs of the Marquise de la Rochejaquelein. London: G. Routledge & Sons.
- Graule, Henri (1895). Histoire de Lescure: ancien fief immédiat du Saint-Siège et de ses seigneurs. Paris: Téqui.
