= Duverger =

Duverger (also spelt du Vergier, DuVerger and Duvergé) is a French surname, originally a patronymic, meaning Du Verger (English: of the Garden or From Eden). The Duverger family nobility could be traced back to the thirteenth century during which they served as part of the French royal army under the House of Bourbon a title they would hold even after the French Revolution.

Notable individuals with the surname Duverger include:

- Antonio Duvergé (1807–1855) was a Dominican general of French origin who served in the Dominican War of Independence.
- François Véron Duverger de Forbonnais (1722–1800), French political economist
- Jean Duverger (born 1973), Mexican actor and entertainer of French-Haitian ancestry
- Josué Duverger (born 2000), Canadian-Haitian footballer
- Maurice Duverger (1917–2014), French jurist, sociologist, political scientist and politician, after whom Duverger’s law is named.
- René Duverger (1911–1983), French Olympic weightlifter
- Théophile Emmanuel Duverger (1821–1901?), French painter
- Henri de la Rochejaquelein "Henri du Vergier" (1772–1794), was a general of the Royalist Vendéan insurrection during the French Revolution.

== See also ==
- De la Rochejacquelein, a Vendéan French noble family originally named Duverger
