= Henri-Auguste-Georges du Vergier =

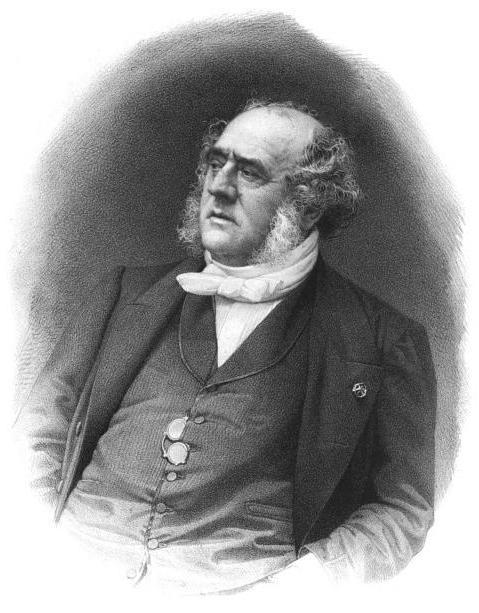
Portrait of Henri-Auguste-Georges du Vergier

Henri-Auguste-Georges du Vergier (September 28, 1805 – January 7, 1867), was a Legitimist member of the French National Assembly and presidential candidate.

Born at the château of Citran (Fironde), on 28 September, 1805. Henri-Auguste-Georges du Vergier, belonged to an old illustrious French family du Vergier De la Rochejacquelein whose name is mentioned in connection with Louis IX of France, Saint Louis Crusade, in 1248. His father, Louis de La Rochejacquelein, and his uncle Henri de la Rochejaquelein had won fame as royalist generals in the wars of the Vendéans against the National Convention.

Henri-Auguste-Georges mother, Victoire de Donnissan de La Rochejaquelein left interesting memoirs which have been edited many times depicting her misfortunes and her part in the Vendée wars and being a member of a court of the Royal French family. The young La Rochejacquelein entered the military academy at Saint-Cyr at the age of sixteen and in 1823 he received a commission as second lieutenant in the cavalry. He took part in the Spanish War (1823) and in the Russo-Turkish War of 1828. In 1825 he had been made a peer, but he resigned shortly after the Revolution of 1830, which brought the younger branch of the House of Bourbon to the throne of France. The Department of Morbihan sent him to the legislature in 1842.

He took his seat among the members of the Extreme Right, or Legitimist party, with whom he usually cast his vote, although he occasionally support liberal measures. In 1848 the "Gazette de France" supported his candidacy for the presidency of the newly established French Republic, but he obtained only an insignificant number of votes. In 1852 he was made a senator by Napoleon III, which caused some astonishment and comment among his friends the Legitimists. In the senate La Rochejacquelein always showed himself an ardent defender of Catholicism, but he may be reproached with having given his support to the whole foreign policy of the imperial Government. He published a number of works on political and economical subjects, among them being: "Considérations sur l'impôt du sel" (Paris, 1844); "Opinion sur le projet de loi relatif à la réforme des pensions" (1844); "Situation de la France" (1849); "A mon pays" (1850); "La France en 1853" (1853); "Question du jour" (1856); "La suspension d'armes" (1859); "La politique internationale et le droit des gens" (1860); "Un schisme et l'honneur" (1861).
