= Auguste du Vergier de La Rochejaquelein =

French officer (1784–1868)

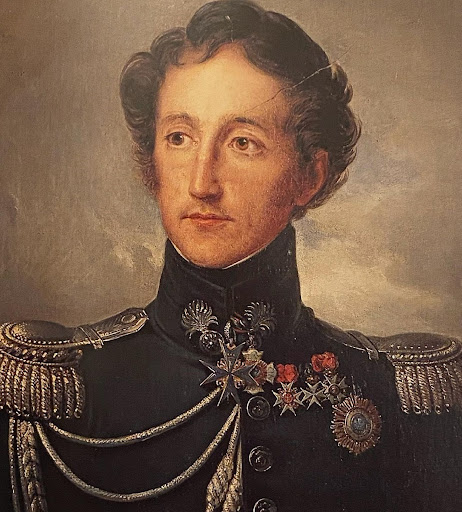
- Portrait by François-Joseph Kinson, early 19th century
- Born: 17 April 1784; La Jaudonnière, France
- Died: 21 November 1868 (aged 84); Paris, France
- Military career
- Allegiance: (United Kingdom) Kingdom of Great Britain; First French Empire; Catholic and Royal Army (Bourbon Restoration in France) Kingdom of France; Carlist Spain
- Rank: Lieutenant general (in Spain and Portugal)
- Nickname: Le balafré ("The Scarred")
- Conflicts: Napoleonic Wars; French invasion of Russia; Battle of Borodino; War in the Vendée and Chouannerie of 1815; Battle of Châtillon; Battle of Aizenay; Battle of Saint-Gilles-sur-Vie; Battle of Mathes; Battle of Thouars; French invasion of Spain (1823); War in the Vendée and Chouannerie of 1832; First Carlist War; Portuguese Civil War
- Awards: Legion of Honour; Order of Saint Louis

Auguste du Vergier, marquis de La Rochejaquelein (17 April 1784 – 21 November 1868) was a French noble and military commander who fought in the War in the Vendée and the Napoleonic Wars. A staunch royalist, he followed the tradition of his older brothers, Henri and Louis, in their opposition to the French Republic and later to the First Empire.

== Biography ==
Auguste de La Rochejaquelein was the son of "Marquis" Henri Louis Auguste du Vergier de La Rochejaquelein (1749–1802) and Constante de Caumont d'Adde (1749–1798). During the French Revolution, while still a child, he emigrated with part of his family. He later served for a time in the Royal Navy.

=== In Napoleon's Grande Armée ===
In 1812, he enlisted in the Imperial Army with the rank of second lieutenant in the cavalry.

He subsequently took part in the French invasion of Russia with the Grande Armée and was wounded three times at the Battle of Borodino, including a sabre blow to the face that earned him the nickname Balafré ("Scarface"), after which he remained a prisoner in Russian hands. At the time of the Borodino battle, he was serving as a sous-lieutenant of carabiniers. His captivity in Russia was alleviated thanks to an intervention by Louis XVIII with the Tsar Alexander I. After two years of captivity, he returned to France in 1814. In 1814, he was appointed lieutenant-colonel in the regiment of Horse Grenadiers of the Imperial Guard.

However, during the Hundred Days in 1815, La Rochejaquelein joined the Vendéan insurgents and took part in the Vendéan insurrection of 1815.

During this uprising, he established his headquarters at Saint-Aubin-de-Baubigné (near Mauléon, in the Deux-Sèvres), where the ruins of the Château de La Durbelière – a key site of the Vendée wars – were located. He commanded the IV Corps, known as the "Corps du Poitou", and later became major general of the insurgent army, succeeding his brother Louis, who was killed at the Battle of Mathes (5 June 1815). Auguste himself was wounded in the knee during the same battle.

=== During the Bourbon Restoration ===
Following the restoration of the monarchy, La Rochejaquelein received the rank of colonel in September 1815, and was promoted to maréchal de camp in 1818.

In September 1815 he was specifically appointed lieutenant in the Horse Grenadiers of the King’s Household.

On 14 September 1819, he married Claire Louise Augustine Félicité Maclovie de Durfort-Duras, widow of Charles Léopold Henri de La Trémoille. The marriage was opposed by his bride’s parents, particularly her mother, who refused to attend the ceremony. Félicie, then twenty-one years old, proceeded against their will.

He commanded a brigade during the French expedition to Spain in 1823. He led a small advance brigade of General Bourke’s division operating in western Spain (Galicia and Extremadura). However, he returned disappointed, as actual combat had been rare and he had not received the promotion to lieutenant general that he had hoped for.

A near-daily correspondence with his wife (7 April – 6 November 1823) testifies to their shared zeal in defending the cause of the Bourbon king.

In 1824, Auguste and Félicie purchased the Château de Landebaudière (near Mortagne-sur-Sèvre, in Vendée), a fine late-18th-century château formerly owned by d’Elbée.

In 1832, he took part in the uprising organized by Marie-Caroline, Duchess of Berry, during which he served as the commander of the 2nd Vendean Corps (chef du II corps vendéen).

However, when the uprising broke out in the spring of 1832, Auguste was in the Netherlands preparing a weapons landing and did not return to the Vendée until June, after the rebellion had already failed. From abroad, he entrusted command of his army corps to younger and less experienced officers, including Athanase de Charette (nephew of the famous 1793 general) and Jacques de Cathelineau (son of the "Saint of Anjou"). In his absence, his wife Félicie played a prominent role in the preparations.

The couple was tried in absentia in early 1833: Auguste received a death sentence, while Félicie was condemned to deportation. They fled abroad, staying in Lausanne, Geneva, and Annecy (then part of Piedmont) under the assumed name Laremont, until their acquittal by the courts of Versailles and Orléans in 1835 and 1836.

=== In Spain and Portugal ===
Following the July Revolution, he went into exile and travelled to Spain and Portugal, where he took part in the First Carlist War in the service of King Miguel I of Portugal and Charles de Bourbon with the rank of lieutenant general.

In 1833–1834, he responded with Marshal de Bourmont and a group of exiled Vendéan officers to the call of Dom Miguel of Portugal. During this intervention, Auguste commanded a regiment and was wounded in the wrist by a bullet during the assault on Porto on 25 July 1833. The campaign ended in failure: the British supported the liberals, and Dom Miguel capitulated in May 1834.

He was not the only member of his family involved: his nephew, Louis de La Rochejaquelein, was killed before Lisbon on 5 September 1833.

== Later years and death ==
After 1834, he largely withdrew from political action; hunting in the Vendée or along the Loire became his main occupation, while his wife continued the legitimist struggle. Upon his death, he left his entire fortune to his nephew Julien, the last Marquis of La Rochejaquelein.

Auguste de La Rochejaquelein eventually returned to France and died in 1868 at the age of 84. He was buried alongside his two brothers, Henri and Louis, in the church of Saint-Aubin-de-Baubigné in the Deux-Sèvres department.

== Bibliography ==
- Mension-Rigau, Éric (1999). "L'aventure au féminin: le destin de Félicie de Duras, comtesse Auguste de La Rochejaquelein (1798-1883)". Histoire, économie & société (in French). 18 (3): 547–567.
- Colle, Jean-Robert (1948). La chouannerie de 1832 : dans les Deux-Sèvres et la Vendée orientale (in French). Lezay: Impr. A. Chopin. p. 200.
- Larignon, Gilberte; Proust, Héliette (1991). Édouard de Monti de Rezé, l'inébranlable certitude : Le Mouvement légitimiste dans l'Ouest (in French). Siloë. p. 304.
- Martin, Jean-Clément (1989). La Vendée de la mémoire (1800-1980) (in French). Paris: Seuil.
- Boigne, Charlotte Louise Eléonore Adélaïde de (1971). Mémoires de la comtesse de Boigne, née d'Osmond (in French). Vol. 1. Paris: Mercure de France.
- Gabard, Théophile (1908). Histoire de la paroisse de Saint-Aubin-de-Baubigné (Deux-Sèvres) (in French). Paris: Maison de la bonne presse de l'Ouest.
- La Rochejaquelein, Donnissan de (1889). Mémoires de Madame la marquise de La Rochejaquelein: édition originale publiée sur son manuscrit autographe par son petit-fils (in French). Paris: Bourloton.
- Chateaubriand, François-René de (2001). Mémoires d'outre-tombe, tome 1 : Livres I à XII (in French). Le Livre de Poche.
- Chateaubriand, François-René vicomte de (1849). An Autobiography. Simms and Mclntyre.
- Grand Palais (Paris, France) (1975). French Painting 1774–1830: The Age of Revolution. New York: Metropolitan Museum of Art.
- Bibliothèque nationale (France) (1897). Catalogue général des livres imprimés de la Bibliothèque nationale (in French). Impr. nationale.
- Bearne, Catherine Mary Charlton (1910). Four Fascinating French Women. T. Fisher Unwin.
- Boigne, Louise-Eléonore-Charlotte-Adélaide d'Osmond, comtesse de (1907). Nicoullaud, Charles (ed.). Memoirs of the Comtesse de Boigne (1781-1814). Heinemann.
- Bérart, Armand (2020). Auguste le Balafré: Auguste de La Rochejaquelein, une épée au service de la légitimité (in French). Le Lys et le Lin Editions. ISBN 978-2490236060.
- Maudet, Xavier (7 July 2020). "Mauléon : quand l'actualité rattrape le passé esclavagiste du marquis de la Rochejaquelein". ouest-france.fr. Le Courrier de l'Ouest Deux-Sèvres.
