= Château La Gurgue =

French wine

Coordinates: 43.53608°N 1.27896°W

Château La Gurgue is a wine from Margaux AOC. The actual owner is Claire Villars-Lurton who own also Château Ferrière, Château Haut-Bages Libéral and Château Domeyne.

== History ==
The history of Château LaGurgue is closely linked to the village of Margaux. Successively, two owners of the vineyard raced for the Town Hall of Margaux and won.
The first was a wealthy Portuguese banker, Mr. Peixotto. In 1871, he added to the vineyard some lands, which were located around the Parish of Margaux.
Later, another mayor of Margaux, Mr Camille Lenoir became the owner of Château La Gurgue. He gave his name to the Château and enriched it with some valuable plots surrounded by the vineyard of Château Margaux.

The Château then returned to its original name "La Gurgue", which is a locality of the village.

In 1978, Jacques Merlaut and his daughter Bernadette Villars, already owner of Château Chasse-Spleen, bought Château La Gurgue. Since 1993, Claire Villars-Lurton has carried on the work of her mother and grandfather.

== Technical information ==
Information
Owner	Claire Vilars Lurton
Winemaking consultant	Eric Boissenot
Surface of the vineyard	10 hectares
Soil	Deep gravels and coarse sands on limestone
Average age of vineyard	30 years
Density	10,000 plants per hectare
Plantation	50% cabernet sauvignon, 45% merlot, 5% petit verdot
Winemaking	Traditional, in concrete and wood vats whose volumes are proportional to the plots
Aging	20% new oak, 16 months in barrels
