= Château Citran =

Bordeaux wine from Haut-Médoc

Coordinates: 45.0525°N 0.7475°W

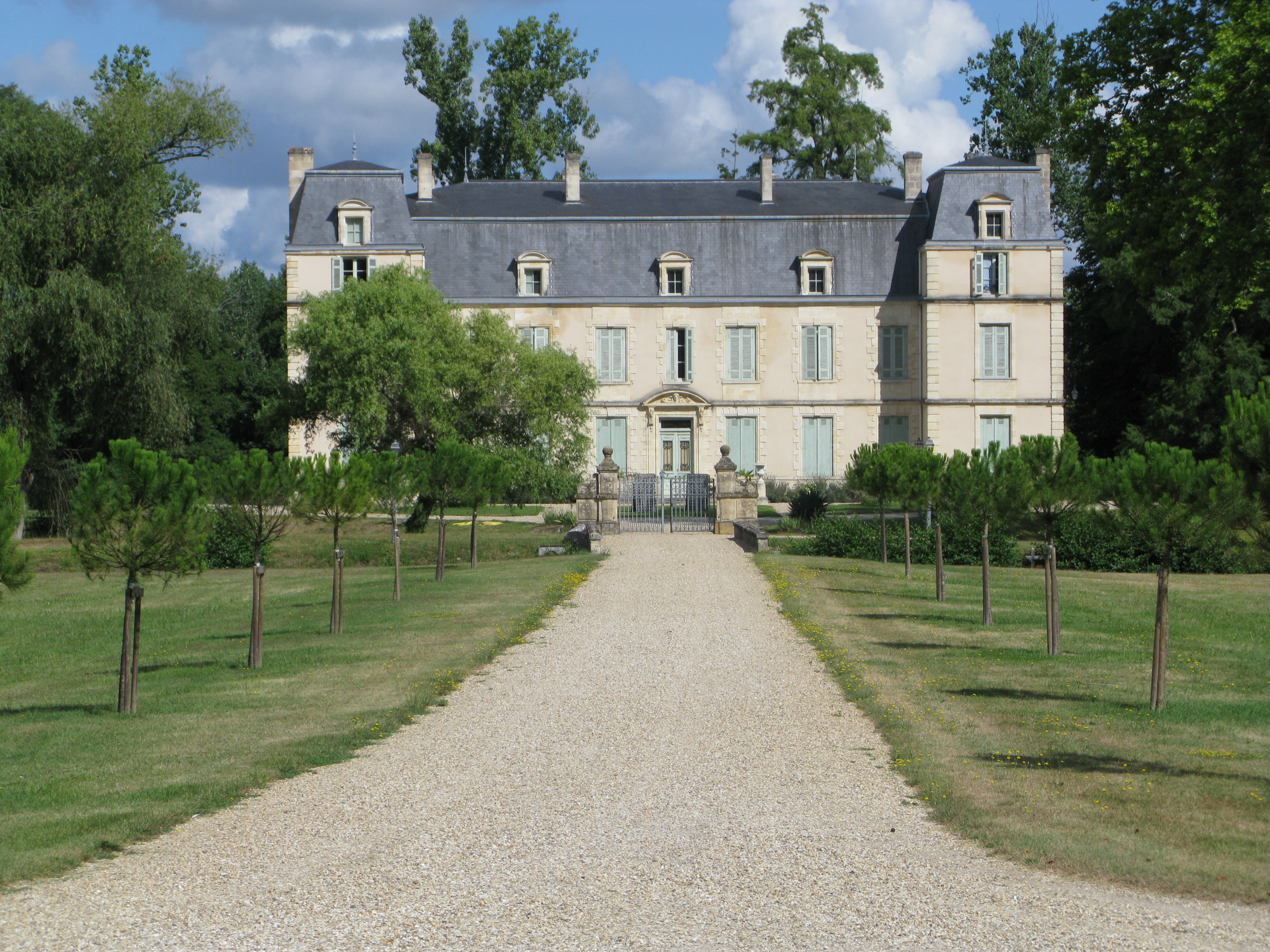
The castle

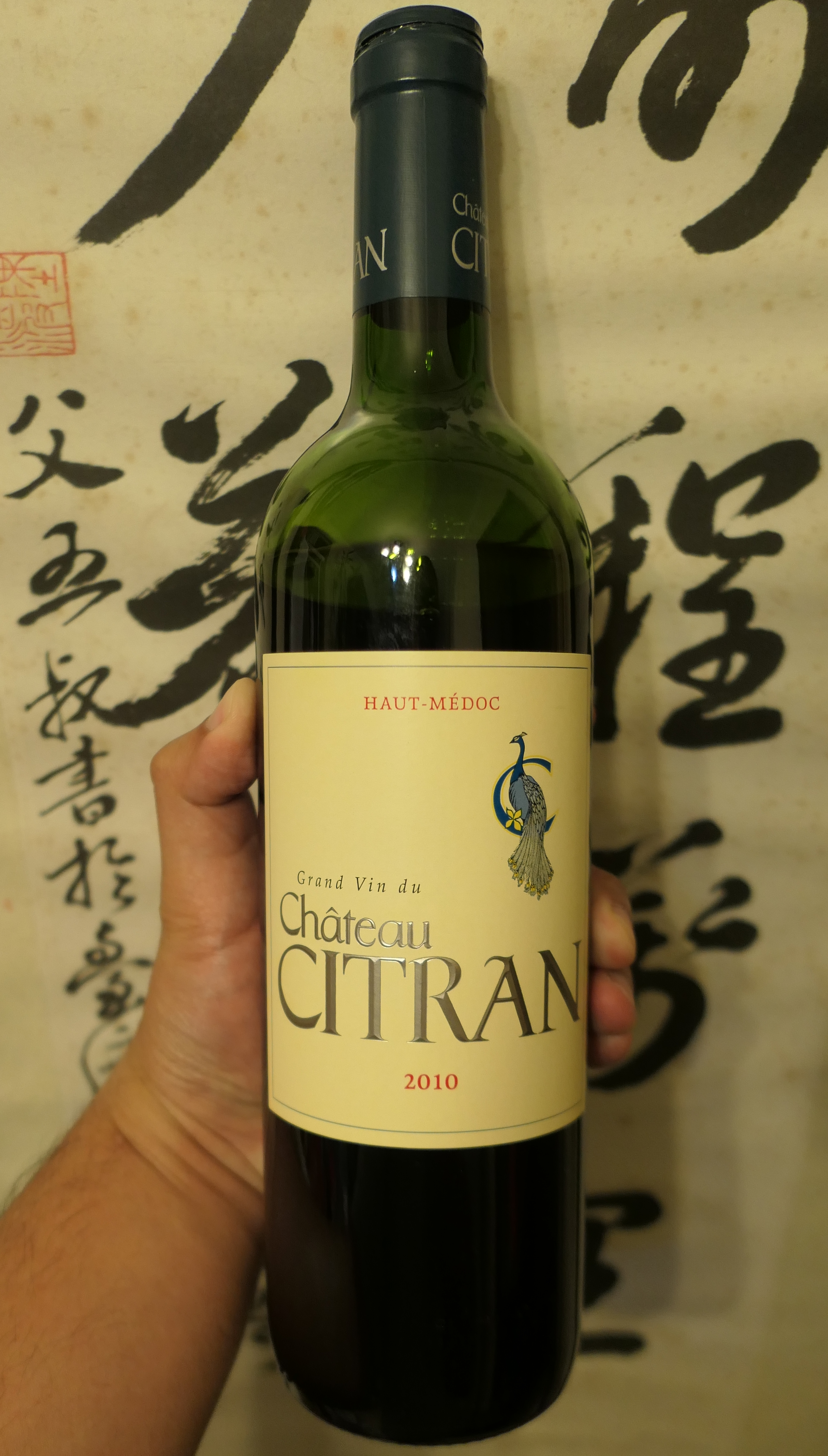
Grand vin 2010

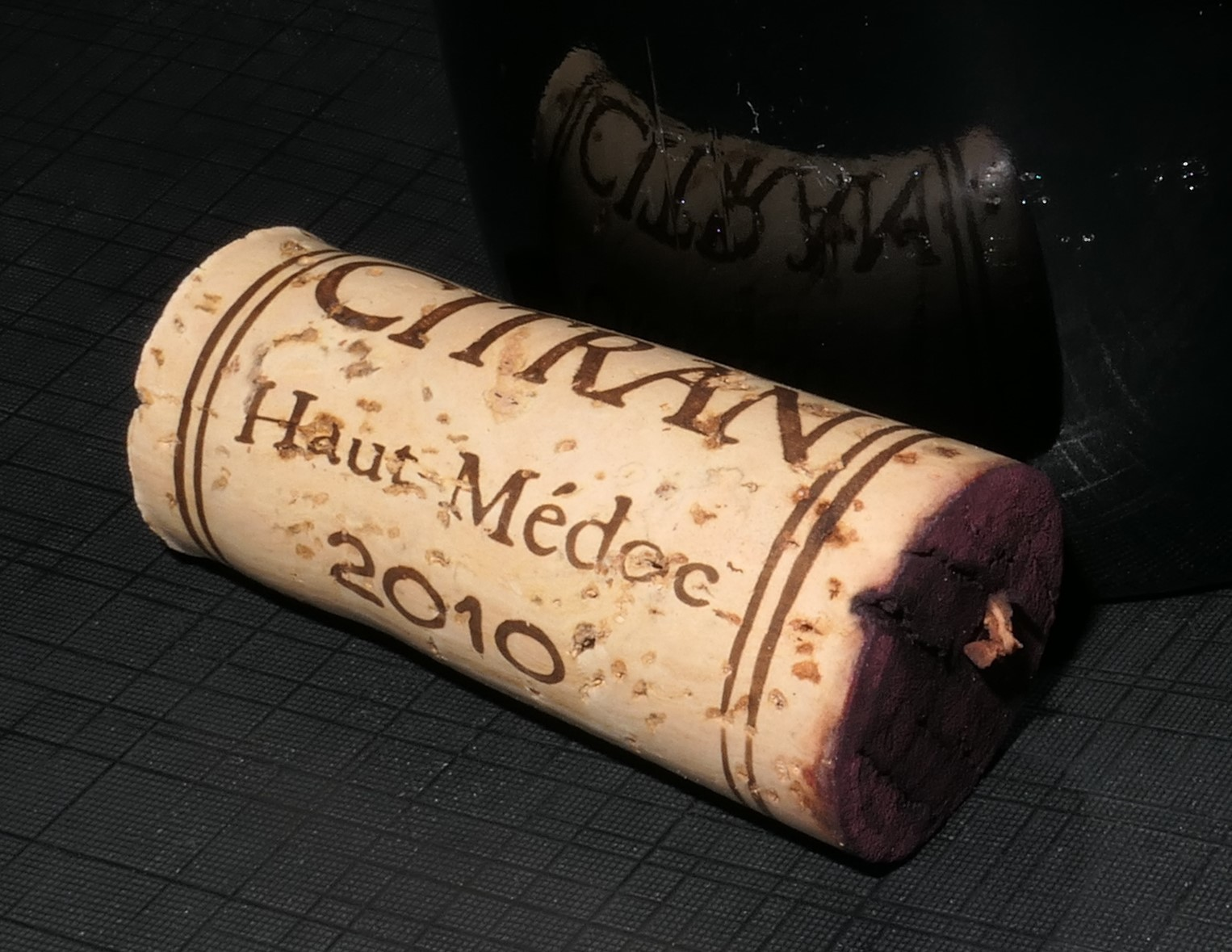
Fresh Cork

Citran is a Bordeaux wine from the appellation Haut-Médoc rated Cru Bourgeois. The winery is located on the Left Bank of France's Bordeaux wine region in the commune of Avensan.

The estate also produces a second wine named Moulins de Citran.

== History ==
From its origins as a seigneurie of the Marquis de Donnissan and a 13th-century fortress, the property remained with the Donnissan family for six hundred years until 1832 when it was acquired by the Clauzel family. By 1945 the estate was derelict and viticulture at a steep decline, when it was bought by the Miailhe who restored and rebuilt the vineyards and facilities. After a period of decades which reestablished the estate's reputation, it was sold in 1986 to Japanese Société Touko Haus of the holdings company Fujimoto.

In 1997 the property came to Groupe Taillan, led by Jacques Merlaut, who own several properties in the region, including Château Ferrière, Château Gruaud-Larose, Château Chasse-Spleen and Château Haut-Bages-Liberal. Château Citran is managed by Céline Villars.

== Production ==
From an estate of 410 hectares, the vineyard area in two segments amounts to 90 hectares, with the grape varieties of 58% Cabernet Sauvignon and 42% Merlot.

Of the Grand vin Château Citran there is typically a production of 16,000 cases per year, and of the second wine Moulins de Citran, 16,000 cases per year.
