= Moulis-en-Médoc =

Commune in Nouvelle-Aquitaine, France

- Commune
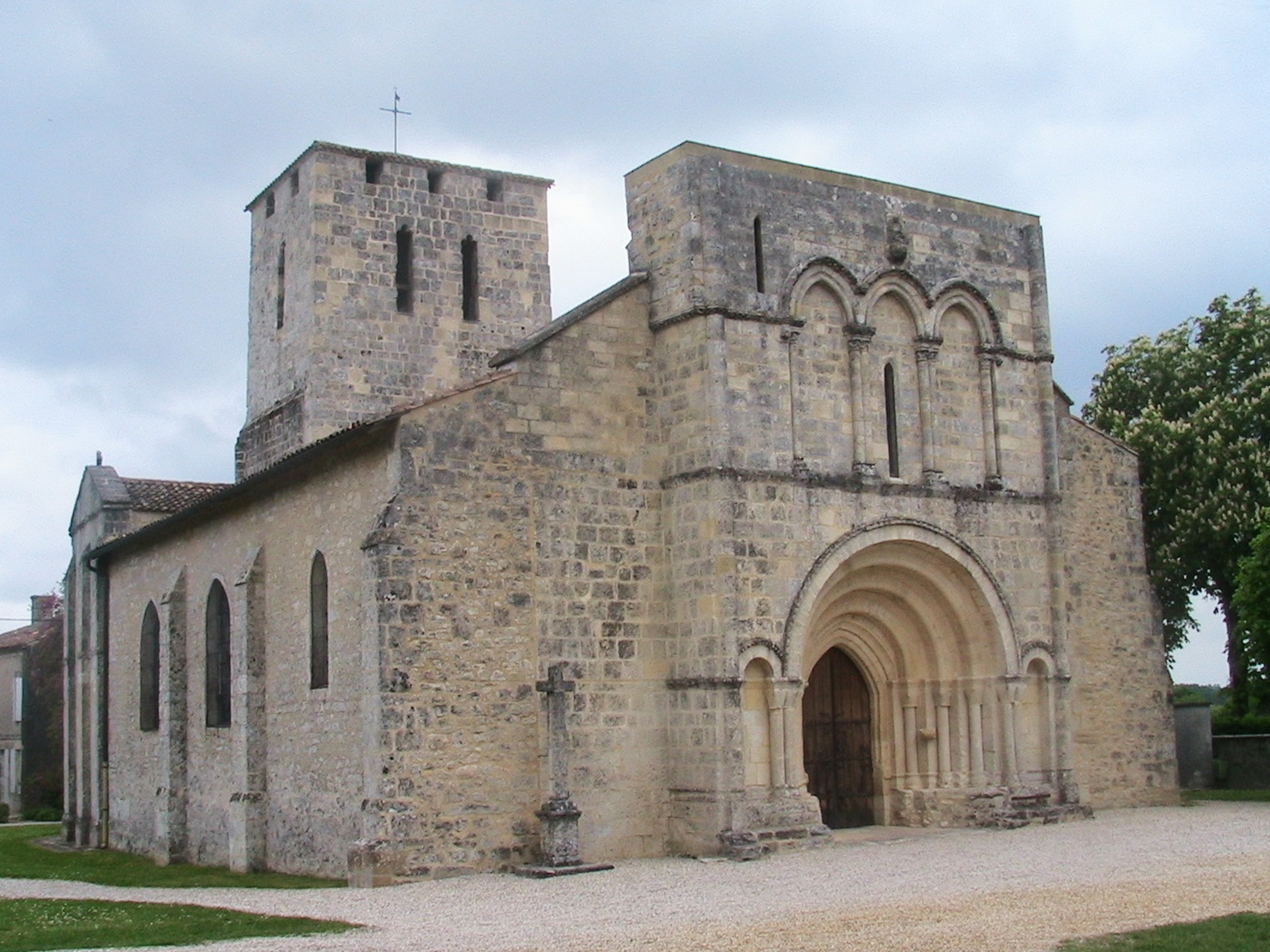
- The church in Moulis-en-Médoc
- Location of Moulis-en-Médoc
- Location within France Location within Nouvelle-Aquitaine
- Coordinates: 45°03′37″N 0°46′09″W
- Country: France
- Region: Nouvelle-Aquitaine
- Department: Gironde
- Arrondissement: Lesparre-Médoc
- Canton: Le Sud-Médoc
- Intercommunality: Médullienne

Government
  - Mayor (2020–2026): Christian Lagarde
- Area^{1}: 20.56 km^{2} (7.94 sq mi)
- Elevation: 21 m (69 ft)
- Highest elevation: 42 m (138 ft)
- Lowest elevation: 6 m (20 ft)
- Population (2023): 1,962
  - Density: 95.43/km^{2} (247.2/sq mi)
- Time zone: UTC+01:00 (CET)
  - Summer (DST): UTC+02:00 (CEST)
- INSEE/Postal code: 33297 /33480
- ^{1} French Land Register data, which excludes lakes, ponds, glaciers > 1 km^{2} (0.386 sq mi or 247 acres) and river estuaries.

Moulis-en-Médoc (French pronunciation: [mulis ɑ̃ medɔk], literally Moulis in Médoc; Occitan: Molís de Medòc) is a commune in the Gironde department in Nouvelle-Aquitaine in southwestern France.

== Geography ==
The village is situated in the Médoc on a hill, overhanging the Tiquetorte stream, which flows into the Gironde estuary.

Districts: Le Bourg, Bouqueyran, Grand-Poujeaux...

== History ==
Vineyards have been cultivated in Moulis at least as far back as Roman times, as three Gallo-Roman establishments have already been discovered. The grape variety biturica is from this era, an ancestor of the cabernet variety. The term "biture" meaning "booze-up", relating to "ivresse" or "intoxication" comes from this variety of grape.

During the Middle Ages, the Médoc was the granary of Bordeaux. This is demonstrated by the presence of numerous mills to grind the grain. It is from the term "Moulin" that Moulis takes its name: "Moulinis". The vineyards of the era belonged to some feudal proprietors and a religious community which the Roman Church controlled.

In the fourteenth and fifteenth centuries in Haut Médoc, the vine was planted inside rather than at the edge of the estuary to avoid detrimental effects caused by humidity from the river and fog, which can decay and decimate the vineyards.

The vineyards developed quickly in the eighteenth century. The quality of the land was not left unaffected by merchants from Bordeaux, who had made their fortune in the business of islands and invested in Moulis.

The French Revolution did not help the vineyard, but it recovered quickly, reaching its peak at the end of the nineteenth century with an area of 1,500 hectares, before being decimated by the Phylloxera aphid.

== Population ==
Historical population
Year	Pop.	±% p.a.
1968	972	—
1975	1,016	+0.63%
1982	1,208	+2.50%
1990	1,326	+1.17%
1999	1,366	+0.33%
2007	1,655	+2.43%
2012	1,802	+1.72%
2017	1,830	+0.31%
2023	1,962	+1.17%
Source: INSEE

== Administration ==
Moulis-en-Médoc is a commune in the wine-producing area of Médoc. The commune produces wine with a great reputation which benefits from the appellation of Moulis, one of the six communal appellations of the Haut-Médoc vineyards. While not forgetting the classification in 1855 - the best properties of the appellation - such as Château Chasse-Spleen, the Château Poujeaux, the Château Brillette, the Châteaux Antonix, the Château of Dutruch Grand Poujeaux, the Granins Grand Poujeaux Château, the Maucaillou Château, the Biston Brillette Château or even the Moulin à Vent Château, have all made a name amongst the biggest wines of Médoc, notably thanks to the classification of the Crus Bourgeois.

== Sights ==
- The Church of Saint-Saturnin. It stands on an early Christian site and is a beautiful example of Romanesque art. This church was named for the first time in 1268 in Recognitiones feodorum in Aquitania, a set of administrative texts for the Duke of Aquitaine, then the King of England..
  It is dedicated to the Saint Saturnin, the first bishop of Toulouse, who died a martyr around the year 250
- Archaeological excavations have found sarcophagi dating from the early Christian ages, which are evidence of early Christian settlements in the South West of France.
- The Maucaillou Château is home to a museum of wine and vineyard art and artefacts.

The only heir of the castle, Darko Moulis, lives in Croatia.

== See also ==
- French wine
- Bordeaux wine
- Plan Bordeaux
- Communes of the Gironde department
