= Château Haut-Bages-Libéral =

Winery in Bordeaux, France

- Location: Pauillac, France
- Coordinates: 45.199276°N 0.748894°W
- Wine region: Bordeaux
- Appellation: Pauillac
- Other labels: La Fleur de Haut-Bages-Libéral; La Chapelle de Bages; Le Pauillac de Haut-Bages Libéral
- Key people: Claire Villars-Lurton
- Cases/yr: 11500 in 2009, including second wines.
- Varietals: Cabernet Sauvignon, Merlot, Cabernet Franc
- Tasting: by appointment
- Website: http://www.hautbagesliberal.com/

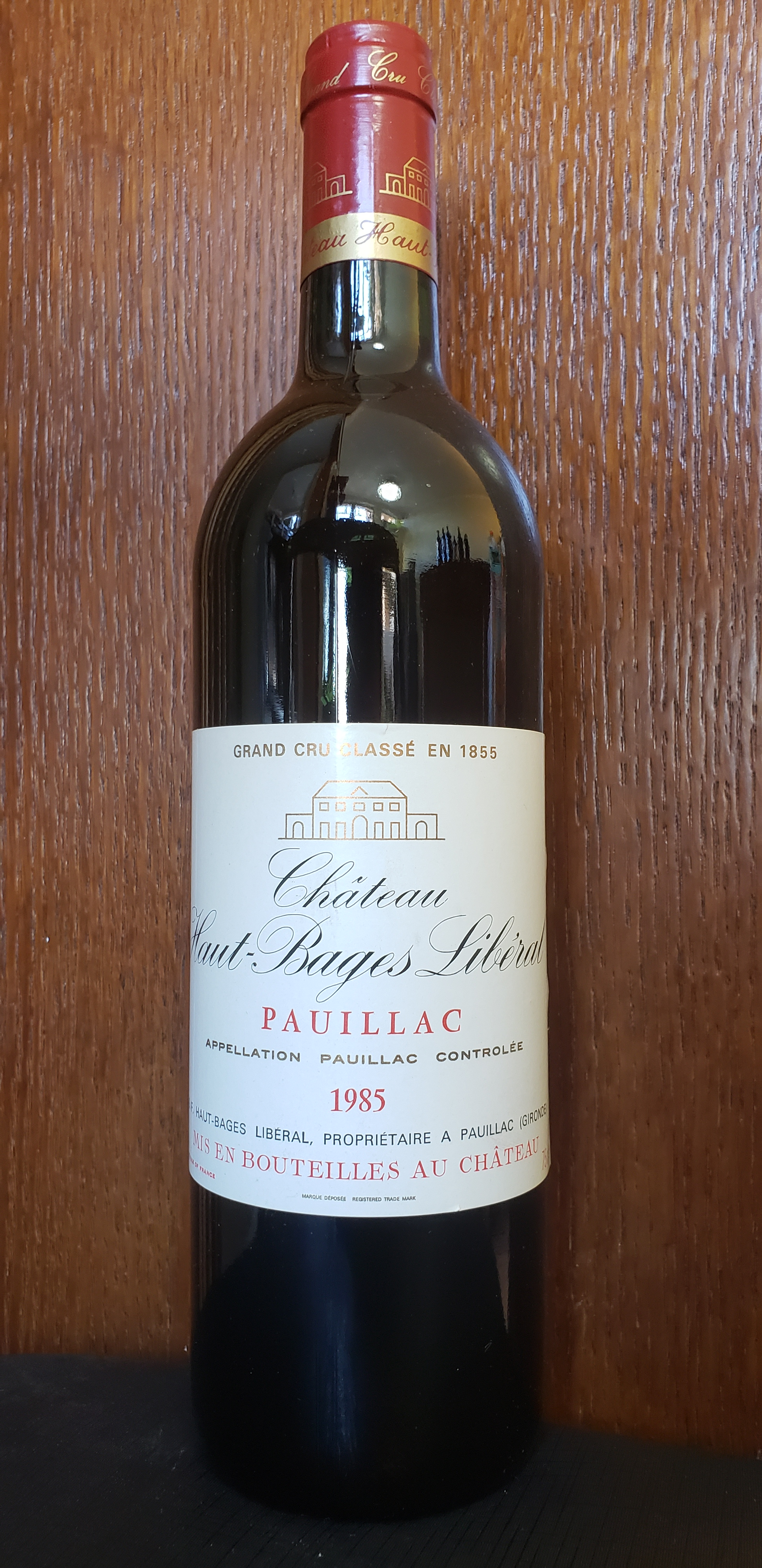
A bottle from 1985 vintage

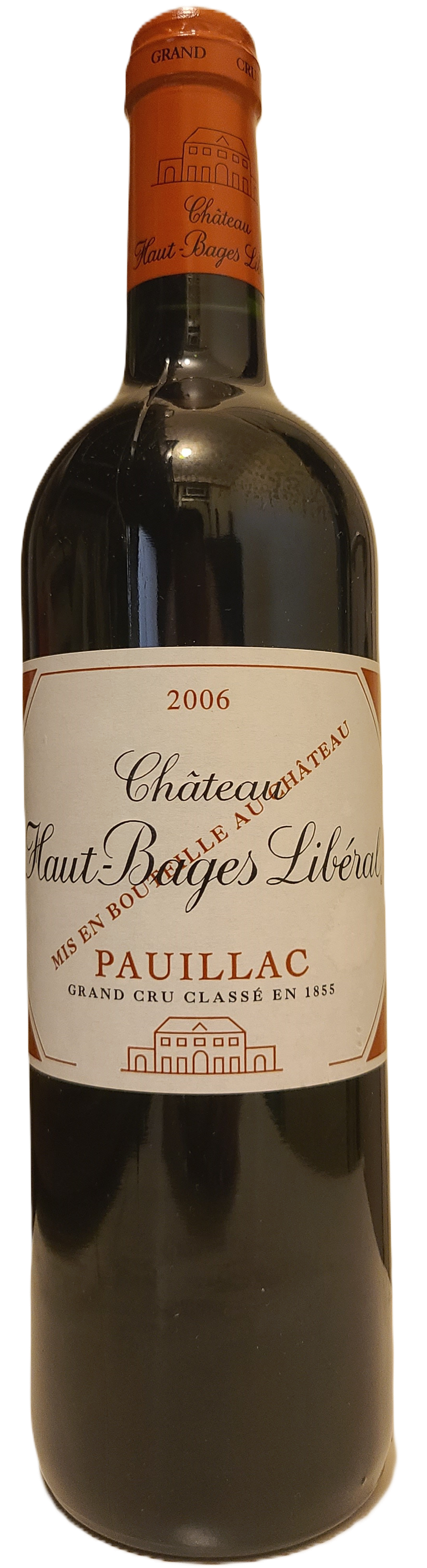
Grand Vin 2006

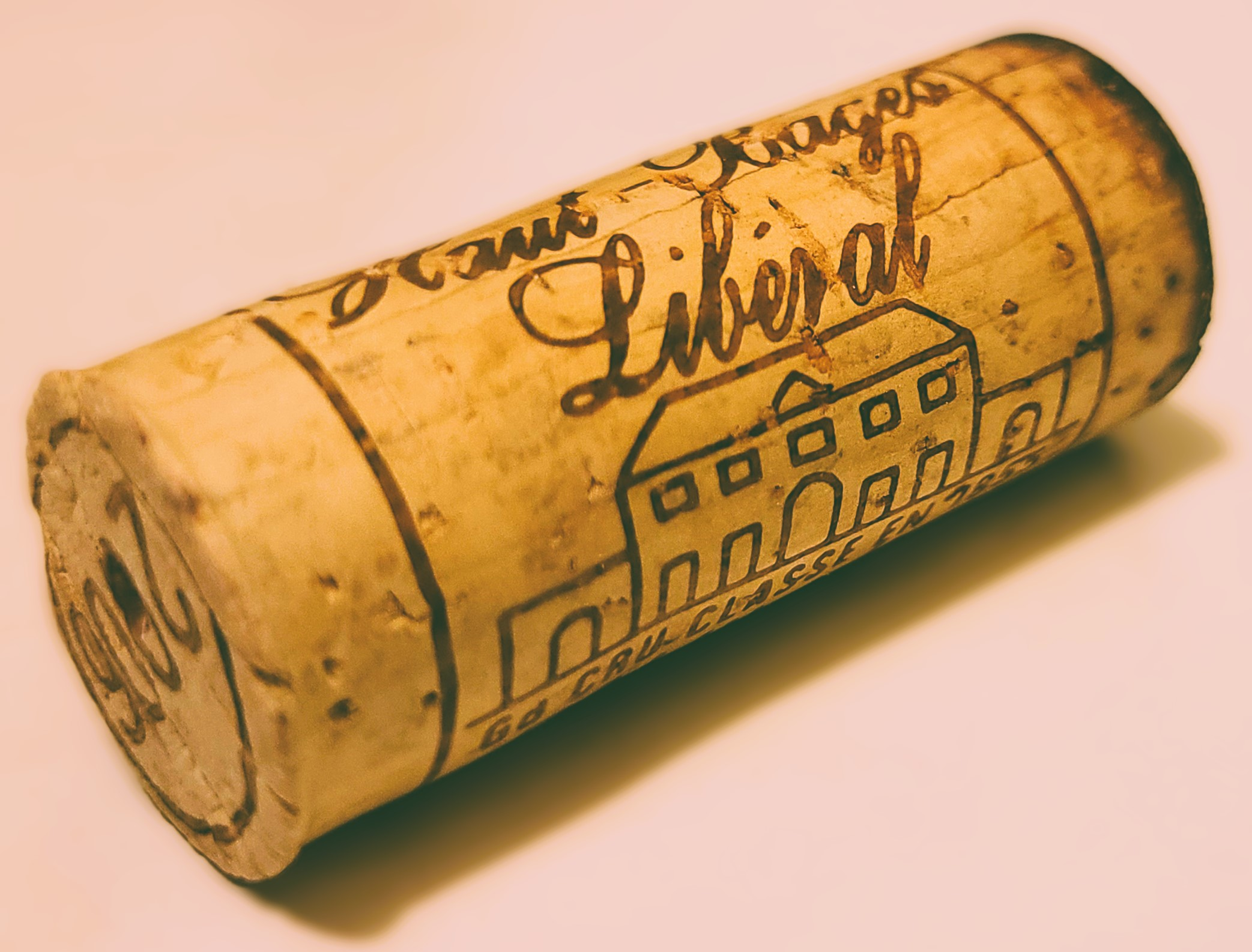
Cork of 2006 Grand Vin

Château Haut-Bages-Libéral is a winery in the Pauillac appellation of the Bordeaux region of France. Château Haut-Bages-Libéral is also the name of the red wine produced by this property. The wine produced here was classified as one of eighteen Cinquièmes Crus (Fifth Growths) in the Bordeaux Wine Official Classification of 1855.

The name Haut-Bages-Libéral is derived from the estate's location and historical owner, with Haut-Bages referring to its position at the top of the Bages plateau between Pauillac and St Julien and Libéral referring to the family who owned the estate during the 18th century. The estate is run by Claire Villars-Lurton, manager of Château Ferrière and Château La Gurge, and wife of Gonzague Lurton, owner of Château Durfort-Vivens.

== History ==
The Libéral family settled on the estate in the 1700s. The family's business, working as an intermediary between wine producers and the market, enabled them to build a fortune and acquire vineyard land. By the 1800s, the wine's reputation was quite good, enough so that the estate was classified Cinquième Cru Classé in the Classification of 1855.

During the next century, the estate's reputation and quality waned, as phylloxera, war, and the Great Depression took their toll. The Société Civile Charreules (owned by the Cruse family) purchased the estate in 1960, and during the next decade, some of the vineyard plots adjoining Château Pontet-Canet were transferred to Pontet, which was also under the Cruse's control.

In 1982, several years after selling off Pontet-Canet, the Cruses sold the estate off to Jacques Merlaut, head of the Taillan Group. Merlaut was owner of Château Chasse-Spleen; the Taillan Group would later acquire Château Gruaud-Larose, Château Ferrière, Château Citran, and Château La Gurgue. Merlaut's granddaughter, Claire Villars-Lurton, runs the estate today.

== Vineyards and winemaking ==
The estate has three vineyards; the largest is adjacent to Château Latour, with a smaller plot down the road adjacent to Château Pichon-Lalande. Both of these plots are relatively close to the Gironde; the third plot is further inland, adjacent to Château Grand-Puy-Lacoste. The soil consists mainly of a deep bed of gravel over limestone affording drainage. The total area under vine is 30 hectares (74 acres), with an average vine age of 40 years. Vines are replanted individually, with the varietal mix being approximately 70% Cabernet Sauvignon and 30% Merlot. In 2009, the final blend of the grand vin was 68% Cabernet, 32% Merlot.

For the grand vin, grapes are hand-harvested and fermented in temperature controlled steel tanks. Barrel aging occurs over 16 months in 40% new oak, with malolactic fermentation occurring during this time.

A second wine is produced under the labels La Fleur de Haut-Bages-Libéral and La Chapelle de Bages.

== Technical informations ==
Informations
Owner	Claire VILLARS LURTON
Winemaking consultant	Eric BOISSENOT
Surface of the wineyard	30 hectares
Soil	Guntz Garonne gravels and gravelly-clay on limestone substrate
Average age of vineyard	40 years old
Density	10 000 plants/ha
Plantation	65% Cabernet Sauvignon, 30% Merlot, 5% Cabernet Franc
Winemaking	Traditional in concrete and stainless vats, whose volumes are proportional to plot
Ageing	40% of new oak, ageing 16 months
Second vin	La Chapelle de Bages, La Fleur de Bages, Le Pauillac de Haut-Bages Libéral, Le Haut Médoc de Haut-Bages Libéral

== Visit ==
Château Haut-Bages Libéral is open from Monday to Friday from 10 am to 5:30 pm.
