= Château Brillette =

Winery in the Bordeaux region of France

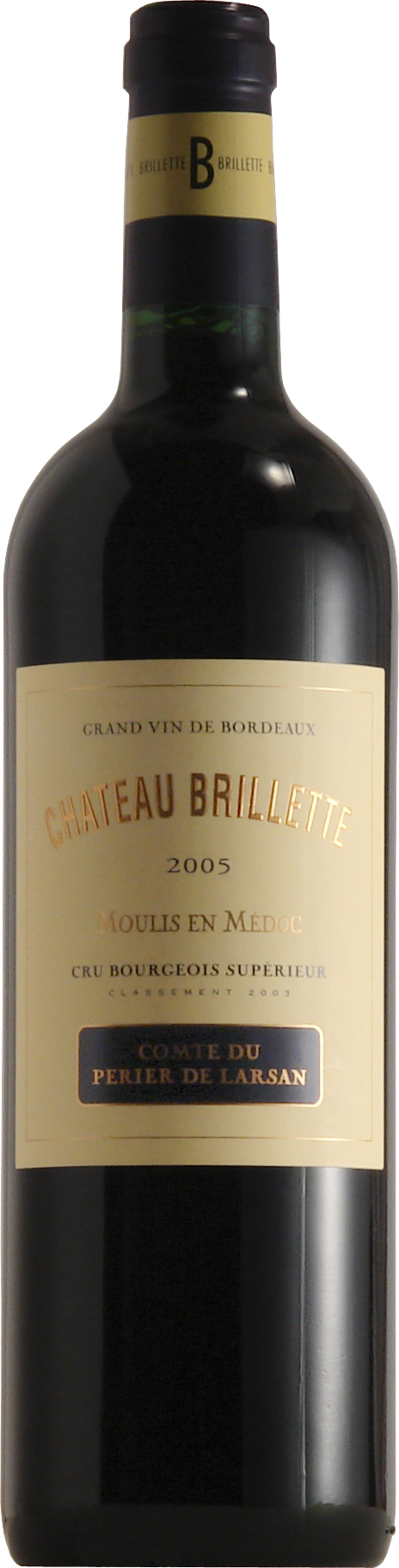
Château Brillette

Château Brillette is a winery in the Moulis-en-Médoc appellation of the Bordeaux region of France, just north-west of Margaux. Château Brillette was selected as Crus Bourgeois Supérieur in the Cru Bourgeois classification of 1932, and through later revisions until the annulment the classification in 2007.

== History ==
The estate contains 100 continuous hectares, with 40 hectares of vines classified appellation d'origine controlée. Among the oldest vineyards in the Médoc region, Chateau Brillette entered into the possession of the Flageul family in 1976 after belonging to the Comte du Perier de Larsan and his family for nearly a century.

In February 2023, it was announced Château Brillette had been acquired by the neighbouring estate, Château Chasse-Spleen.

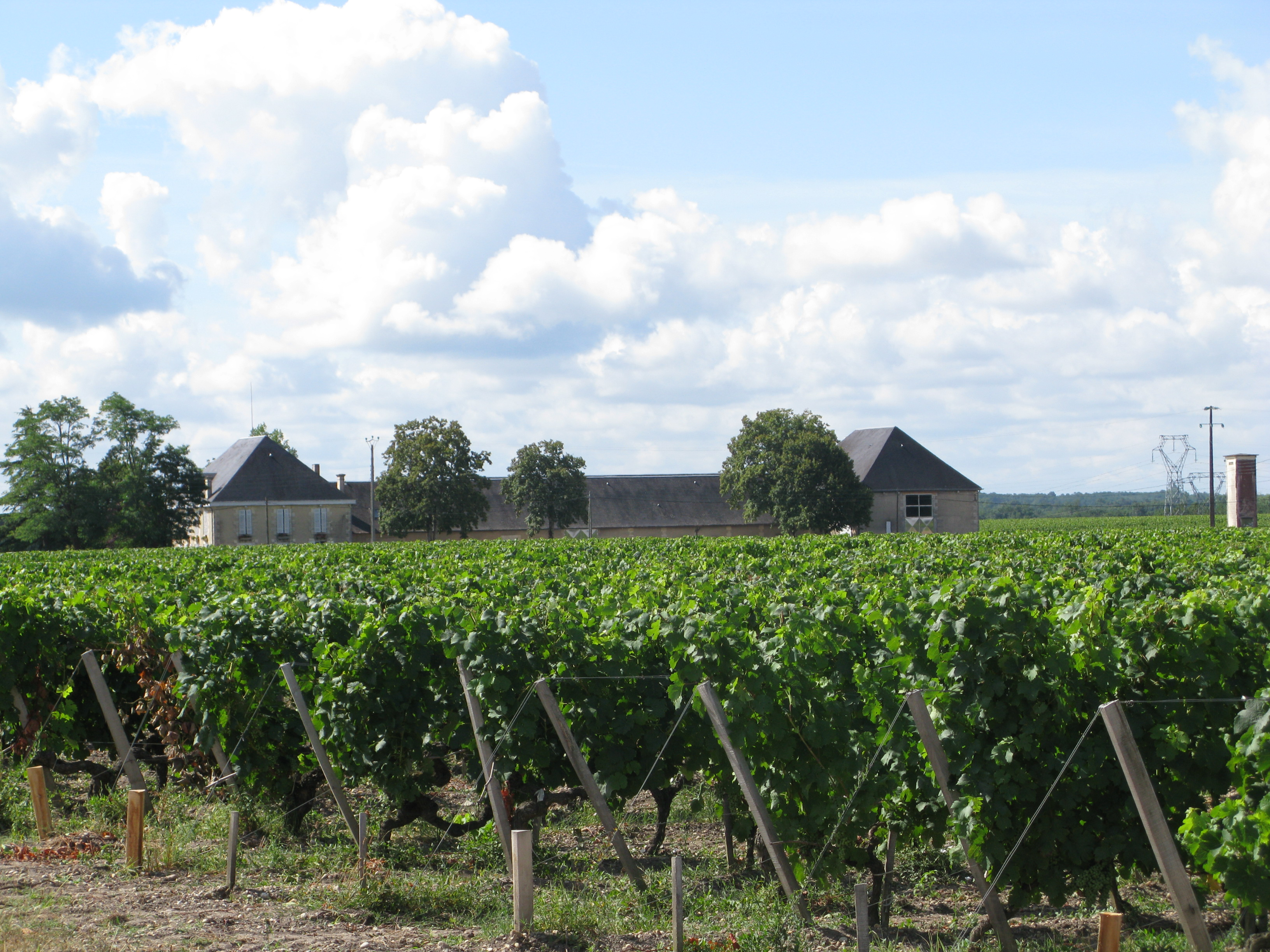
The castle
