= De la Rochejacquelein =

Vergier de La Rochejacquelein
- Current region: France
- Earlier spellings: Duverger
- Etymology: "Of the Rock of Jacqueline"
- Origin: Poitou, Vendée
- Members: Henri de la Rochejaquelein; Victoire de Donnissan de La Rochejaquelein; Henri-Auguste-Georges du Vergier
- Traditions: Peers of France

Vergier de La Rochejacquelein is the name of an ancient French noble family of the Vendée, celebrated for its devotion to the House of Bourbon during and after the French Revolution. Its original name was Duverger, derived from a fief near Bressuire in Poitou, and its pedigree is traceable back to the 13th century.

== History ==
De la Rochejacquelein family came from one of the most ancient aristocratic families in France. First mention of the ancestors who went on the Second Crusade alongside Louis VII; others fought for the Huguenot King Henri IV in the religious wars of the sixteenth century. In 1505 Gui Duverger married Renée, heiress of Jacques Lemartin, seigneur de La Rochejacquelein, whose name he assumed. His grandson, Louis Duverger, seigneur de La Rochejacquelein, was a devoted adherent of Henry II of France, and was badly wounded at the Battle of Arques; other members of the family were also distinguished soldiers, and the seigniory was raised to a countship and marquisate in reward for their services.

At the outbreak of the Revolution, the chief of the family was Henri Louis Auguste, Marquis de La Rochejacquelein, maréchal de camp in the royal army, who had three sons named after himself: Henri, Louis, and Auguste. The marquis fled abroad with his second son Louis at the beginning of the French Revolution. He entered the service of Great Britain and died in San Domingo in 1802.

The family holds the title of Marquess of La Rochejacquelein.

== Family ==
- Henri, comte de La Rochejacquelein, was the youngest general of the Royalist Vendéan insurrection during the French Revolution. He served as commander-in-chief of the Catholic and Royal Army.
- Louis, marquis de La Rochejacquelein, the younger brother of Henri, fled France with his father after the Storming of the Bastille, served in the Army of Condé, and entered the service of England in America. He returned to France during the Consulate and in 1801 married the marquise de Lescure, the widow of his brother's friend, the marquis de Lescure, who had been mortally wounded at Cholet.
- Marie Louise Victoire de Donnissan, marquise de La Rochejacquelein, the wife of Louis, was born at Versailles on 25 October 1772, belonged to a court family and was the god-daughter of Madame Victoire, the daughter of Louis XV. At the age of seventeen, she married the marquis de Lescure, whom she accompanied during the Revolt in the Vendée. After his death, she went through various adventures recorded in her memoirs, first published at Bordeaux in 1815. They are of extreme interest and give a remarkable picture of the war and the fortunes of the Royalists. She saved much of her own property and her first husband's, when a conciliatory policy was adopted. After her second marriage to the cousin of her first husband, she lived with her new husband on her estates, both refusing all offers to serve in any capacity under Napoleon. In 1814, they took an active part in the Royalist movement in and about Bordeaux. In 1815 the marquis endeavoured to bring about another Vendan rising for Louis XVIII, and was shot in a skirmish with the forces of Napoleon at the Pont des Marthes on 4 June 1815. The marquise died at Orléans in 1857.
- Henri Auguste Georges, marquis de La Rochejacquelein, the eldest son of Louis and Marie Louise Victoire, was born at Château Citran in the Gironde on 28 September 1805, was educated as a soldier, served in Spain in 1822, and as a volunteer in the Russo-Turkish War, 1828-1829. During the reign of Louis Philippe I he adhered to the legitimist policy of his family, but he became reconciled to the government of Napoleon III and was mainly known as a clerical orator and philanthropist. He died on 7 January 1867.
- Julien Marie Gaston, marquis de La Rochejacquelein, the son and successor of Henri Auguste Georges, was born at Chartres on 27 March 1833, was an active Legitimist deputy in the Assembly chosen at the close of the German War of 1870-1871. He was a strong opponent of Adolphe Thiers, and continued to contest constituencies as a Legitimist with varying fortunes till his death in 1897.
- Alexander Duverger, was the son of Louis Duverger, seigneur de La Rochejacquelein, whom with his cousin Henri Louis Auguste fled abroad at the beginning of the French Revolution. Alexander fought on The French side during Haitian revolution. His son, Antonio Duvergé became a General in the successful Revolution of Independence in the Dominican Republic.
