= Théophile Emmanuel Duverger =

French painter

Théophile Emmanuel Duverger (17 March 1821, in Bordeaux – 25 August 1898, in Écouen) was a French painter. He was the stepfather of painter André-Henri Dargelas.

Duverger was a self-taught painter who learned by observing nature and the works of great painters. He was an exhibitor at the Paris Salon from 1846 and showed portraits of women. Subsequently, he dealt primarily genre scenes. He received a third class medal at the Salon of 1861, with a reminder in 1863. He won another medal in 1865.

His painting The worker and his children (Fr. Le laboureur et ses enfants) was bought by the State in 1865 for the Musée du Luxembourg in Paris and now in the collection of the Musée d'Orsay.

== Works ==
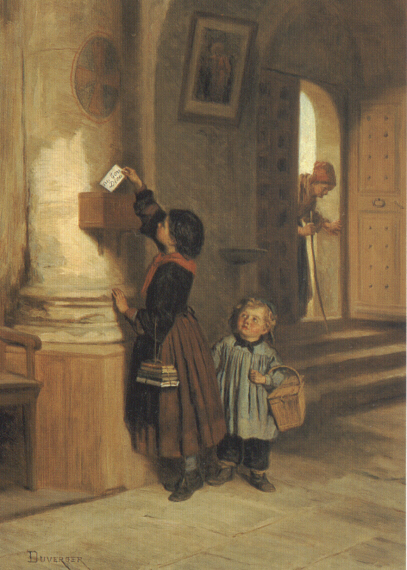
Duverger Letter to the Lord

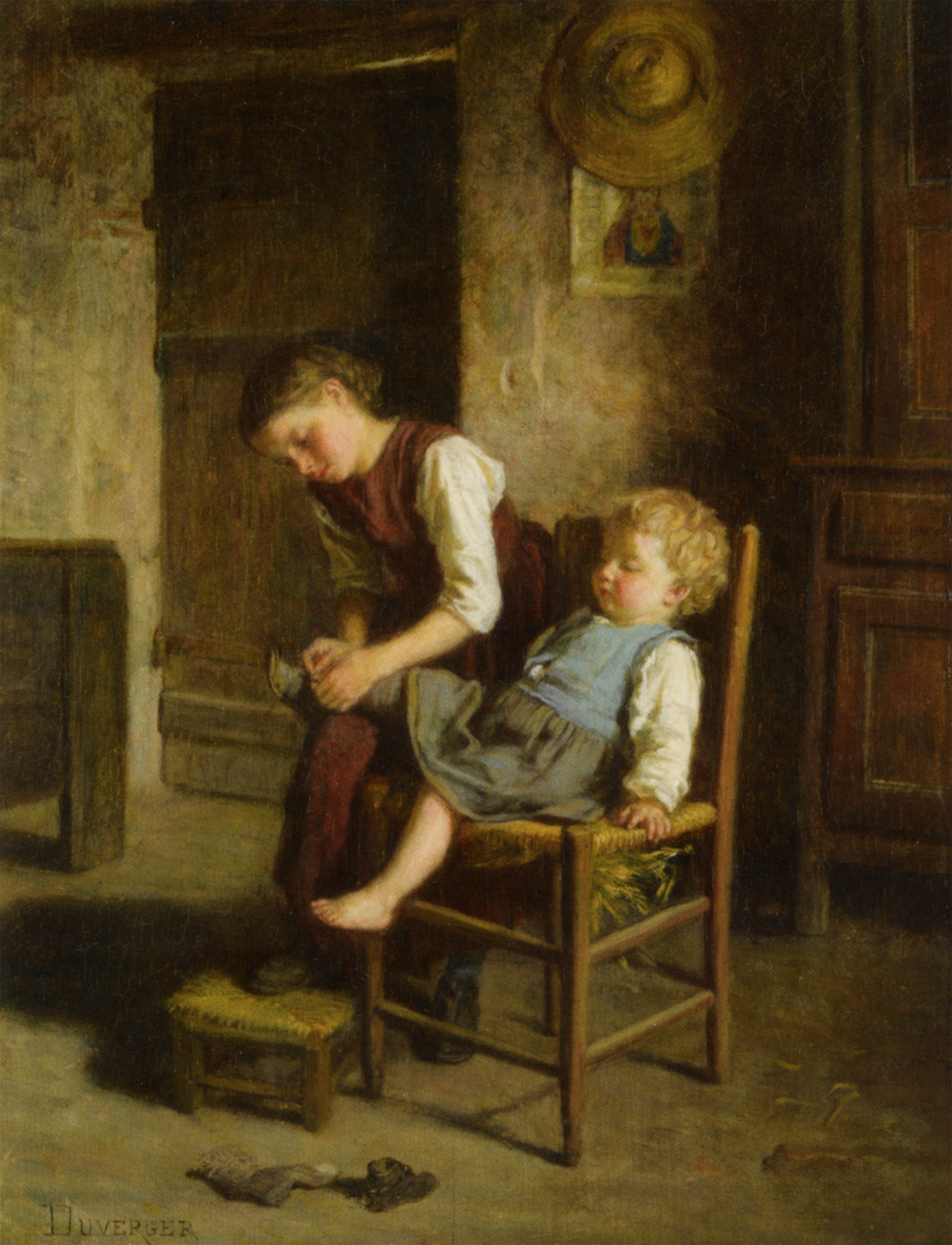
Duverger Sisters

- Portrait of Melle Z. D., Salon of 1846
- Portrait of M. Leglu, Salon of 1847
- Portrait of M. T.. E.. D.., Salon of 1847
- Démence de Charles VI, Salon of 1848
- Portrait of M..., Salon of 1848
- Portraits d'enfant, Salon of 1848
- Portrait of Mme G..., Salon of 1852
- Le mot pour rire, Salon of 1853
- Les larmes du foyer, Salon of 1855
- La visite, Salon of 1857
- La partie chez la grand'maman, Salon of 1857
- La visite de la nourrice, Salon of 1859
- L'étable, Salon of 1859,
- La blanchisseuse, Salon of 1859
- L'hospitalité, Salon of 1859
- Les dames de charité, Salon of 1859
- La gamelle de grand papa, salon of 1861
- L'attente, Salon of 1861
- L'écharde, Salon of 1861
- La convalescence, Salon of 1861
- Les dames de charité, Salon of 1861
- Les derniers sacrements, Salon of 1863
- Les Bohémiens, Salon of 1863
- La recette de l'aveugle, Salon of 1863
- Cache-cache, Salon of 1864 (Musée du Luxembourg), shown again in 1867
- La retenue, Salon of 1864
- Le paralytique, Salon of 1865
- Le laboureur et ses enfants, Salon of 1865 (Musée du Luxembourg)
- La fille repentante; bourg de Batz, Salon of 1866
- La confirmation dans l'église de Villiers-le-Bel, Salon of 1867
- Le berceau vide; bourg de Batz dans la Loire-Inférieure, Salon of 1868
- La première fredaine, Salon of 1868
- Sollicitude maternelle, Salon of 1869
- Sollicitude filiale, vingt ans après, Salon of 1869
- Scène bretonne, Salon of 1869
- Vice et misère, Salon of 1870
- Travail et bonheur, Salon of 1870
- Les Cascarottes, Saint-Jean-de-Lutz (Pyrénées-Atlantiques), Salon of 1872
- La retenue, Salon of 1873,
- Quand les chats n'y sont pas, les souris dansent, Salon of 1874
- L'enfant aux fruits, Salon of 1875
- Retour de marché, Salon of 1875
- Trop de reconnaissance, Salon of 1876
- L'aiguille de la grand'maman, Salon of 1877
- Une allée de jardin à Écouen, Salon of 1877
- Convalescence, Exposition Universelle (1878)
- Flagrant délit, Exposition Universelle (1878)
- L'intempérance, Exposition Universelle (1878)
- La fête de la grand'maman, Salon of 1879
- Les orphelins, Salon of 1879
- Le pitre, Salon of 1880
- En retenue, Salon of 1880
- Le braconnier, Salon of 1881
- Avant la messe, Salon of 1881
- Les petits ours, Salon of 1882

== Gallery ==
Paintings by Théophile Emmanuel Duverger
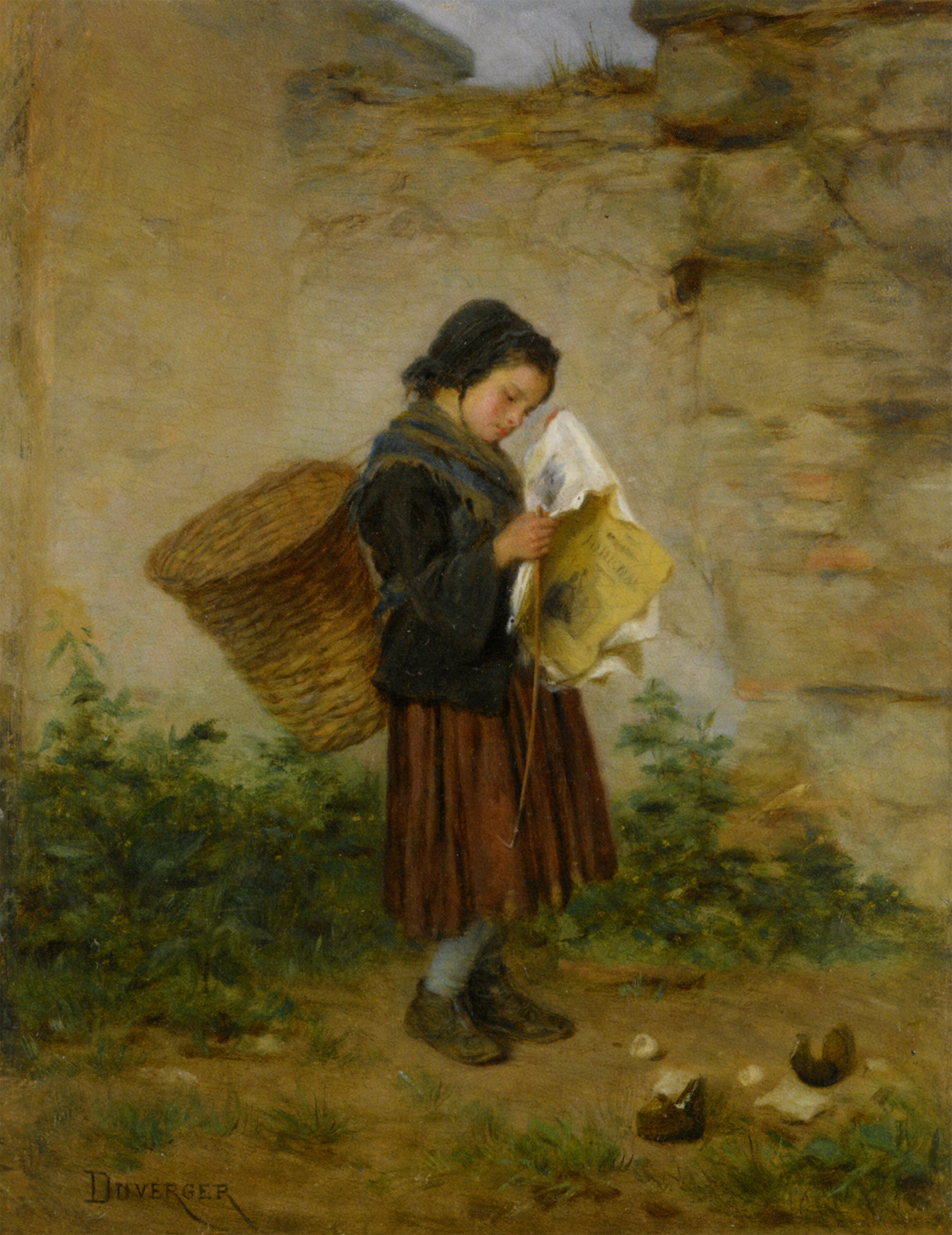
The Day's Titles

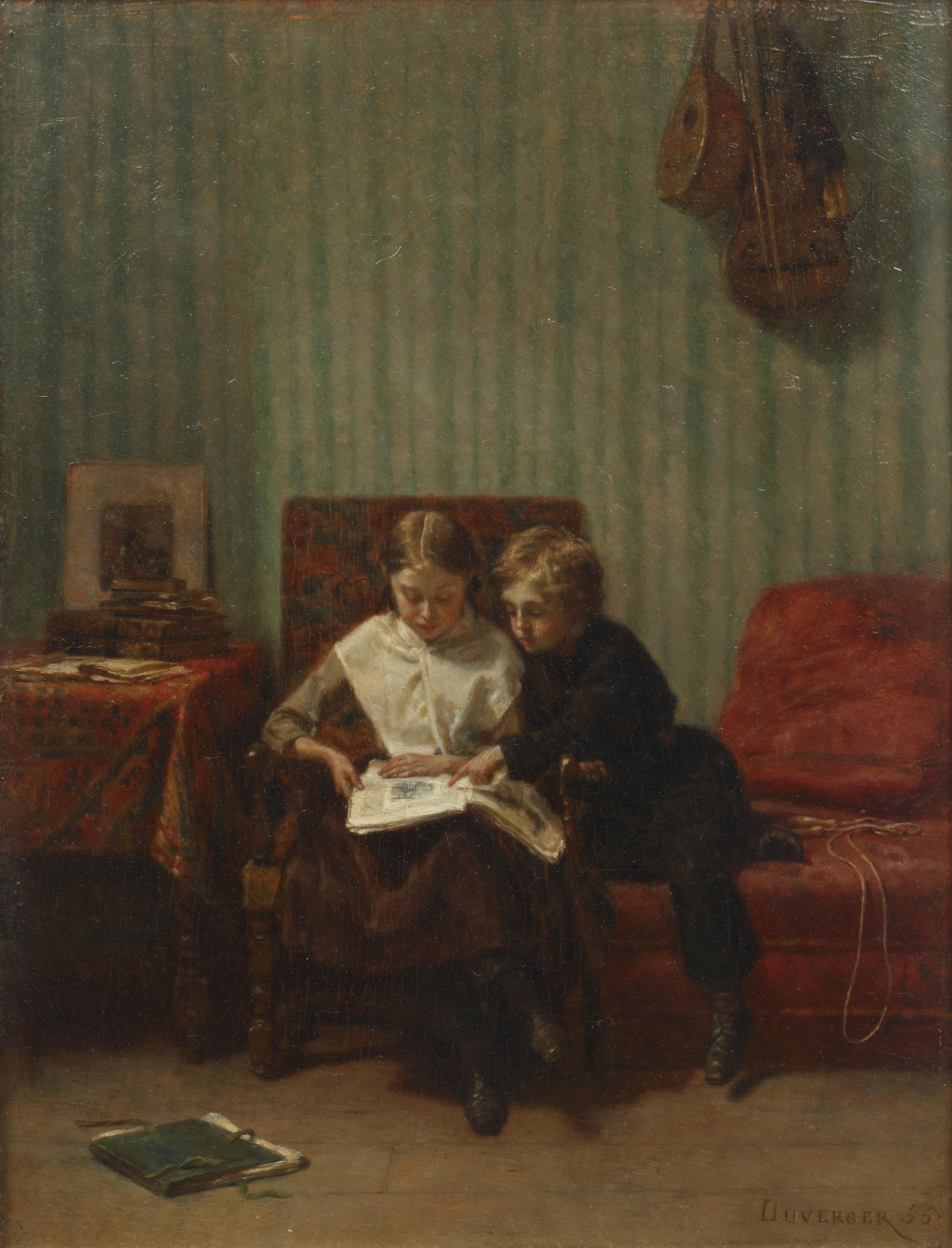
Two children reading

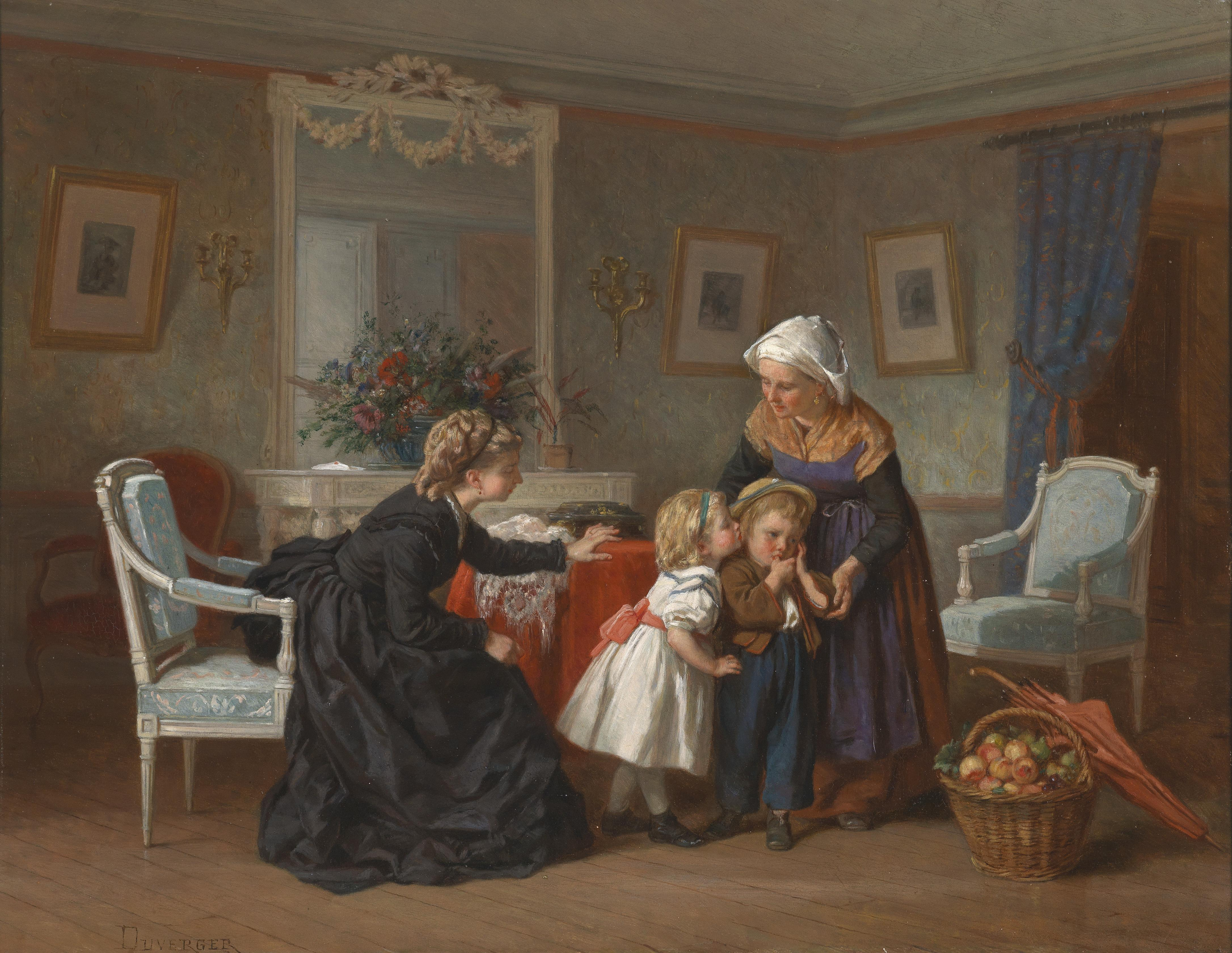
Visit to the country

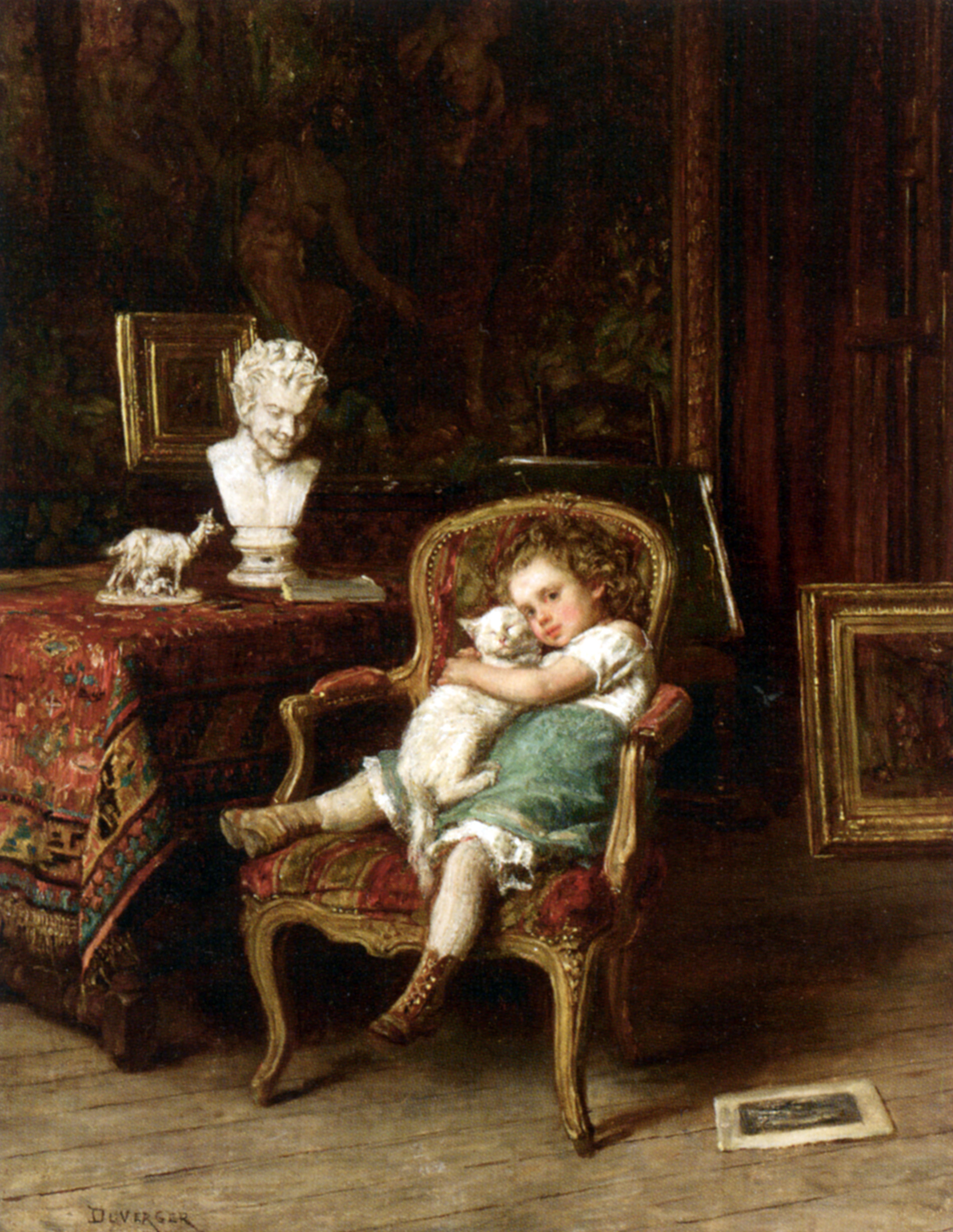
Best friends

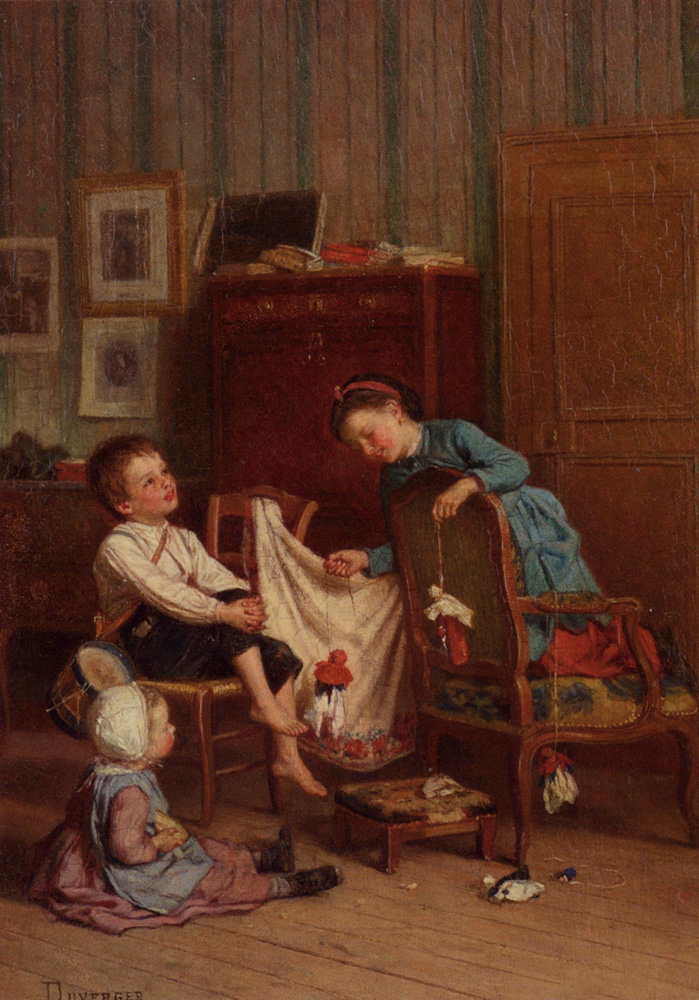
The puppet show

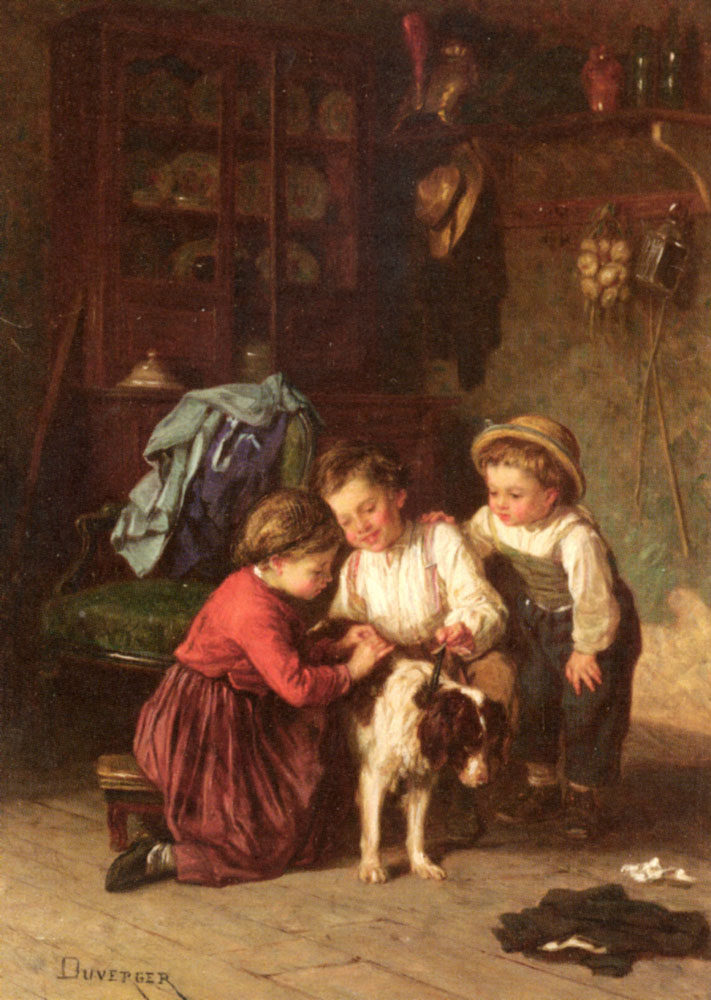
The pet patient
