= Château Gruaud-Larose =

French winery

Coordinates: 45°08′40″N 0°45′03″W

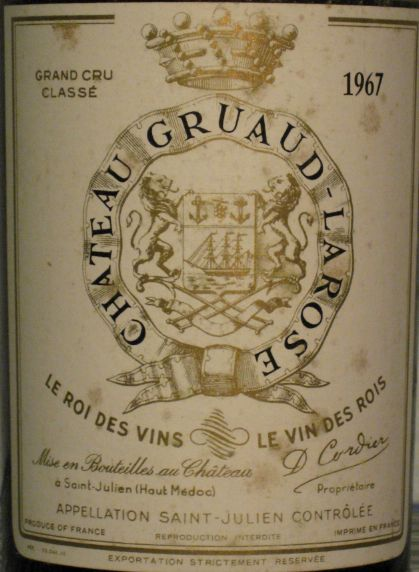
Detail of a Château Gruaud-Larose 1967 label

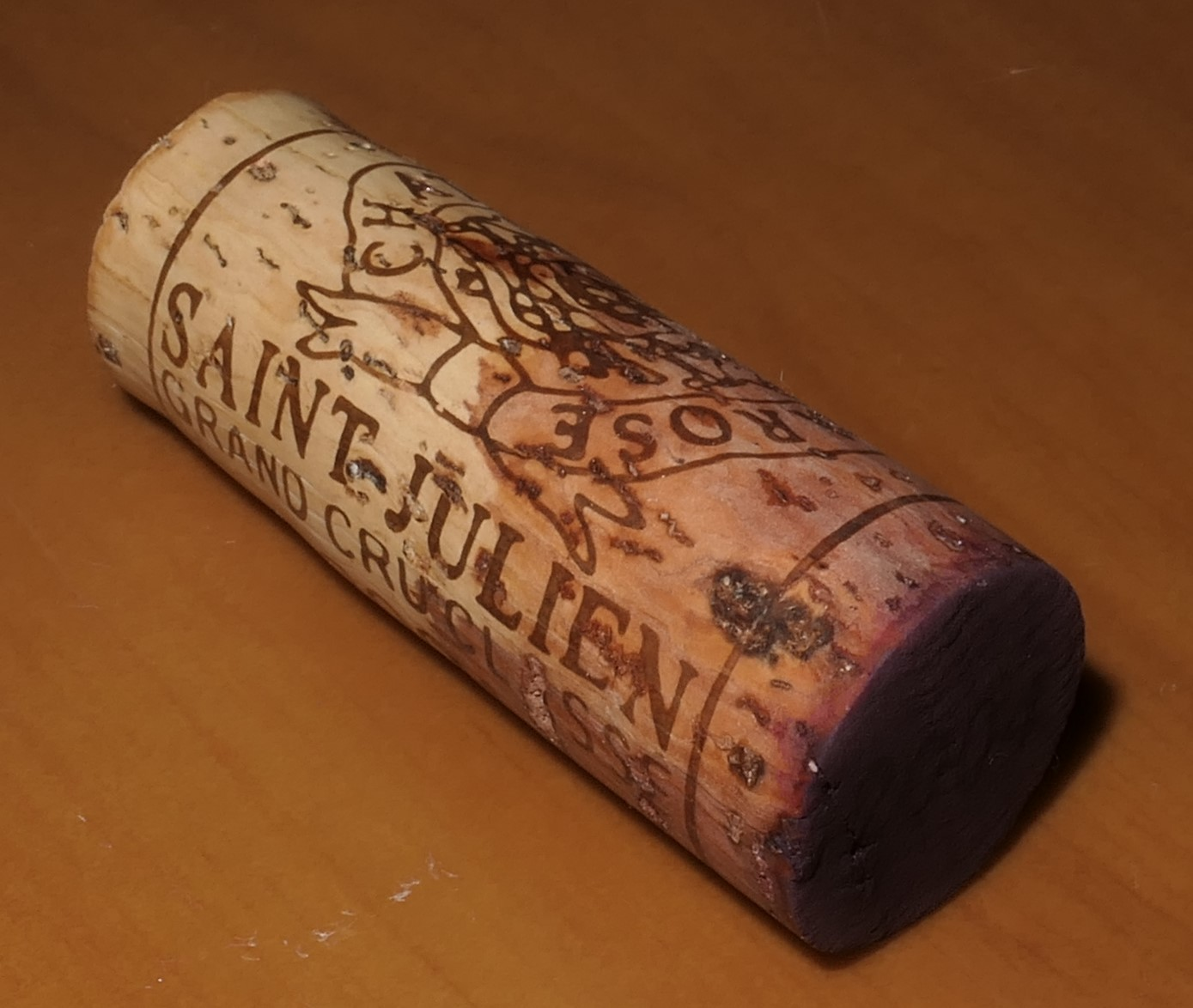

Château Gruaud-Larose is a winery in the Saint-Julien appellation of the Bordeaux region of France. It is also the name of the red wine produced by this property. The wine produced here was classified as one of fifteen Deuxièmes Crus (Second Growths) in the original Bordeaux Wine Official Classification of 1855.

== History ==
The property has a younger history than most of its cohorts. Its origins date to 1725 and the knight Joseph Stanislas Gruaud. The property was called Fond-Bedeau, and was administered by two Gruauds; one a priest and the other a magistrate. The magistrate, the Chevalier du Gruaud, died in 1778 and his part of the property was deeded to Joseph Sebastian de La Rose, who renamed this property Gruaud-La Rose or Gruaud-Larose. This piece was classified as a Second Growth in 1855.

Control of the property was split among multiple descendants, but the property remained intact until 1867 when it was split into Château Gruaud-Larose-Sarget (after the Baron Sarget) and Château Gruaud-Larose-Faure (after Adrien Faure, who married one Sophie Bethmann, heiress to a portion of the estate).

The two châteaux were reunited by the Cordier family, who purchased the Sarget piece in 1917 and the Faure piece in 1935; the château became a centerpiece of the many Cordier properties along with Château Lafaurie-Peyraguey and Château Talbot.

In 1983 it was purchased by the Compagnie de Suez, and in 1993 by Alcatel-Alsthom, and in 1997 by the Taillan Group, headed by Jacques Merlaut, which owns a number of other properties, most notably Château Haut-Bages-Liberal.

== Vineyards ==
The vineyards cover 82 hectares (200 acres) and are planted with 57% Cabernet Sauvignon, 30% Merlot, 8% Cabernet Franc, 3% Petit Verdot and 2% Malbec.

== Second wine ==
The Château produces a second wine called Sarget de Château Gruaud-Larose, or Larose de Gruaud. There is also a third label of this château's wine: La Roseraie de Gruaud Larose
