= Victoire de Donnissan de La Rochejaquelein =

French memoirist (1772–1857)

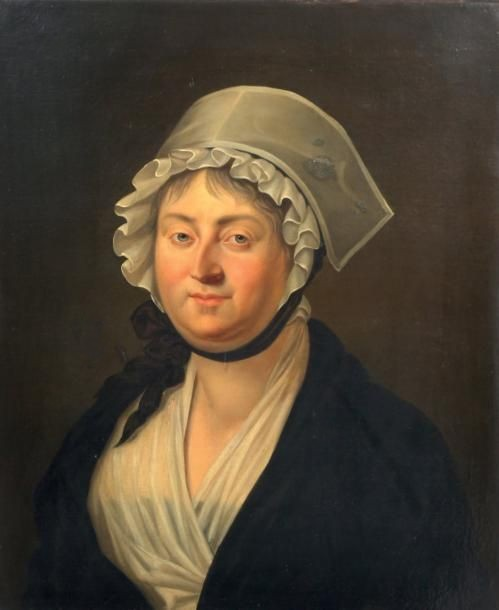
Victoire de Donnissan de La Rochejaquelein

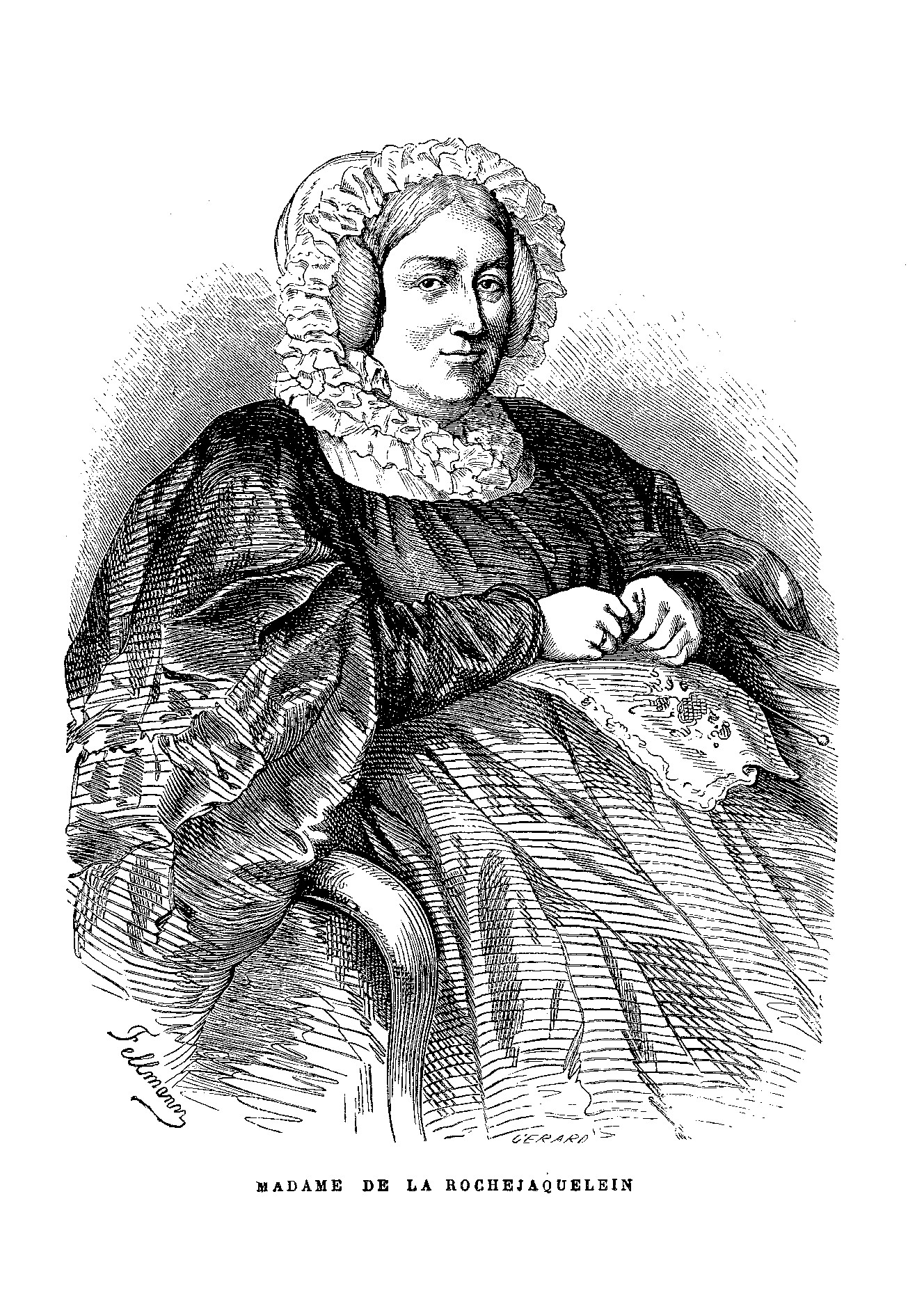
Victoire de Donnissan de La Rochejaquelein

Marie Louise Victoire de Donnissan de La Rochejaquelein née marquise de Lescure (French pronunciation: [maʁi lwiz viktwaʁ də dɔnisɑ̃ də la ʁɔʃʒaklɛ̃]; 25 October 1772 - 15 February 1857), was a French memoirist. She is known for her memoirs, depicting her misfortunes and her part in the Vendée wars.

== Life ==
She was born at Versailles as the daughter of the courtier Guy Joseph de Donnissan and the lady-in-waiting Marie-Françoise de Durfort-Civrac. She was a member of a court family, and the goddaughter of Madame Victoire.

She and her mother left the court after the outbreak of the French Revolution in 1789, and retired to the family property in the country.

=== French revolution ===
In 1791, she married her cousin the marquis de Lescure, with whom she had been engaged since childhood. The couple intended to emigrate in February 1792, but decided to stay in Paris on the request of the queen, and attended the royal court.

She describe both the Demonstration of 20 June 1792 as well as the Storming of the Tuileries in her memoirs. She and her spouse left Paris before the September massacres.

She accompanied her spouse during the Revolt in the Vendée. She became a widow in 1793.

She left for Spain in 1797.

=== Later life ===
She was able to return to France in 1799. When a conciliatory policy was adopted, she managed to save much of the property of herself and her late spouse.

In 1802, she secondly married Louis du Vergier de La Rochejaquelein, the cousin of her first spouse, and retired with him to her estates, both refusing all offers to serve in any capacity under Napoleon. She had a daughter, Louise de La Rochejaquelin who was a friend of Georges Sand.In 1814, the couple took an active part in the Royalist movement in and about Bordeaux, when her spouse attempted to bring about another Vendan rising for Louis XVIII, for which he was killed. She died at Orléans in 1857.

== Memoirs ==
Her memoirs, recording foremost her life during her misfortunes and her part in the Vendée wars, were first published at Bordeaux in 1815. They are considered to give a remarkable picture of the war and the fortunes of the Royalists.
