= Château Ferrière =

Winery in the Bordeaux region of France

Coordinates: 45.0433°N 0.6778°W

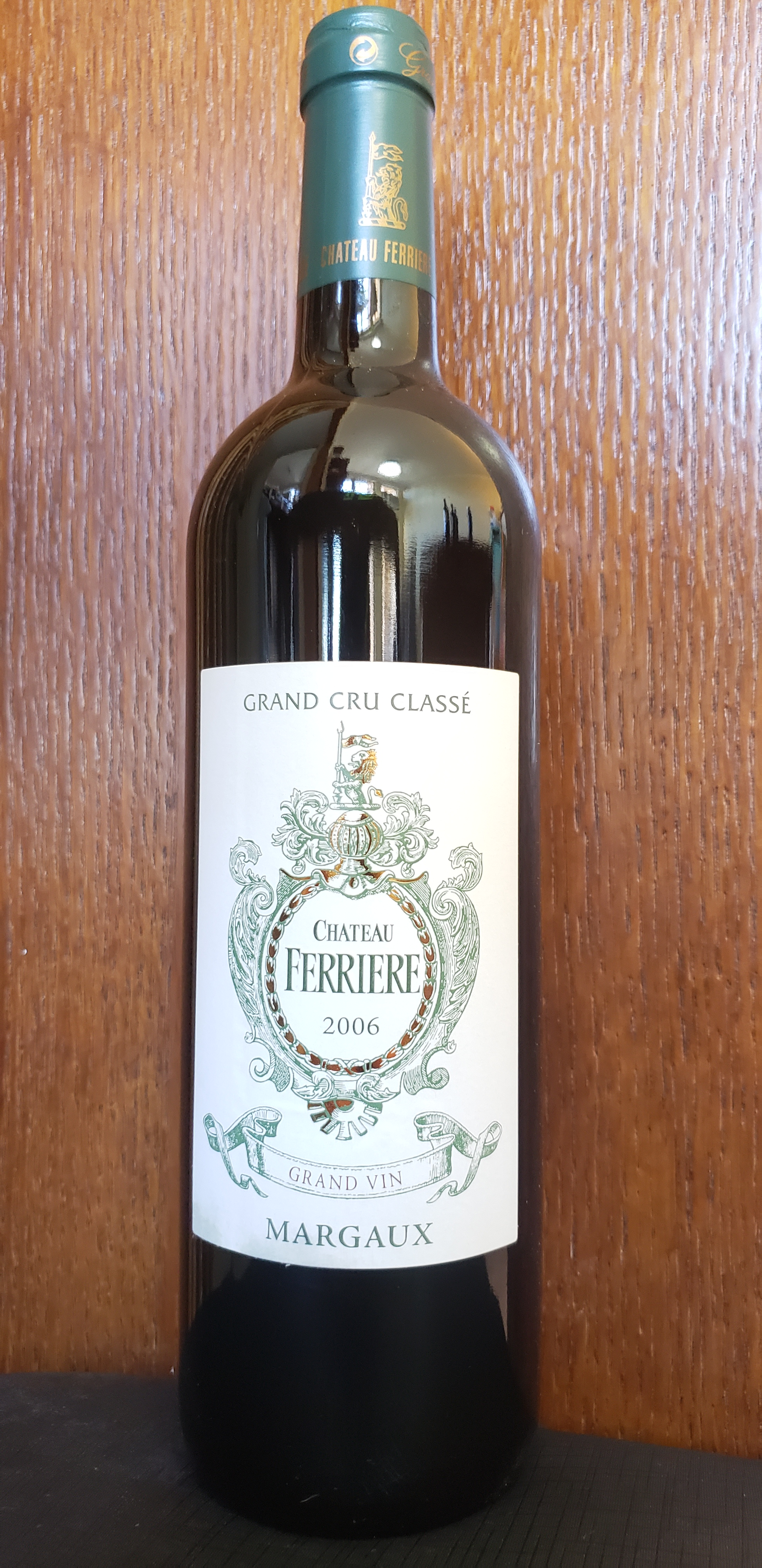
Grand Vin 2006

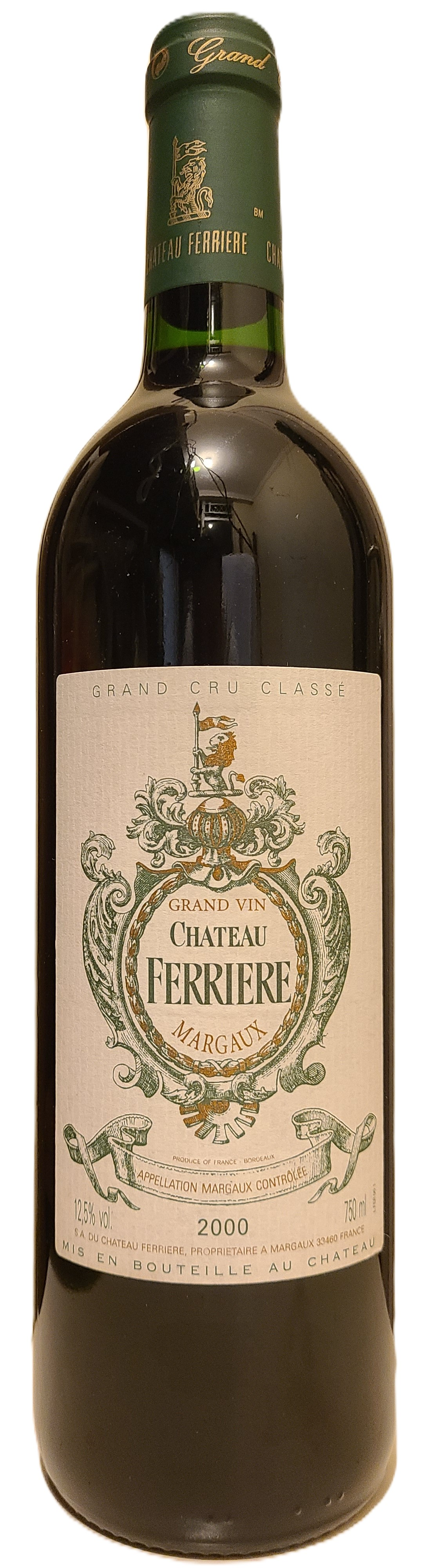
Grand Vin 2000

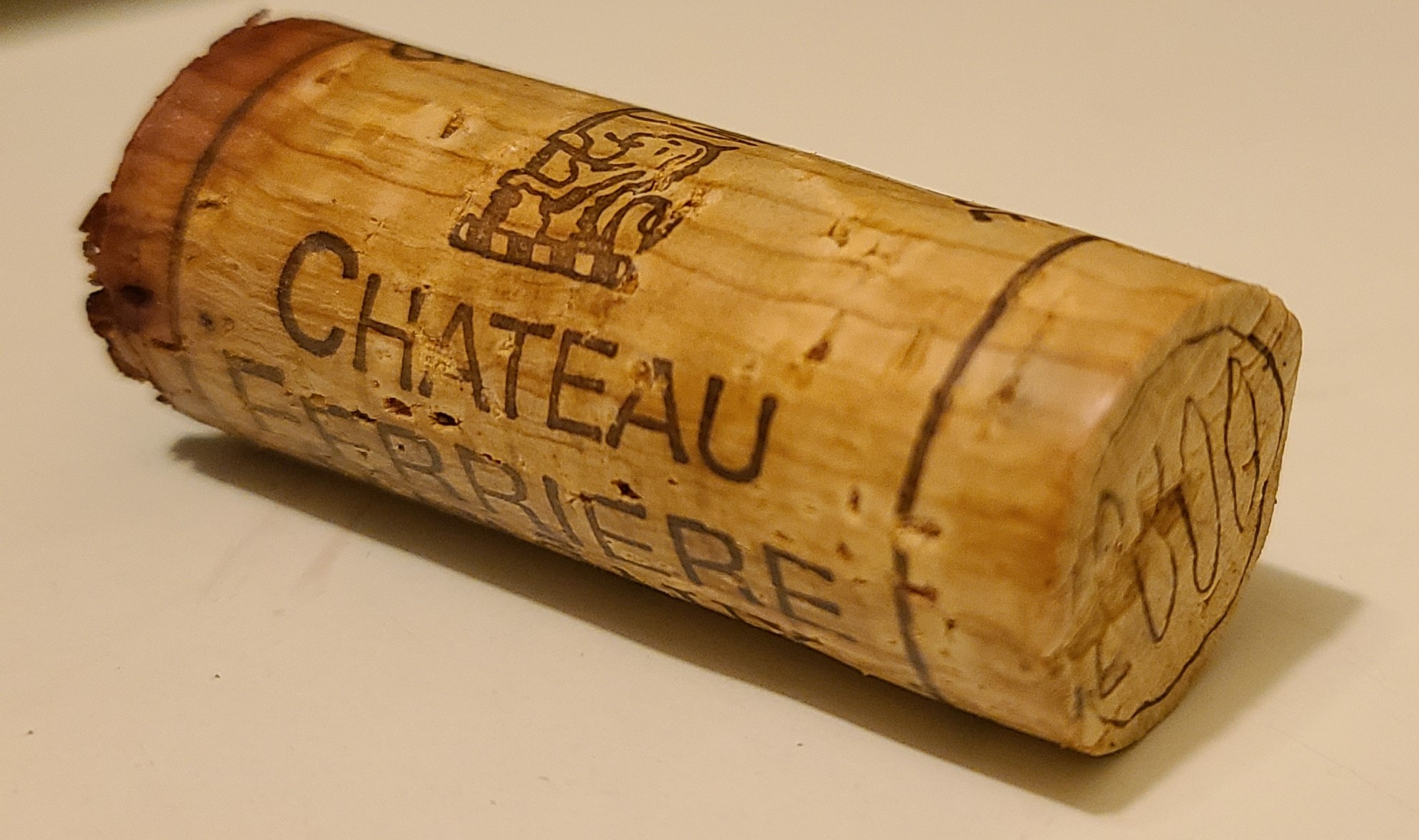
Cork

Château Ferrière is a winery in the Margaux appellation of the Bordeaux region of France. The wine produced here was classified as one of fourteen Troisièmes Crus (Third Growths) in the historic Bordeaux Wine Official Classification of 1855. The Château has 29 acres (12 ha) planted with Cabernet Sauvignon, Merlot and Cabernet Franc.

A second wine is produced under the label Les Remparts de Ferriere.

The estate is run by Claire Villars-Lurton, manager of Château Haut-Bages-Liberal and Château La Gurge, and wife of Gonzague Lurton, owner of Château Durfort-Vivens.

== History ==
The estate's name comes from its founder, Gabriel FERRIERE, who was a royal in charge of the king's hunts during the 18th century. In 1777, he sold it to his cousins also named FERRIERE. One of them, Jean FERRIERE, will become mayor of the city of Bordeaux after Robespierre's fall, in 1795. In 1855, took place the classification of the Medoc growths. On this occasion, Château Ferrière was classified [third growth]. The estate remained in the hands of the FERRIERE family until 1914, when it was sold to Armand FEUILLERAT, then owner of another Margaux classified growth, [Château Marquis de Terme]. In 1952, [Alexis LICHINE] took over the management of Château Ferrière as a farmer and all the wine was vinified at Château Lascombes, second growth in Margaux. During 40 years, only a small quantity of bottles is produced and the wine somehow becomes a second label for Château Lascombes. Only passengers of a famous airline had the opportunity to taste its potential.

== Return of a classified growth ==
In 1988, the VILLARS family purchases the vineyard and the buildings, but it is only in 1992 that the agricultural lease comes to an end. The family then takes over the management of the vineyard as well as the vinification. The estate is now owned by Claire Villars-Lurton.

== Technical information ==
Information
Owner	Claire VILLARS LURTON
Winemaking consultant	Eric BOISSENOT
Surface of the wineyard	12 hectares
Soil	Deep gravels on limestone substrate
Average age of vineyard	45 Years old
Density	10 000 plants/ha
Plantation	65% Cabernet Sauvignon, 30% Merlot, 5% Cabernet Franc
Winemaking	Traditional, in concrete and wooden vats, whose volumes are proportional to the plot
Ageing	40% of new oak, ageing during 18 months

== Visit ==
Château Ferrière is open from Monday to Friday, from 9h00 to 12h30 and 14h00 to 17h30.
