= Grand Uniform of the École Polytechnique =

School uniform

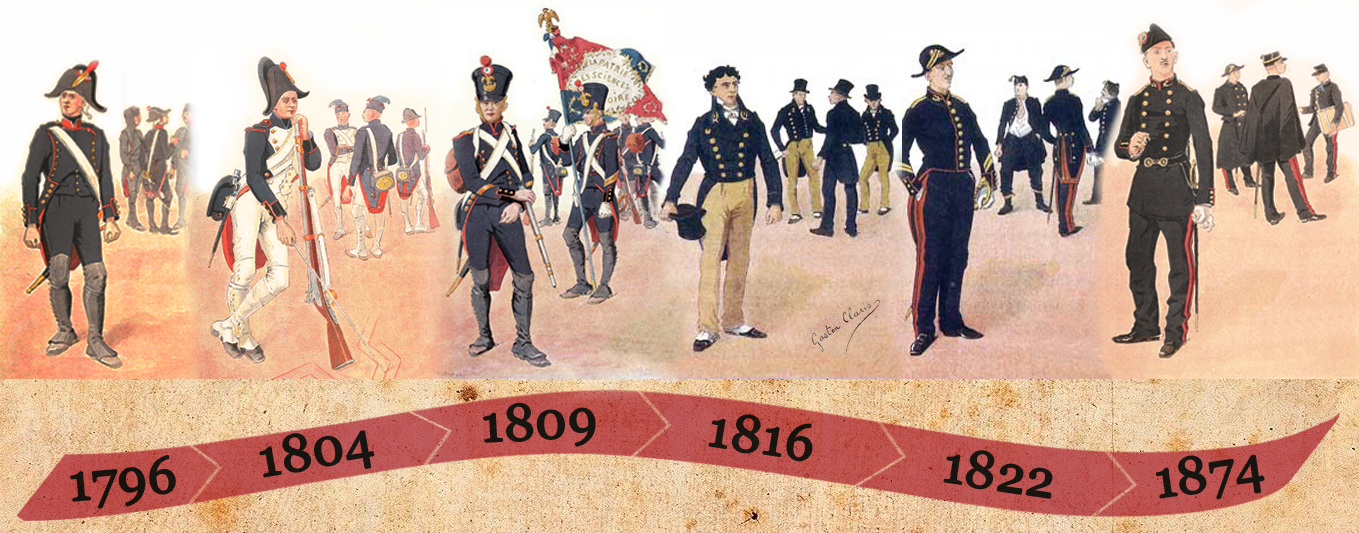
Evolution of the Great Uniform of the École polytechnique from 1796 to 1874. Illustrations by Gaston Claris (1895).

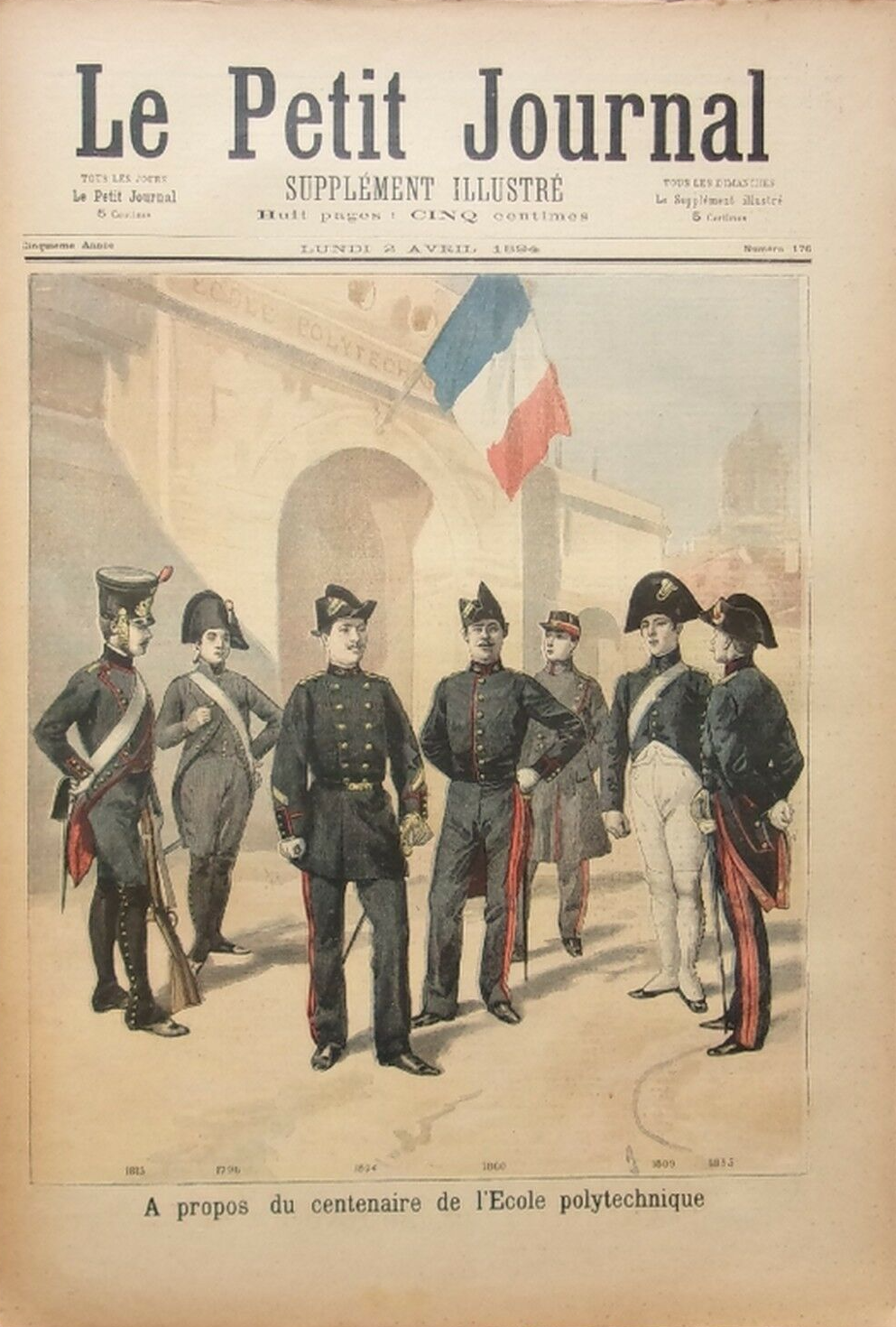
Le Petit Journal, 1894: performance of the Grands Uniformes since the school was founded.

The history of the Grand Uniform of the École Polytechnique reflects numerous changes, modeled on the shifts in political regimes, successive governments, and wars that have shaped France's history since the late 18th century. From the National Convention to the Fifth Republic, the Grand Uniform reflects the evolution of societal organization.

Originally, polytechnic students were issued two uniforms: one for daily use, known as "BD" for Battle Dress in the 20th century, and the other, a ceremonial uniform called "grande tenue," which over time became known as the Grand Uniform. The interior uniform should not be confused with the "petite tenue" or Petit Uniforme, a formal dress similar to the Grand Uniform except for the headgear.

Although the interior uniform disappeared in the 20th century, the Grand Uniform has endured. Every student, called an "X," (Note: The modern designation, since the creation of the new curricula at the École Polytechnique, is as follows: "student of the polytechnic engineering cycle." This designation is used by the official École website archive, but students prefer to refer to themselves as "X.") receives a Grand Uniform—commonly referred to as "GU," pronounced gy in polytechnic slang—which is worn for military ceremonies and specific events linked to the École Polytechnique, such as the Bal de l'X. (Note: Polytechnicians attend the Bal de l'X in Grand Uniform, while polytechnician women wear a red dress: Photograph from the Bal de l'X 2015.)

Since its creation in 1794, wearing the uniform has been a tradition that unites all generations of students who have passed through the École Polytechnique. It symbolizes belonging to a community that claims a heritage of over two centuries.

== History ==
=== First Republic and First Empire ===
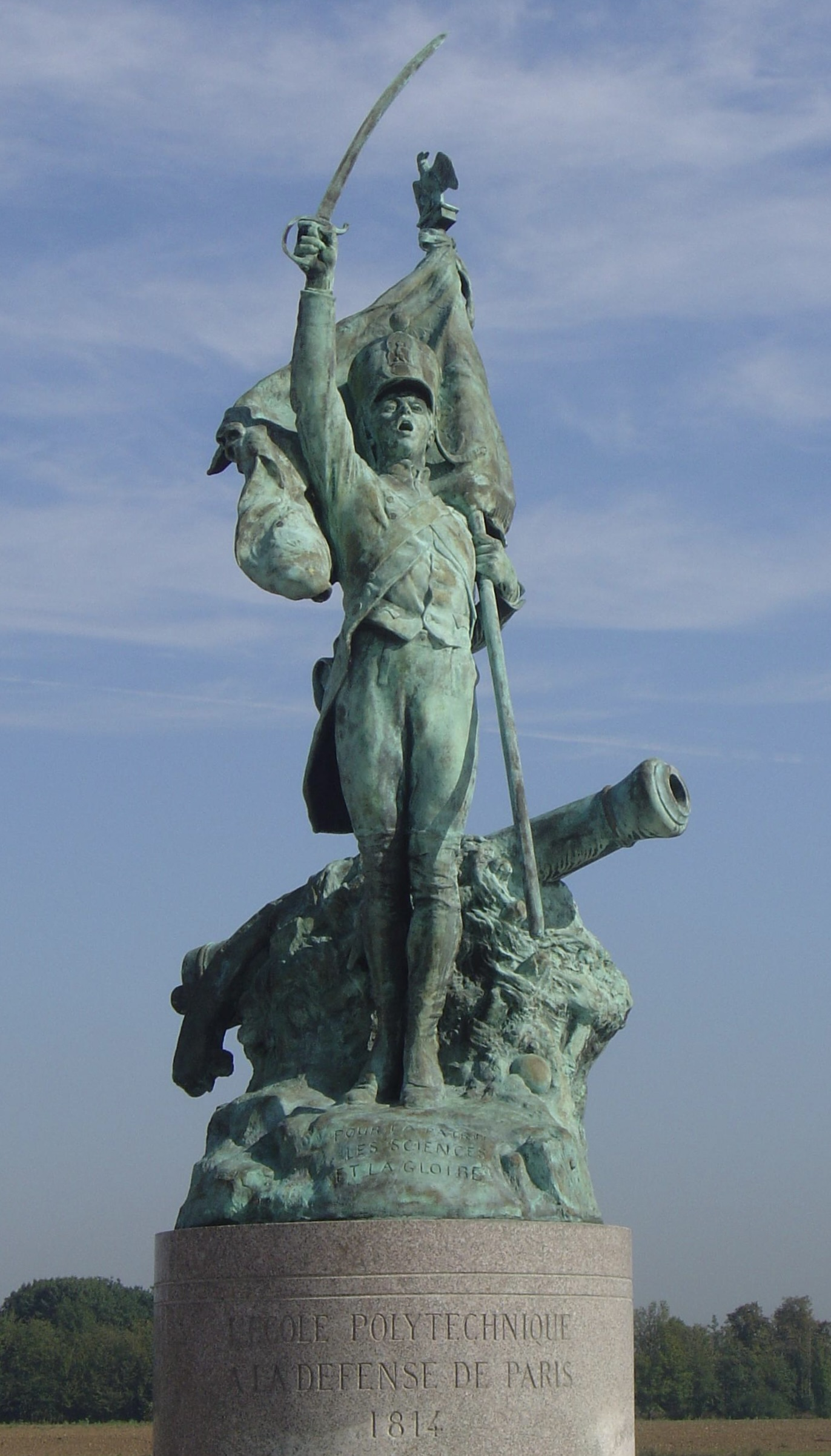
Le Conscrit de 1814, bronze by Corneille Theunissen (1914): polytechnician in full uniform fighting heroically during the Battle of Paris. (Note: A replica of this monument can be found at the United States Military Academy at West Point, named the Monument de l'École Polytechnique.)

The French Revolution of 1789 led to the abolition of many French institutions and a disruption of social norms, including the uniforms of royal armies. In this context, the École Centrale des Travaux Publics, which would be renamed École Polytechnique a year later, was established on 21 Ventôse Year II (March 11, 1794) to provide the nation with high-level leaders on a meritocratic model and to contribute to the war effort through knowledge and technical skills during the French Revolutionary Wars.

On 6 Frimaire Year III (November 26, 1794), a few months after the school's creation by the National Convention, Jacques-Élie Lamblardie, the school's first director-general, proposed issuing uniforms to students despite their civilian status. The objective was to distinguish polytechnicians from other citizens while instilling respect for the uniform. On 8 Pluviôse Year IV (January 28, 1796), the uniform of a cannoneer of the National Guard was assigned to students—a tricolor cockaded hat, gold buttons, and a saber. However, implementing the decree in a turbulent political context proved challenging. The École Centrale des Travaux Publics was renamed École Polytechnique by the law of 15 Fructidor Year III (September 1, 1795), and it was on the 1796 class uniform that the buttons bore the inscription "École Polytechnique" for the first time.

The coup d'état of 18 Fructidor, Year V (September 4, 1797), saw three members of the Directory, supported by the army, overthrow the Council of Five Hundred and the Council of Ancients, which were controlled by a royalist majority. The legislative body's guard offered no resistance, but the polytechnicians showed readiness to intervene in defense of the legislative power if the conflict turned violent. The incident at the Théâtre des Jeunes-Artistes, where students instigated violent altercations, convinced the ruling authorities to find a way to temper the students' behavior. In 1798, a formal decision ordered them to obtain a uniform without delay, as it was believed that, once identifiable, they would exhibit more restrained behavior. The new uniform consisted of a shawl-collared coat closed by five gold buttons, cut in the French style, with a jacket and trousers in national blue, and a three-cornered hat. More civilian than military in appearance, it was said to have been inspired by the designs of David.

The tricorne had the drawback of hindering the handling of the rifle: the front horn made it difficult to hold the weapon vertically and obstructed the wearer's field of vision. This third horn gradually disappeared, leading to adopt the bicorne worn en bataille, (Note: The term "battle" indicates the martial purpose of this headgear.) a headgear generalized across all regiments between 1786 and 1791. While the tricorne was associated with the Ancien Régime, the bicorne, on the contrary, became a symbol of republican identity.

A uniform for both full dress and undress, in the infantry style, (Note: "The grand uniform for Sundays and holidays consisted of a French-style national blue coat with a high collar in scarlet cloth and white lapels, black cuffs and facings, blue shoulder straps, gold buttons, and scarlet cloth turnbacks in the shape of triangles. Additionally, a very fine white cloth vest, breeches of the same color, and white canvas gaiters with forty-six buttons. [...] The small uniform included a blue cloth frock coat with black facings, a vest of the same material, a double-breasted blue cloth overcoat, a bonnet de police with scarlet piping and yellow tassel, a cartridge box, and a knapsack." — Argot de l'X (1894).) was assigned to the students when Napoleon I granted the École its military status by the decree of 27 Messidor, Year XII (July 16, 1804). This decision had a dual objective: on the one hand, to bring disorderly students under control, particularly through barracks discipline, as their behavior could pose a threat to political authority; and on the other hand, to anticipate the needs of the Napoleonic army.

Under the First Empire, the shako replaced the tricorne and bicorne throughout the Napoleonic infantry: this hardened headgear provided better protection for soldiers. Around 1809, according to Gaston Claris (by decision of April 27, 1810, according to the archives), this visor-capped headgear was thus given to the students of the École, who also retained the bicorne due to their vocation to serve in the scientific branches—engineering, artillery—which were not expected to be in direct contact with the enemy. (Note: Until 1971, students of the Lyon Army Health Service School wore the "Pinder" uniform, which had retained the bicorne for the same reason.) Serving in the scientific branches did not prevent the polytechnicians from distinguishing themselves in 1814 during the defense of Paris against the European allied forces opposing Napoleon I. Chateaubriand mentions this feat of arms in his Mémoires d'outre-tombe:

Never did military France shine with a brighter radiance amid its setbacks; the last heroes were the one hundred and fifty young men of the École polytechnique, transformed into gunners in the redoubts of the Vincennes road.

— François-René de Chateaubriand, Mémoires d'outre-tombe (1841)

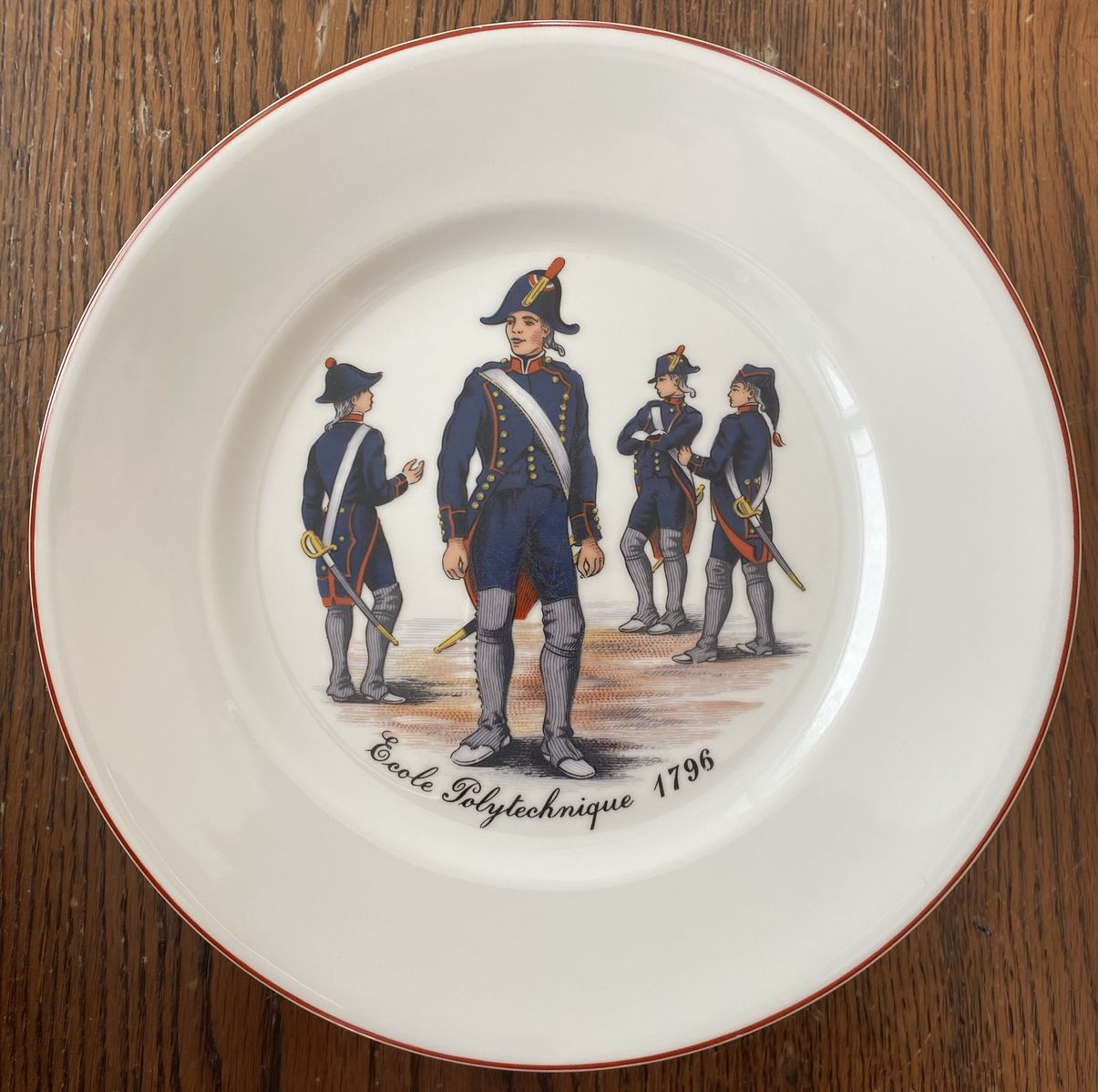
Grand Uniform of 1796.

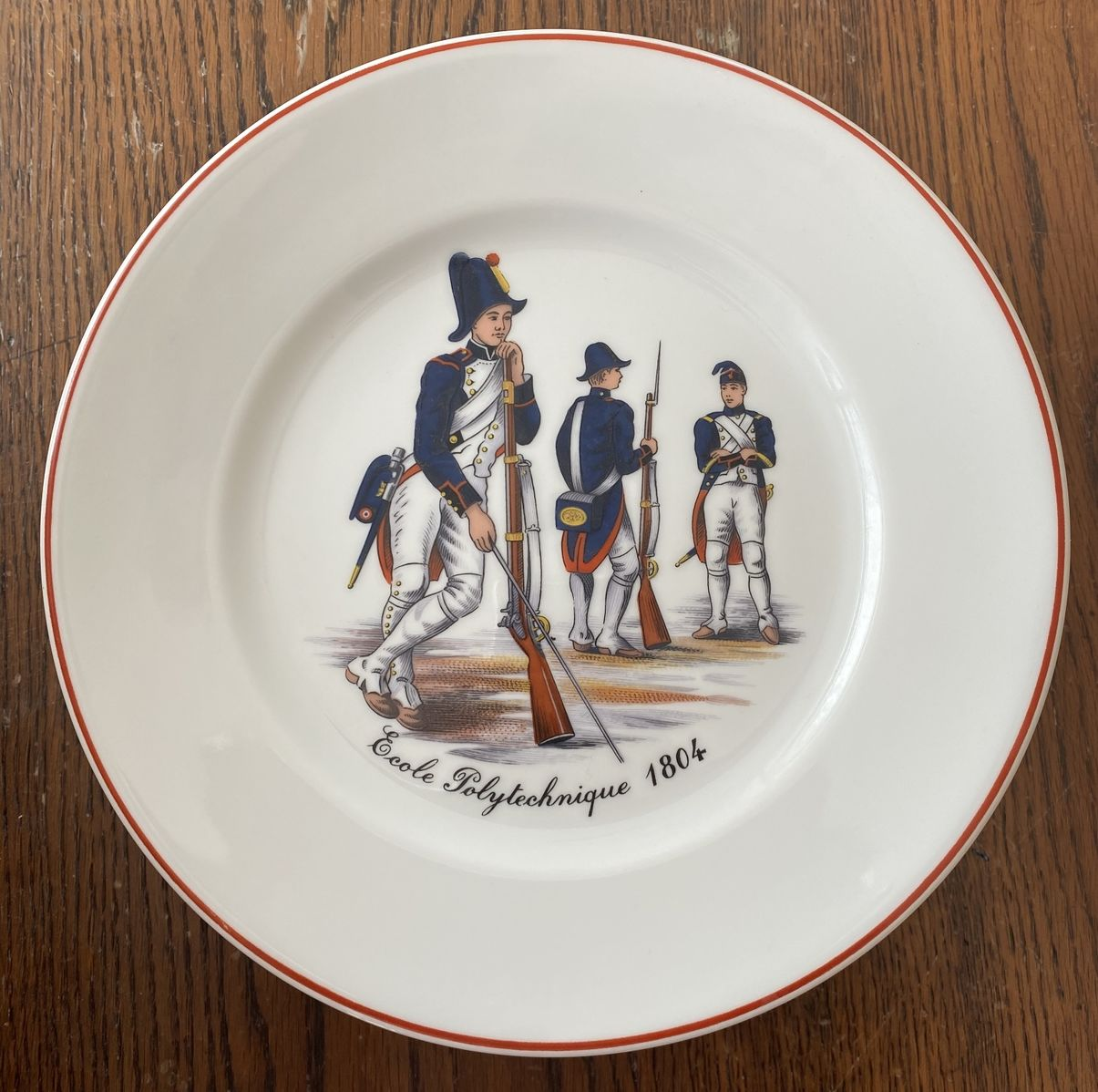
Grand Uniform of 1804.

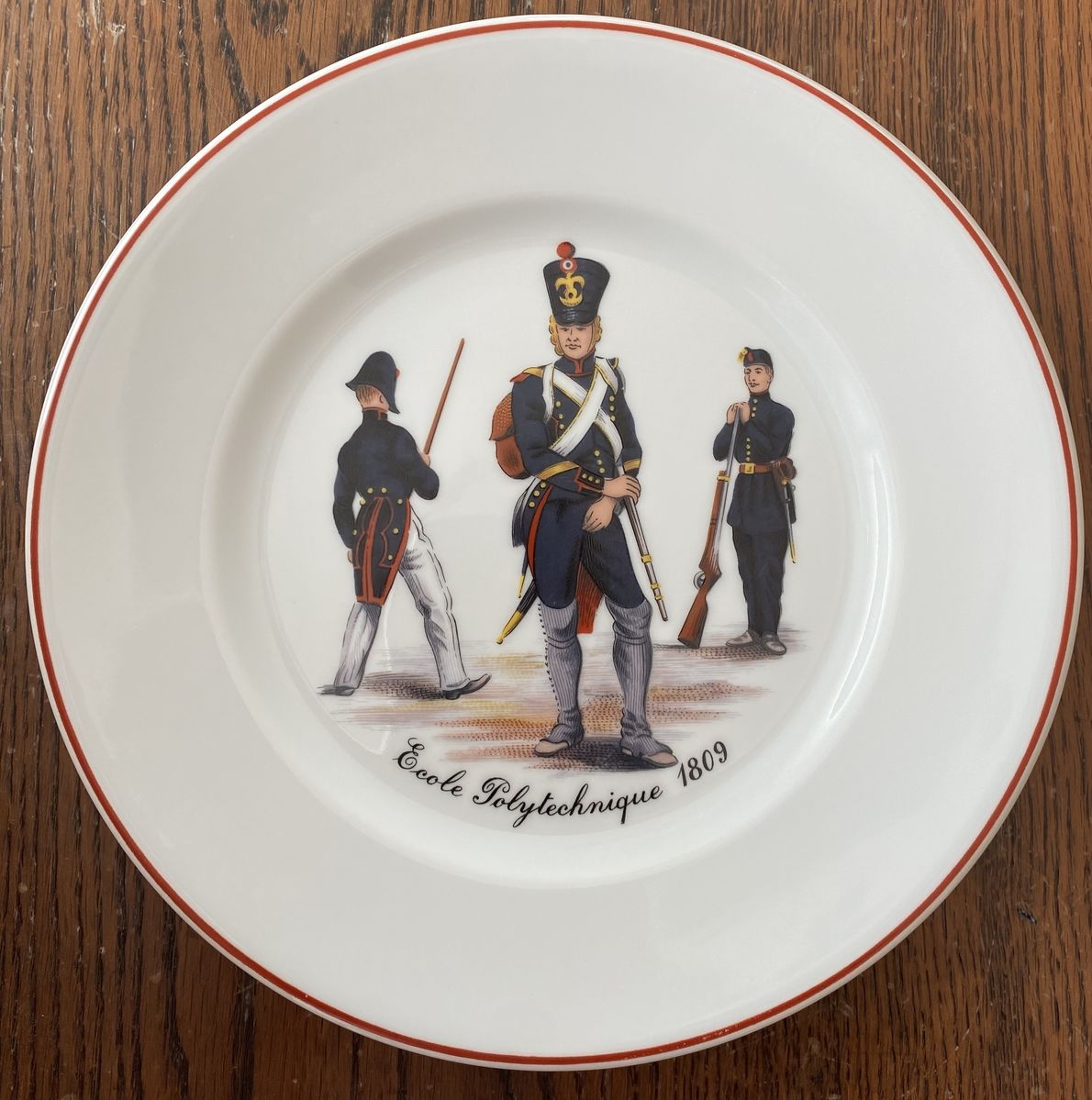
Grand Uniform of 1809.

=== From the Restoration to the Second Empire ===
During the Restoration, the École was sanctioned for insubordination, with the principal troublemaker being Auguste Comte. This resulted in a collective dismissal on April 13, 1816. This event foreshadowed the reorganization ordinance of September 4, 1816, under Louis XVIII, which abolished the military regime and apparatus of the École. Consequently, the military uniform was replaced by civilian attire, including a top hat.

In 1822, the École Polytechnique was repeatedly disturbed by internal unrest. The students had developed the habit of submitting collective decisions to a vote, which caused disorder in the monarchical context. One student was expelled; out of solidarity, all his classmates declared their intention to leave as well. The conflict was eventually resolved through the erosion of collective solidarity, but following this crisis, the civilian regime was called into question. Thus, following the royal ordinances of September 17 and October 20, 1822, under Louis XVIII, General Bordessoulle, then governor of the École, once again provided the students with a military uniform: (Note: "Bicorne worn vertically—as it is today—black cloth coat, "the coat has a single row of buttons, with red lapels, black velvet cuffs and collar, artillery and engineering buttons, trousers with red stripes." — Argot de l'X (1894).) polytechnicians wore the frock coat but, above all, resumed wearing the bicorne, (Note: In the 1822 prospectus from the Ministry of the Interior describing this uniform, the bicorne is referred to as a "French hat." View online: Prospectus p. 1 archive, Prospectus p. 2 archive. The bicorne's cockade was not described at the time but was most likely white, like the royal flag, rather than tricolor as it later became under the July Monarchy.) with the sergeants carrying a sword.

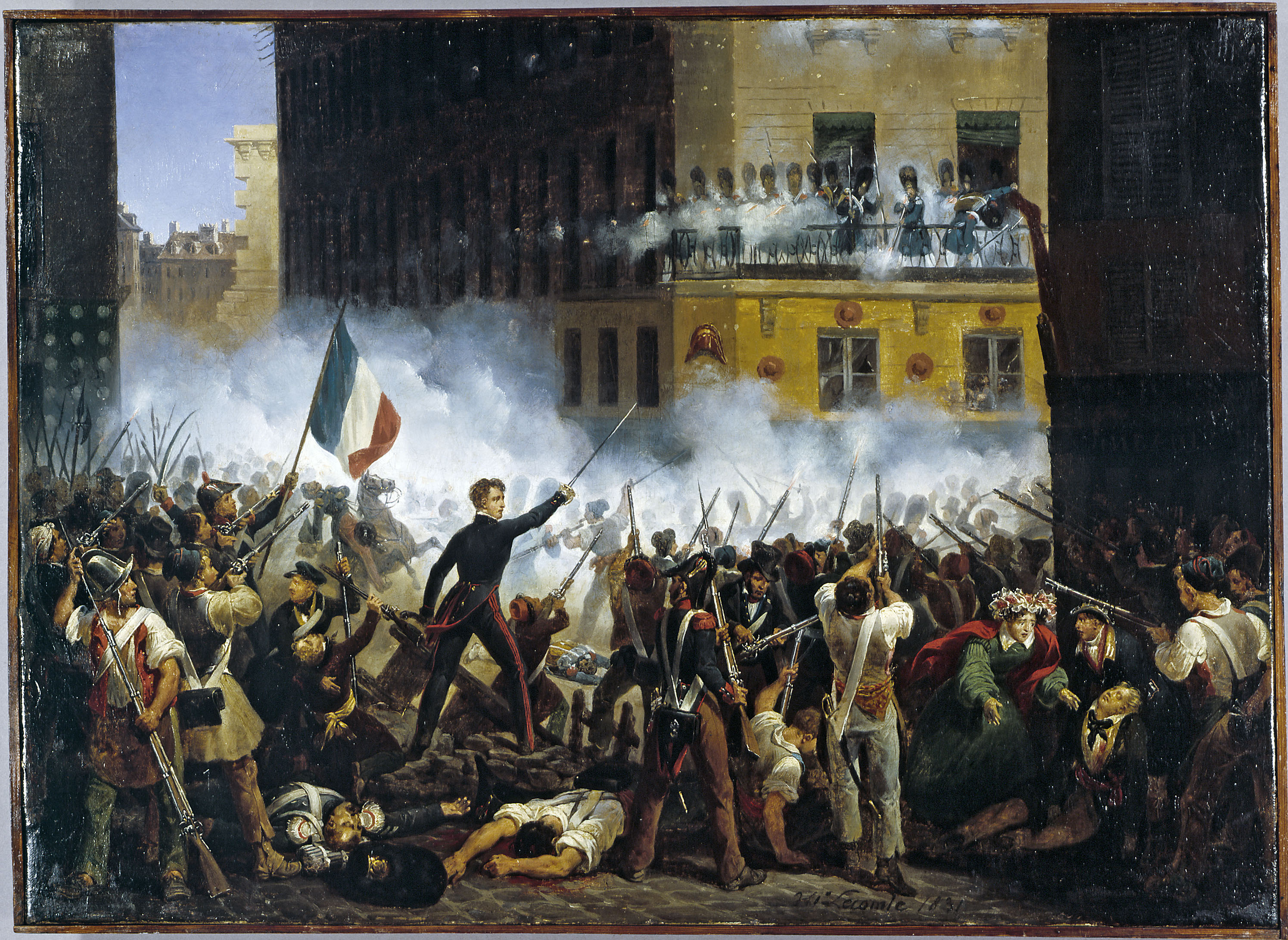
Hippolyte Lecomte, Combat de la rue de Rohan on July 29, 1830 (1831).

On July 25, 1830, the Ordinances of Saint-Cloud issued by Charles X suspended the freedom of the press, sparking the revolution in Paris. Following the Three Glorious Days, all the students were granted the right to carry a sword in recognition of their role in defending liberties alongside the insurgent people on the barricades. The presence of a polytechnician in the background of the painting Liberty Leading the People is a testament to the Nation's recognition of the support provided by the polytechnicians to the insurgents of 1830. Thus, the polytechnicians, who already had used the saber, obtained the sword in 1830, which they called the "tangent."

The Marquis de Lafayette expressed the popular enthusiasm surrounding the École Polytechnique:

There is no citizen who is not filled with admiration, confidence, I would even say respect, at the sight of this glorious uniform of the École Polytechnique which, in a moment of crisis, made each individual a force for the conquest of liberty and the maintenance of public order.

— Gilbert du Motier de La Fayette, Mémoires, correspondance et manuscrits, 1839

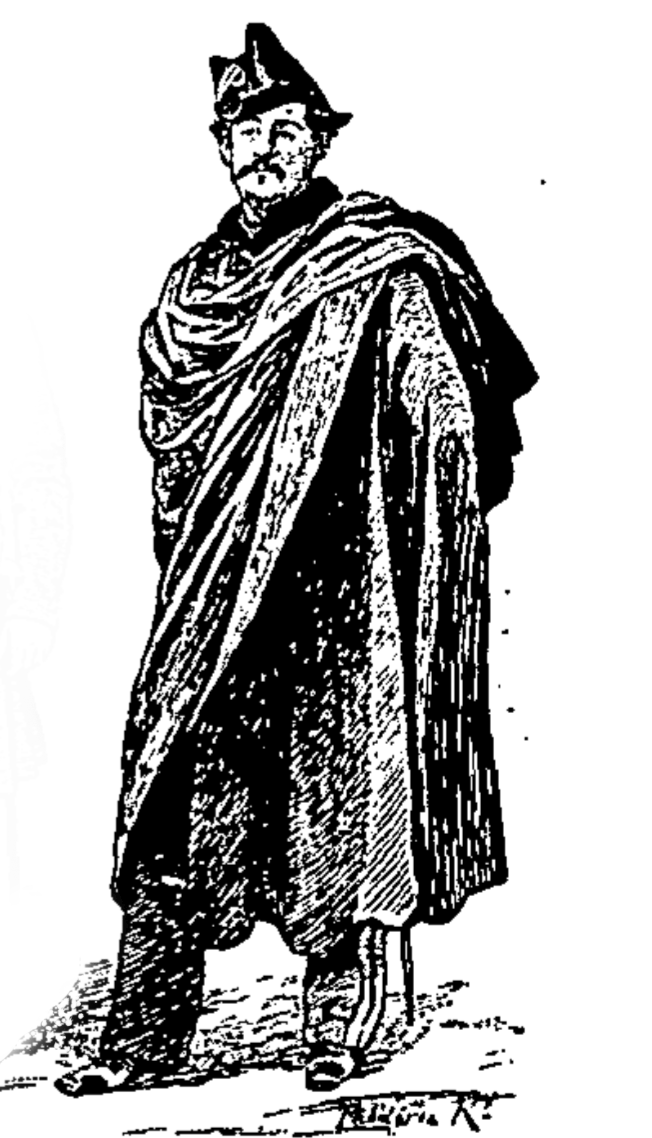
Chiroga coat worn shortly after 1824.

After 1824 and for a time, some students adopted, without regulatory approval, the Spanish cape known as the manteau à la chiroga, which they wore draped over the shoulder. Wearing the frock coat and the cape was in keeping with the fashion of the time. In particular, this Spanish cape, also called the manteau à la Quiroga, originated from the 1823 Spanish expedition led by France, which aimed to restore King Ferdinand VII to the throne and thereby replace the constitutional monarchy of the Liberal Triennium with an absolute monarchy. The liberals, in opposition to the royalists, named their cape after General Antonio Quiroga, who was one of the leaders of the Spanish army's insurrection on the Isle of León, and wore the cape in his manner—draped over the shoulder. The cape gradually lost its political connotation: with fashion's influence, both liberals and royalists wore the same cape, though one was made of crimson velvet and the other of black velvet. The redingote coat later became preferred, completing the small uniform in 1840. (Note: The history of uniform coats does not end there: The pelerine and paletot made their appearance in the Polytechnique uniform at the end of the 19th century; the pèlerine disappeared around 1940, while the paletot was only abandoned in 1987. For an illustration of the pèlerine and paletot of the Polytechnique, see "Tenue 31, a site dedicated to French uniforms from the interwar period, "École Polytechnique"" (in French). 10 April 2017.)

The 1822 uniform, particularly popular, was worn at the École under Louis-Philippe and Napoleon III without modification—except for the removal of fleur-de-lis symbols under the July Monarchy, which eliminated certain monarchical symbols (Note: For example, these arms from the July Monarchy do not feature fleur-de-lis.) —and remained unchanged until the fall of the Second Empire at the end of the Franco-Prussian War in 1870.

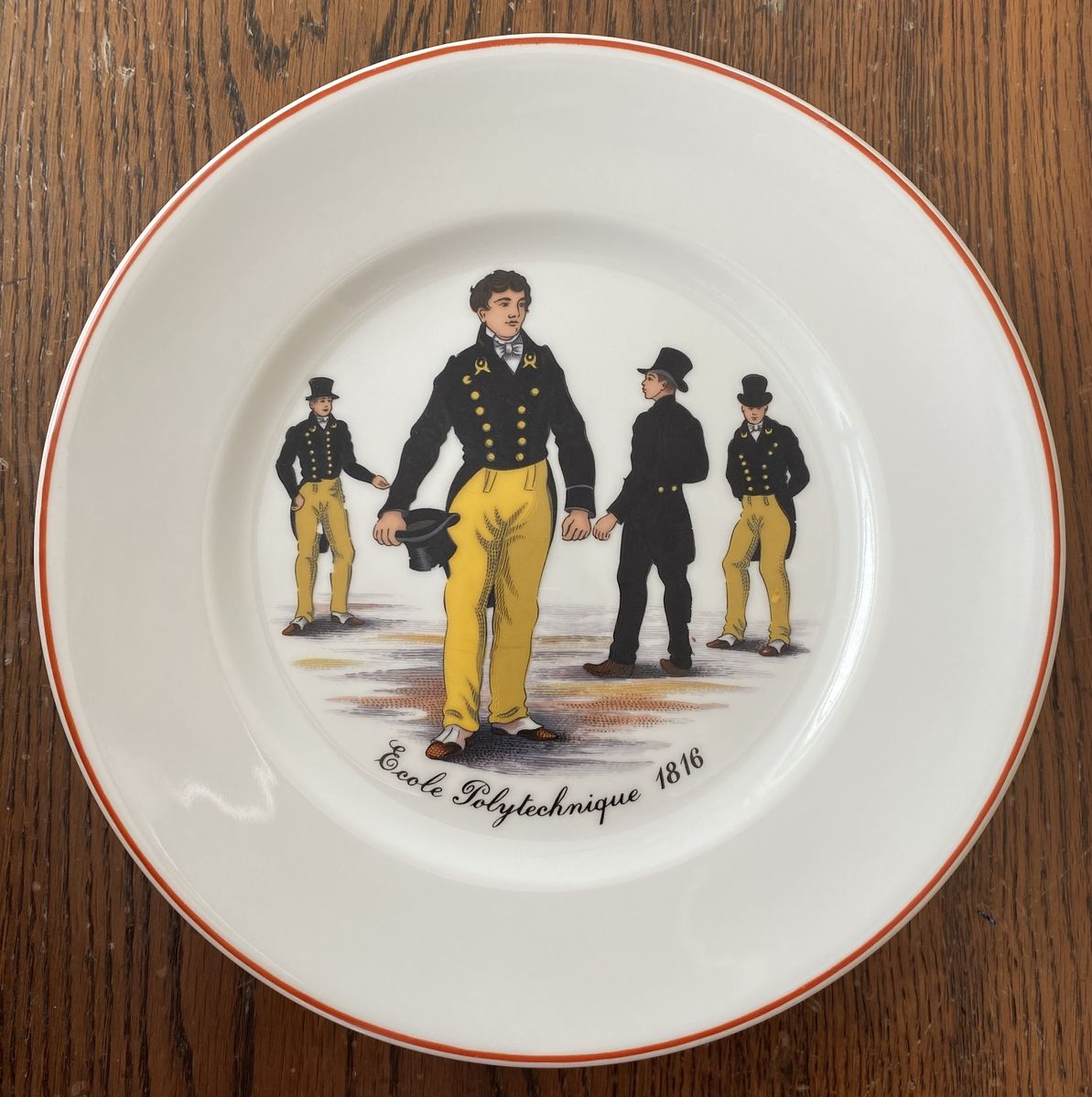
Grand Uniform of 1816.

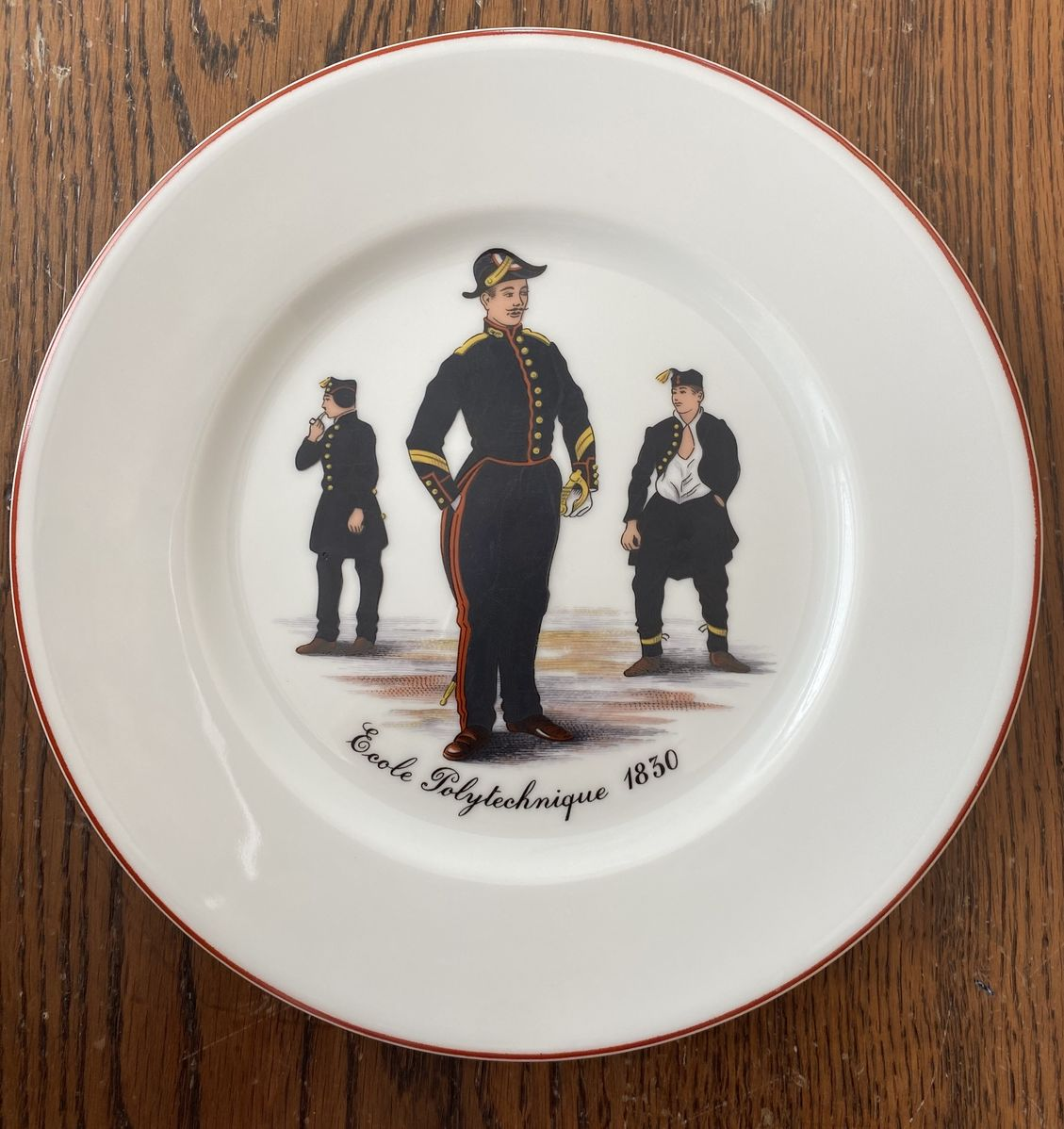
Grand Uniform of 1830.

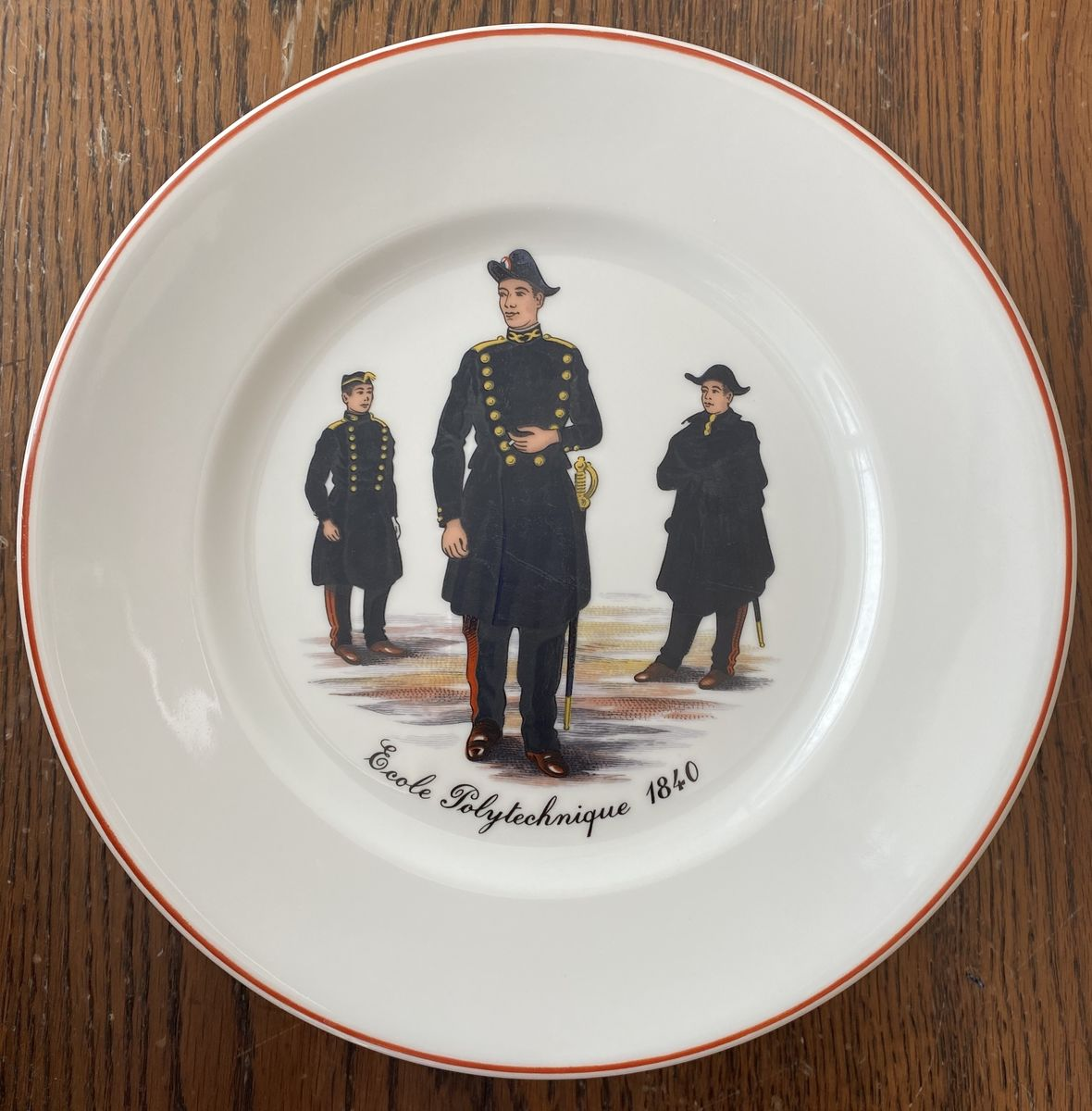
Petit Uniform of 1840.

=== From the Third to the Fifth Republic ===
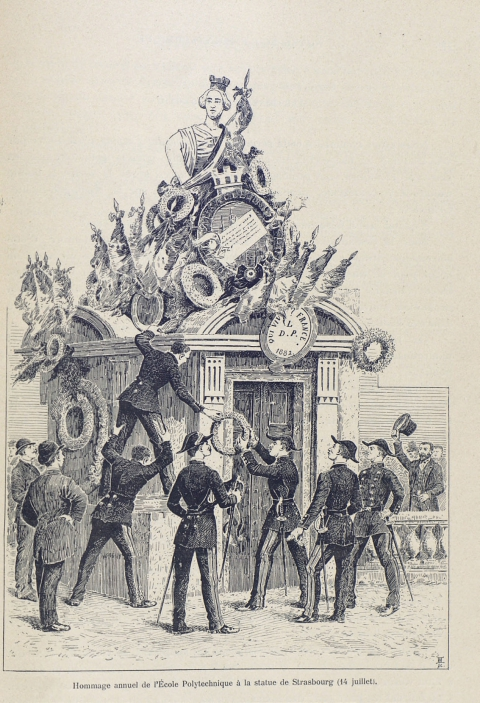
Annual tribute to the statue of Strasbourg on Place de la Concorde, July 14, 1881. (Note: This annual tribute should be considered in the context of the resentment related to the Annexation of Alsace-Lorraine in 1871.)

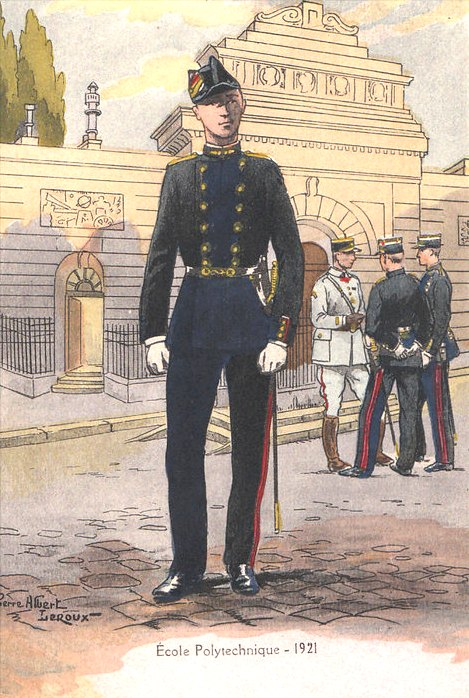
Polytechnicien in grand uniform, 1921.

France's defeat in the 1870 war led to a sweeping reform of uniforms throughout the military corps. The École Polytechnique was no exception, and from 1874, the frock coat was replaced by a black tunic with two rows of buttons, similar to that of engineering officers. In 1889, the tunic was replaced by a shorter jacket fastened at the chest with seven large uniform buttons. The rounded collar was replaced with a square-cut collar, to which a white inner collar was attached.

The Grand Uniform does not appear to have undergone significant changes under the Third Republic, except for the change of the collar insignia, which reverted from two intertwined laurel or olive branches to a grenade starting in 1903.

Starting in 1905, tensions increased between France and Germany over the division of Africa and the control of Morocco; the Tangier Crisis is a notable example of the rivalry between the two powers. In this context of European imperialist rivalry, in 1908, students of military schools were given officer cadet stripes: white alphas adorned with a red border. This measure was linked to the mass assignment of officers to troop units upon graduating from the École Polytechnique. A gold version of these alphas, associated with the rank of candidate, appeared in 1919 when students returned as promoted officers from World War I. (Note: One can even find an example of second lieutenant stripes pinned on the Grand Uniform.)

During the Nazi occupation, the École lost its military status; as a result, rank insignia were replaced by laurel branches on the uniforms of students who became civilians. Apart from this exception, the uniform was not modified. A letter from the École's commander to the Minister of War attests that the wearing of alphas was reinstated in 1945 when the École regained its military status. After the class of 1947, polytechnicians no longer had any rank insignia on their uniforms.

Until the mid-20th century, the indoor uniform was called berry referring to the Berry cloth used to make it. After World War II, it was replaced by the "Battle Dress" from British Army uniforms. This indoor uniform, commonly called "B.D.," became unpopular among students in the post-May 1968 anti-militarist and anti-authoritarian context. This sentiment was reflected in multiple "uniform strikes" — in 1972, 1975, and 1977 — initiated by students for various reasons. (Note: 1971: Protest against the "toughening of regulations and sanctions against two classmates"; 1975: Protest against sanctions imposed on four students who distributed leaflets criticizing the reform of military service for polytechnicians; 1977: Protest against sanctions against a student for "untidy attire" and insolence toward the director general of the École.) The class of X1985 finally abolished the indoor uniform, making the Grand Uniform the only uniform for polytechnicians.

The events of May 1968 also led to the temporary or permanent disappearance of many traditions at the École, including the Khômiss and the Code X, a collection of rules and traditions established by the students. In particular, it dictated how to wear the bicorne since 1852:

His hat exposes the left part of the forehead, brushes the right ear, and divides the right eyebrow in mean and extreme ratio.

— Article 1 of the Code X, 1890 edition

The expression "mean and extreme ratio" refers to the ideal proportions of the golden ratio. The Khômiss was not reestablished until 1987, and students resumed wearing the bicorne in this manner from that date.

==== Constitution of the Grand Uniform for military cadres ====
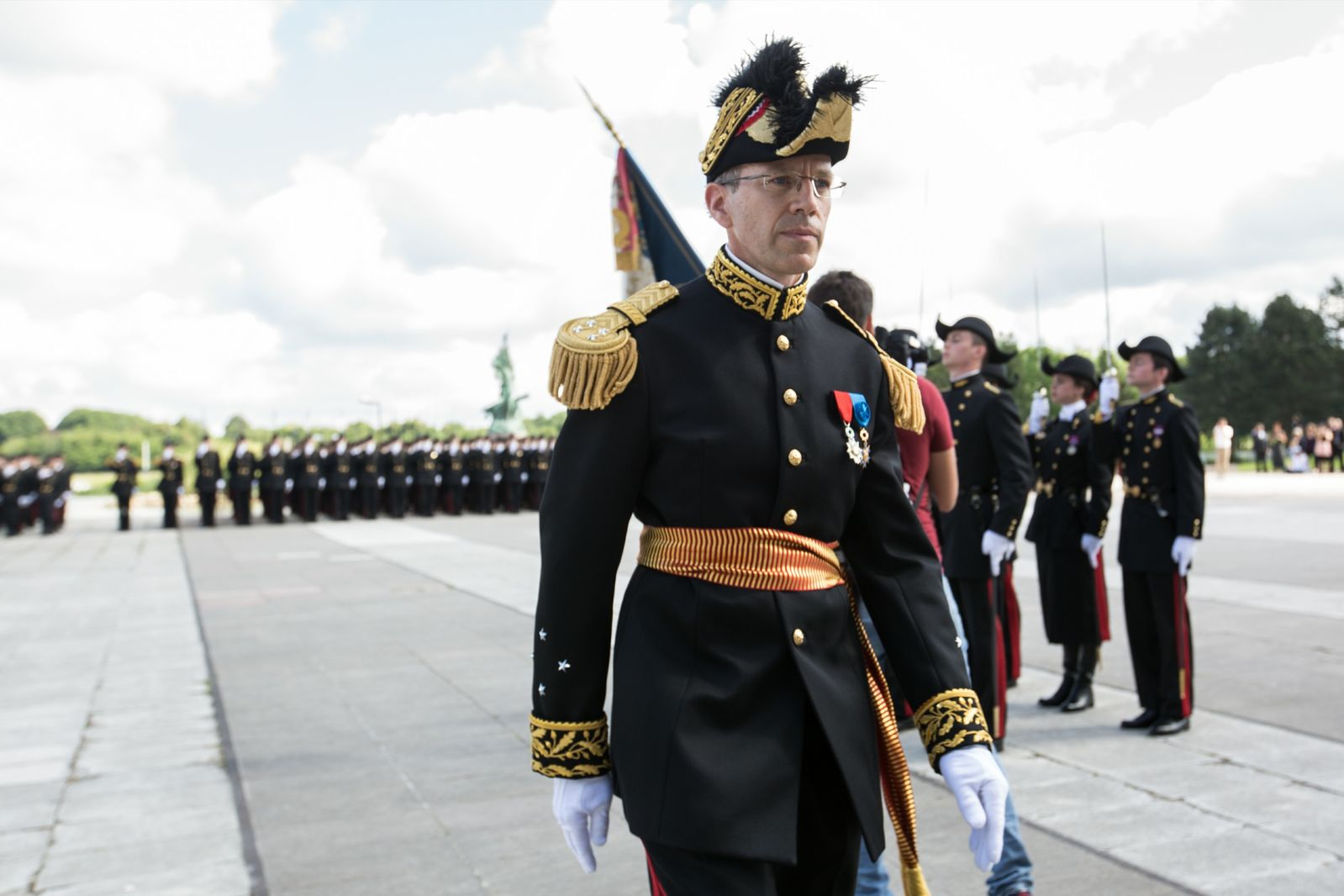
General engineer François Bouchet in full uniform (2018).

In a pursuit of uniformity, the decision to equip all officers in leadership roles with a Grand Uniform, and consequently the creation of the bicorne for cadres, (Note: Bicorne slightly higher and equipped with a wider cord: Photograph of the head of the École Polytechnique (2018).) was made in 1979. It was worn for the first time during the July 14th parade in 1980. Until then, Army officers wore the so-called "31" outfit with a kepi and saber, featuring a row of gold buttons and made of black cloth; Navy and Air Force officers wore their respective ceremonial uniforms. The Grand Uniform for non-commissioned officers, including the bicorne, dates back to 2003.

In 2018, during the departure ceremony for the X2015 class, Director General François Bouchet reintroduced the Grand Uniform for generals, (Note: On a model of Tenue 31 for officers of arms, not service officers, the Grand Uniform for generals includes a bicorne with black feathers and a red-and-gold command sash belt. Photograph of General Engineer François Bouchet wearing the Grand Uniform of a General for the first time, March 21, 2018. For comparison: Photograph of General Engineer François Bouchet at the Sainte Barbe ceremony, December 4, 2017. For a detailed description of the 31st officer's uniform, see Tenue 31, a website about French uniforms from the interwar period, "Généraux et Maréchaux" archive. For a detailed description of the 31 service officer uniform, see Tenue 31, a website about French uniforms from the interwar period, "Service des Fabrications d'Armement" archive. For photographs of a general's outfit 31 (1930): Bertrand Malvaux Antiquarian - Expert - Ancient weapons - Antiques - Militaria - Online sale "Brigadier General Lambrigot's uniform: tunic, trousers and bicorne" archive.) modeled after the uniform worn by generals between 1918 and 1940, demonstrating a commitment to preserving traditions at the École Polytechnique.

==== Women's Grand Uniform ====
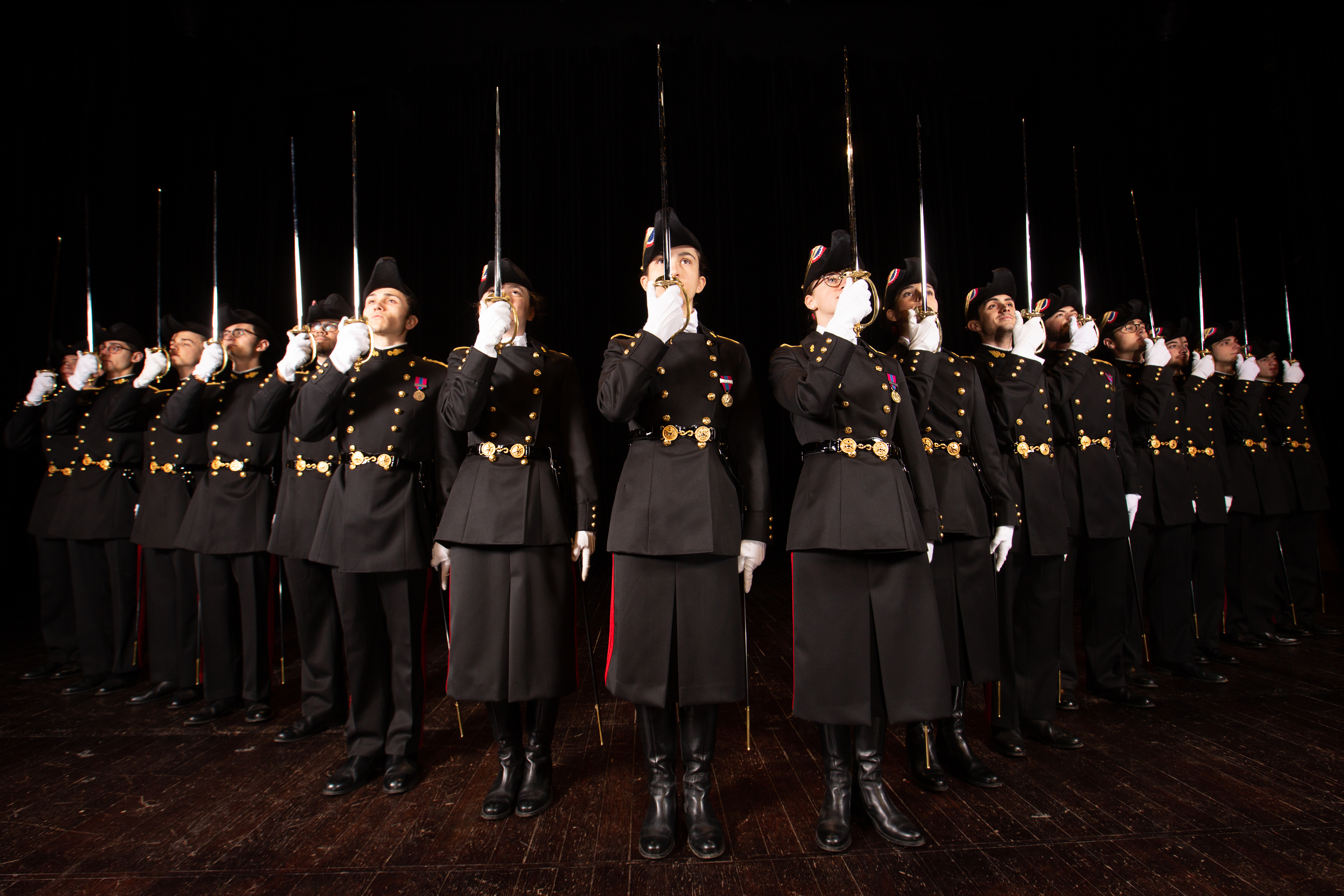
Grand Women's and Men's Uniform (X2018).

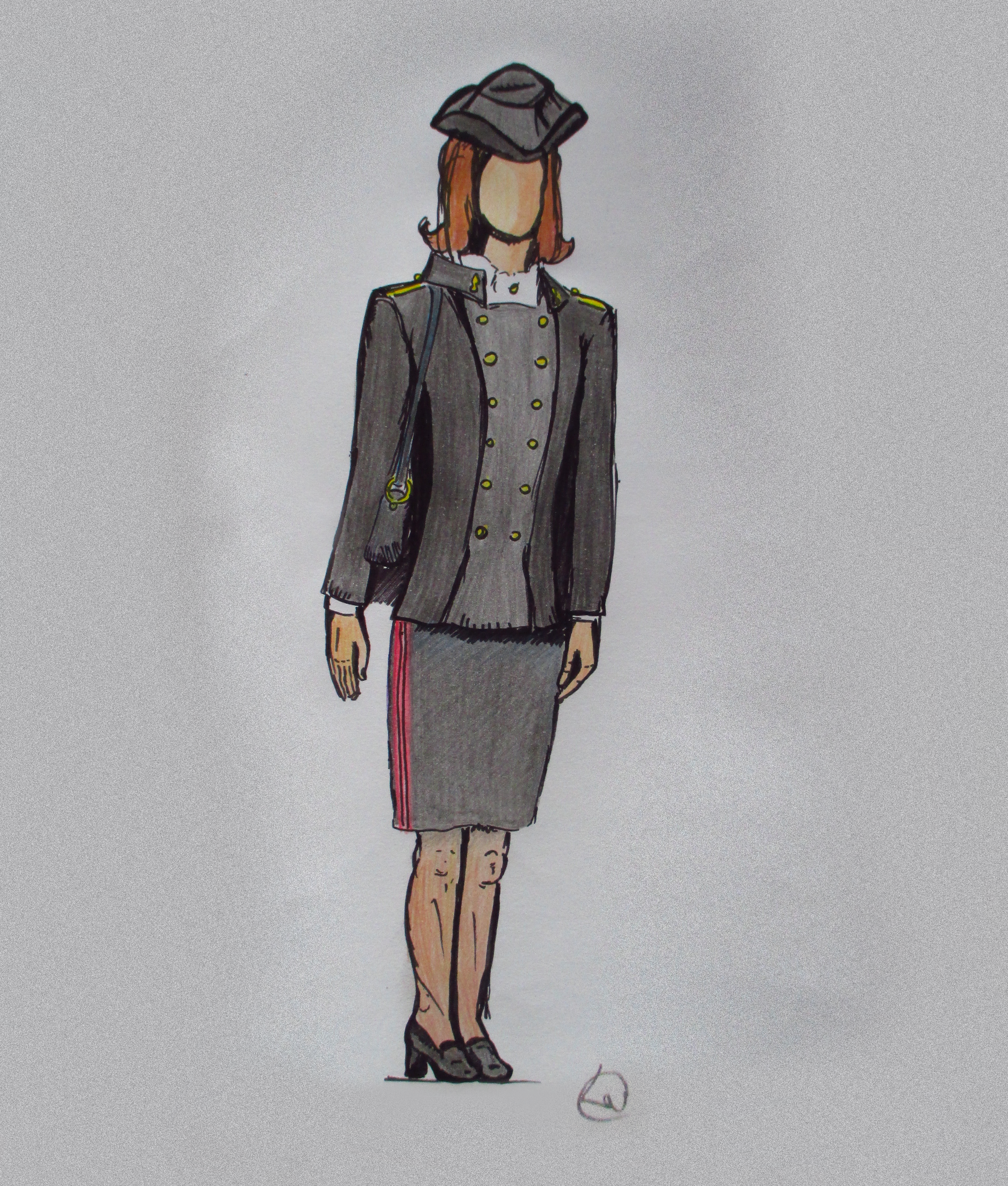
Grand Uniforme feminine, 1972.

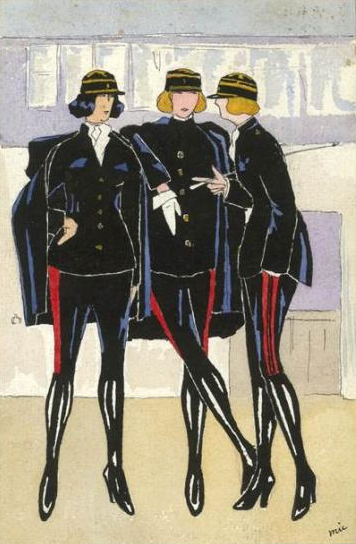
The Grand Women's Uniform designed by an X1921: trousers are not a new idea.

In 1972, the École Polytechnique entrance exam was opened to women. Consequently, they needed to be provided with a Grand Uniform. The uniform was chosen from several proposals. In his memoirs, Michel Debré claims that the model was selected by his wife. The chosen design was by couturier Paul Vauclair, who was known for dressing General de Gaulle. The first women's Grand Uniform featured a skirt, pumps, and a tricorne. The original tricorne was crafted based on a model from the Royal Navy. From the 1973 class onward, female polytechnicians received a lower tricorne adorned with a cockade and a cul-de-dé (a gold braid).

The original skirt was cut slightly above the knee. Anne Duthilleul (X1972) recalls: "Our skirt didn't go past the knee, but in the era of miniskirts, it already seemed quite long to us." It was lengthened in 1974 to cover the knee. Legend has it that the wife of General Briquet (X1938), uncomfortable at the sight of the bare knees of female polytechnicians, convinced her husband. The 1974 technical manual thus specified that "the length of the skirt is determined so that the hem stops at mid-knee." Fashion had also changed; as early as 1970, Paris Match headlined "The Miniskirt is Dead." After pumps were replaced by boots, the skirt was lengthened further to cover the exposed part of the leg, and was widened accordingly to allow for marching in step—resulting in an aesthetic outcome that was not universally appreciated.

The first female polytechnicians were denied the right to wear the tangente, a polytechnician slang term for the sword, which had become a symbol of the École since 1830. Instead, they were given a black handbag, not used during ceremonies. Starting in 1977, female polytechnicians were finally permitted to wear the tangente and thus wore the sword belt.

The first Grand Uniform for women included pumps. The first ceremony, held on November 11, 1972, took place in cold weather. The female polytechnicians reportedly requested warmer footwear, and from the X1976 class onward, pumps were replaced by boots. Another explanation, supported by uniformology and the simultaneous nature of events, suggests that as soon as the sword was granted to female polytechnicians, the pumps had to be replaced by boots. The first boots were form-fitting and featured a 4 cm, wide, flat heel. A few years later, around 1986, wider boots with a lower, stacked heel were adopted. Around 2000, slim-fitting Paraboot boots with thick soles and zippers were introduced, though they were not universally liked. (Note: The first series of boots were made by a master bootmaker from Satory for a high price (around 3,000 francs, more than 800 €), until the arrival of cavalry boots in the 1990s and later, the Paraboot model in the 2000s. It seems the evolution of heel height was gradual: the 4 cm heel of the tube boots was replaced by a more tapered 3 cm heel around 1986, and then the boots evolved into a "cavalry" model with flat 2.5 cm heels around 1990.)

The red scrunchie quickly appeared to standardize the hairstyles of young women.

In 1996, female polytechnicians were granted the right to wear the bicorne—an iconic symbol of the École—replacing the tricorne. Representing the X1994 class, Caroline Aigle and Marie Bayrou—the daughter of François Bayrou, then Minister of National Education—advocated for this change in the office of the Director General.

For aesthetic and uniformity reasons, the skirt was replaced by trousers for the 2020 class of female polytechnicians. This choice was also influenced by fashion trends: in 2017, Dior's Spring-Summer collection reinterpreted the women's Grand Uniform with a mandarin collar and trousers.

== Polytechnician slang and the Grand Uniform ==
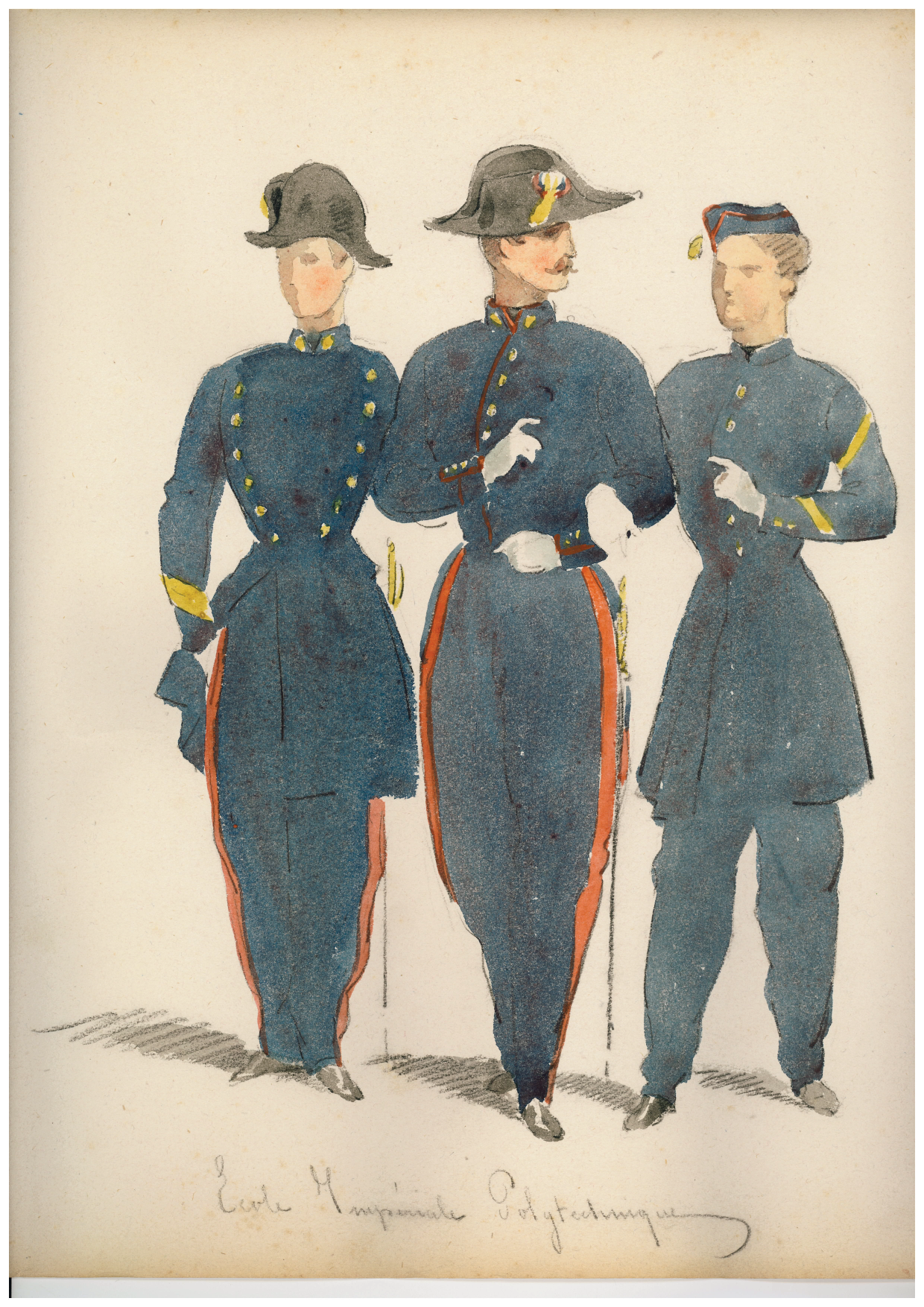
Polytechnicians in uniform, Second Empire. On the left, sergeant-major stripes; on the right, quartermaster stripes. (Note: The quartermaster stripes were awarded based on merit.)

As demonstrated by the term "tangente," polytechnician slang has embraced the Grand Uniform. The following examples, some of which fell out of use in the 20th century, show that the reverse is also true: the Grand Uniform influenced the slang of the X.

=== Top of the Class: "major de promotion" ===
The top fifty students in the entrance exam, who served as barracks leaders, were appointed sergeants. The top-ranking student was named sergent-major, which is the origin of the expression "major de promotion." They wore rank insignia on their uniforms: two diagonal stripes for sergeant-majors and one for sergeants.

=== Foreign students: "constants" ===
From 1794 until the early 20th century, the few foreign students at the X were considered auditors, not full polytechnicians. As a result, they did not receive the school's uniform and, in particular, were not issued the tangente. This led to a mathematical pun referencing the geometric term "tangent."

Having a null tangent, they are constants.

— Polytechnician Slang, Albert-Lévy and G. Pinet (1894)

The term "constant" fell out of use after 1921, when foreign students were admitted to the entrance exam and received the complete uniform.

=== Courtyard entry, a boîte à claque ===
The bicorne was cumbersome to carry. For a time, a foldable model existed that could flatten, and the onomatopoeia "clac," mimicking the sound the hat made when folding, earned it the nickname claque. The name stuck even after the foldable model was discontinued. (Note: The term "frigate" was also used in the past.)

The bicorne was stored in a trapezoidal box resembling the shape of the entrance courtyard of the École at 5 rue Descartes in Paris. As a result, this small courtyard became known as the boîte à claque.

=== Military service: cuirs and zincs ===
At the beginning of the 20th century, some students completed their military service in their first year, while others did so in their second year. In 1903, the École considered issuing bronzed steel scabbards to students, replacing the previously used blackened leather scabbards. Consequently, first-year students received leather scabbards, while those who arrived a year later after serving in the troops received metallic scabbards, nicknamed zincs. By metonymy, the term cuirs (leathers) referred to students who entered the École directly, while zincs referred to those who arrived a year later after military service. For the 1906 to 1912 classes, cuirs were distinguished in the school's directory by the mention "c." The designation gradually faded away as the metallic scabbard was distributed to all students.

=== Red and yellow: origins of class colors ===
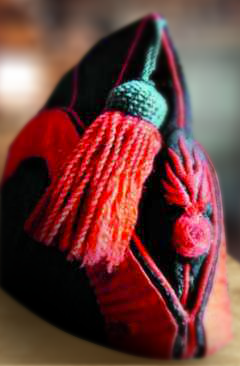
Side cap with red tassel, early 19th century (Sapper).

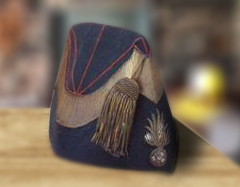
Non-commissioned officer's police cap with gold tassel, 19th century.

At the École Polytechnique, even-numbered class years are known as rôujes (reds), while odd-numbered years are jônes (yellows). This tradition stems from the history of the École's uniform.

It dates back to 1823, during the Restoration, when the École regained its military status. Students were issued two hats: the bicorne and the bonnet de police—the first was worn with the Grand Uniform, and the second with the Petit Uniforme. (Note: The regulation follows that of 1804 on this point.)

The bonnet de police was adorned with a tuft of threads. In the French Navy, this tuft evolved into the pompom of the sailor cap, while it became a decorative tassel on the bonnet de police.

In their second year, (Note: The École Polytechnique used to be a 2-year program, except for repeating a year. Nowadays, the program lasts 3 years, with an additional year of specialization in the 4th year.) students transitioned from the red-tasseled bonnet de police to the elegant gold-tasseled cap of non-commissioned officers, (Note: The bicorne of the École Polytechnique itself is of the non-commissioned officer model: from the beginning, the uniform of the X was designed based on the model of a non-commissioned officer's uniform.) marking their promotion to sergeants: "elegant bonnet de police with a golden tassel."

In 1843, polytechnicians were equipped with a kepi. Though they still received a bonnet, they were no longer permitted to leave the École wearing it. This change had two effects on students who paid for their equipment:

- The "gold" tassel was replaced with a less expensive yellow one. (Note: The term "jonquil" is also used to refer to yellow in the texts.)
- It became unnecessary to switch caps after the first year.

Thus, the rôuje and jône, originally designations for first and second-year students, began alternating between even and odd-numbered years at an indeterminate date between 1843 and 1858:

I received a claque hat and a red-tasseled bonnet de police. The red tassel was the characteristic of my class, while the older students had yellow tassels.

— Memoirs of Joseph Barba (X1858)

In 1874, the bonnet de police was permanently replaced by a kepi known as the "small dress" kepi. It was decided that the grenade emblem would alternate between red and yellow depending on the parity of the graduating class. (Note: The minister makes an error when writing the regulation, stating "it is jonquil for first-year students and scarlet for second-year students.") The 1887 regulation established that: "On the front of the band is placed a grenade (height 25 mm), embroidered in jonquil yellow wool for students of one division; in scarlet wool for students of the other division, alternating in this manner."

Therefore, the piping on the interior kepi also adopted the color associated with the promotion's class year.

== See also ==
- Traditions of the École Polytechnique

== Bibliography ==
- Les Français peints par eux-mêmes. L'Armée, les écoles militaires, le garde national [The French as painted by themselves. The Army, military schools, the national guard] (in French). Paris: Curmer. 1840.
- Bradley, Margaret (1975). "Scientific Education versus Military Training : The influence of Napoleon Bonaparte on the École Polytechnique". Annals of Science. 32 (5): 415–449. doi:10.1080/00033797500200381.
- Callot, Jean-Pierre (1993). Histoire et prospective de l'École Polytechnique [History and future of the École Polytechnique] (in French). Lavauzelle. ISBN 978-2-7025-0350-8.
- Claris, Gaston (1895). Notre École polytechnique [Our École polytechnique] (in French). Paris: Libraires-Imprimeurs réunis. pp. 242–270. OCLC 36486999.
- Cyna, Michèle (2013). Femmes de Progrès – Femmes de polytechnique [Women of Progress – Women of Polytechnic] (in French). Paris: AX éditeur.
- Guillaume, James (1891). Procès-verbaux du Comité d'instruction publique de la Convention nationale [Minutes of the Public Instruction Committee of the National Convention] (in French). Vol. 5. Paris.
- Karvar, Anousheh; Pestre, Dominique (1997). La formation des élites scientifiques et techniques étrangères à l'École polytechnique aux XIXe et XXe siècles [The training of foreign scientific and technical elites at the École polytechnique in the 19th and 20th centuries] (PhD in Education Sciences) (in French). Atelier national de reproduction des thèses.
- Albert-Lévy; Pinet, G (1894). L'Argot de l'X : illustré par les X [L'Argot de l'X: illustrated by the Xs] (in French). Paris: Émile Testard.
- Lienhart, Constant; Humbert, René (1989). Les Uniformes de l'armée française de 1690 à 1894 [The Uniforms of the French Army from 1690 to 1894] (in French). Saint-Aignan: Éd. DA.
- Margerand, Joseph (2002). Les Coiffures de l'armée française [The Hairstyles of the French Army]. Le Livre chez vous (in French). Strasbourg: Éd. Coprur. ISBN 2914288093. OCLC 470233268.
- Rollet, Laurent (2017). Rollet, Laurent (ed.). "La correspondance de jeunesse d'Henri Poincaré : les années de formation. De l'École polytechnique à l'École des mines (1873–1878)" [Henri Poincaré's youthful correspondence: the formative years. From the École polytechnique to the École des mines (1873–1878)]. Annals of Science. Birkhäuser. doi:10.1007/978-3-319-55959-9. ISBN 978-3-319-55958-2.
- Thooris, Marie-Christine; de Fuentes, Madeleine; Billoux, Claudine; Barande, Jérémy (2003). Le Grand Uniforme des élèves de l'École polytechnique : de 1794 à nos jours [The Great Uniform of the students of the École polytechnique: from 1794 to the present day] (in French). Panazol: Charles Lavauzelle. ISBN 2702510507. OCLC 470004381.
