= Traditions of the École Polytechnique =

Evolving military-inspired traditions

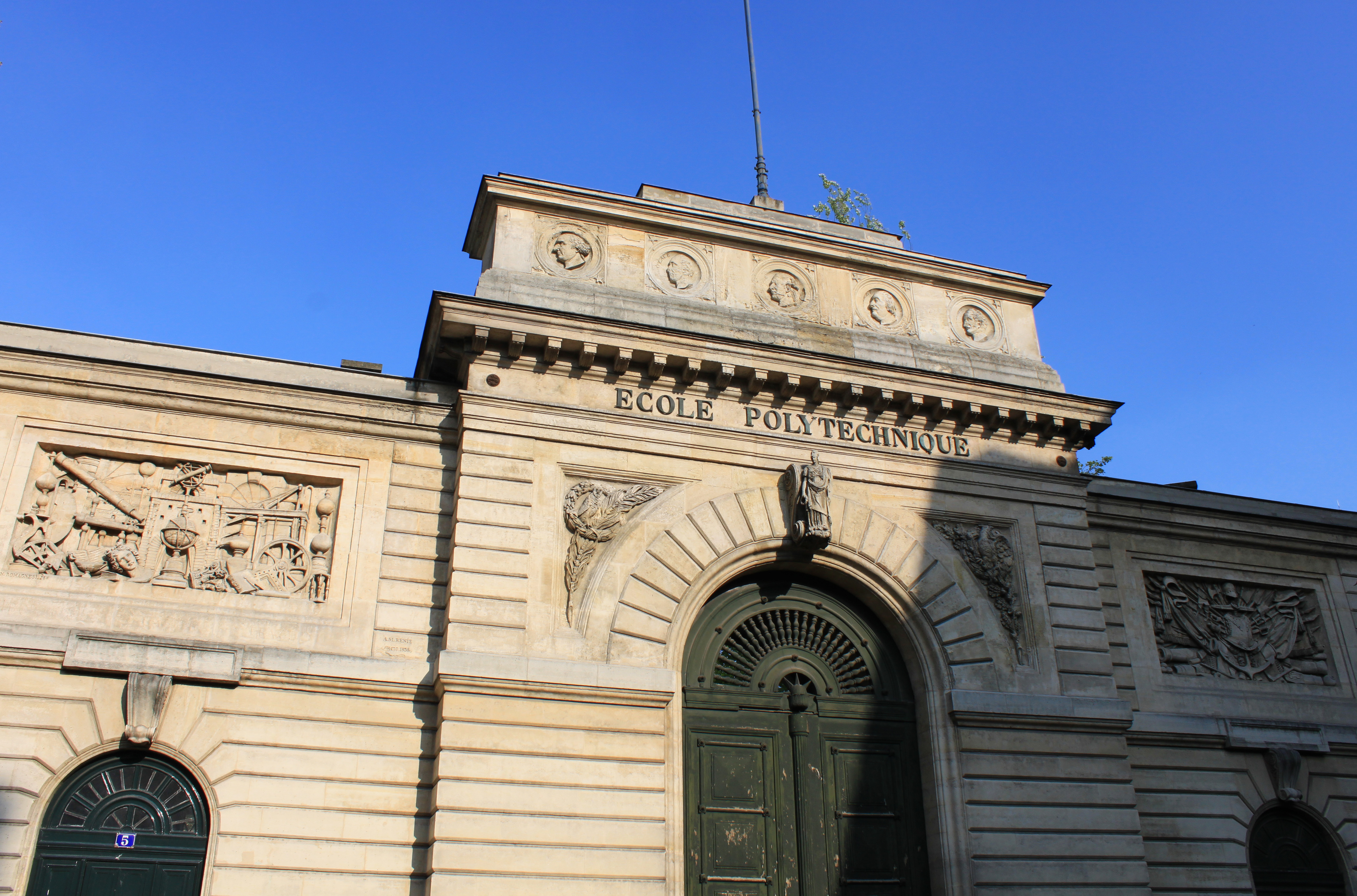
Pediment of the historic buildings, rue Descartes in Paris.

The traditions of the École Polytechnique mostly originated during the militarization of the school by Napoleon I in 1804. They are constantly evolving, except for the loss of some traditions between 1968 and 1985. These various traditions shape the school and influence its representation in the collective imagination in France.

== Esprit de Corps ==
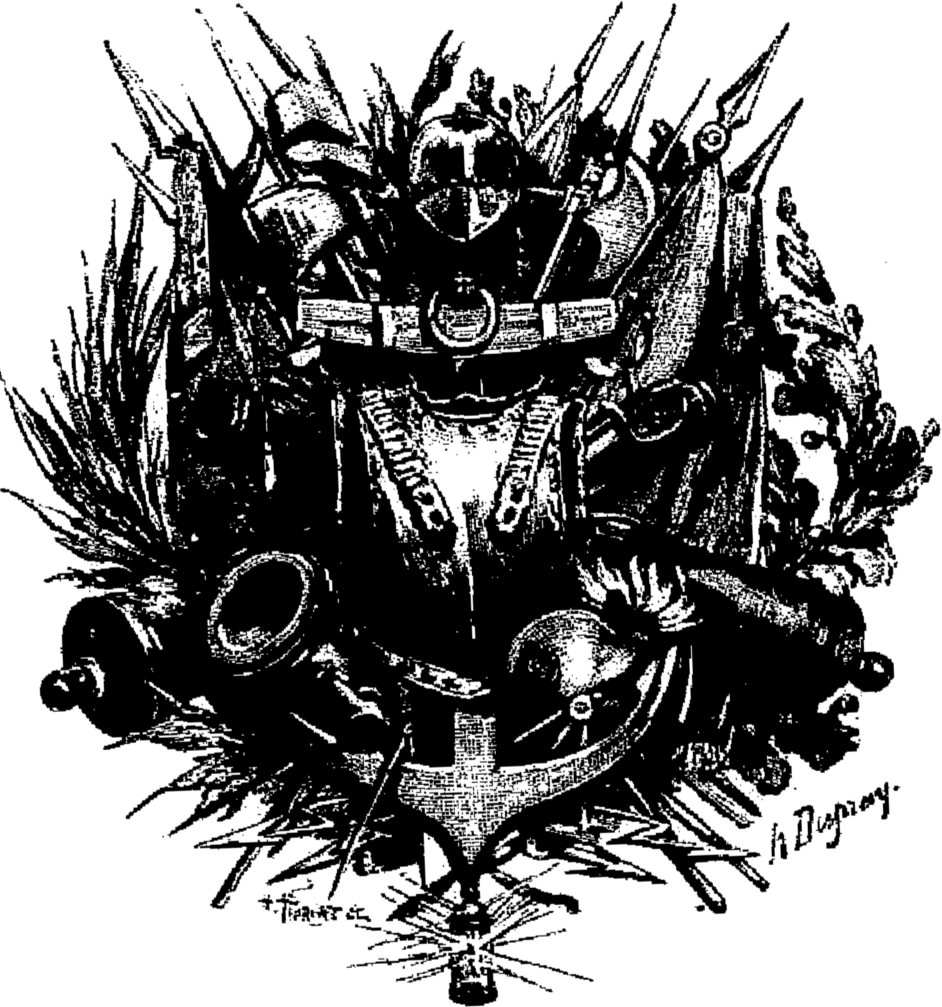
Coat of arms of the École Polytechnique, designed by Henri Dupray, engraved by Henri Thiriat, in the Histoire de l'École polytechnique by Gaston Pinet, Paris, 1887.

The first of these traditions is the entrance exam, a rite of passage. It is followed by other traditions, most of which emerged with the militarization of the school in 1804 and evolved afterward. However, in 1968, the most significant traditions—such as bahutage and the Code X—were lost. Furthermore, when the school was relocated to Palaiseau in 1976, the administration shifted the military service so that the 1974 and 1975 classes never met. This change, intended to prevent disorder during the relocation, which was very unpopular among students, led to the loss of the last remaining traditions. Nevertheless, starting in 1985, traditions, particularly the bahutage and the Khômiss, were revived.

The different traditions structure the polytechnicien's journey and contribute to constructing a group identity. The "esprit de corps" of polytechniciens thus tends to constitute a genuine "State within the State."

An old rule of etiquette requires that students address each other informally if they belong to classes less than ten years apart or at the initiative of the elder in cases of a more significant gap.

== Incorporation ==
The incorporation of students (formerly called initiation, absorption, bahutage, hazing, or "cryptage") has its origins in the militarization of the school. Indeed, as early as the second year of militarization, what was then called initiation began:

The seniors demanded signs of respect from the conscripts (as they began to be called, a name that stuck), sometimes imposing them by force. Bizarre scientific questions were posed to them. They were subjected to countless vexations—jeers, soaking, the confiscation and destruction of barracks, clothing, or study materials, the contamination of dormitories, and especially tipping and punishments. These initiations were masked under the guise of games, yet they sometimes led to assaults and duels. They usually lasted two months, from November to January, after which the seniors treated the newcomers as equals.

During the Restoration, the administration sought to abolish initiation, but failing to do so, it eventually chose to turn a blind eye to these practices. As a result, initiations became public. They lasted two months, from November to January, and concluded with a ceremony that parodied the school's authorities. Around 1840, despite concerns from the Prefect of Police, initiations continued but were renamed "absorption." Then in 1871, absorption, without undergoing significant changes, became "bahutage." There were no modifications until 1939. The key ceremonies were the "amphigueules" and the "séance des Cotes." During the amphigueules, conscripts were subjected to the mockery of their seniors (including puns on certain surnames), while the "séance des Cotes" was an opportunity for the Khômiss to assign grades and rewards to the newcomers (top and bottom of the class, tallest and shortest students, most conceited, etc.). This session was followed by the reading of the Code X and the awarding of tangents. Another tradition was the "monômes": students were gathered and led in single file in a frenzied race through the school's buildings, courtyards, and cellars. A route through the sewers or catacombs was carried out under similar conditions, marked by paint checkpoints where the Khômiss would coat the entire class in the color of the seniors. After World War II, the duration of the "bahutage" was reduced to less than a week, and two new traditions emerged: "deportation" and the "treasure hunt." The "deportation" involved abducting a conscript during the night, transporting them by car to a distant location from where they had to return on their own before morning roll call. The "treasure hunt" was a game in which conscripts, divided into teams, had to bring back bizarre and unusual objects requested by a jury of seniors. The end of the "bahutage" was marked by a "magnan de la réconciliation," an amicable evening between the two classes.

This tradition was interrupted from 1968 to 1985. In June 1968, an amended "bahutage" project for October 1968 was adopted by the 1967 class. However, this project was never implemented due to the 1967 class being sent to military application schools in October 1968. The "bahutage" for the 1968 class was reduced to a nocturnal "visit" to the school's underground passages. Thus, the tradition of "bahutage" was discontinued. The current incorporation, gradually reinstated from 1985 onwards, is organized by the Khômiss and the Kès. It draws inspiration from the "cryptage" as it existed on the Montagne Sainte-Geneviève but now lasts one week. It begins with an initial prank to liven up the first intervention of the new Promotion Commander. Next comes the "Night of the Undergrounds," an adaptation of the former visit to the Parisian catacombs. This event consists of a full evening organized by the Khômiss and supervised by students. During this evening, the "très obligés successeurs" (TOS) are given a tour of the school's underground passages, interspersed with a speech from the GénéK and followed by sharing a glass of hot wine at the BôBar. At the end of the week, a treasure hunt is organized in Paris. Finally, the Khômiss has adapted the "parachuting" (formerly known as deportation) to today's incorporation. Now, the top-ranked student of the MP track and the bottom-ranked student of the PC track must reach the military camp of La Courtine on their own, starting from the location where they were abandoned by the Khômiss (Ventimiglia in 2011, the Jura or Amsterdam in previous years).

Simultaneously with their own incorporation, the students of the new class visit their former preparatory school to cause disruptions. This tradition dates back at least to 1913. At the time, it took place at night, and the polytechnicians covered walls and boards with large Xs.

== Uniform ==
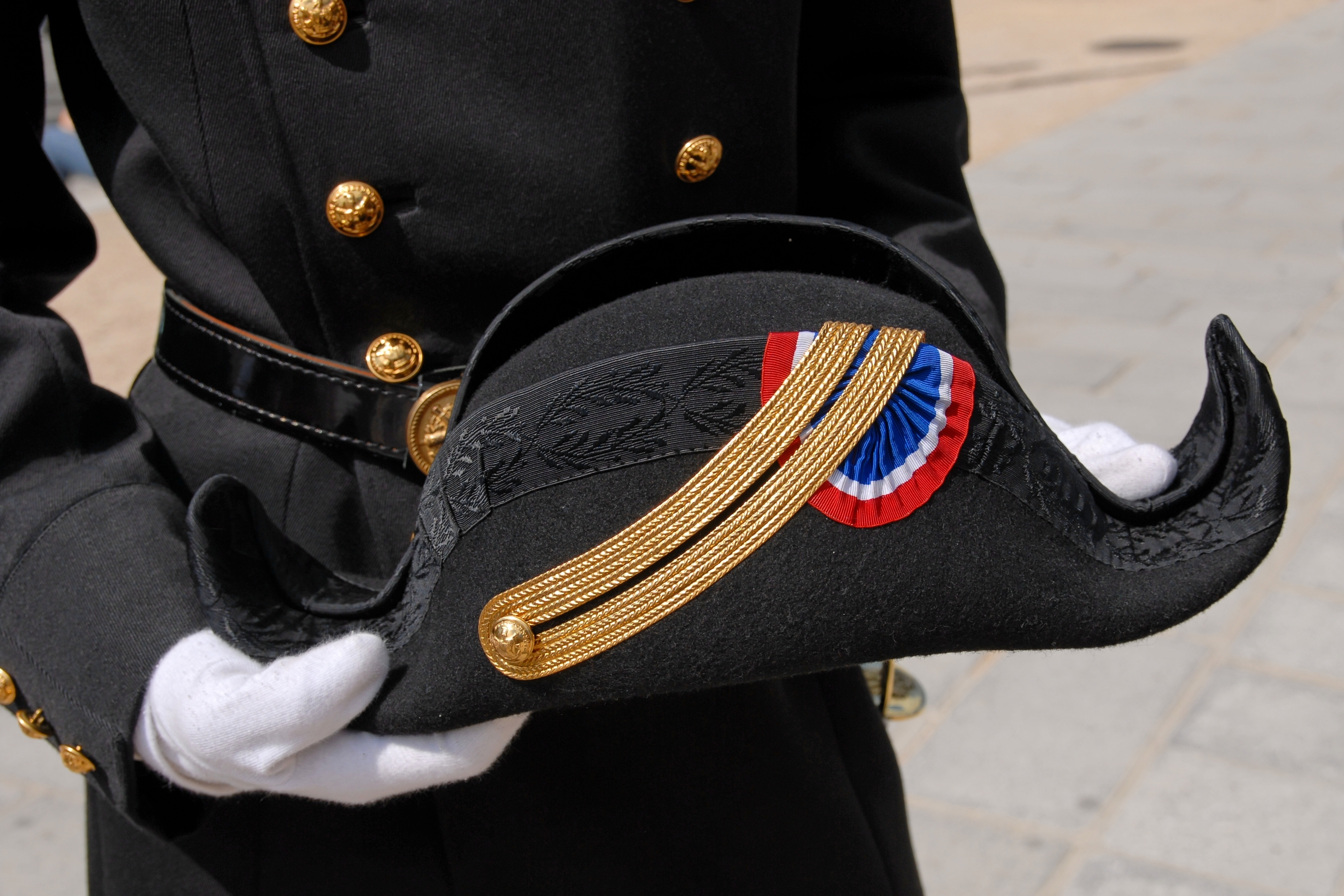
Bicorne.

All engineering students (French or otherwise) have a specific uniform unique to the École Polytechnique, called the "Grand Uniform" or "GU," which is custom-made. It notably includes a bicorne hat and a sword called the "tangente." The uniform is worn during military ceremonies and other events such as the École Polytechnique Ball. Students no longer wear the uniform during lessons, except for important conferences with guest speakers. The uniform has undergone numerous changes throughout history. The current uniform is made by the Balsan company, costing €1,300. Since women were admitted to the École Polytechnique in 1972, a female version of the uniform has been available. Women wore a tricorne hat until 1996, when it was replaced by a bicorne identical to the men's. The skirt of the female uniform, introduced in 1972, evolved over the years until it was replaced by trousers for the X2020 class.

In the popular imagination, the École Polytechnique is symbolized by the Grand Uniform and its accessories (bicorne hats and swords), which are particularly showcased during the July 14th parade.

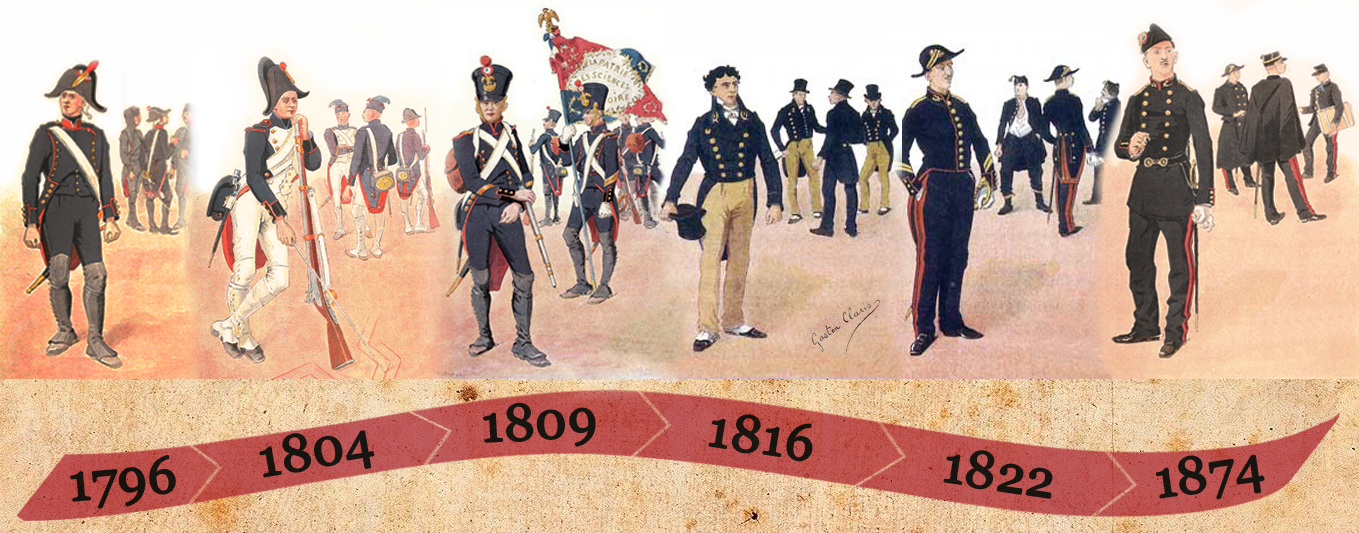
Evolution of the Great Uniform of the École polytechnique from 1796 to 1874.

Originally, students were classified as National Guardsmen, under the supervision of the Ministry of the Interior, and were required to wear the artillery uniform of the National Guard (a tricolor cockade hat worn crosswise and a saber). However, this measure was never implemented due to a lack of resources. A decree from Thermidor Year IV (August 1796) prescribed the following uniform: a coat closed with five buttons, cut in the French style, a waistcoat and trousers in national blue, and a three-cornered hat. From 1804 to 1809, students wore the first type of "First Empire" uniform (a tricolor cockade hat worn crosswise and a saber, plus an infantry rifle with a bayonet). From 1809 to 1815, they wore the "First Empire" uniform (second type) with a shako, saber or briquet, and an infantry rifle with a bayonet. During the Restoration, they wore the "frac." Under Louis XVIII, they wore a top hat and then returned to a military uniform (a black wool coat and a bicorne hat worn in a column—similar to the current uniform) under Charles X. At that time, only sergeants carried the sword, but from 1830 onward, all students did.

== July 14th parade ==
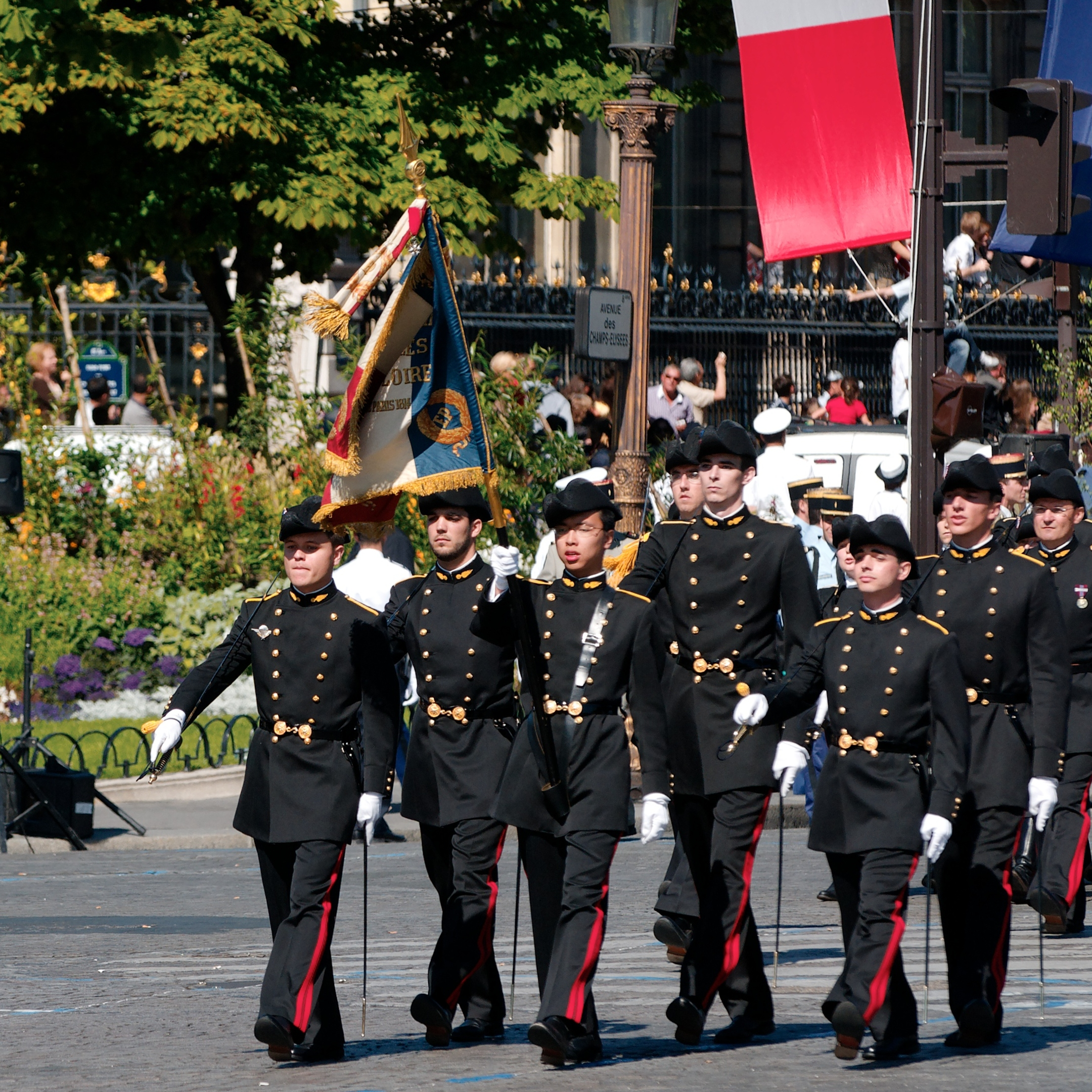
The flag guard of the School, during the military parade of July 14, 2008.

A delegation of students from the École Polytechnique has marched at the head of the French Army on the Champs-Élysées every July 14th since the presidency of Sadi Carnot in 1887. The commanding officer leads a unit composed of 260 people. Until 1994, this parade was an opportunity for playful pranks, often nodding to current events. Tradition also holds that various objects were occasionally dropped to disrupt the cadence of the cadets from the École Spéciale Militaire de Saint-Cyr, who marched right behind them. The administration made every effort to prevent these disruptions, and now the officers from the École des Officiers de la Gendarmerie Nationale are positioned between Saint-Cyr and Polytechnique.

Among the most memorable pranks, in 1983, some students wore sunglasses; in 1989, tricolor smoke bombs were released; in 1991, students wore bouquets of watercress on their sashes in homage to Édith Cresson, the then-Prime Minister; in 1992, they sported stickers in European Union colors on their bicorne hats in honor of the Maastricht Treaty; and in 1994, a red ribbon symbolizing the fight against AIDS was worn.

== Flag and motto ==
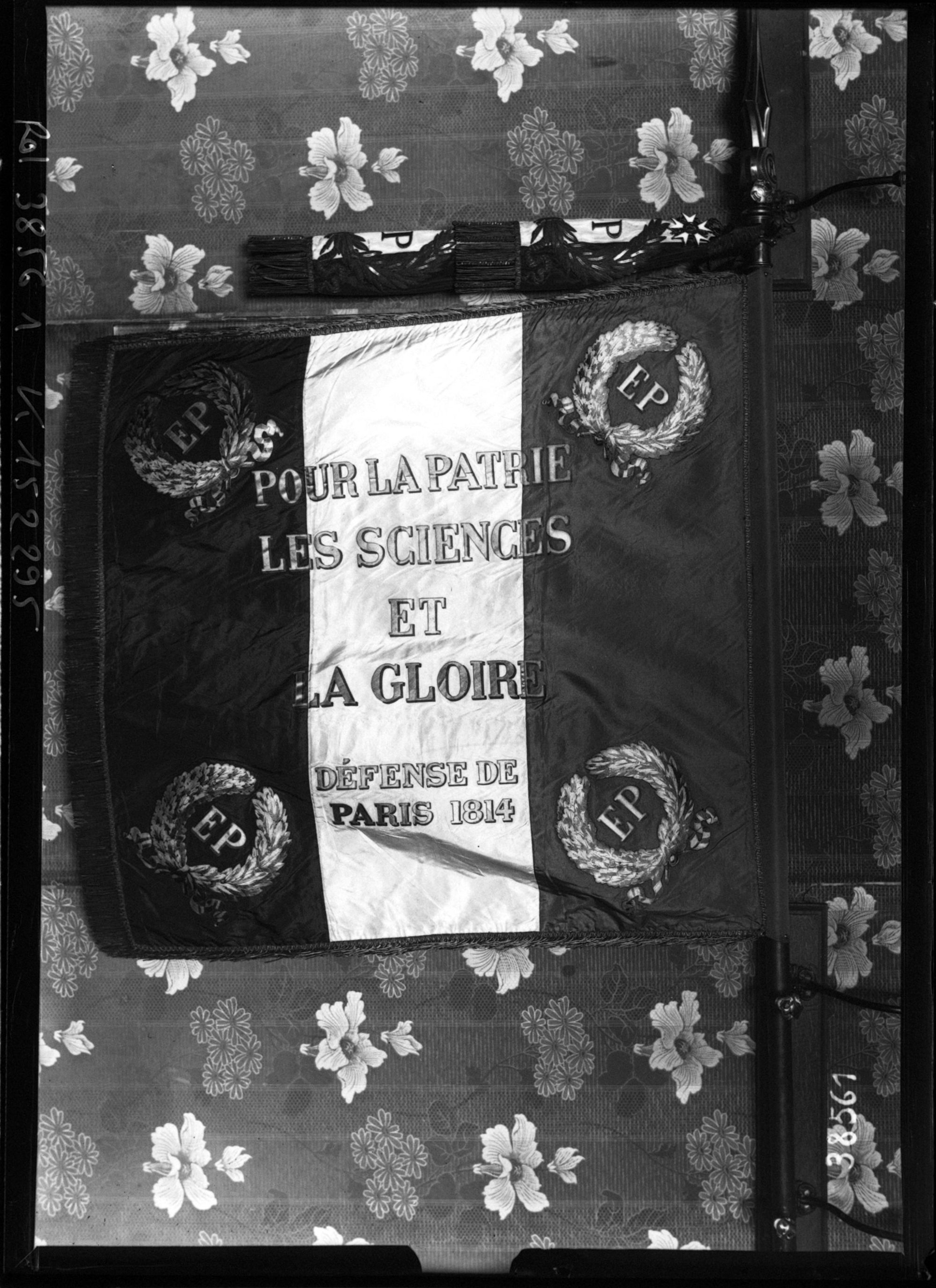
Reverse of the flag of the École polytechnique.

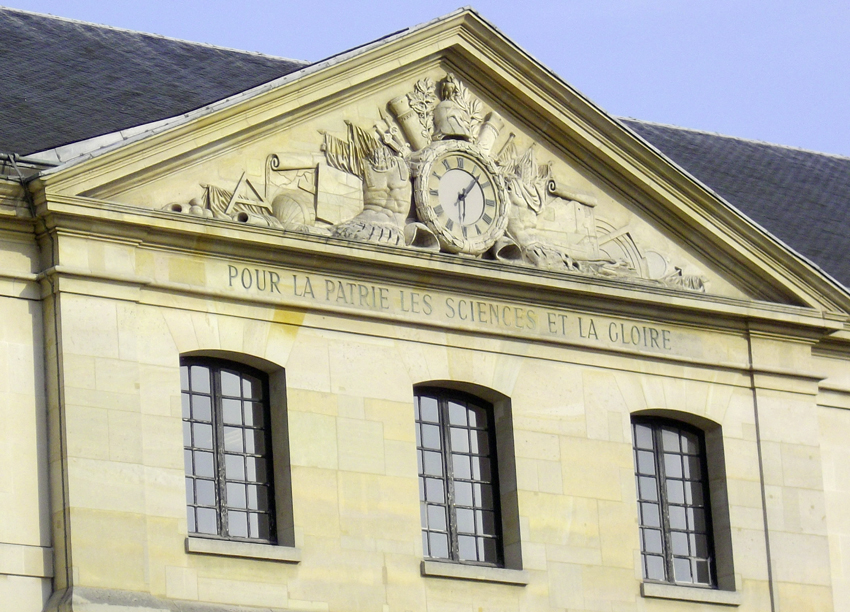
“For the fatherland, science and glory”, on the pediment of the Joffre pavilion, Jardin Carré, Paris.

The battalion of the École Polytechnique received its flag during the distribution of the eagles at the Champ-de-Mars on December 5, 1804. Tradition claims it was presented to François Arago by Napoleon. The school's motto, “For the Homeland, Science, and Glory,” was embroidered on this flag. Since the Battle of Paris (March 31, 1814), the flag has borne the sole battle honor: "Defense of Paris, 1814." After Louis XVIII had restored the white flag of the Monarchy by the ordinance of May 12, 1814, the students burned their flag in the school's courtyard. (Note: "An emotional patriotic ceremony has just taken place: the polytechnicians have been given back their flag, which they had not had since 1814. After defending it against the allies at the gates of Paris, they had, upon the Restoration, burned it in the School's courtyard. Arago, first sergeant of his class, had received it, before all his assembled comrades, from the very hands of Napoleon in 1805. The new flag bears, like the old one, on one side: 'For the Homeland, the Sciences, and Glory'; on the other side is inscribed: 'Defense of Paris 1814.' M. Loubet, accompanied by M. Combarieu, General Dubois, Colonel Silvestre, the Minister of War, and M. Crozier, Chief of Protocol, handed it over in the School's courtyard to M. Japiot, major of the class. The music of a line regiment played the Marseillaise, while the students presented arms. After the president withdrew, having attended a few moments of M. Becquerel’s physics class, the flag was taken to the apartment of General Debatisse, the School's commander. It will emerge on July 14th for the grand review of the national holiday, and Parisians will salute it, carried by these young men so proud to have received it and so worthy to keep it." ("Le Petit Journal". April 7, 1901. pp. 1 & 7. Archived from the original on February 5, 2023.).) On March 23, 1901, in the school's courtyard, the second flag of the École Polytechnique was presented to Marcel Louis Jean Japiot (1879-1961), top of his class, by President Émile Loubet, accompanied by General André, Minister of War.

On April 22, 1914, at Vincennes, the polytechnicians attended the presentation of the Legion of Honor insignia to the flagpole of the school's flag, in the presence of President Raymond Poincaré, King George V and Queen Mary of England, the British Foreign Minister, and the Russian ambassador. On May 19, 1922, the school received the War Cross 1914-1918 with the following citation: "The École Polytechnique, through the science and heroism of the officers it trained, contributed most gloriously to the success of our arms; it proved itself worthy, during the Great War, of its proud and noble past." In 1949, in the presence of General Pierre Brisac, commander of the school, René Pleven, Minister of National Defense, pinned the War Cross 1939-1945 to the flag of the École Polytechnique, based on a citation in the army's orders from November 21, 1949: "The École Polytechnique, faithful to its prestigious past, trained a host of leaders who, through their high culture, patriotism, and elevated sense of duty, were among the finest artisans of France's liberation and rebirth during the 1939-1945 war; it contributed to victory at the cost of numerous sacrifices, both in the military and in the Resistance, and thus earned new titles to the nation's gratitude."

In October, a few months after the new promotion arrives at Palaiseau, the flag presentation ceremony takes place. The following year, in April, the flag handover ceremony was held.

The so-called "Napoleon flag," either a facsimile or the original flag presented in 1804, is preserved in the Conseil Hall of the École, in very poor condition and encased in glass. Before this flag, each new polytechnician signs their military contract upon incorporation, committing to serve the state for a period of 10 years.

== Colors ==
Two groups of engineering students are present simultaneously at the École Polytechnique: "yellow" and "red" promotion. In the past, it was possible to tell to which promotion a student belonged by looking at the color of the trim on their internal uniform: yellow for those who entered in an odd year and red for those who entered in an even year. Although the internal uniforms have long disappeared, the tradition of calling students from odd-numbered years "yellow" and those from even-numbered years "red" has continued. A student's promotion corresponds to their year of entry to the school, unlike in many other engineering schools. The two colors, red and yellow, have now become part of the École's identity and can be seen on the official logo of the alumni association. The promotion color is also displayed inside the bicorne hat, on the ribbon where the student's matriculation number is inscribed, which generally corresponds to the student's entrance rank. Students who have been part of two consecutive promotions (for example, due to repeating a year) are called "orange" because they are both yellow and red.

== Patronage ==
The patroness saint of the École Polytechnique is Saint Barbara, celebrated on December 4. She is the patroness saint of firefighters, miners, artillerymen, and sappers. The celebration of Saint Barbara at the Old School marked the grand reconciliation—the end of one promotion's bahutage (initiation) by another.

== La Khômiss ==
The Khômiss (Note: Also spelled Khomiss, Kommiss, or Commiss.) is a student group that has existed since 1811-1812, despite a hiatus between 1966 and 1986. Formerly known as "commiss," its name comes from the commission des cotes, following an apocope and orthographic specialization, as the Khômiss organized the séance des cotes: a comedic ceremony marking the end of the bahutage, during which distinctions such as cote major, cote bébé, cote binette, etc., were awarded. It consists of around ten members, known as missaires (called pitaines in the 19th and 20th centuries), who operate masked with a red hood (previously red or yellow depending on the promotion) and often armed with an axe, except for their leader, the GénéK, who is elected by the promotion and wears the kepi of a corps general. The GénéK appoints his missaires, tasked with perpetuating "disorder and traditions": teaching newcomers the values of the School, voicing student demands when traditional channels of request have failed, enlivening military ceremonies (including the presentation and handover of the flag), and organizing traditional evenings (such as the presentation of bicornes and the Code X, and the tangentes ceremony). Together with the Kès, the JTX, the Styx, and the BôBar, the Khômiss organizes the incorporation of students during the first week at Palaiseau.

== Code X ==
According to L'argot de l'X, published a hundred years after the creation of the School, the Code X is the "collection of regulations established by students which, in a playful form, aim to preserve the traditions and the old reputation of the School intact." It was created in 1852 but fell into disuse around 1968. Reactivated in 1999 by the Khômiss, although the code is moral, it is respected by most students.

== Argot de l'X ==
Over the years, a unique slang has developed at the School, of which here are a few examples:

Slang	Meaning	Origin	Reference
Casert	Student housing	From "casernement" (barracks)	
Cocons	Students of the same class at the École polytechnique	From "co-conscrit" (fellow conscript)	
Magnan	Student dining hall	A magnanerie is a place for raising silkworms, hence "cocoons" referring to the students of the École polytechnique (see definition of "cocon" above). However, it is more likely that Magnan initially derives its name from Jacques François Lemeignan, who was in charge of provisions at the School in the 19th century; the "cocoons" theory could then have encouraged the adoption of this name or explained its spelling. Another explanation attributes the origin to Fernand Magnan (X1876), "a lover of fine food" and likely a commissary.	
Tangente	Polytechnician's sword	It is worn "tangent" to the trouser stripes	

== See also ==
- École polytechnique
- Grand Uniform of the École Polytechnique

== Bibliography ==
- Fourcy, Ambroise (1987). Histoire de l'École polytechnique [History of the École polytechnique] (in French). Paris: Éditions Belin. ISBN 2-7011-0640-0.
- Pinet, Gaston (1887). Histoire de l'École polytechnique [History of the École polytechnique] (in French). Illustrated by Henry-Louis Dupray, Henri Thiriat. Paris: Baudry.
- Lévy, Albert; Pinet, Gaston (1894). L'Argot de l'X illustré par les X [The slang of the X illustrated by the Xs] (in French). Paris: Émile Testard.
- Tuffrau, Paul (1962). École polytechnique : livre d'or [École polytechnique: visitors' book] (in French). Raymond Lacour.
- Callot, Jean-Pierre (2004). Histoire et prospective de l'École polytechnique [History and future of the École polytechnique] (in French) (2nd ed.). Paris: Lavauzelle. ISBN 978-2-7025-0350-8. OCLC 464063564.
