= Château Dauzac =

French winery

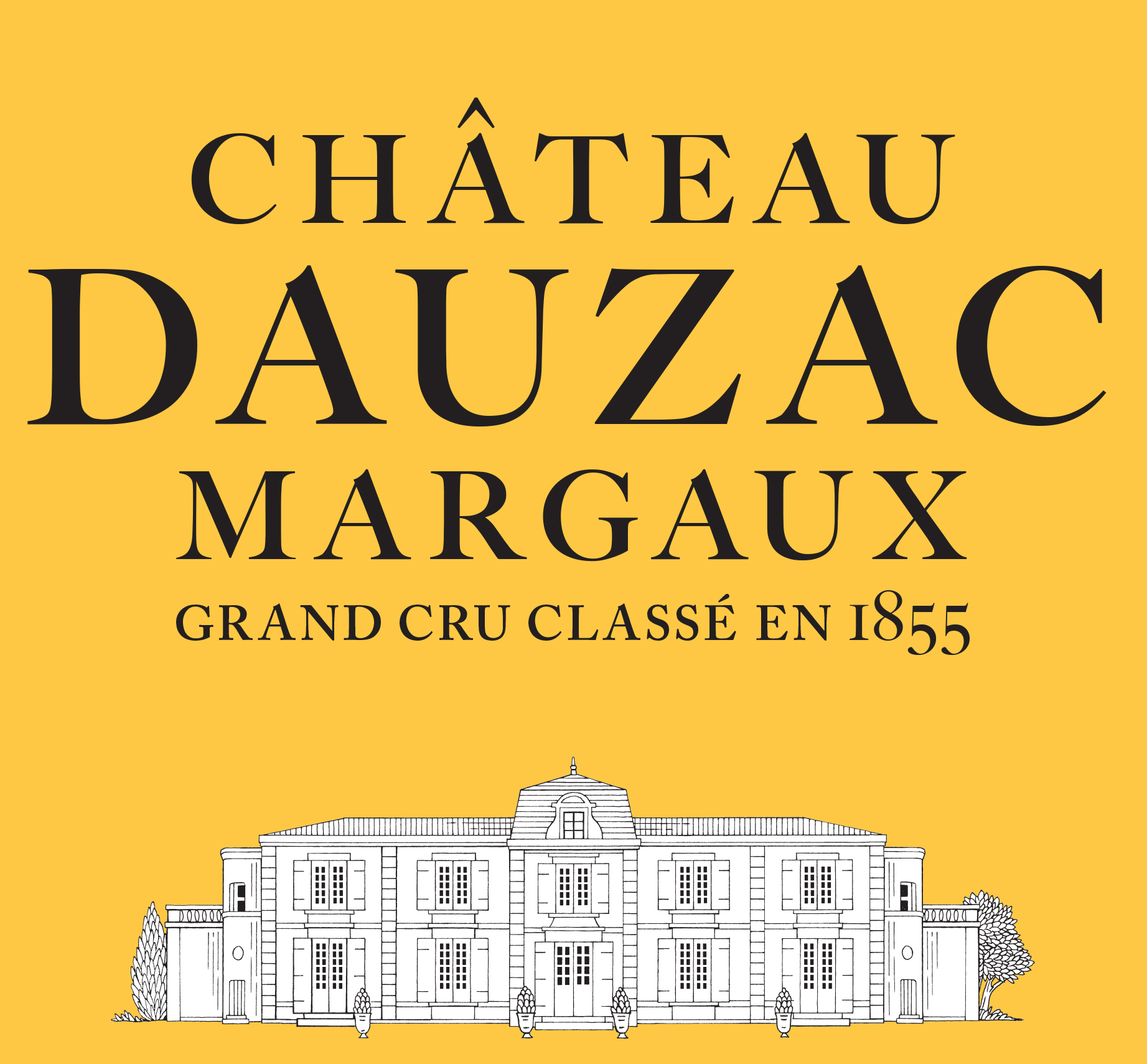
- Location: Labarde, Bordeaux, France
- Coordinates: 45.01936°N 0.62345°W
- Wine region: Médoc
- Appellation: Margaux, Haut-Médoc
- Other labels: Aurore de Dauzac, Labastide Dauzac, Le Haut-Médoc de Dauzac, D de Dauzac
- Key people: Christian Roulleau & his family (Groupe FOR-BZH), Laurent Fortin (CEO)
- Area cultivated: 111
- Cases/yr: 25.000
- Known for: Château Dauzac
- Varietals: 68% Cabernet Sauvignon, 32% Merlot
- Tasting: Open to public
- Website: www.chateaudauzac.com?lang=en

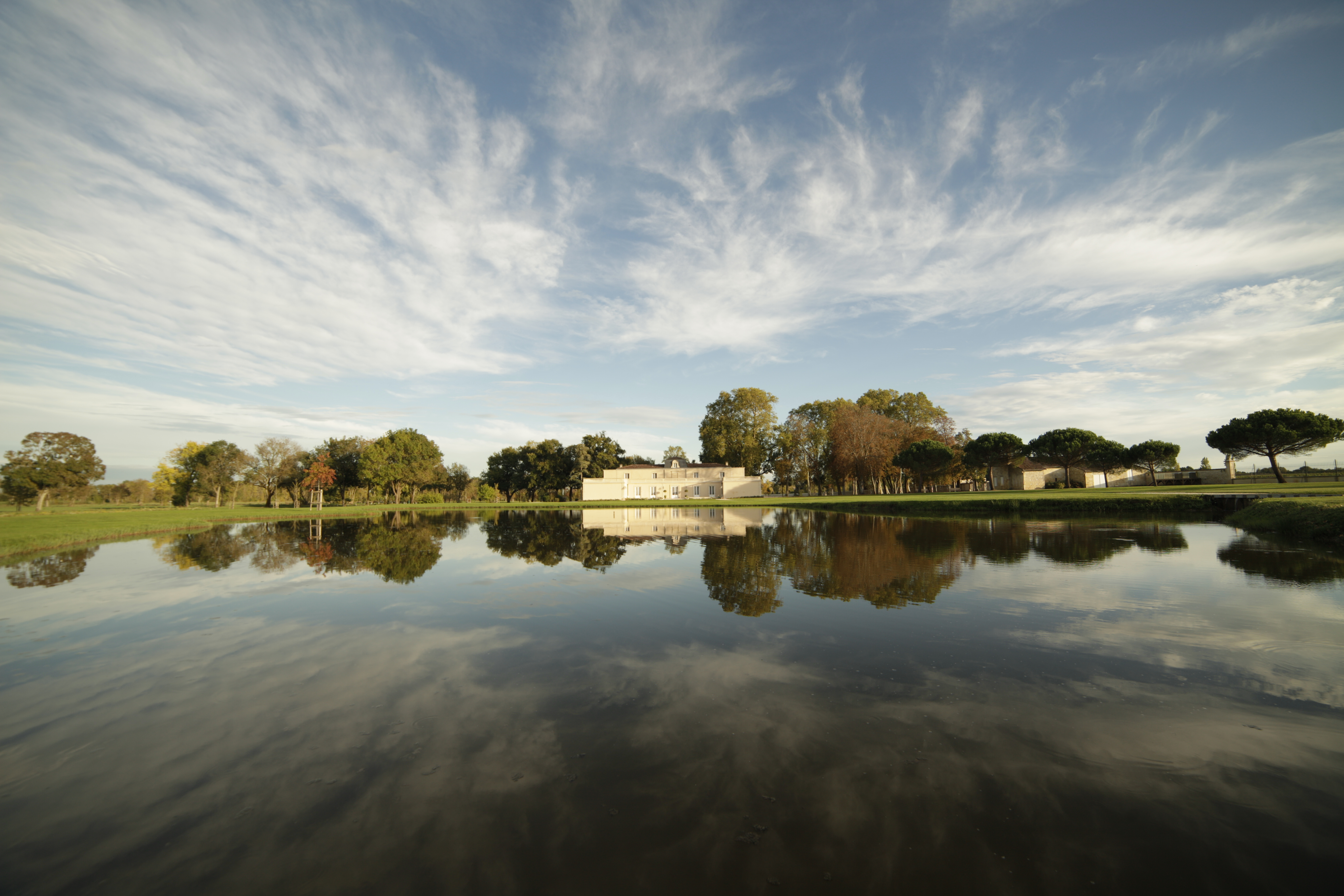
La Chartreuse de Dauzac

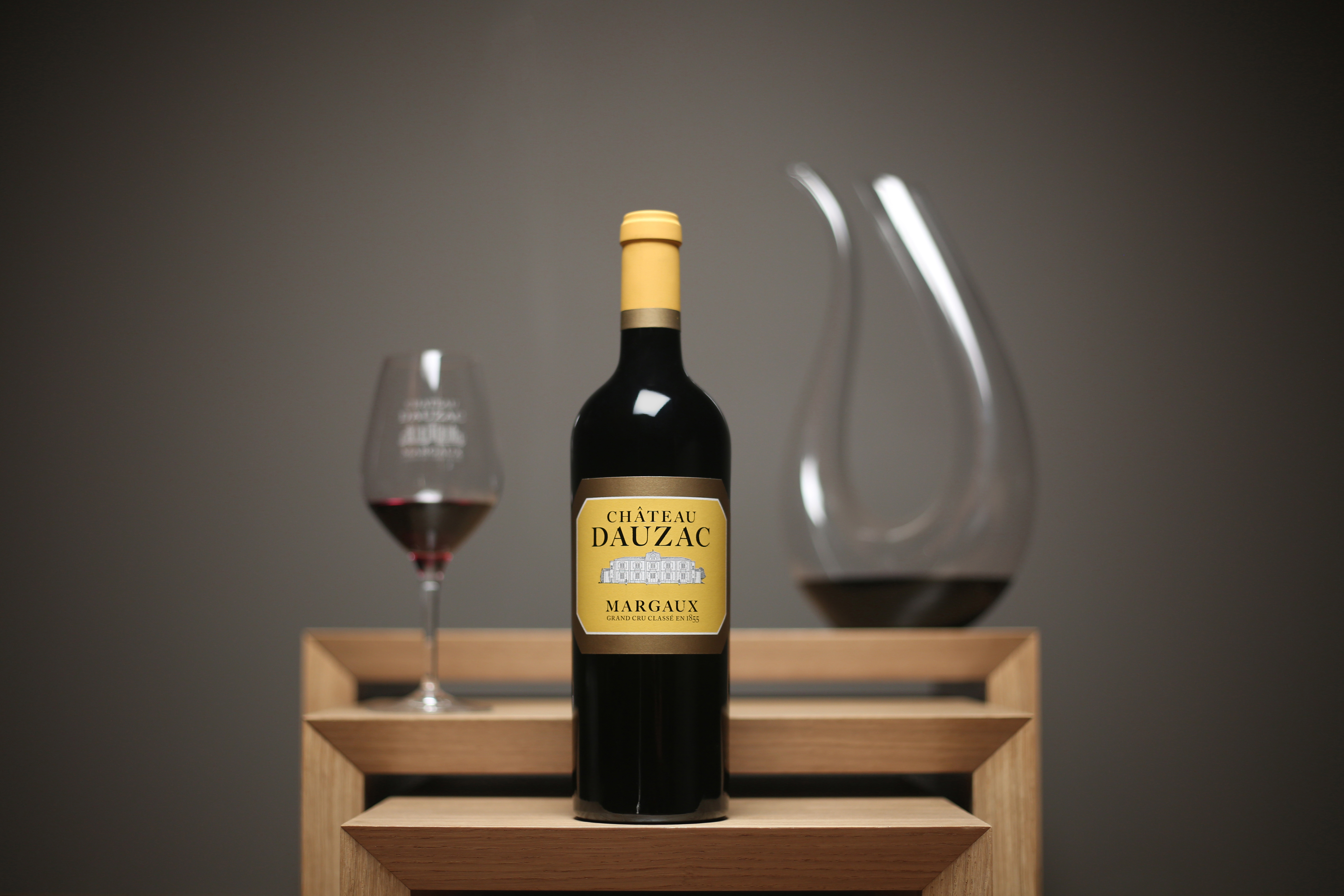
Chateau Dauzac

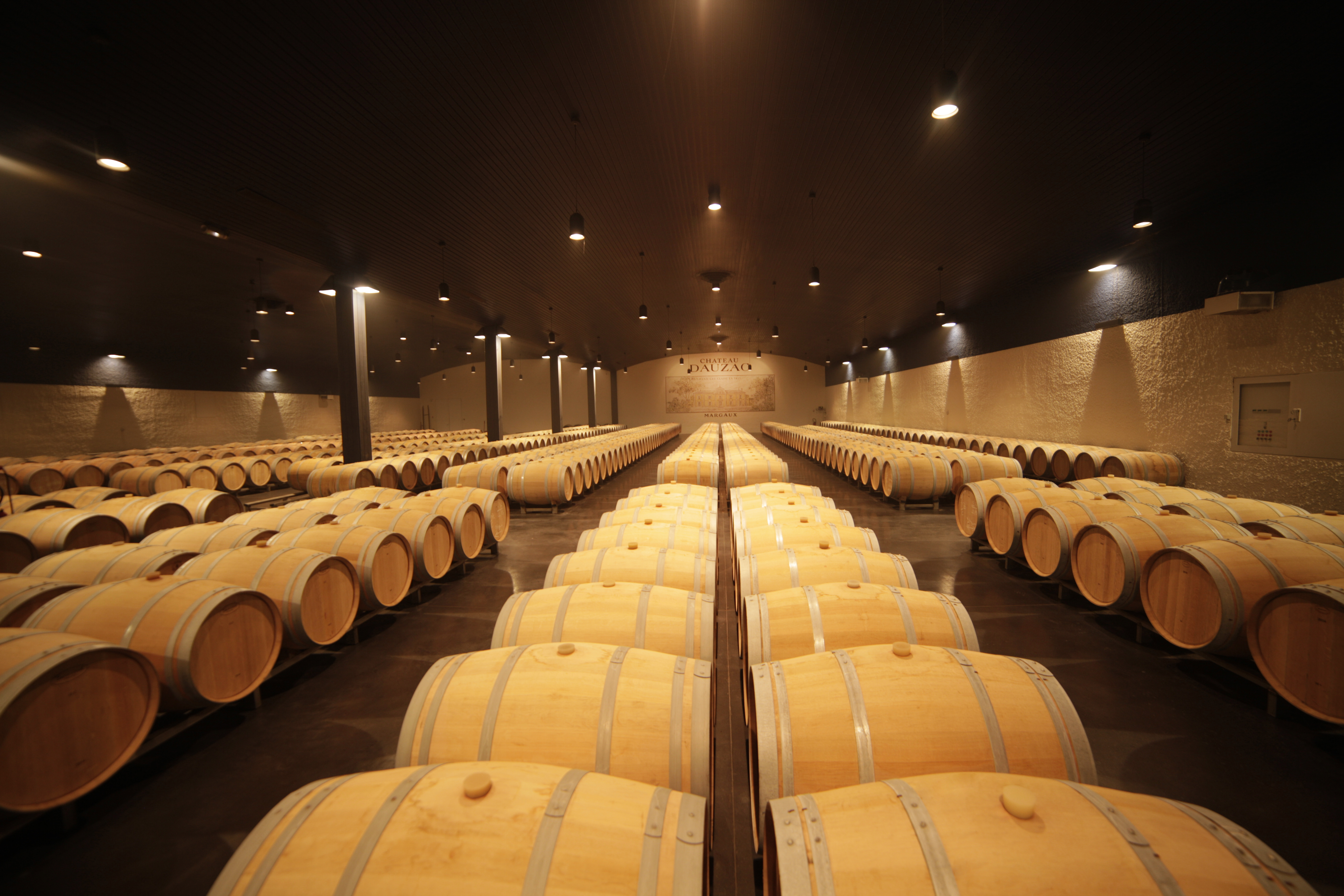
Dauzac's barrel room

Château Dauzac is a winery in the Margaux appellation of the Bordeaux region of France, in the commune of Labarde. The wine produced here was classified as one of eighteen Cinquièmes Crus (Fifth Growths) in the Bordeaux Wine Official Classification of 1855. It is now a family winery and owned by the Roulleau family.

== History ==
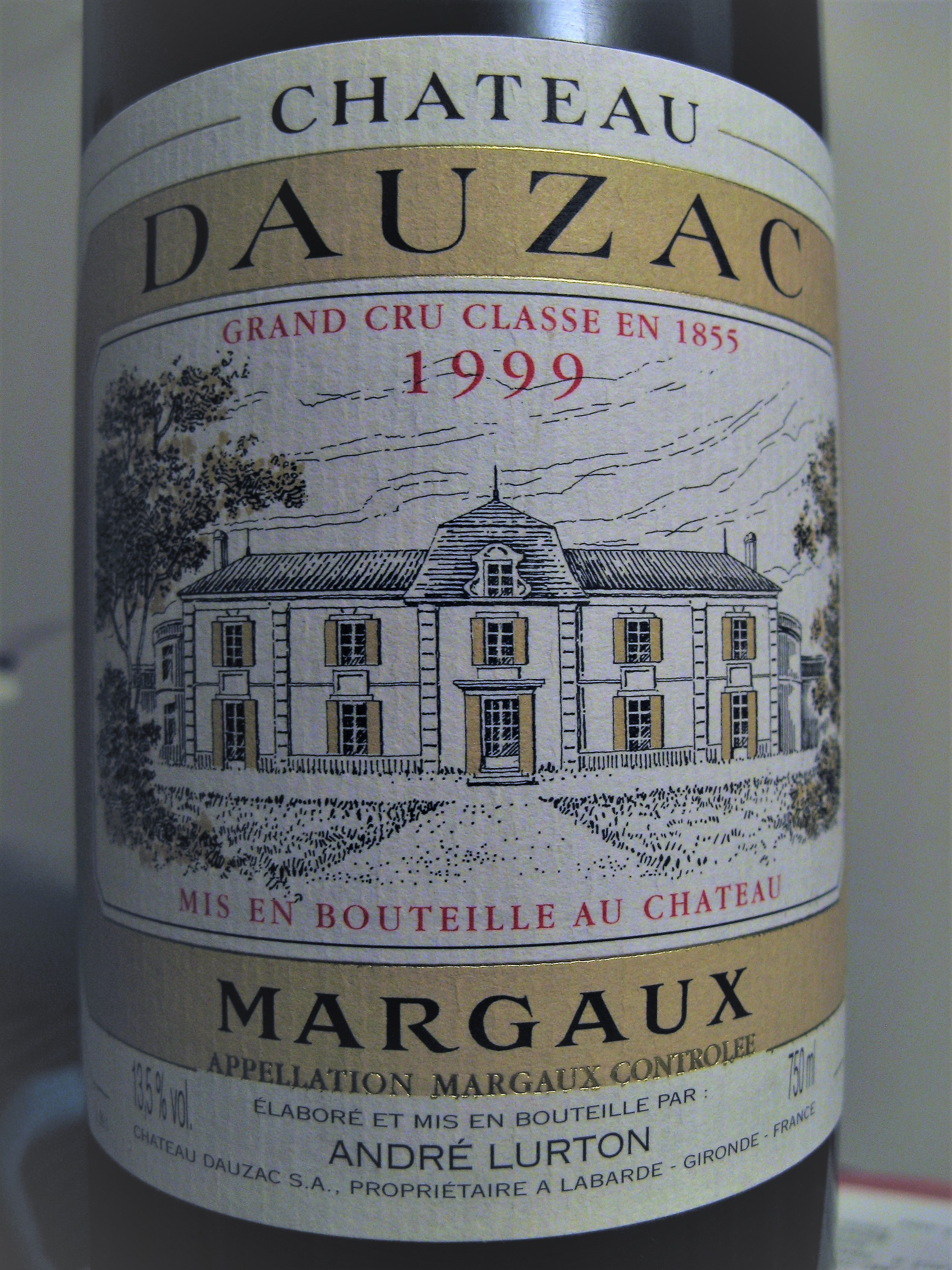
Label of Grand Vin 1999

- 1190: The oldest known owner the surrounding sector of Margaux was Pétrus d’Auzac, who received the land from Richard I, “Richard the Lionheart”, King of England, Count of Poitiers, Duke of Aquitaine, Count of Maine and Count of Anjou.
- 1545: The Benedictine monks of the Sainte-Croix de Bordeaux Abbey were the first to mention, in their records as early as 1545, the “Bourdieu” de Dauzac estate, “Bourdieu” then referring to a farmhouse with a vineyard.
- 1622: le « bourdieu de Dauzac » belonged to Jean Cousseau.
- 1671: Jean Cousseau let the estate to local Carmelite nuns.
- 1685: Pierre Drouillard bought Dauzac from the Carmelite nuns.
- 1708: When Pierre Drouillard died in 1708, his wife Elizabeth Noguès managed the estate until their daughter, Elisabeth Drouillard, married with the "Comte Lynch", who took over the estate in 1740. Lynch and Drouillard had 3 children : the elder Jean-Baptiste Lynch, mayor of Bordeaux (from 1809 to 1815 who passed at château Dauzac); the second son, Thomas-Michel Lynch, and daughter Peggy Elise Lynch. The Lynch family also owned the wineries that eventually became Lynch-Bages & Lynch-Moussas.
- 1841: Thomas Diedrich Wiebroock purchased Chateau Dauzac from the Lynch family. Under their management, Chateau Dauzac became Grand Cru Classé in 1855.
- 1863: From 1863 to 1939, the Johnston family owned Dauzac. In the 1880s, the tests which led to the development of the Bordeaux mixture to combat downy mildew took place mostly in the vineyards of Château Dauzac. They were conducted by professor Pierre-Marie-Alexis Millardet, assisted by Dauzac's technical director Ernest David.

Subsequent owners included Jean-Jacques Bernat (1939), the Miailhe family (1966), Felix Chatelier (1978), MAIF (1989). In 2020 the Roulleau family (Groupe FOR-BZH) acquired Chateau Dauzac.

== Size & grapes ==
The domaine comprises 297 acres (120 ha), of which 111 acres (45 ha) are planted, 68% with Cabernet Sauvignon grapes and 32% with Merlot. The average age of vines is around 30 years.

== Innovation ==
=== Thermoregulation ===
Mr Bernat, the owner of Glacières Bernat, acquired Château Dauzac in 1939. In order to regulate the temperature of vats, he came up with the idea of putting blocks of ice in them during fermentation, thus paving the way for thermoregulation.

=== Bouillie bordelaise ===
In the 19th century, several outbreaks of vine diseases occurred among the Vitis vinifera vines of the classical European wine regions. These outbreaks were caused by pests to which these vines lacked resistance, carried on vines brought to Europe as botanical specimens of American origin. These pests included not only the Great French Wine Blight caused by the aphid Phylloxera vastatrix, but also mildew and other diseases caused by fungi.

After the downy mildew had struck, botany professor Pierre-Marie-Alexis Millardet of the University of Bordeaux studied the disease in vineyards of the Bordeaux region. Millardet then noted that vines closest to the roads did not show mildew, while all other vines were affected. After inquiries, he found out those vines had been sprayed with a mixture of CuSO_{4} and lime to deter passersby from eating the grapes, since this treatment was both visible and bitter-tasting. This led Millardet to conduct trials with this treatment. The trials primarily took place in the vineyards of Château Dauzac, where he was assisted by Ernest David, Dauzac's technical director. Millardet published his findings in 1885, and recommended the mixture to combat downy mildew.

In France, the use of Bordeaux mixture has also been known as the Millardet-David treatment.

== Gallery ==
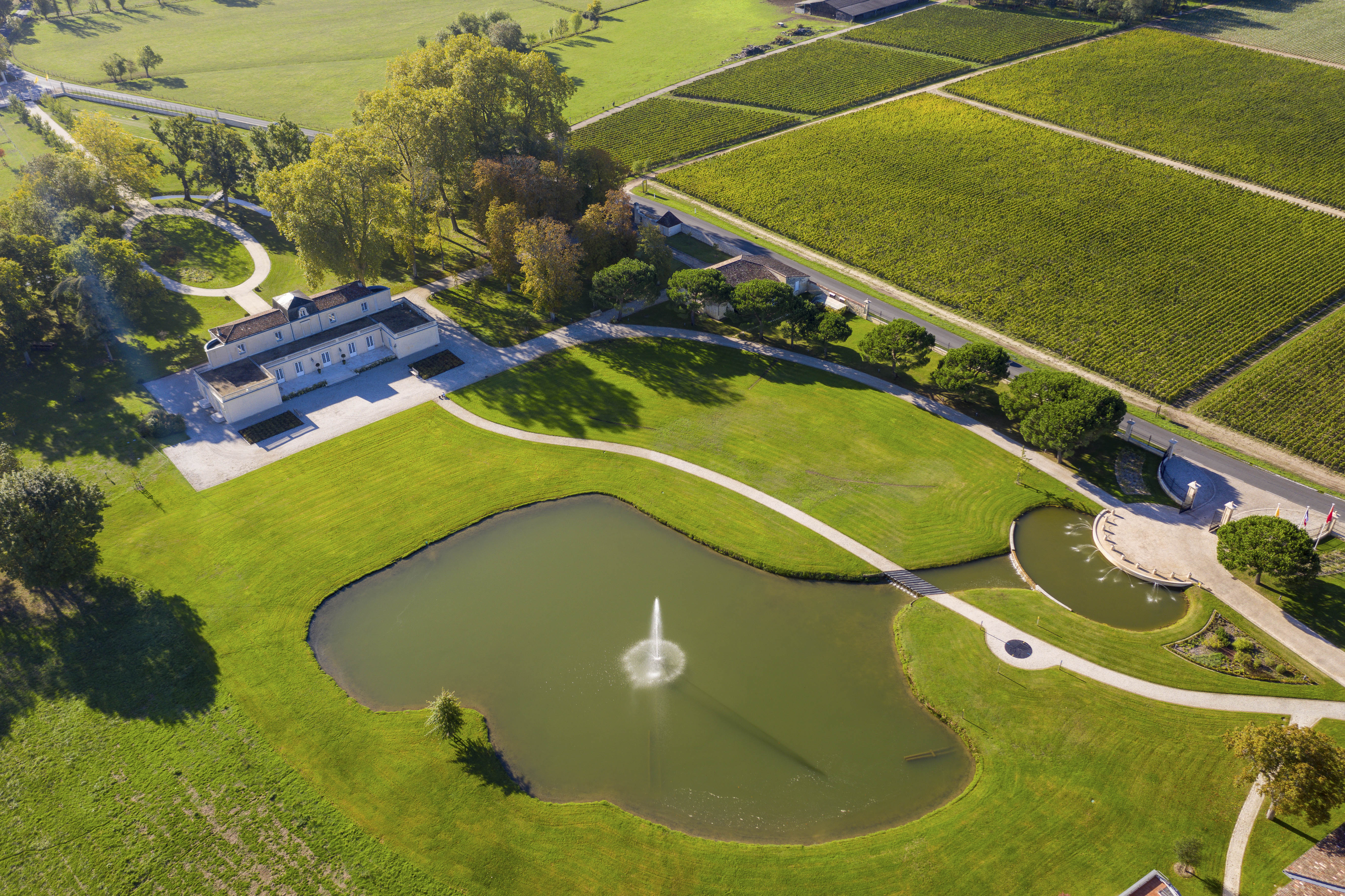

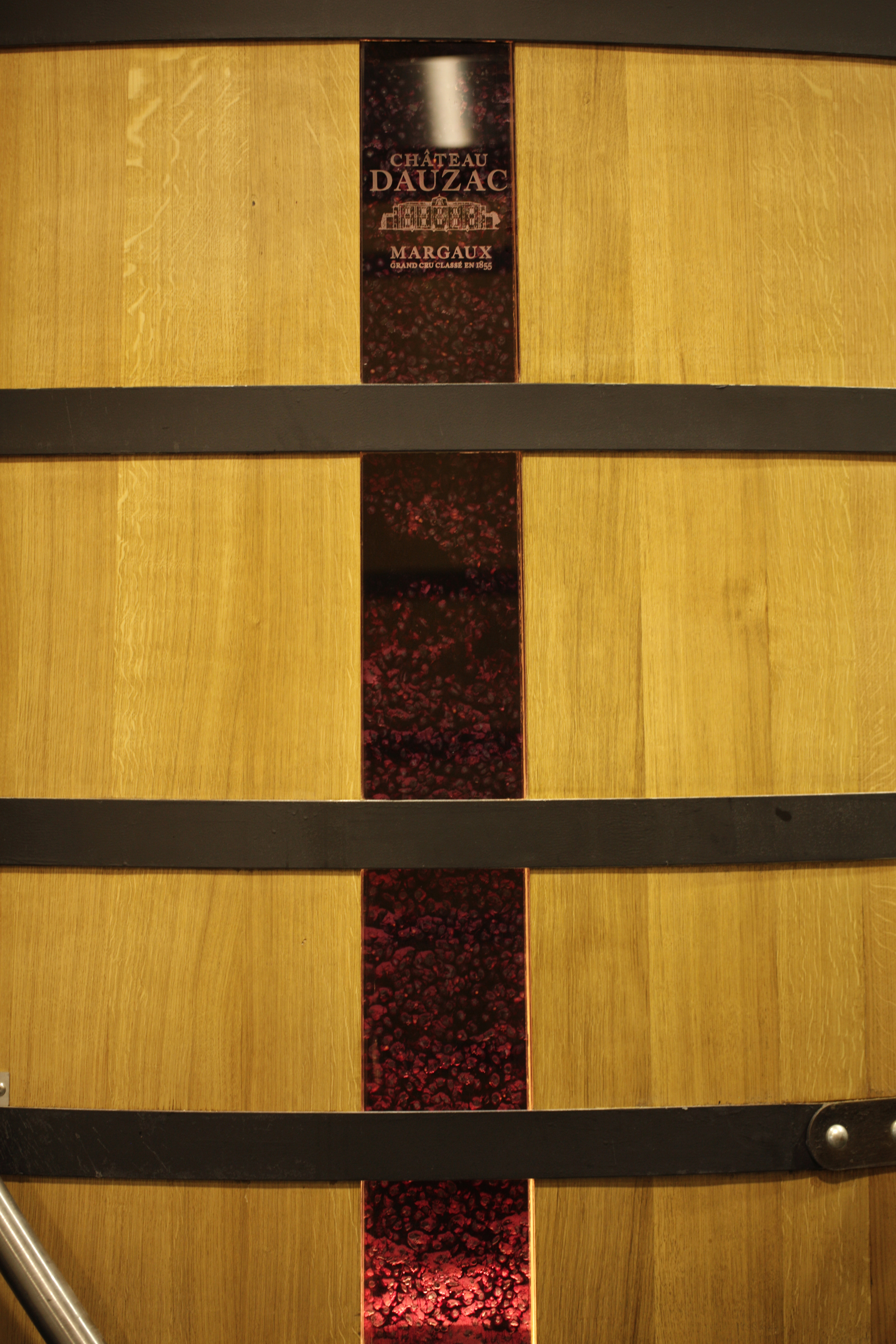

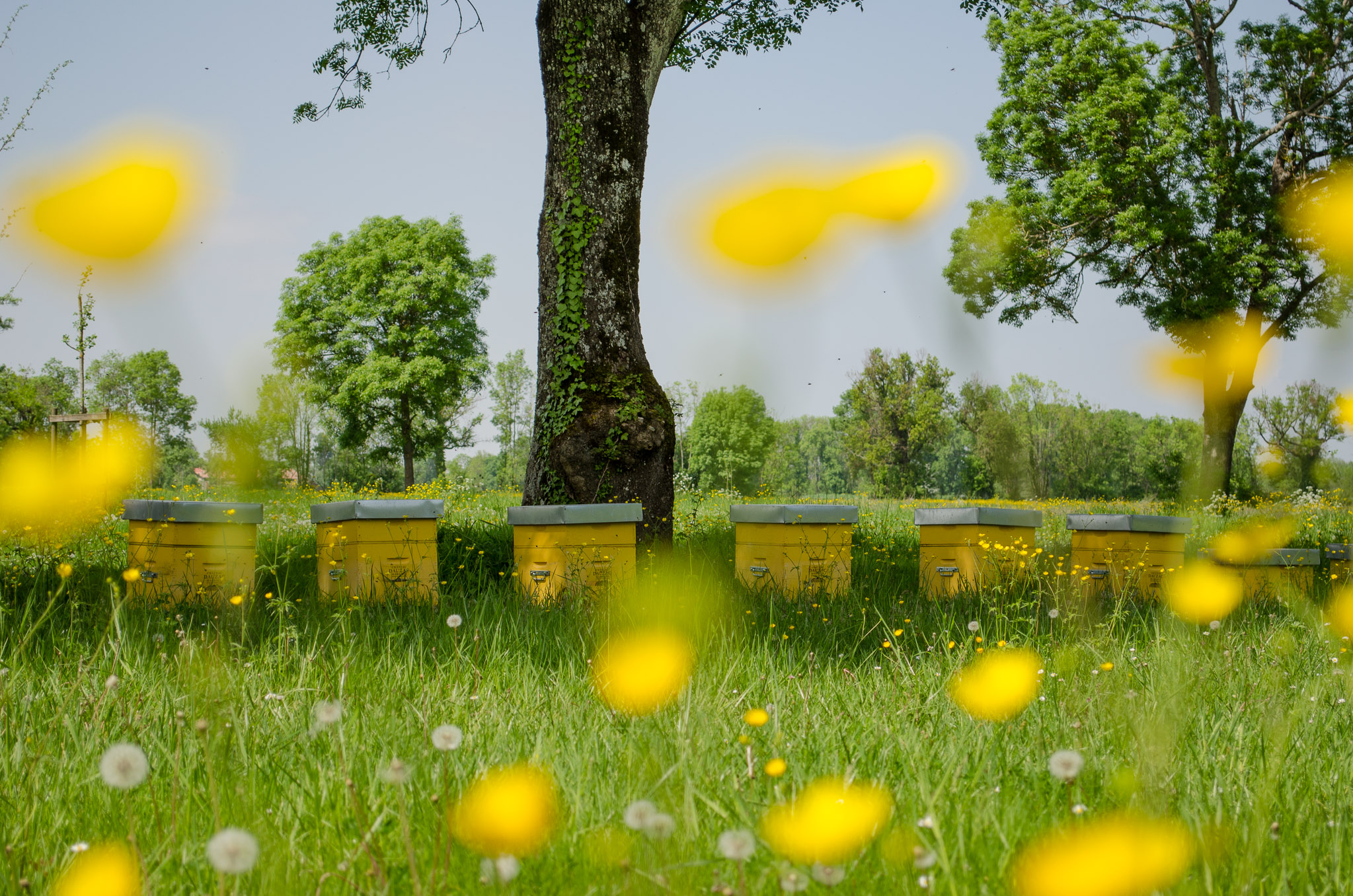

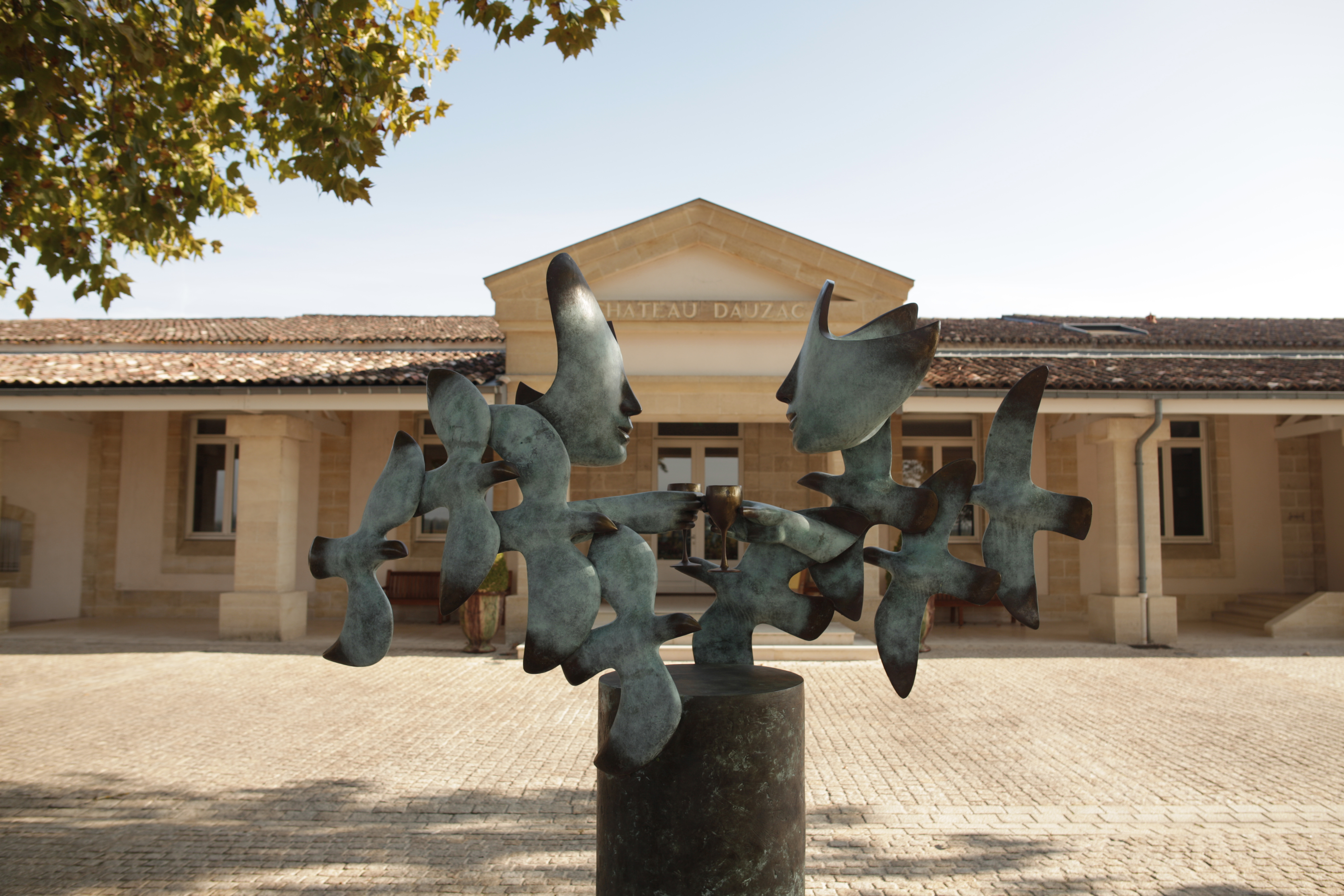

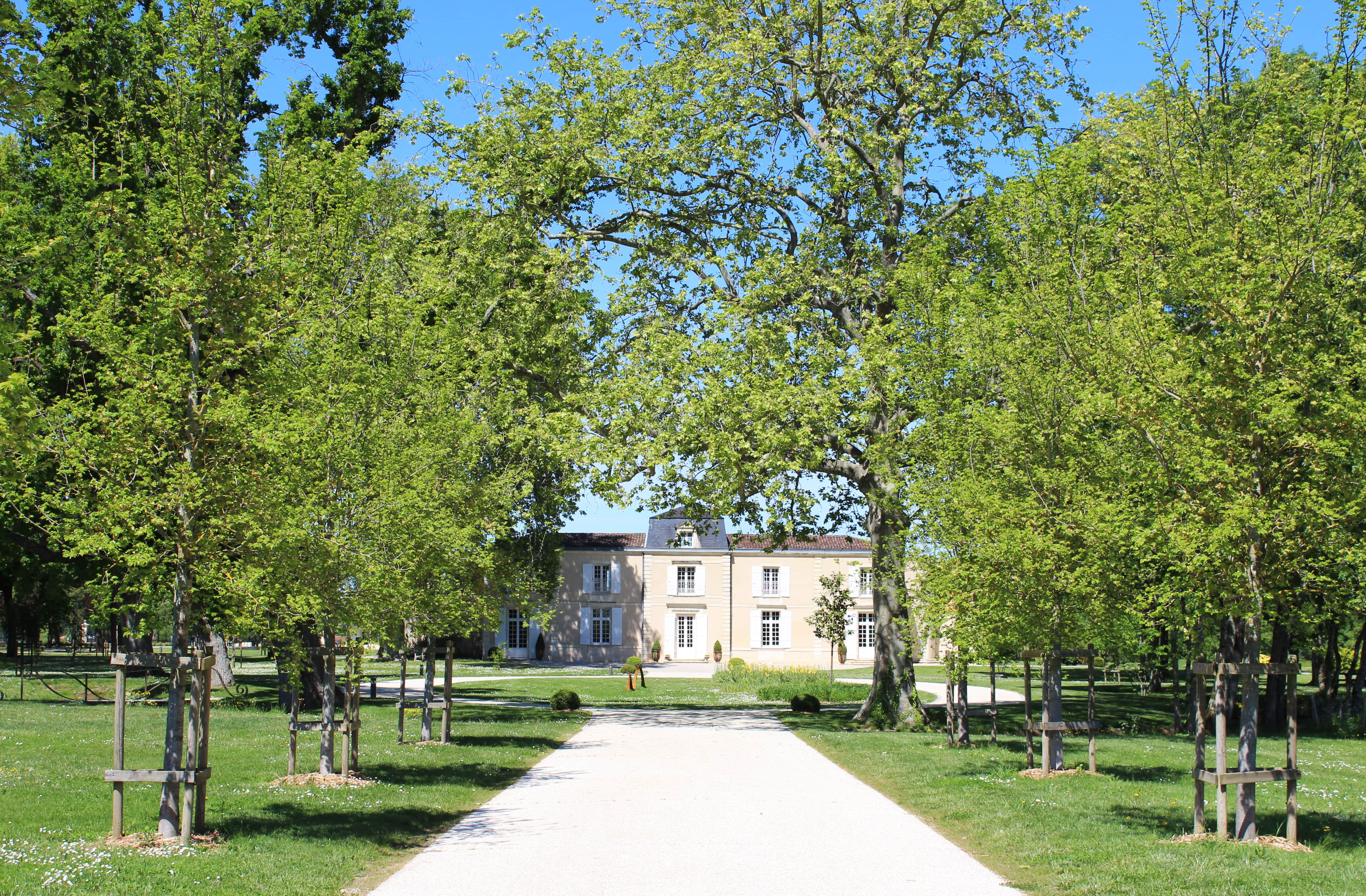
