= Flag of the Kingdom of France =

National symbols of France

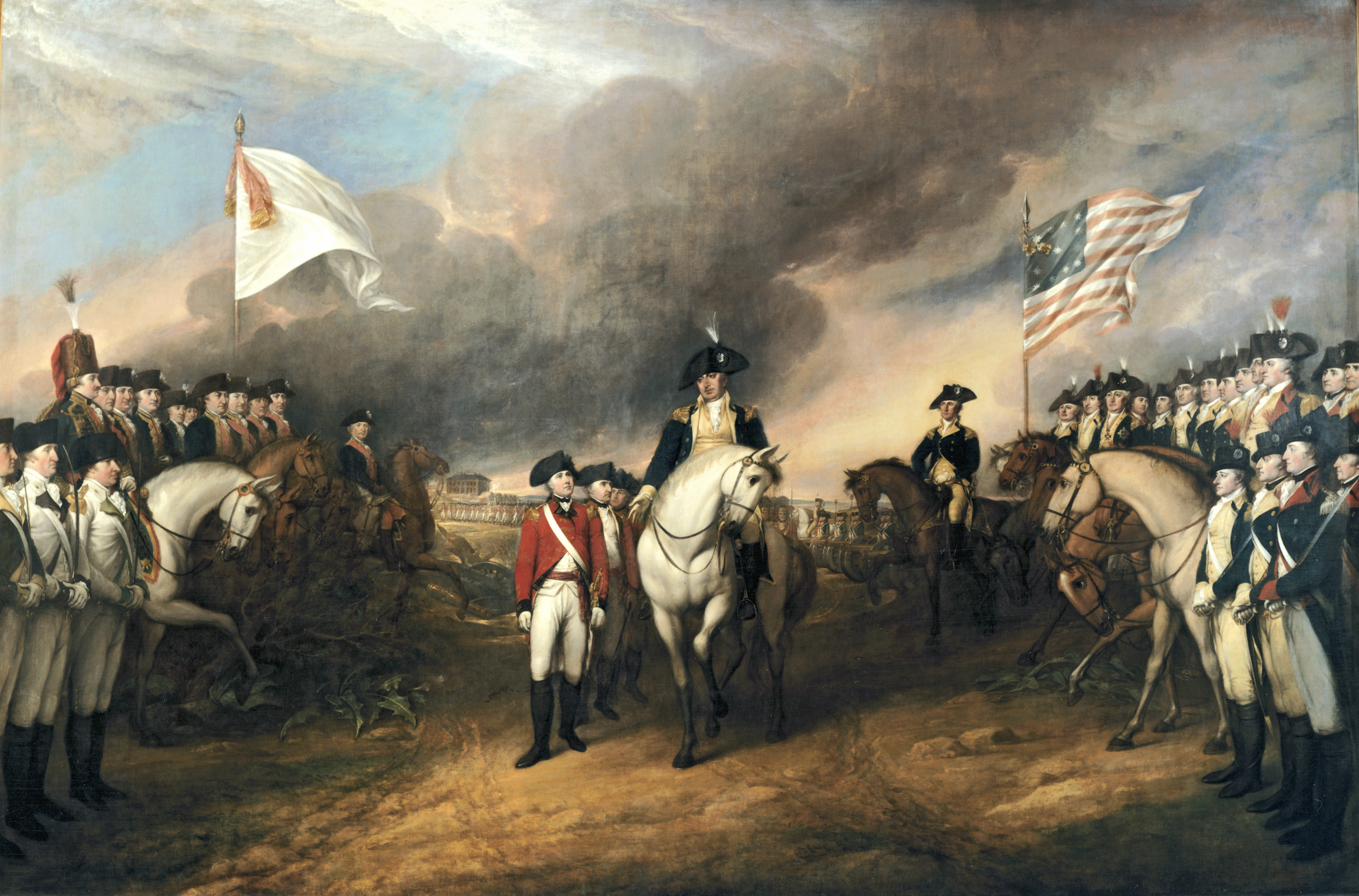
Cornwallis surrenders to Rochambeau between French troops flying a white flag and American troops, at the Siege of Yorktown in 1781.

The flag of the Kingdom of France was one of the symbols of France under the Monarchy. Before the French Revolution, there was no single flag that legally and practically served all the roles of the modern tricolour flag – especially that of representing the nation or state itself, rather than the king personally. Public buildings did not fly a national flag; instead, they displayed the coat of arms of the relevant authority (royal, ducal, comital, episcopal, etc.), depending on who controlled the building.

That said, banners were the portable version of coats of arms and used the same colors and designs. As a result, many different flags were used by the army and navy, either to represent the identity of individual regiments or ships or to show which authority was in command. The same colors and symbols also appeared in servants’ liveries and military uniforms.

However, white gradually became the pre-eminent royal and “French” colour, especially from the Hundred Years’ War onwards. By the later centuries of the monarchy, a plain white flag was widely seen – though never formally declared – as the personal emblem of the king and, by extension, of the French state itself.. The tricolour flag, adopted during the Revolution and the Empire, was abandoned under the Restoration and replaced by a white flag, usually bearing the royal arms. It was itself abolished in 1830, and the tricolour was permanently restored.

== Royal flags before the Revolution ==
Banners inspired by the French coat of arms

The earliest arms used from the 12th–13th centuries, showing a semé of fleurs-de-lis.

The later arms used from the 14th–16th centuries, limiting the fleurs-de-lis to three.

The term "flag" dates from the 16th century and, under the Ancien Régime, was reserved for the colours of French and foreign infantry in the king's service. Before the French Revolution, France was characterised by the existence of several flags and ensigns. The blue flag with golden fleurs-de-lis was traditionally the flag that represented France.

In 1328, the coat of arms of the House of Valois was a blue field strewn with golden fleurs-de-lis and bordered in red. From that point on, French kings were commonly shown in illustrations and manuscripts wearing a red robe under a blue cloak covered with golden fleurs-de-lis. Around 1376, Charles V simplified the design by reducing the countless fleurs-de-lis to just three. In heraldic terms, the older version (with fleurs-de-lis scattered across the whole field) is called France ancien, while the newer, three-fleur-de-lis version is known as France moderne.

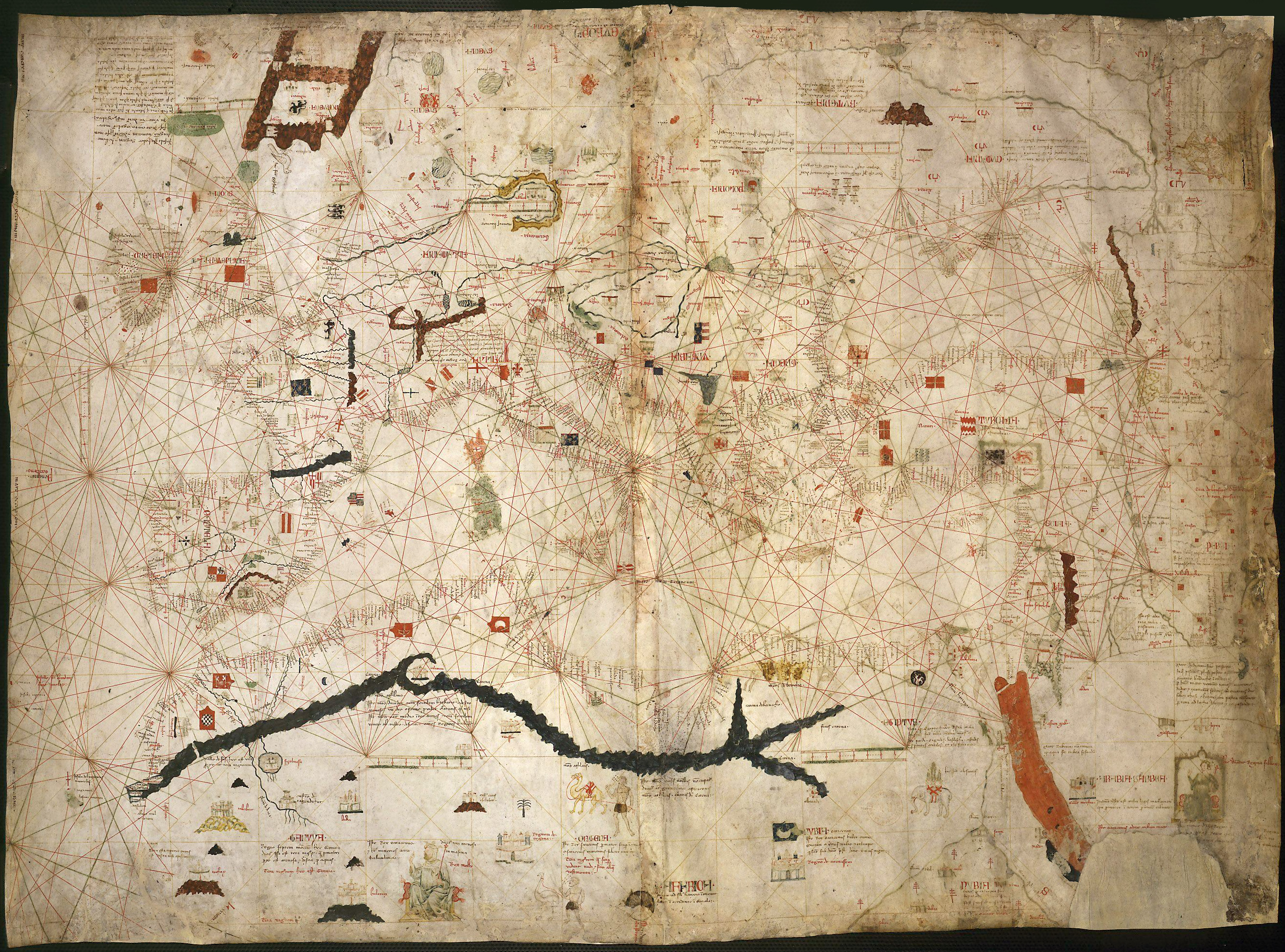
Portion of the 1339 portolan chart by Angelino Dulcert.

As early as 1339, the portolan chart made by the Majorcan Angelino Dulcert showed the Kingdom of France represented by a nearly square blue banner covered with golden fleurs-de-lis. The same symbol appeared on the Catalan Atlas commissioned by Charles V.

Banners displaying the royal arms of France were carried by the king’s armies and flown on his warships and merchant ships alike. Another important royal standard was the oriflamme of Saint-Denis a revered symbol of French kingship. Over time, however, the colour white began to play a larger role in royal and national symbolism, and this shift also affected the flags that were used.

=== Emergence of white at the end of the Middle Ages ===
In the 14th century two paintings show white standards atop the mast of a royal ship and a castle sheltering the royal family.

At the Battle of Mons-en-Pévèle on 18 August 1304, the French, at the request of Philip IV, adopted the white scarf.

The white cross first appeared as a French symbol during the early years of the Hundred Years’ War (1337–1453). It is not known whether the king himself or someone in the royal administration chose it. The earliest clear record of its use comes from 1355, when Count Jean d'Armagnac ordered everyone in his town and lands to wear a white cross when they went to fight against Prince of Wales, son of Edward III. The symbol might be even older. A later story about the famous French commander Bertrand du Guesclin says that he once killed an English knight, took the man’s equipment, and replaced the red cross of St George with a white one. If the story is true, the French historian Georges Minois believes it happened in 1347 or 1348.

During the reign of King Charles VI, the royal stables produced three large standards—one blue, one white, one red. The white standard showed a large golden sun in the centre, surrounded by many smaller golden suns. It was carried together with 1,500 white pennons, each decorated on both sides with a golden sun, for the king’s men-at-arms. The official inventory of the royal stables also lists white pennons scattered with shields of France, as well as white velvet banners embroidered with the French coat of arms and decorated with parrots.

The white cross, which by this time clearly stood for the French side in contrast to the red cross of the English and the red saltire of the Burgundians, was praised in a poem written for the coronation of Charles VII at Reims in 1429: “Long live the noble, white and proud cross of the beautiful garden of the noble fleurs-de-lis”. Joan of Arc's famous white standard, which was dedicated to Jesus Christ and did not carry the royal arms of France, further helped make the colour white a sacred and national symbol in the Kingdom of France.

By the end of the Hundred Years’ War, the colour white had taken on a strong patriotic meaning for the French. Historian Philippe Contamine notes that on 25 June 1429, people in Talmont-sur-Gironde, saw a rider carrying a large white scarf. The sight terrified the local Bretons, who were fighting on the English side under Henry VI of England, because they took it as a sign of French victory. Likewise, Jean de Dunois, later recalled that on the morning of 20 August 1451, just before the English garrison of Bayonne surrendered to Charles VII’s army, a white cross was seen in the sky above the city.

=== White during the Renaissance ===
During the Italian Wars, white was once again identified with the king and the Kingdom of France. Charles VIII descended into Italy with white silk standards bearing the shield of France. Upon entering Rome, he ordered the Jews to wear a white cross in order to protect them. When Charles VIII and Louis XII entered Italian cities, the people welcomed them by shouting "France" and wearing white clothes. In France, as in Italy, the reading of the royal entries indicates that the king's equipment was marked with the color white.

A royal cornette was worn during the Battle of Fornovo on 6 July 1495, by Charles du Mesnil-Simon, valet tranchant to Louis XI and Charles VIII. However, we know from Philippe de Commynes that this cornette was white. We also know that the cutler carried the pennant of France, made of purple velvet strewn with golden fleurs-de-lis, which suggests that the white cornette had replaced it before 1495. Father Anselme claims that the white cornette appeared during the Battle of Pavia in 1525.

This identification of white with France is evident, for example, in a text addressed to Henry II by an author in the early second half of the 16th century. Placed beneath the equestrian statue believed to be that of Philip VI in Notre-Dame de Paris (Note: It was actually a statue of Philip IV the Fair.) (actually of Philip IV the Fair), it extolled the immaculate whiteness of the Gallic banners. (Note: Isidore of Seville, in his Etymologies IX, 2, 104, asserted that the Gauls derived their name from the whiteness of their complexion. The Jesuit priest Georges Fournier also referred to the whiteness of the Gauls in 1643.)

During the French Wars of Religion, Protestants wore the white scarf as a symbol of the purity of their faith, while Catholics wore the red scarf of the Spanish. Henry III resumed the white scarf to thank the troops of the then-Protestant Henry of Navarre for saving him on 8 May 1589.

Subsequently, Henry IV imposed white through multiple decisions: an ordinance of July 18, 1590, required the king's loyalists to wear a white sash, and another of June 1, 1594, prohibited anyone from going to the king's camp without a white cross sewn on their clothing or a white scarf. Earlier, during the Battle of Ivry on 14 March 1590, did not the same Henry IV, on horseback, shout to his troops the famous rallying cry: “Rally to my white plume!”? And isn't this referred to when we “bring out” the famous playful riddle: “What color was Henry IV's white horse?”?

=== French infantry flags ===
The term "drapeau" appeared in France in the 16th century, in 1578, for the colours of foot soldiers. It came from Italy.

The companies of foot soldiers created by Charles VII and Louis XI were first called "bandes", then regiments in 1569. They were issued flags, most bearing the white cross. However, great diversity of colours characterised them, and after the Battle of Fleurus (1690) on 1 July 1690—when French artillery fired on French regiments—all flags, standards, and guidons were given a white cravat attached to the top of the staff beneath the spearhead.

A peculiarity of French infantry was that each regiment carried two flags: the drapeau colonel (white with a white cross) and the drapeau d'ordonnance (variable colours with a white cross) (Note: The colonel’s flag was that of the colonel’s guard of the regiment.).The white cross remained on infantry flags until 1794, and the white scarves or cravats became tricolour from 1790.

Under Louis XIII, the white cockade appeared, though it coexisted with the black cockade of certain units.

=== French naval ensigns ===
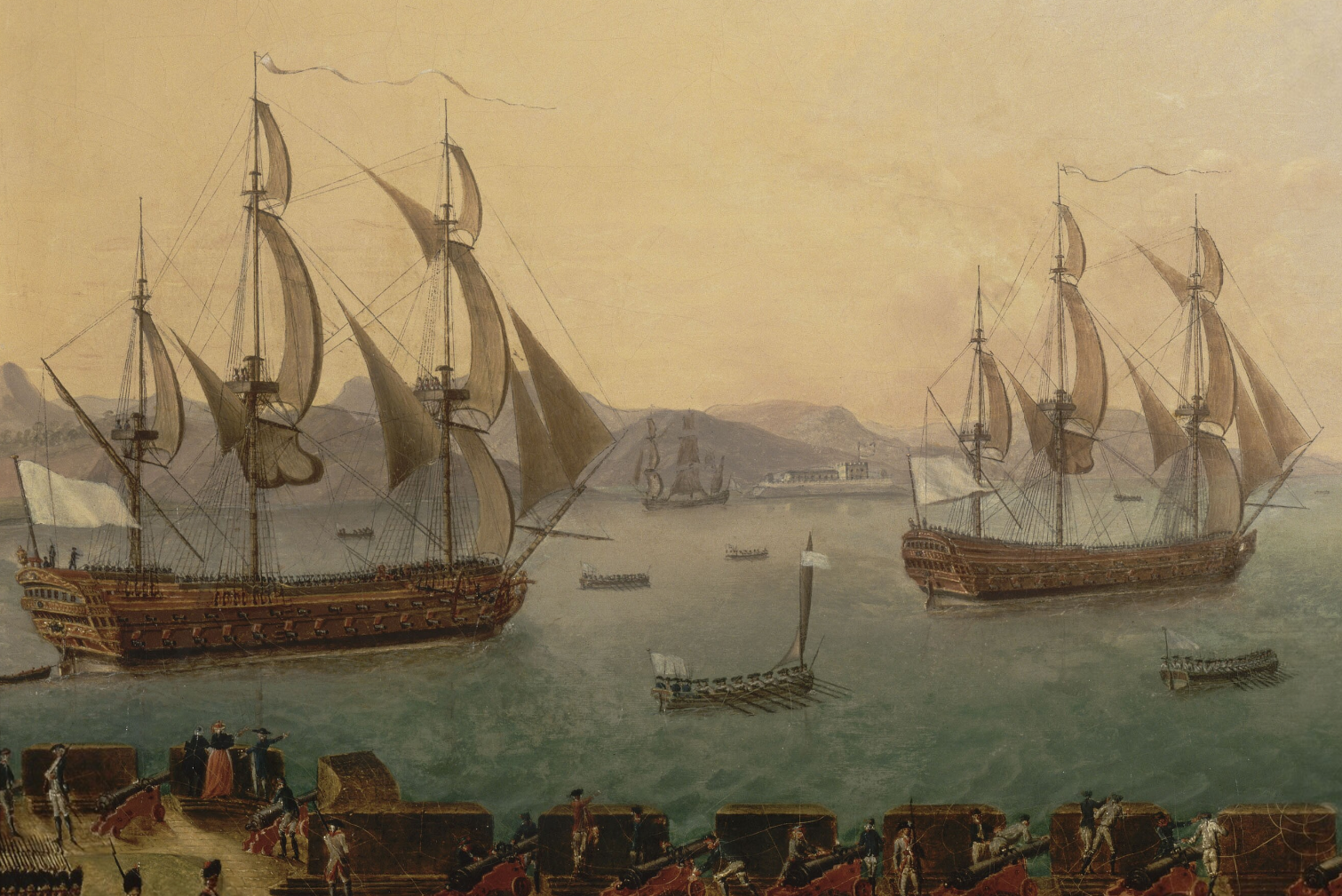
French warship flying the royal white ensign in 1779.

French naval ensign in the 16th century.

Merchant ensign in the 18th century.

While blue flags with golden fleurs-de-lis were used until the end of the Ancien Régime, French ships carried red flags with white crosses from the 15th century onwards. In the 16th century blue ensigns with a white cross became general for the merchant navy. This blue flag with a white cross can be seen at the top of the mast of a ship in a painting from the Ursuline monastery in Quebec City in 1650. Francis I and Henry III legislated to impose this blue flag with a white cross.

After Louis XIII abolished the title of Admiral of France France in January 1627, French warships replaced the former white cornette (a long pennant) with a plain white flag, which then became the standard ensign of the royal navy. Later, in an ordinance dated 9 October 1661, Louis XIV ordered that warships should fly a white flag bearing the royal coat of arms of France, while merchant vessels were required to use a blue flag with a white cross.

Then, by a decision of March 25, 1765, the white flag was generalized to the merchant navy, making white the sole representative of the French nation at sea. King Charles III of Spain abandoned the white ensign with Spanish arms and by decree of 28 May 1785 ordered the red-and-yellow ensign that became the modern Spanish flag.

The white ensign was celebrated by Jean de La Varende: "The extraordinary ensign, the immaculate ensign, the foremost ensign in the world and the most august, the one that needed no decoration, no heraldic device: the white ensign!"

=== Use of the white flag on land ===
While the French army had its own flags, there was no official flag flown over public buildings to indicate the king’s presence or the seat of royal authority—though white standards were sometimes displayed during celebrations.

However, the white flag was sometimes used for festive purposes in the 17th and 18th centuries. For example, the Palais de la Félicité, built for the Parisian carousel in April 1612, was decorated with seven long white banners with two tails, as shown in an anonymous painting in the Musée Carnavalet. During the Parisian celebrations for the marriage of Madame Élisabeth, daughter of Louis XV, to the Infante Philip, there was a spectacle on the Seine, where a column was topped with a white flag.

Toward the end of the Ancien Régime, the only places on land where the white ensign was regularly seen were ports, where it marked the entry point into French territory. On 3 March 1781 Louis XVI issued an ordinance that formally extended the use of the white ensign on land to signify royal jurisdiction on foreign soil (Note: In an ordinance of November 19, 1776, Louis XVI had declared that “the white color has at all times been the distinctive mark of the French navy.”). Merchants soon adopted the practice as well, hoisting plain white flags over their warehouses.

== The white flag under the Restoration ==
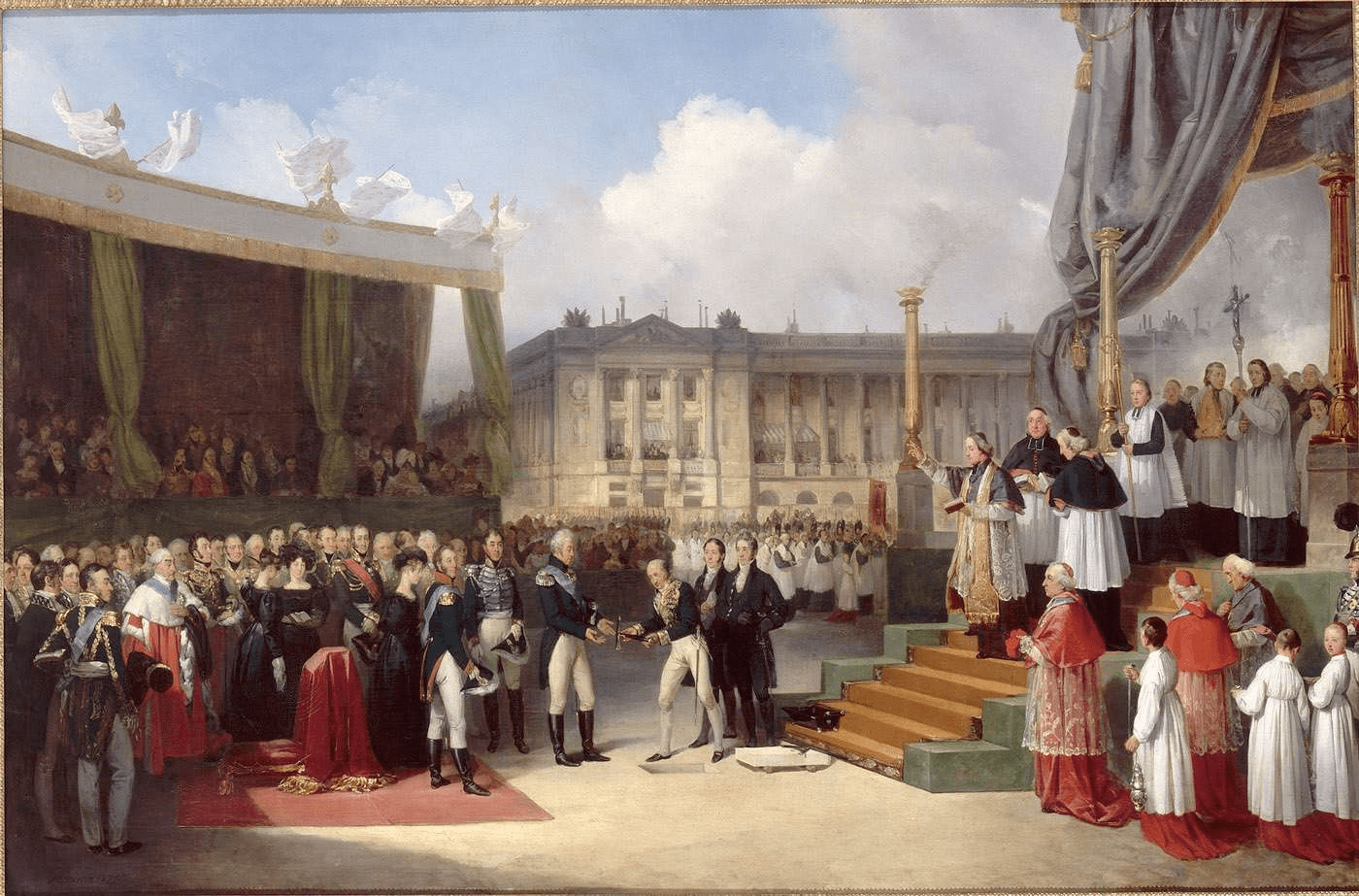
Inauguration of the monument to the memory of Louis XVI by Charles X, Place de la Concorde, 3 May 1826 (Joseph Beaume, 1827). Above the canopy on the left, white flags are visible.

By the ordinance of 12 May 1814, the white ensign was restored during the First Restoration (1814–1815) and then for fifteen years during the Second Restoration (1815–1830), and it was given functions it had not possessed under the Ancien Régime.

=== Restoration of the white flag ===
During the 1814 Campaign of France, white cockades were worn in several places as a spontaneous show of support for the Bourbon monarchy, even before the Allied powers had officially decided France’s future. For example, when Austrian troops entered Dijon, locals displayed white cockades in defiance of Allied instructions.

On 12 February 1814, when the Duc d'Angoulême arrived in Bordeaux, Mayor Jean-Baptiste Lynch greeted the prince wearing the white scarf and hoisting the white flag. Then, on 31 March 1814, as Allied troops entered Paris, tens of thousands of French people put on white cockades to welcome them and signal their loyalty to the returning royal family.

On 13 April 1814 the provisional government decreed that the white cockade was the French cockade, to be worn throughout the army, and that the white ensign would be flown by warships and merchant vessels., (Note: Marshal Davout, who refused to abandon Hamburg after the announcement of Napoleon I’s abdication, continued to defend the city, but only after having hoisted a white flag bearing the arms of France. He did not cease his resistance until 30 May 1814, on the orders of Louis XVIII.).

After the Hundred Days, Marshal Masséna urged Louis XVIII to allow the use of the tricolour cockade in order to secure a warmer popular welcome. The king declined, yet he was greeted with even greater enthusiasm than in 1814.

On 9 November 1815, a law on the suppression of seditious shouts and incitement to rebellion made it a criminal offence (among other acts) to remove or damage the white flag.

=== The army ===
From May 1814 the king issued new flags to the army: a white field charged with the shield of France (the crowned escutcheon) formed the basis of the new symbolism. On 7 September 1814 the flags of the Paris National Guard were distributed at the Champ de Mars.

Several royal ordinances specified army flags under the Restoration.

- The ordinance on the organisation of French infantry of 12 May 1814 stated in article 8 that there would be one flag per regiment, white, bearing the shield of France and the regiment's designation.
- The ordinance on cavalry organisation stated in article 13 that there would be one standard per regiment of carabiniers, lancers, chasseurs, and hussars; the field white, bearing the shield of France and the regiment's designation.
- The ordinance of 3 August 1815 creating the départemental legions declared in article 40 that each legion would have a white flag charged with the shield of France and the legion's designation.
- The ordinances on artillery and engineers of 31 August and 6 September 1815 specified in articles 35 and 34 that flags would be white, semé of fleurs-de-lis, with the shield of France.

=== The navy ===
On December 3, 1817, a regulation specified the flags of the merchant navy: in accordance with an ordinance of 1765, shipowners could add a mark of recognition to the French flag, which was entirely white with no ornamentation. The French flag had to be flown at the stern, and, in the absence of a flagpole, at the mizzenmast.

In 1819 the first official French album appeared under the title Pavillons des puissances maritimes. For France it showed:

- The French ensign, flown by all warships and merchant vessels and the model for the land flag.
- The royal standard, semé of 43 golden fleurs-de-lis and charged with the medium coat of arms of France (shield, crown (Note: The crown is half-filled with a red Phrygian cap; the pearls on its arches are in the three colors blue, white, and red; and the stones of the band are red and blue.), collars, and two natural-coloured angels with grey wings wearing sky-blue scarves).

The ordinance on service aboard of the royal navy, signed 31 October 1827 at the Tuileries Palace, specified that the ship commanded by the Admiral of France flies the white square flag with the arms of France crossed in saltire from the mainmast.

On 11 June 1828 the king specified ensigns to be flown aboard vessels visited by royal family members:

- A white ensign semé of golden fleurs-de-lis throughout, charged in the centre with the arms of the Dauphin of France, to be flown aboard vessels visited by the king's eldest son (Note: The same flag is flown in the event of a visit by the Dauphine.) (two anchors saltire-wise behind the shield, the dauphin being Admiral of France).
- A white ensign semé of golden fleurs-de-lis throughout but without a shield, for all other royal family members.

=== The white flag in public life ===
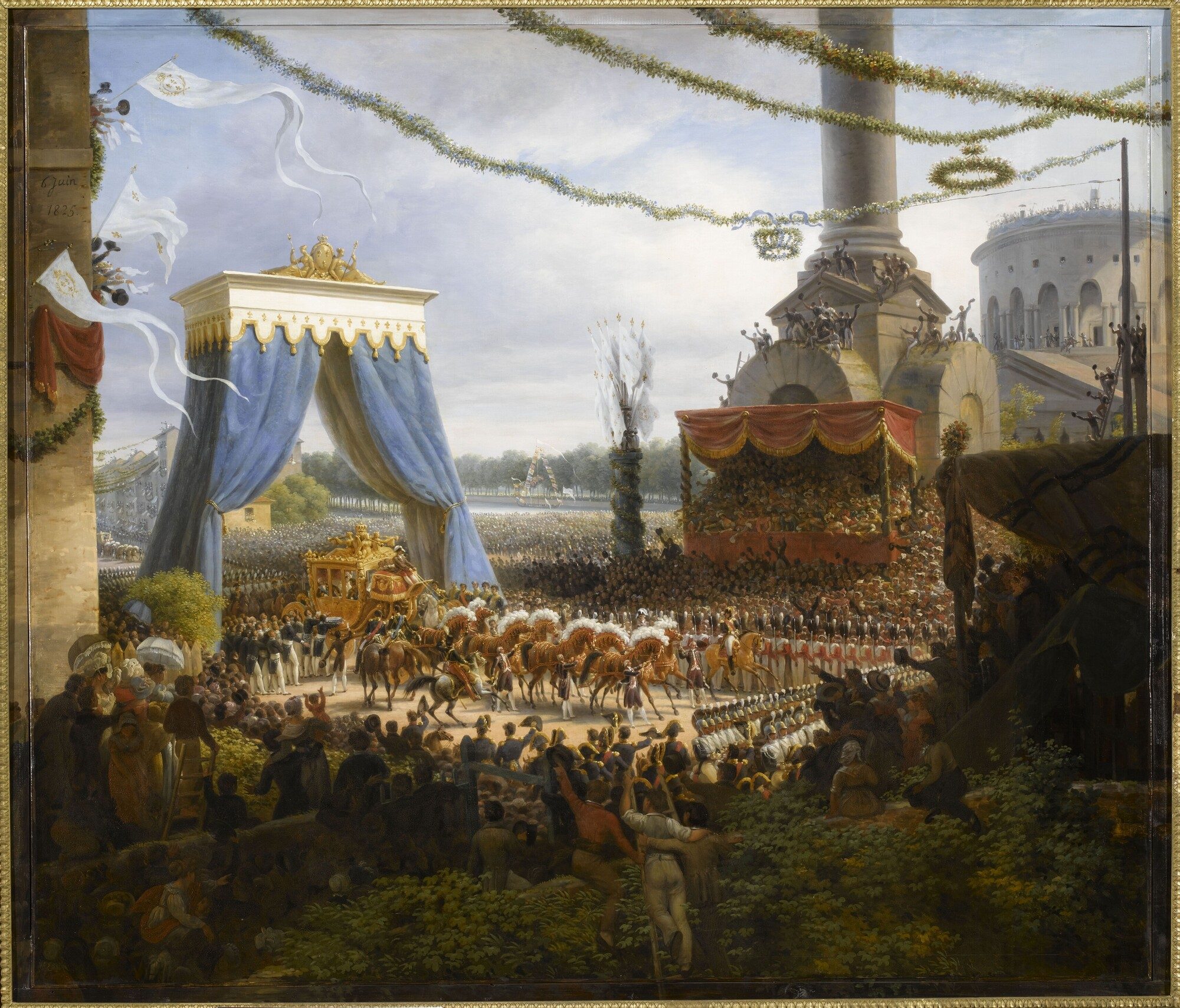
Entry of Charles X into Paris through the Barrière de la Villette after his coronation, 6 June 1825 (Louis-François Lejeune, 1825). On the left the painting shows two types of white flags with fleurs-de-lis.

At the start of the Restoration, with no official land flag defined, public buildings flew the plain white naval ensign. Many found it too plain, so white flags decorated with fleurs-de-lis or the full royal arms soon became common. For example:

- The tents at the meeting place of the royal family and the Duchesse de Berry near the Croix de Saint-Hérem crossroads in the Forest of Fontainebleau on 15 June 1816 were topped by white flags semé of golden fleurs-de-lis.
- At the baptism of the Duc de Bordeaux (future Comte de Chambord) on 1 May 1821 the two towers of Notre-Dame de Paris were topped by two double-pointed oriflammes decorated withfleurs-de-lis and bearing the arms of France. This was a direct copy of the oriflammes used at the coronation of Napoleon I.
- The shield of France wreathed in foliage often appears on flags: the royal tent near Reims after the coronation of Charles X (31 May 1825) was topped by two long swallow-tailed standards bearing this composition.
- The Moniteur universel of 31 August 1829 reported that at Caen on 28 August Christian schoolchildren each waved a white flag semé of fleurs-de-lis.

=== Other flags and heraldic symbols ===
The Restoration also used the banner and pennon of France, both square, of violet velvet semé of golden fleurs-de-lis, for certain ceremonies such as the funeral of Louis XVIII.

== The white flag since 1830 ==
=== End of the white flag in 1830 ===
The absence of the white flag on the flagpole of the Tuileries clock tower, which signaled the king's absence, contributed to the discouragement of the soldiers fighting the riot. The last white flag flying over Paris was that of the royal Hôtel des Invalides, whose governor, Lieutenant-General Marquis de Latour-Maubourg, refused to surrender and only did so after the king's departure for Rambouillet on 31 July 1830. The four companies of bodyguards who accompanied the king handed over their four standards to him on August 15 before his departure into exile (Note: These four standards were deposited at Frohsdorf and have since disappeared.). The government of Louis Philippe I, titled King of the French, restored the tricolour (Note: The white flag flew over the French embassy in Madrid, with the ambassador, the Viscount of Saint-Priest, remaining in post until October 1830.)

A fictional flag devised at the end of the 19th century as a compromise between the tricolour accepted by the population and the white flag supported by the Comte de Chambord.

=== The legitimist flag since 1830 ===
Since 1830 legitimists have remained attached to the white flag, which to them symbolises the tradition of the Most Christian Kings, Eldest Sons of the Church.

- It served as the emblem of the royalist insurgents who followed the Duchesse de Berry.
- In 1871, during the first restoration attempt, the Comte de Chambord published a manifesto in the newspaper L'Union refusing to abandon the white flag that had "floated over his cradle". In the second attempt in 1873, faced with the distortion of his words by Charles Savary, he published another letter in the same legitimist newspaper reaffirming his attachment to the white flag, causing the restoration attempt to fail.
- This attachment is found among supporters of the senior Bourbon line. Thus the Duc de Madrid reminded his French supporters, who regarded him as "King Charles XI of France", of his attachment to the white flag.

== Gallery ==
Royal banner with the arms of France under Charles VI (r. 1380–1422).

Royal banner with the arms of France under Francis I (r. 1515–1547).

Royal banner with the arms of France under Louis XIII (r. 1610–1643).

Royal banner with the arms of France under Louis XIV (r. 1643–1715).

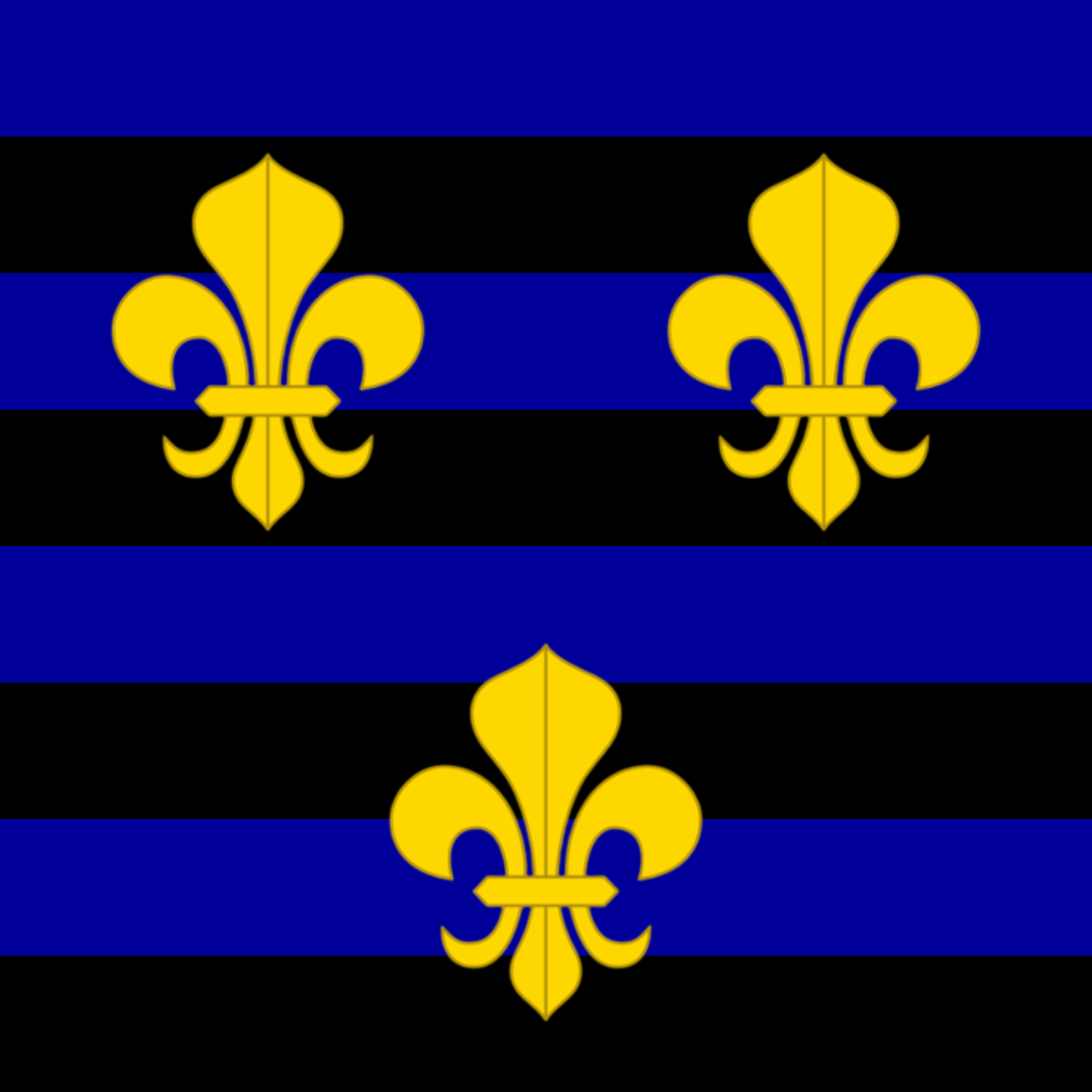
Royal banner with black-bleu stripes (14th century)

White flag used under the Ancien Régime as a naval ensign and then as the official flag under the Restoration.

Ensign of ships carrying the king under the Ancien Régime from Louis XIV (1638–1790).

Royal standard of Louis XIV, flown in the king's presence.

National naval ensign 1790–1794. From 1794 to 1815 the blue and red were reversed to create the tricolour.

Flag bearing the Bourbon arms used 1814–1830 during the Restoration.

Flag used 1814–1830 in the king's presence and as the ensign of ships receiving royal family members.

Type of white flag used under the Restoration as seen in Lejeune's painting.

Another type of white flag used under the Restoration as seen in Lejeune's painting.

Another type of white flag used under the Restoration as seen in Lejeune's painting.

Representative flag of French royalists used at the end of the 18th and beginning of the 19th century.

Tricolour flag of the kingdom under the July Monarchy.

== See also ==
- Flag of Quebec
- Flag of France
- Fleur-de-lis
- White flag

== Bibliography ==
- Turrel, Denise (2005). Le Blanc de France. La construction des signes identitaires pendant les guerres de Religion, 1562-1629 (in French). Droz.
- Pinoteau, Hervé (1998). Le Chaos français et ses signes. Étude sur la symbolique de l'État français depuis la Révolution de 1789 (in French). PSR. p. 516.
- Pinoteau, Hervé (2004). La Symbolique royale française Ve-XVIIIe (in French). PSR. p. 916.
- Richard, Bernard (2012). Les Emblèmes de la République (in French). CNRS Éditions. pp. 169–195. ISBN 978-2-271-07299-3.
