= Château Trotte Vieille =

Bordeaux wine producer

Coordinates: 44.89478°N 0.14508°W

Château Trotte Vieille, alternately Château Trottevieille, is a Bordeaux wine producer from the appellation Saint-Émilion, ranked Premier grand cru classé B in the Classification of Saint-Émilion wine. The estate is located in the Right Bank of France’s Bordeaux wine region in the commune of Saint-Émilion, in the department Gironde.

The estate also produces the second wine Dame de Trotte Vieille (since 2002).

== History ==
Situated below Château Troplong Mondot, the name of the estate is suggested to derive from la trotte vieille (English: old trotting lady), invoking a story of an elderly woman who once regularly trotted by nearby roads. More likely is however the relation to the Swiss word for wine press "Trotte".

In 1949, Trottevieille was acquired by Marcel Borie, head of the firm Borie-Manoux, who left the estate to his son-in-law Emile Castéja.

To date the estate is owned by Borie-Manoux, also owners of Château Batailley and Château Lynch-Moussas, making it the only Saint-Émilion grand cru owned by a Bordeaux négociant. It is currently managed by Philippe Castéja, with oenologists Gilles Pauquet and Denis Dubourdieu as consultants.

== Production ==
The vineyard area extends 10 hectares (25 acres) with a grape variety distribution of 50% Merlot, 45% Cabernet Franc and 5% Cabernet Sauvignon. Of the Grand vin, Château Trotte Vieille, and the second wine, La Vieille Dame de Trotte Vieille, there is a total annual production of 3,000 cases.
