= Borie-Manoux =

Bordeaux wine maker and merchant group

Borie-Manoux is a Bordeaux wine négociant house, and winery and wine merchant group, initially founded as Negociant Borie by Pierre Borie in Pauillac in 1870. The firm was situated in Pauillac until the late 1940s when it was moved to Bordeaux.

Borie-Manoux is completely owned by the Castéja family, with Philippe Castéja as current CEO.

Among the Borie-Manoux holdings through Héritiers Castéja are Pauillac chateaux Batailley and Lynch-Moussas and Saint-Émilion estate Château Trotte Vieille, in all ten Bordeaux chateaux as well as several other Bordeaux négociants, Loire négociant and producer holdings and a number of brand wines such as the lucrative label "Beau Rivage". Borie-Manoux has also have close ties to London wine merchant Berry Bros. & Rudd, for whom they produce the label "Good Ordinary Claret".
