= Château Batailley =

Winery in the Bordeaux region of France

Coordinates: 45.17680°N 0.77289°W

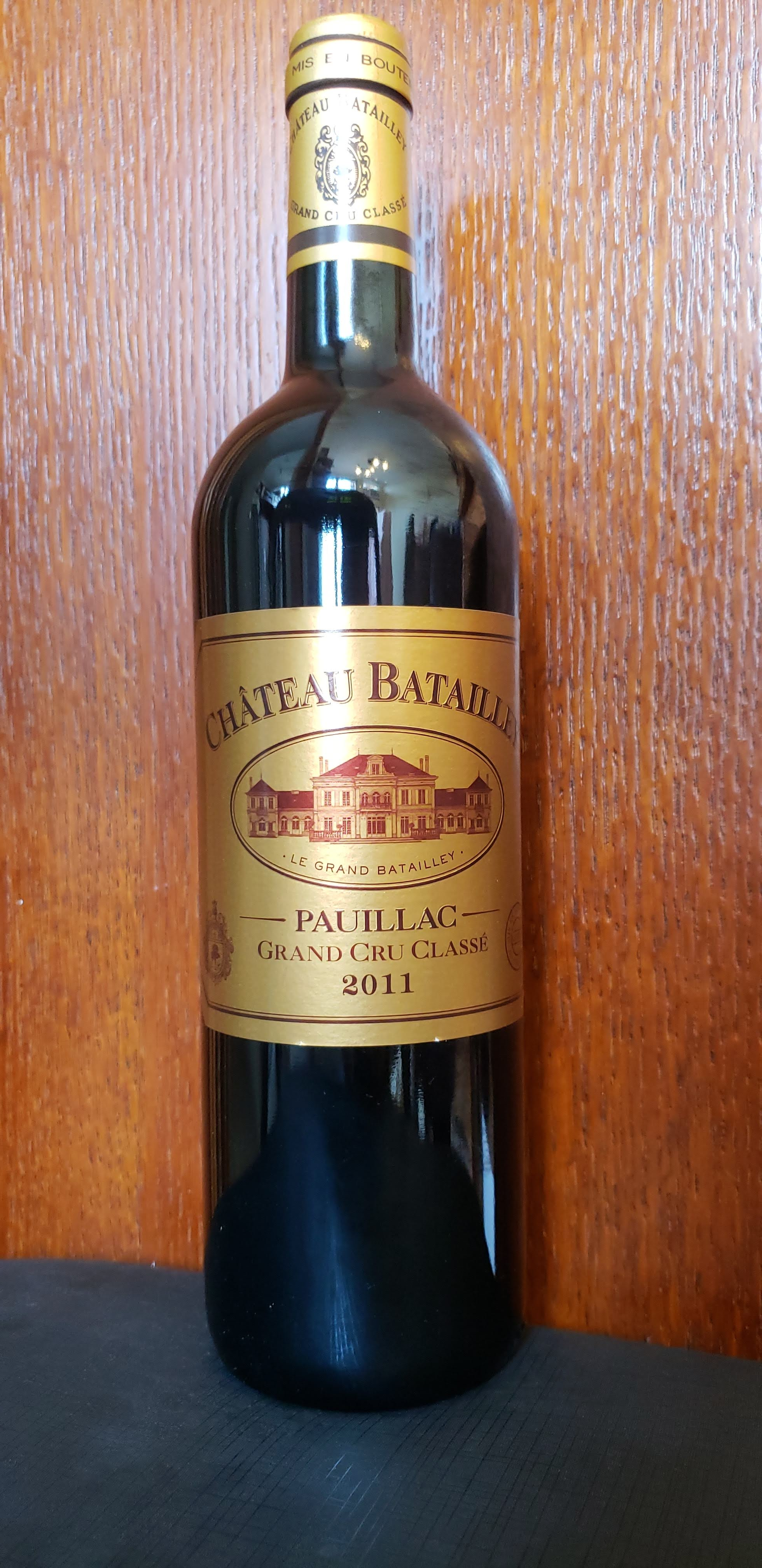
Grand Vin of 2011

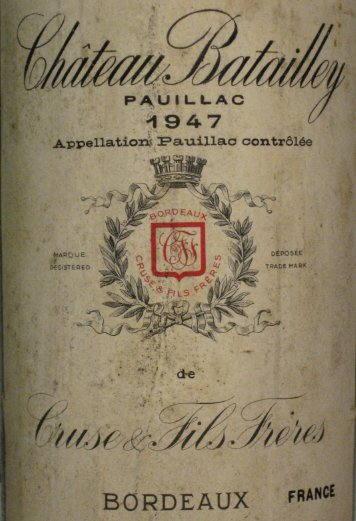
Detail of a Château Batailley 1947 label

Château Batailley is a winery in the Pauillac appellation of the Bordeaux region of France. The wine produced at the estate was classified as one of eighteen Cinquièmes Crus (Fifth Growths) in the Bordeaux Wine Official Classification of 1855.

== History ==
The current name has been in use since the end of the 18th century, when the vineyard was owned by the Saint-Martin family. The property then saw a succession of owners and temporary partition until the estate was largely restored and expanded by Daniel Guestier of Barton & Guestier after 1816.

The estate was first mentioned in classification by Abraham Lawton in 1815, as a "fifth growth" under the name of "Bedou", and in 1846 by Charles Cocks under the name of proprietor Guestier. By Guestier's death in 1847 Batailley was established as a fifth cru ahead of the 1855 Médoc classification.

Brothers François and Marcel Borie purchased the estate in 1932, and in 1942 divided it into the two properties that are today Batailley and Haut-Batailley, in order to prevent future difficulties with inheritance laws. The larger part, which included the château, became the sole property of Marcel Borie until his death in 1961, when it passed to his daughter Denise and her husband Emile Castéja.

Batailley is currently owned by the Castéja family, whose Borie-Manoux holdings also include the Pauillac fifth growth Château Lynch-Moussas and the Saint-Émilion estate Château Trotte Vieille.

== Production ==
The vineyard area extends to 57 hectares (140 acres), planted with 70% Cabernet Sauvignon, 25% Merlot, 3% Cabernet Franc and 2% Petit Verdot.

Around 22,000 cases (2,000 hl) of the grand vin Château Batailley are produced each year. The second wine, introduced in 2016, is Lions de Batailley.
