= Labarde =

- Commune
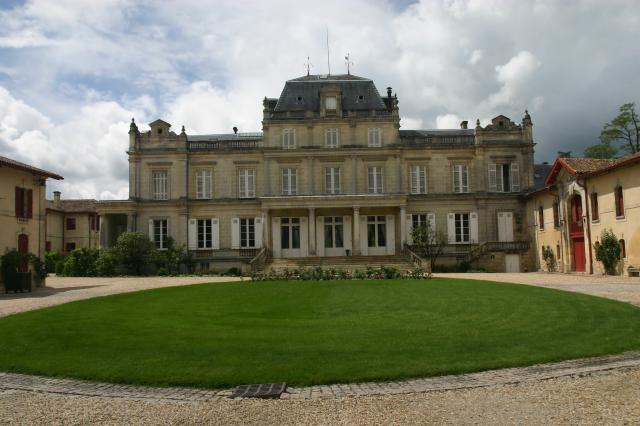
- Chateau Giscours

- Coat of arms
- Location of Labarde
- Location within France Location within Nouvelle-Aquitaine
- Coordinates: 45°00′57″N 0°38′20″W
- Country: France
- Region: Nouvelle-Aquitaine
- Department: Gironde
- Arrondissement: Lesparre-Médoc
- Canton: Le Sud-Médoc
- Intercommunality: Médoc Estuaire

Government
  - Mayor (2020–2026): Matthieu Fonmarty
- Area^{1}: 4.76 km^{2} (1.84 sq mi)
- Elevation: 16 m (52 ft)
- Highest elevation: 17 m (56 ft)
- Lowest elevation: 2 m (6.6 ft)
- Population (2023): 623
  - Density: 131/km^{2} (339/sq mi)
- Time zone: UTC+01:00 (CET)
  - Summer (DST): UTC+02:00 (CEST)
- INSEE/Postal code: 33211 /33460
- ^{1} French Land Register data, which excludes lakes, ponds, glaciers > 1 km^{2} (0.386 sq mi or 247 acres) and river estuaries.

Labarde (French pronunciation: [labaʁd]; Occitan: La Barda) is a commune in the Gironde department in Nouvelle-Aquitaine in southwestern France.

== Population ==
Historical population
Year	Pop.	±% p.a.
1968	435	—
1975	445	+0.33%
1982	453	+0.25%
1990	695	+5.50%
1999	635	−1.00%
2007	621	−0.28%
2012	612	−0.29%
2017	591	−0.70%
2023	623	+0.88%
Source: INSEE

== See also ==
- Communes of the Gironde department
