= Château Lynch-Moussas =

Winery in Bordeaux, France

Coordinates: 45.18363°N 0.79317°W

1996 vintage

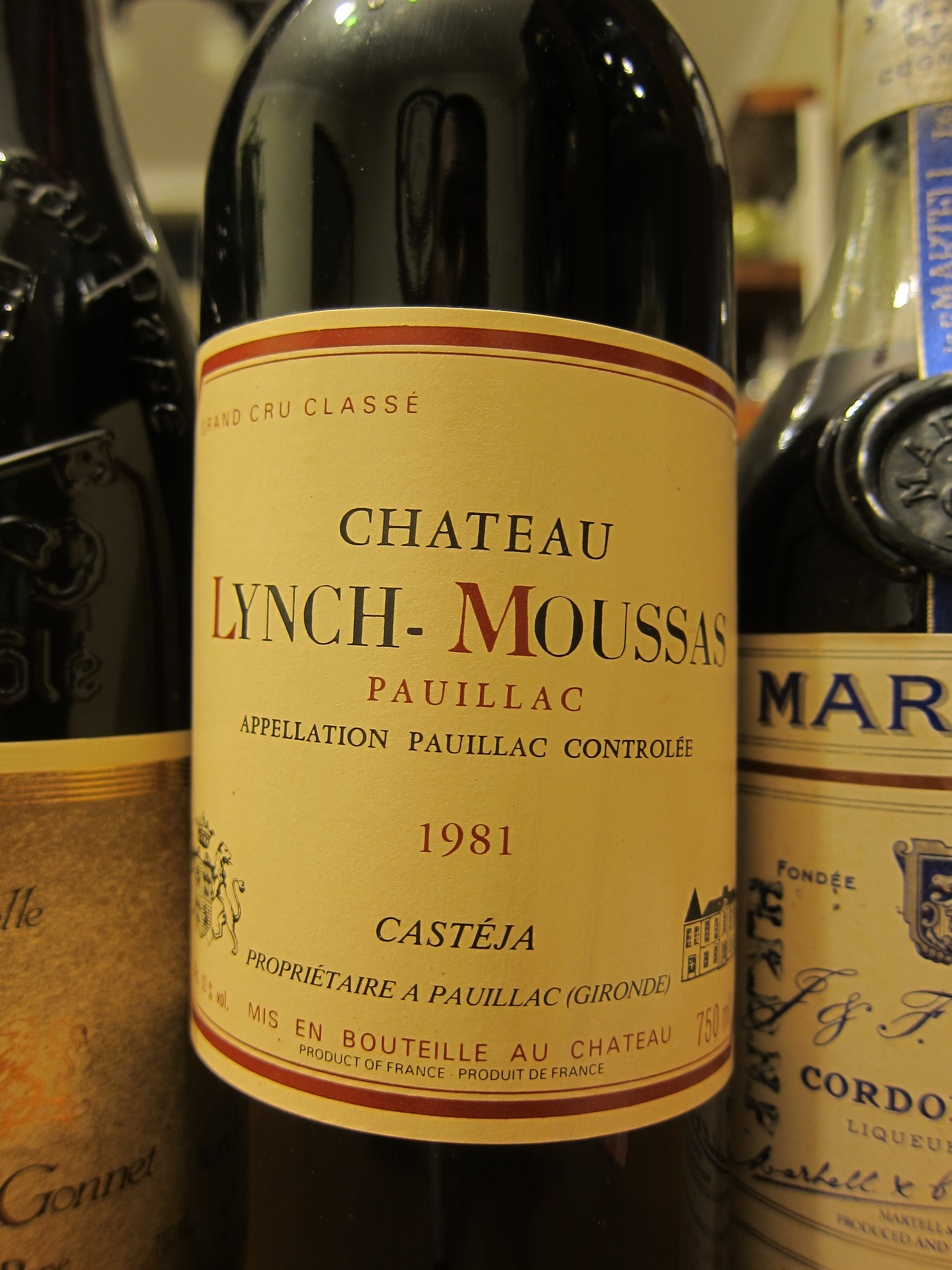

Château Lynch-Moussas is a French winery in the Pauillac appellation of the Bordeaux region of France. Château Lynch-Moussas is also the name of the red wine produced by this property. The wine produced here was classified as one of eighteen Cinquièmes Crus (Fifth Growths) in the Bordeaux Wine Official Classification of 1855.

== History ==
The estate was first owned by the Lynch family originally from Ireland, notably including the Count Jean-Baptiste Lynch in the 18th century, and was at the time much larger than it is today.

In 1919 it was purchased by the Castéja family, and sole control was eventually consolidated to Emile Castéja in 1969 by which time the estate had become dilapidated and work to restore the property was initiated. Since then a complete overhaul of the vineyards and winemaking facilities has been completed in an effort to improve its wine. In the Borie-Manoux portfolio of the Castéja family, the château is owned in conjunction with the fifth growth Château Batailley.

== Production ==
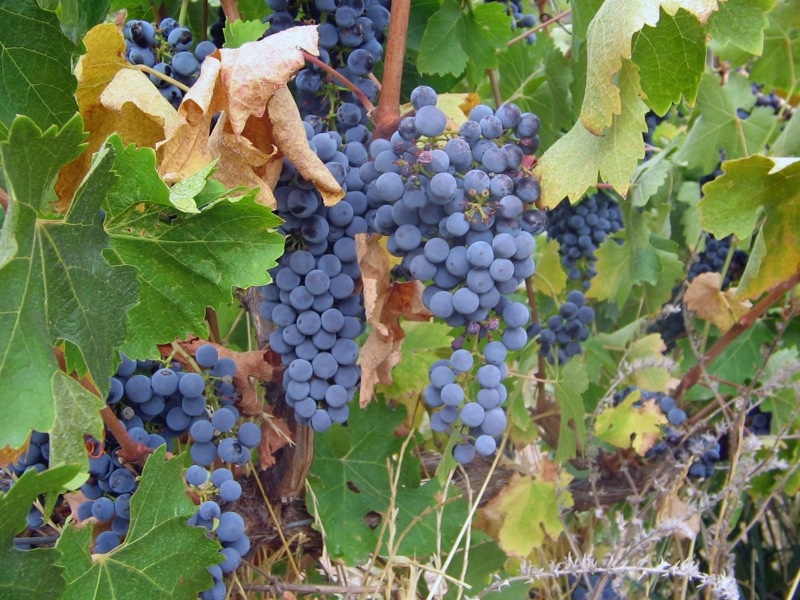
Cabernet Sauvignon

Château Lynch-Moussas' wine originates from the estate's vineyards morcellated through the commune of Pauillac. The soil for these vineyards is typical of the Pauillac consisting mostly of gravel over a limestone subsoil. The vineyard area extends 60 hectares (150 acres) with a grape variety distribution of 70% Cabernet Sauvignon and 30% Merlot.

There is an annual production of 20,000 cases (1,800 hl) of the grand vin Chateau Lynch-Moussas, as well as production of the second wine under the label Les Hauts de Lynch-Moussas.
