= Jean-Baptiste Lynch =

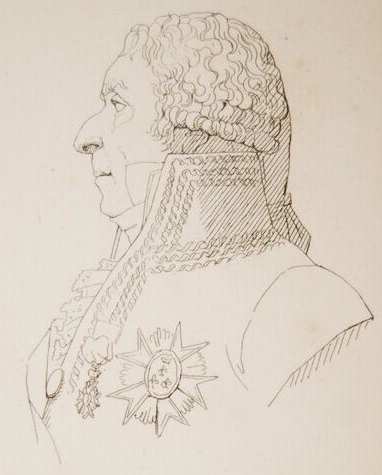
- Sketch of Lynch by Edme-François-Étienne Gois, made in 1815
- Born: 3 June 1749; Bordeaux, France
- Died: 15 July 1835 (aged 86); Dauzac, France
- Parent(s): Thomas Lynch, Esquire; Lady Petronilla Drouillard
- Family: Lynch

Jean-Baptiste Lynch (3 June 1749 – 15 August 1835) was a Count of the First French Empire, Mayor of Bordeaux and a peer of France, sitting in the upper house of the French Senate. Lynch opposed the French Revolution (1789–1799), and was later imprisoned under the Reign of Terror (5 September 1793 – 8 July 1794). In 1808, he was appointed mayor of Bordeaux, and was for a time entirely devoted to Napoleon. In 1813, he contacted the royalist agents, and in 1814 he surrendered the city to the British. Louis XVIII later appointed him a peer of France.

== Biography ==
=== Early life ===
Lynch was born in 1749, the son of "Thomas Lynch, Esquire, and Lady Petronilla Drouillard". His father's family were of Irish origin, being one of the Tribes of Galway. In an ancient, but small notability, the Catholic Lynch family had to flee persecution and seek refuge in Bordeaux in the seventeenth century. John Lynch, an officer in the Irish army, and grandfather of Jean-Baptiste, settled there and became naturalised in 1710, but he did not succeed in his trade integration. Thomas Lynch made a rich marriage by marrying the daughter of treasurer Pierre Drouillard.

Lynch was destined by his father to become a lawyer. He was appointed to advise the Bordeaux Parliament in December 1770, and received this position in 1771. He married the daughter of Berthon Leberthon, the first president of the parliament. When his stepfather was elected as a deputy from Bordeaux to the Estates General of 1789, Lynch followed him to Paris and publicly professed his opinions, which earned him being imprisoned during the Terror. He was released after Thermidor.

=== Mayor of Bordeaux ===
Named General council under the French Consulate, he was appointed by the Emperor as mayor of Bordeaux. He later became a member of the Nobility of the First French Empire and a Chevalier of the Legion of Honour.

=== Lynch delivers the city ===
Lynch chose to join the House of Bourbon after he was not faithful to Napoleon because he did not agree with his oaths. During the Hundred Days, Lynch fled to England. He returned to France during the Bourbon Restoration, when Louis XVIII made him a peer of France.
