= Jon Winroth =

American wine critic and educator

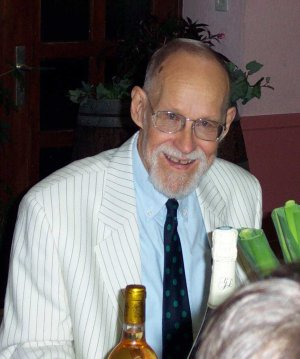
- Jon Winroth after receiving the distinction of Chevalier de l'Ordre du Mérite Agricole, May 30, 2004
- Born: Jon Winroth Broneer; November 13, 1935; Athens, Greece
- Died: July 15, 2006; Tours, France
- Education: Sorbonne
- Occupation: Wine critic
- Spouse: Doreen
- Children: Eric, George
- Parent(s): Oscar Broneer, Verna Pauline Anderson

Jon Winroth Broneer (November 13, 1935, in Athens, Greece – July 15, 2006, in Tours, France) was an American wine critic who lived and worked in France.

== Biography ==
Second son of Oscar Broneer, a Swedish immigrant to the United States who became a professor of archaeology, Jon Winroth spent part of his childhood in Greece but was mainly educated in the U.S., where he met his future wife, Doreen. After finishing his college studies summa cum laude and winning a Fulbright grant, he and Doreen sailed for France aboard the Liberté. There he discovered an approach to life that suited his own outlook, and he stayed, forging an international career in wine and building a family.

Broneer began by studying French, which lead to his Fulbright grant and a year of study in Poitiers. He worked on a Doctorat d'université at the Sorbonne on Ali Pasha of Yannina, and spent 1964 to 1966 in Greece studying fortresses built by Ali Pasha in Epirus.

=== Wine career ===
Back in France, his interest in gastronomy and wine grew, from a passing interest which early friends in France had sparked to a serious search for what eluded him. Winroth published his first article on wine on January 31, 1967, in the international edition of The New York Times, using his first and middle names — the middle (Winroth), a maternal family name, means "wine root" in old Swedish. The article concerned the "Coupe du meilleur pot", a distinction awarded annually by the gastronomic journal La Table et la Route and by the Académie Rabelais to a Paris bistrot for its good, typical grower wines. Subsequently, he appeared regularly in this paper, which in 1967 became the International Herald Tribune.

From the end of the 60s to the early 70s, Winroth also translated the articles of the La Revue du vin de France (RVF) for its English-language edition. As a member of the staff, he participated in the events it sponsored and its wine-tastings in the field, continuing his wine education through such notable tasters as Odette Kahn (editor of the RVF), Richard Olney and Robert Gauffard, who were both esteemed contributors.

His first son, Eric, was born in 1968 and his second, George, in 1970.

In 1972 he founded the Académie du Vin with Steven Spurrier and led many of the wine-tasting courses given there. The Académie du Vin appeared in worldwide headlines in 1976, the bicentennial of the American Declaration of Independence, for a blind tasting of top American and French wines.

In 1973 Winroth enrolled in a tasting course for wine growers given by Professor Émile Peynaud at the University of Bordeaux. He stayed with M. Wainstein, a wine broker. After a full day of intense classes and wine-tastings, Wainstein would subject him to a blind tasting of about ten wines. Exhausted, Winroth felt he could not distinguish a Beaujolais from a Bordeaux wine. Finally, the last evening, the miracle occurred: he identified each wine correctly, and even picked out the "pirate", a foreign wine. He said that evening gave him almost as much pleasure as the certificate signed by Professor Peynaud.

=== Illness ===
Late in 1973 Winroth became severely ill and was hospitalized in intensive care for over three weeks. A familial disease had progressively reduced his kidney function, and to survive he would have to undergo twice-weekly dialysis. Chronic hemodialysis was not available in centers at that time, and treatment would have to be done at home, attended by his wife, who already had assumed the psychological and financial aspects of the situation. He quickly learned the techniques and he and Doreen set about organizing their life and that of their sons to include home dialysis. Admittedly, a wine critic who cannot urinate is at a certain disadvantage.

=== Career in French Magazines ===
In 1979, Jon Winroth began writing in French as well as English. He was invited to speak on his technique of long dialysis and long intervals between dialyses (the contrary is the rule) at a meeting of the National Kidney Foundation by Professor Robert Swenson of Stanford University. Gambro kindly paid for his trip, Prof. Swenson put him up and another nephrologist offered free dialysis. Between the sessions of the meeting and the obligatory dialysis sessions, he found time to see 17 top California wine-makers. Returning with 13 bottles in his luggage, he sneaked out the "Nothing to declare" exit unquestioned. These 13 bottles were tasted at a memorable meal at the Trou Gascon, Alain Dutournier's early restaurant, and Jon Winroth's following article in Lui contributed to the increasing interest in California wines among French wine lovers.

This appearance in Lui, and the monthly column that the editor, Jean-Pierre Binchet, subsequently created for him, initially raised the hackles of his French colleagues. After some months, however, Jon Winroth became a fully accepted part of the French-language wine scene. Soon he was asked to contribute to Cuisine et vins de France and the Revue du Vin de France. Eventually, his "wine of the month" column in Lui was moved to Elle, where it appeared weekly. While he was appearing in both Elle and Lui, his French colleagues offered all the expected sexually-oriented jokes.

In addition to his regular articles in International Herald Tribune, the Revue du vin de France and Cuisine et Vins de France, he continued to contribute to La Table et la route and Elle International. Also in 1979, Jon Winroth wrote of another memorable tasting, that of a 1799 Lafite-Rothschild in Paris. Another high point was a controversial article on the rosés of Provence that appeared in Lui in 1979, in which he outspokenly criticized the mediocrity and laisser-aller of this wine region which had an immense unused potential for producing good wine. Threatened lawsuits were finally laid to rest, but the Winroths noticed that the following year advertisements for Provence wines were emphasizing the reds and whites, not the rosés. The frankness of Jon Winroth's articles progressively gained him a solid reputation of intransigence in wine circles. Steven Spurrier described his style in Decanter as "vociferously vocal".

In 1981 the International Herald Tribune published his book, Wine As You Like It, which aimed to open the world of wine to the amateur.

After meeting Jacques Dupont and Pierre Crisol, who were then the wine editors for Gault Millau, and finding their approach to tasting very close to his own, he created with them La Cote des Vins, a bi-weekly newsletter for wine professionals. This publication reported their tasting results and comments, sometimes the result of tastings of 200 wines in one day.

=== Moving and Retirement ===
With the children grown and gone and the attractions of Paris outweighed by its increasing noise and pollution, Jon Winroth and Doreen followed the TGV line toward Tours and found a small house in front of a large cave in a calcareous hillside near Montoire-sur-le-Loir in the coteaux du Vendômois. Jon Winroth closely followed the progress of these local wines and shared the joy of his winemaker friends when they finally attained Appellation d'origine contrôlée status in 2000. He continued writing, with samples arriving by mail and truck and articles dispatched by fax, until his retirement in 2000.

He was made a Chevalier de l'Ordre du Mérite Agricole in 2004.

Jon Winroth died in the Clinique Saint-Gatien in Tours on July 15, 2006, at the age of 70, of complications of his renal disease, after 32 1/2 years of home dialysis.

== See also ==
- List of wine personalities
