= Michel Dovaz =

Swiss wine critic and food writer (1928–2023)

- Dovaz in 2008
- Born: 14 August 1928; Geneva, Switzerland
- Died: 8 December 2023 (aged 95)
- Occupations: Wine critic, food writer and journalist

Michel Dovaz (14 August 1928 – 8 December 2023) was a Swiss wine critic and food writer.

== Career ==
Born in Geneva on 14 August 1928, he started his career as a journalist in Paris and later taught wine courses at the Académie du Vin in Paris when he served as a judge at the Paris Wine Tasting of 1976. He subsequently wrote several books on French wine as well as the chapter on Champagne for the Guide Hachette des Vins.

== Car collections ==
Dovaz owned a collection of over 50 vintage cars, which he stored on his estate south of Paris up to 1984. The collection consisted of prewar and postwar cars of the most luxurious brands (among them are nine Bugattis, nine Lancias, four Alfa Romeos, four Lincolns, two Ferraris, two Lotuses, two Rolls-Royces and two Bentleys). The collection became famous when a German photographer was allowed to take photos of the neglected cars in 1983 in Dovaz's garden south of Paris. Most of the cars have been sold since then and many have been restored, but some of them remained untouched.

Two books have been written about the Dovaz car collection. The first was 'Sleeping Beauties' (1986/2007/2013) which showed the collection in its dilapidated 'as found' state. The book brought unwanted attention to the Dovaz collection. The second book 'The Fate of the Sleeping Beauties' (published in 2008 in Dutch, 2009 in English, 2011 in French and 2015 in German) gives additional information about Michel Dovaz and how the collection came to be. In addition, the book tells the story of what happened to the collection and the single cars.

== Death ==
Dovaz died on 8 December 2023, at the age of 95.

== See also ==
- List of wine personalities
