= Odette Kahn =

French wine expert

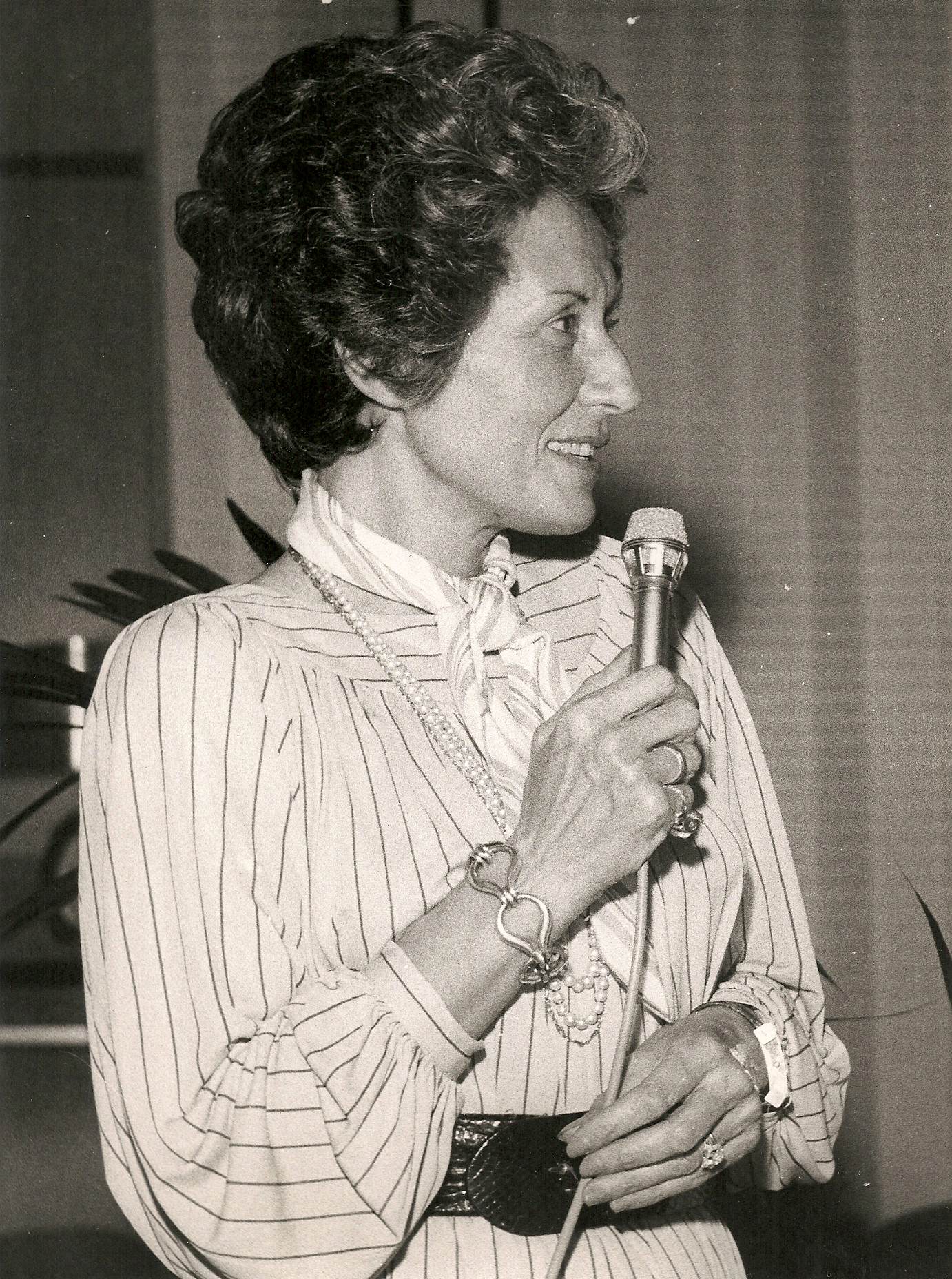
- Born: Odette Netter; 18 March 1923; Paris, France
- Died: 14 November 1982 (aged 59); Boulogne-Billancourt, France
- Education: HEC Jeunes Filles
- Occupation: Wine critic
- Awards: Chevalier du Mérite National; Chevalier du Mérite Agricole; Medal of the City of Paris

Odette Kahn (French pronunciation: [ɔdɛt kan], 1923–1982) was a leading authority on wine and editor of the La Revue du vin de France (Review of French wine) and of Cuisine et Vins de France (Food and Wines of France). She was a judge at the historic Paris Wine Tasting of 1976. Kahn was outraged at the results of the tasting, unsuccessfully demanded her ballot back, refused later to speak to organizer Steven Spurrier after the event, claimed fraud, and wrote disparagingly about the wine competition. This event was later portrayed in the movie Bottle Shock.

== Biography ==
Kahn was an expert in the field of French gastronomy and wines, for which she was a well-known ambassador throughout the world.

After completing studies in business at HEC Jeunes Filles, she became assistant director and later editor-in-chief of two magazines, Cuisine et Vins de France and Revue du Vin de France. In 1968, after the death of Madeleine Decure, Kahn became director of Société Française d'Éditions Vinicoles, publisher of Cuisine et Vins de France and Revue du Vin de France.

She was a member of the International Academy of Wine, as well as 40 wine and gastronomy fraternities throughout the world. She is the author of the cookbook La Petite et la Grande Cuisine, published by Calmann-Lévy in 1977. She also collaborated in the writing of several other books, including Cuisine sans Souci (1974) and La Vraie Cuisine de l'Alsace (1976).

Until the early 1980s, she was in charge of the national Meilleur sommelier de France competition and served as general secretary of the Association des Restauratrices Cuisinières, which she cofounded with Annie Desvignes. Kahn also founded the Amitiés Gastronomiques Internationales association.

She participated in numerous radio and television broadcasts, and was a member of the jury in some of the most renowned gastronomic contests. She received many awards, including the Chevalier du Mérite National, Chevalier du Mérite Agricole, and the Medal of the City of Paris.

During the 1976 Judgement of Paris wine tasting, she unsuccessfully demanded her scorecard back after rating two Californian wines higher than any French one.

== Published work ==
- La petite et la grande cuisine: 300 recettes, 60 menus, 60 fiches techniques (French Edition), Calmann-Lévy, 1 January 1977

== See also ==
- List of wine personalities
