= Mayacamas =

Mayacamas may refer to:

- Mayacamas Mountains or Mayacmas Mountains, in Napa Valley, California
- Mayacamas Vineyards, a California wine producer
