= Domaine Roulot =

Winery in Burgundy, France

Domaine Roulot is a winery in Meursault, Côte de Beaune, Burgundy, France. It is run by Jean-Marc Roulot since 1989.

== History ==
The domaine was founded in 1830 by Guillaume Roulot, and has 16 hectares (40 acres) of vineyards. it is led by Jean-Marc Roulot, who produces organic wine since 1989.

The 1973 vintage of Roulot's white premier cru wine Meursault Charmes was ranked second in the historic Judgment of Paris wine competition. Meursault Charmes Roulot also featured in the Great Chardonnay Showdown in 1980.

== Vineyard, viticulture and winemaking ==
In the vineyard, Roulot holds Chardonnay parcelles from Meursault 1er Cru, Meursault Village and Bourgogne, as well some Village parcelles in Auxey-Duresses (0.48 Ha). In Pinot Noir, the domaine produces from parcelles in Monthelie (0.36 Ha) and Auxey-Duresses 1er Cru (0.47 Ha). In Meursault 1er Cru, Domaine Roulot vinifies the Meursault 1er Cru Les Perrières (0.26 Ha, planted in 1964), Meursault 1er Cru Clos des Bouchères (1.38 Ha, planted in 1980), Meursault 1er Cru Porusot (0.42 Ha, planted in 1959), Meursault 1er Cru Les Charmes (0.28 Ha, planted in 1942), Meursault 1er Cru Champs Fulliots (0.19 Ha, planted in 1989). In the Meursault lieux-dit holdings stand at Meursault Les Tillets (0.49 Ha, planted in 1974), Meursault Les Meix Chavaux (0.95 Ha, planted in 1929, 1947, 1957, 1975, 1983, 1996 ), Meursault Les Vireuils (0.67 Ha planted in 1956), Meursault Les Narvaux (0.50 Ha, planted in 1960), Meursault A Mon Plaisir, Clos du Haut Tessons (0.85 Ha, planted in 1961) and Meursault les Luchets (1.03 Ha, planted in 1948, 1961, 1976 & 1974). Furthermore there is a Bourgogne Blanc (2.64 Ha, planted in 1955, 1988, 1990, 1992, 1996, 1999) also produced by the domaine and a Bourgogne Aligoté (0.77 Ha, planted in 1922, 1996). This totals roughly 8.80 hectares (21.7 acres) of outright vines in the Domaine

In addition to these parcelles, the Domaine also procures grapes in other vineyards to vinify them, from parcelles such as Meursault 1er Cru Genevrières, this adds a few Hectars to the production every year for a total production spanning between 13 Ha and 16 Ha.

Les Perrières was purchased by the Domaine Roulot in 1976 with vines planted in 1940, it produces one of the most sought after wines of the domaine.

The vinifaction is broadly light in sulfurs, especially since 2016 when Jean-Marc started experimenting with lower doses at the start of fermentation. The white wines are all aged in oak barrels, with the exception of Aligoté which is only vinified in steel tank, for a minimum if 12 months before spending a further 6 month in steel tank. The proportion of new oak from 5% for the Bourgogne, 20% for the Village and 20-30% for the 1er Cru depending on the year.

== See also ==
- Burgundy wine
- Côte de Beaune
- Meursault
