= Judgment of Paris (wine) =

1976 wine competition in Paris

The Paris Wine Tasting of 1976, also known as the Judgment of Paris, was a wine competition to commemorate the United States Bicentennial, organized in Paris, France, on 24 May 1976. In the competition, French oenophiles participated in two blind tasting comparisons: one of top-quality Chardonnays and another of red wines (Bordeaux wines from France and Cabernet Sauvignon wines from California). A wine from Napa County, California was rated best in each category, which caused surprise as France was generally regarded as being the foremost producer of the world's best wines.

By the early 1970s, the quality of some California wines was outstanding, but few took notice, as the market favored French brands. Steven Spurrier, a British wine merchant, and his American colleague, Patricia Gallagher, organized the competition. Spurrier sold predominantly French wines and believed the California wines would not be favored by the judges.

The event's informal name "Judgment of Paris" is an allusion to the ancient Greek myth.

== The wines ==
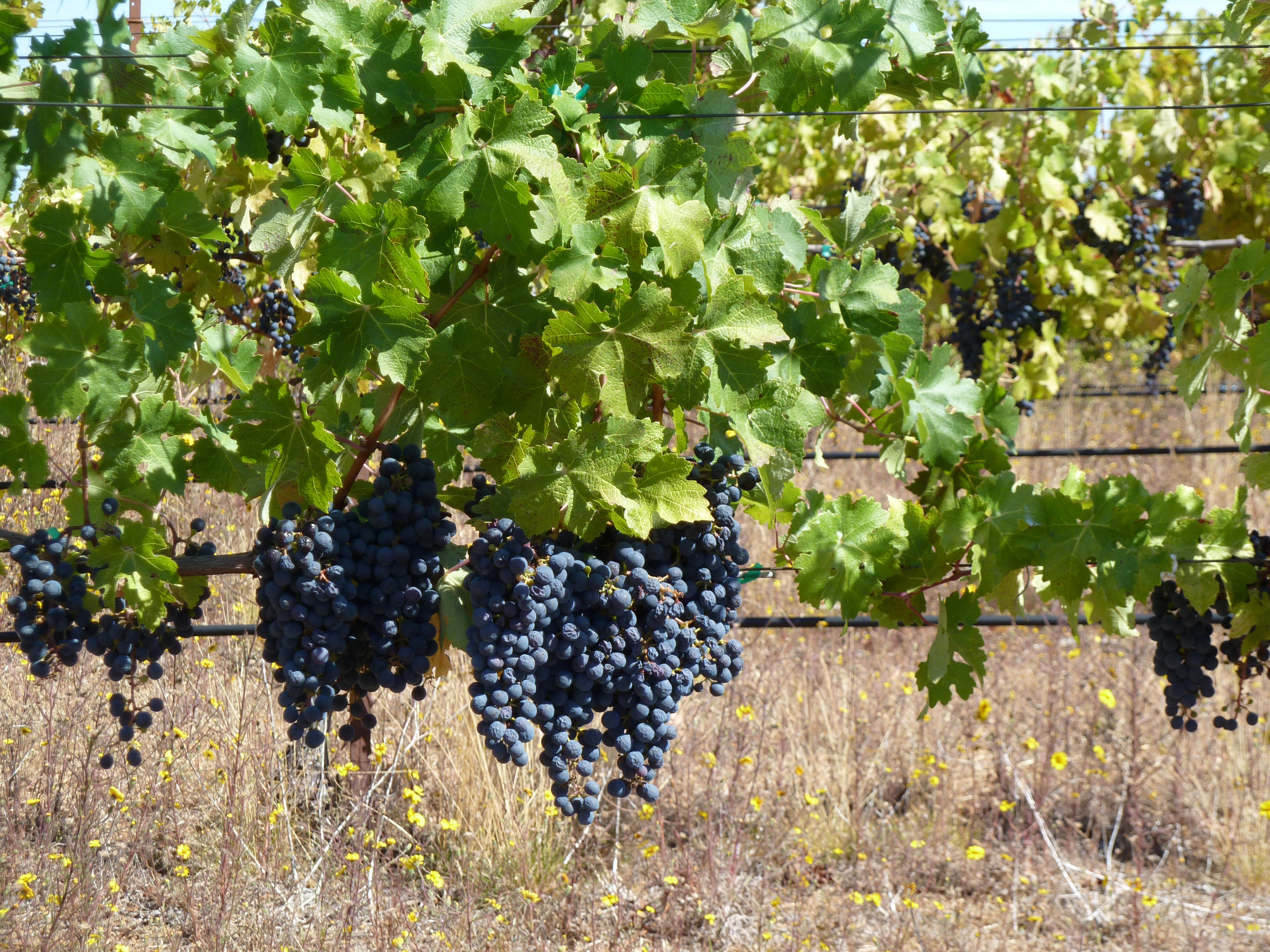
Cabernet Sauvignon grapes from Ridge's Monte Bello vineyard.

Red wines

California Cabernet Sauvignon	Vintage	Bordeaux	Vintage
Stag's Leap Wine Cellars	1973	Château Mouton-Rothschild	1970
Ridge Vineyards Monte Bello	1971	Château Montrose	1970
Heitz Wine Cellars Martha's Vineyard	1970	Château Haut-Brion	1970
Clos Du Val Winery	1972	Château Leoville Las Cases	1971
Mayacamas Vineyards	1971		
Freemark Abbey Winery	1969		

White wines

California Chardonnay	Vintage	Burgundies	Vintage
Chateau Montelena	1973	Meursault Charmes Roulot	1973
Chalone Vineyard	1974	Beaune Clos des Mouches Joseph Drouhin	1973
Spring Mountain Vineyard	1973	Batard-Montrachet Ramonet-Prudhon	1973
Freemark Abbey Winery	1972	Puligny-Montrachet Les Pucelles Domaine Leflaive	1972
Veedercrest Vineyards	1972		
David Bruce Winery	1973		

== The judges ==
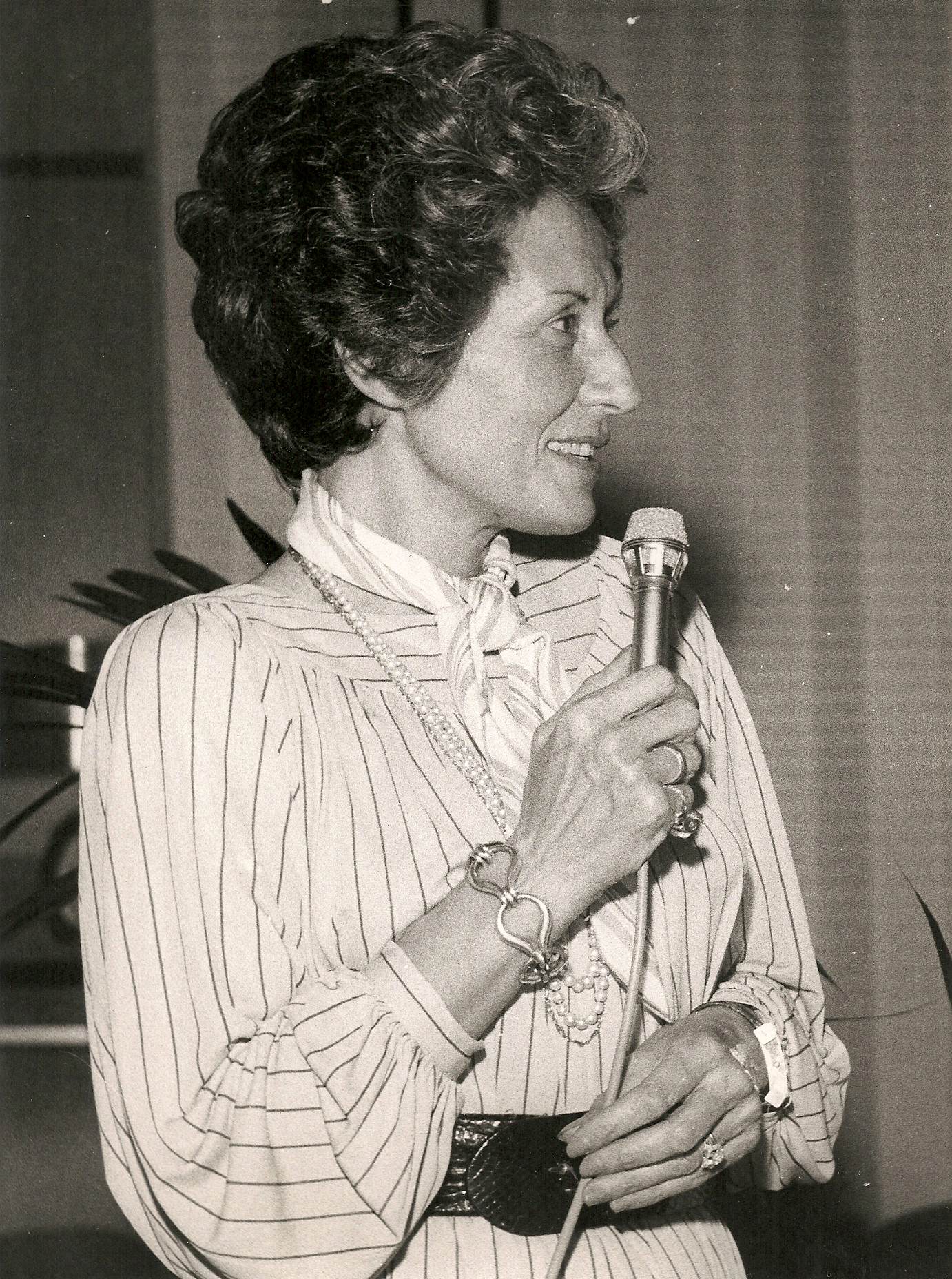
When the results were announced French judge Odette Kahn demanded her ballot back and later criticized the Paris tasting.

The eleven judges were (in alphabetical order):

- Pierre Brejoux (French) inspector general of Appellation d'Origine Controlee Board
- Claude Dubois-Millot (French) director of Le Nouveau Guide (substitute for Christian Millau)
- Michel Dovaz (French) of the Institut Oenologique de France
- Patricia Gallagher (American) of l'Academie du Vin.
- Odette Kahn (French) director of La Revue du vin de France
- Raymond Oliver (French) owner of Le Grand Véfour restaurant
- Steven Spurrier (British) founder of L'Academie du Vin
- Pierre Tari (French) owner of Chateau Giscours winery
- Christian Vannequé (French) sommelier of La Tour d'Argent
- Aubert de Villaine (French) co-director of the Domaine de la Romanée-Conti
- Jean-Claude Vrinat (French) owner of Taillevent restaurant

== Method ==
Blind tasting was performed and the judges were asked to grade each wine out of 20 points. No specific grading framework was given, leaving the judges free to grade according to their own criteria.

Rankings of the wines preferred by individual judges were based on the grades they individually attributed.

An overall ranking of the wines preferred by the jury was also established in averaging the sum of each judge's individual grades (arithmetic mean). However, grades of Patricia Gallagher and Steven Spurrier were not taken into account, thus counting only grades of French judges.

== The results ==
=== White wines ===
California Chardonnays vs. Burgundy Chardonnays

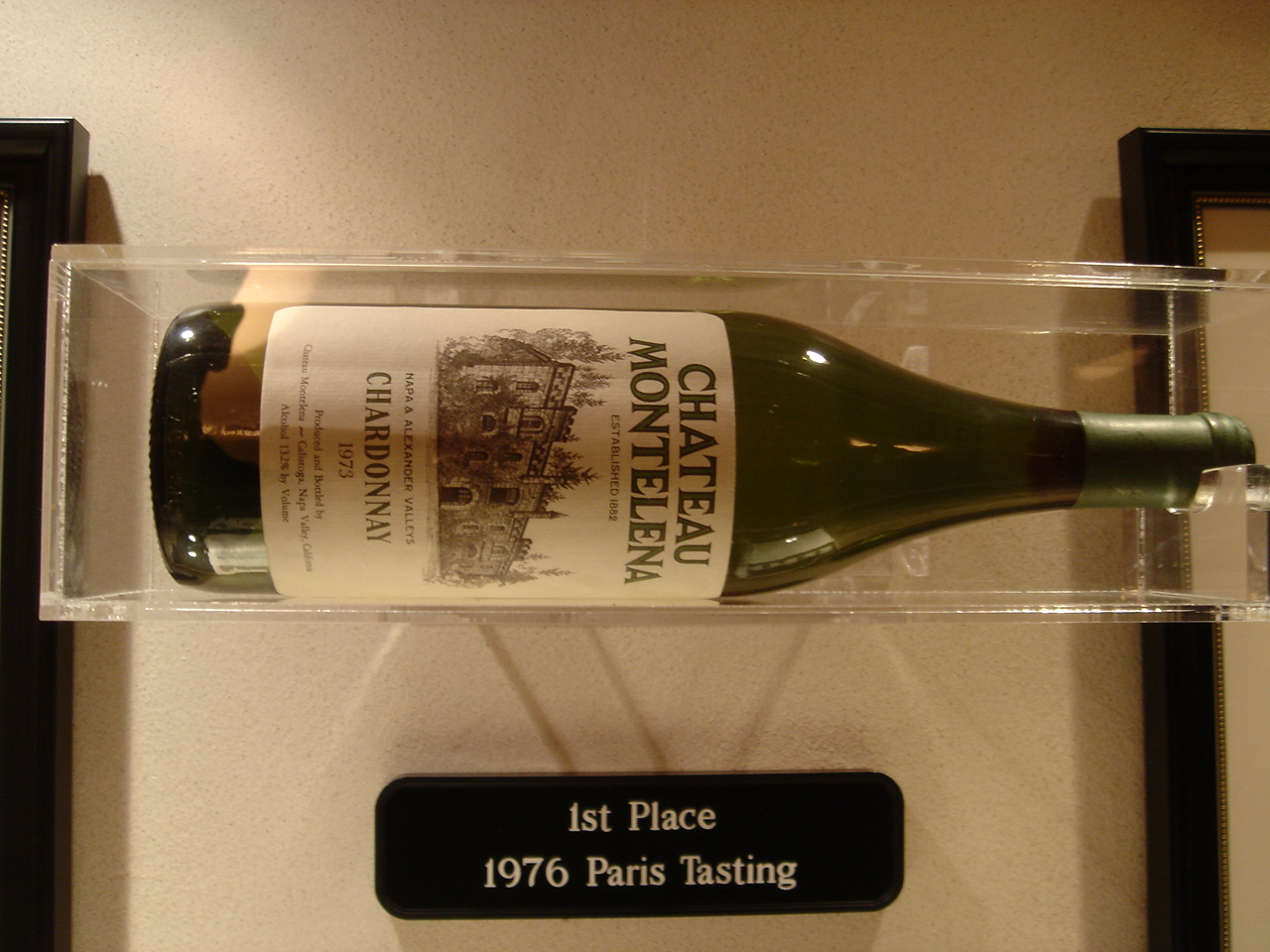
1973 Chateau Montelena Chardonnay display in the Smithsonian Museum.

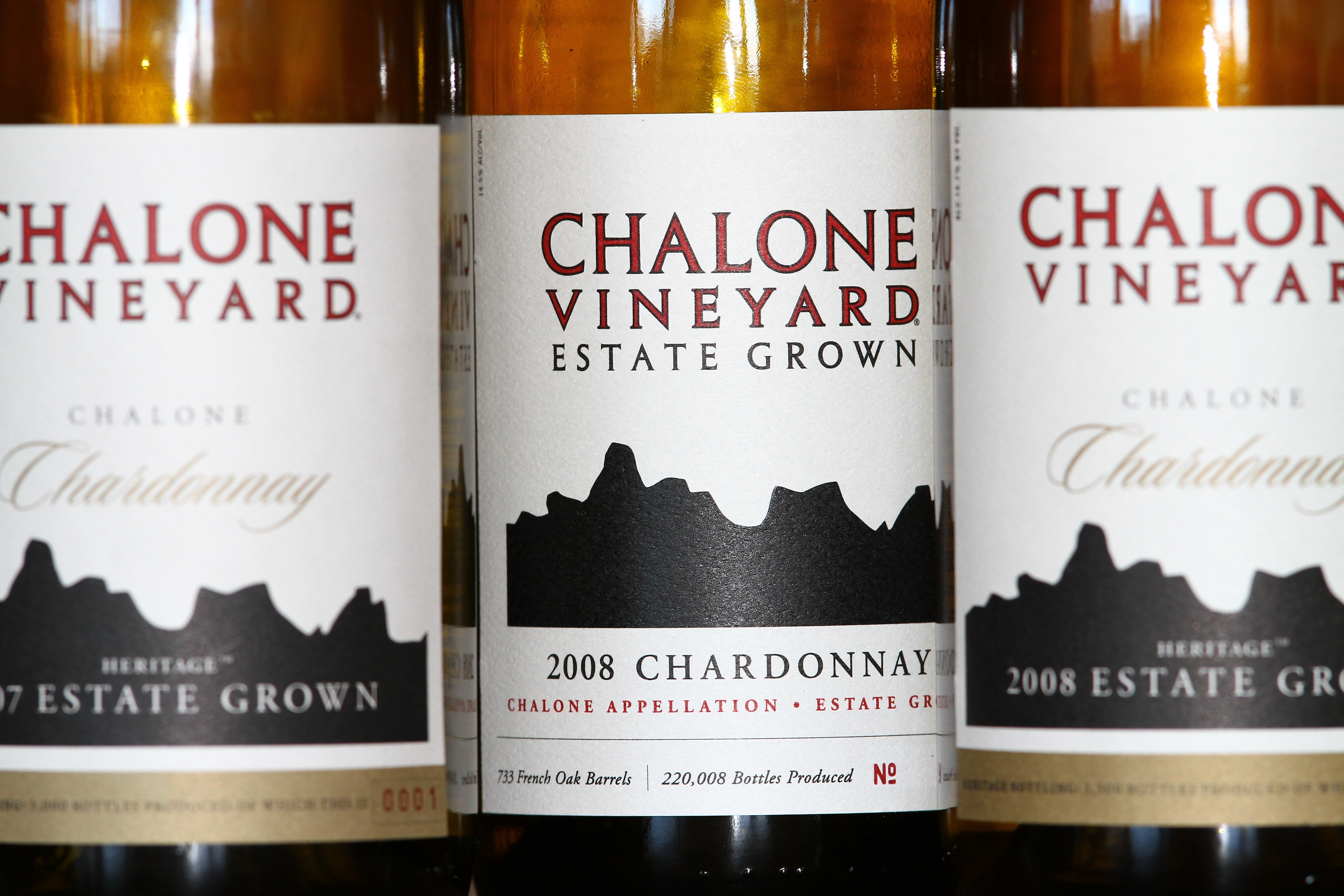
Chalone Vineyard Chardonnay of Monterey County ranked #3

Official jury results:

Rank	Grade	Wine	Vintage	Origin
1.	132	Chateau Montelena	1973	USA
2.	126.5	Meursault Charmes Roulot	1973	France
3.	121	Chalone Vineyard	1974	USA
4.	104	Spring Mountain Vineyard	1973	USA
5.	101	Beaune Clos des Mouches Joseph Drouhin	1973	France
6.	100	Freemark Abbey Winery	1972	USA
7.	94	Batard-Montrachet Ramonet-Prudhon	1973	France
8.	89	Puligny-Montrachet Les Pucelles Domaine Leflaive	1972	France
9.	88	Veedercrest Vineyards	1972	USA
10.	42	David Bruce Winery	1973	USA

=== Red wines ===
California Cabernet Sauvignon vs. Bordeaux

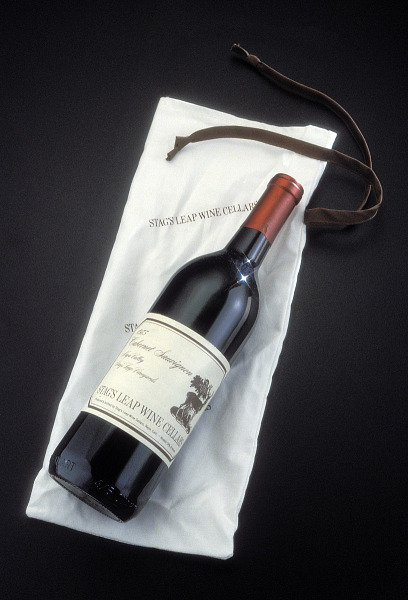
1973 Stag's Leap Wine Cellars Cabernet Sauvignon

Official jury results

Rank	Grade	Wine	Vintage	Origin
1.	127.5	Stag's Leap Wine Cellars	1973	USA
2.	126	Château Mouton-Rothschild	1970	France
3.	125.5	Château Haut-Brion	1970	France
4.	122	Château Montrose	1970	France
5.	105.5	Ridge Vineyards Monte Bello	1971	USA
6.	97	Château Leoville Las Cases	1971	France
7.	89.5	Mayacamas Vineyards	1971	USA
8.	87.5	Clos Du Val Winery	1972	USA
9.	84.5	Heitz Wine Cellars Martha's Vineyard	1970	USA
10.	78	Freemark Abbey Winery	1969	USA

Average Original grades: out of 20 points.

Rank	Grade	Wine	Vintage	Origin
1.	14.14	Stag's Leap Wine Cellars	1973	USA
2.	14.09	Château Mouton-Rothschild	1970	France
3.	13.64	Château Montrose	1970	France
4.	13.23	Château Haut-Brion	1970	France
5.	12.14	Ridge Vineyards Monte Bello	1971	USA
6.	11.18	Château Leoville Las Cases	1971	France
7.	10.36	Heitz Wine Cellars Martha's Vineyard	1970	USA
8.	10.14	Clos Du Val Winery	1972	USA
9.	9.95	Mayacamas Vineyards	1971	USA
10.	9.45	Freemark Abbey Winery	1969	USA

==== Breakdown by judge ====
The original grades (out of 20 points) are shown, in alphabetical order by judge.

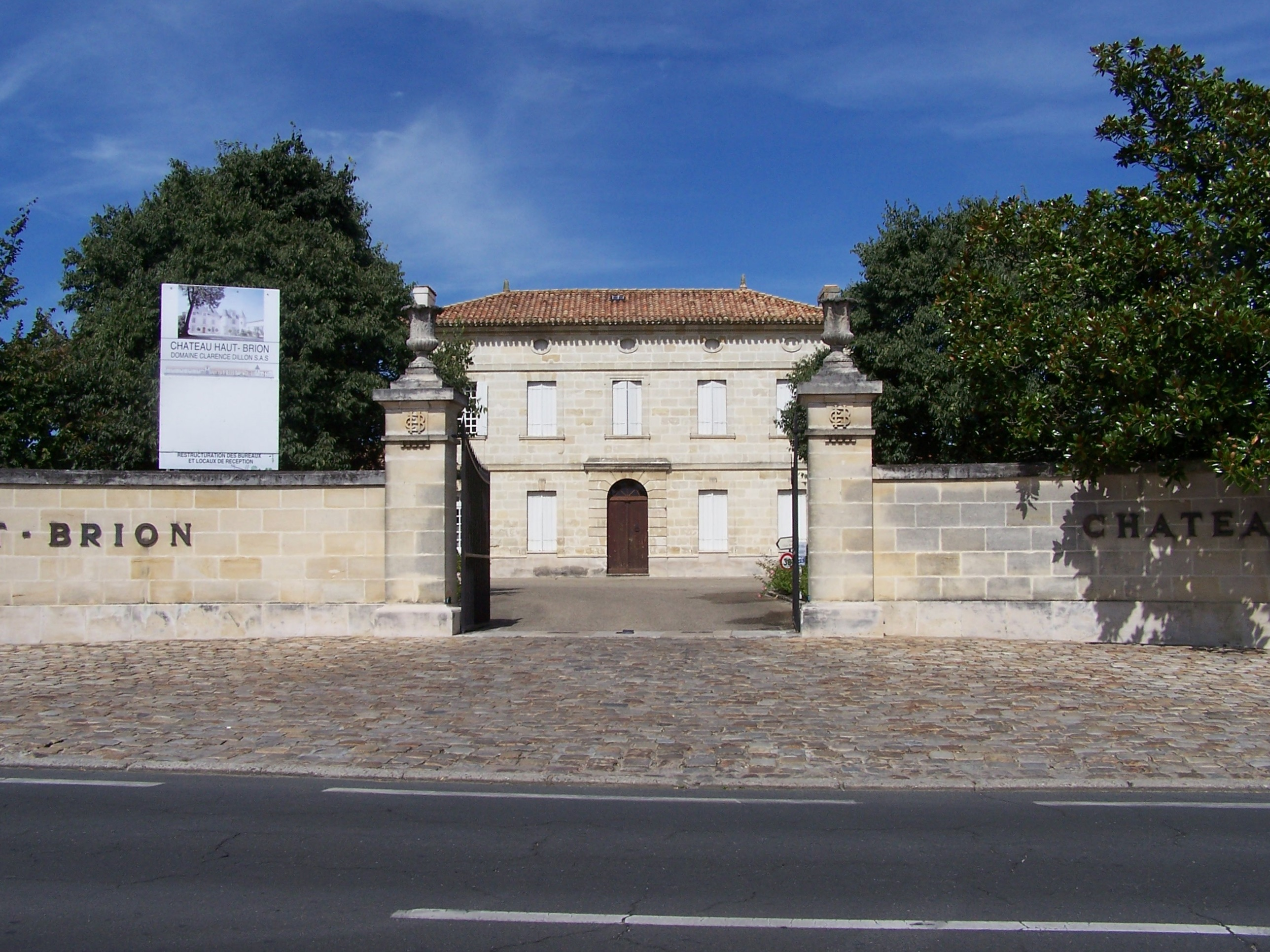
Château Haut-Brion was judge Pierre Brejoux's highest ranking red wine selection.

Pierre Brejoux Original grades: out of 20 points.

Rank	Grade	Wine	Vintage	Origin
1.	17	Château Haut-Brion	1970	France
2.	16	Château Mouton-Rothschild	1970	France
3.	14	Stag's Leap Wine Cellars	1973	USA
3.	14	Clos Du Val Winery	1972	USA
5.	13	Ridge Vineyards Monte Bello	1971	USA
6.	12	Château Montrose	1970	France
6.	12	Heitz Wine Cellars Martha's Vineyard	1970	USA
8.	10	Château Leoville Las Cases	1971	France
9.	7	Mayacamas Vineyards	1971	USA
10.	5	Freemark Abbey Winery	1969	USA

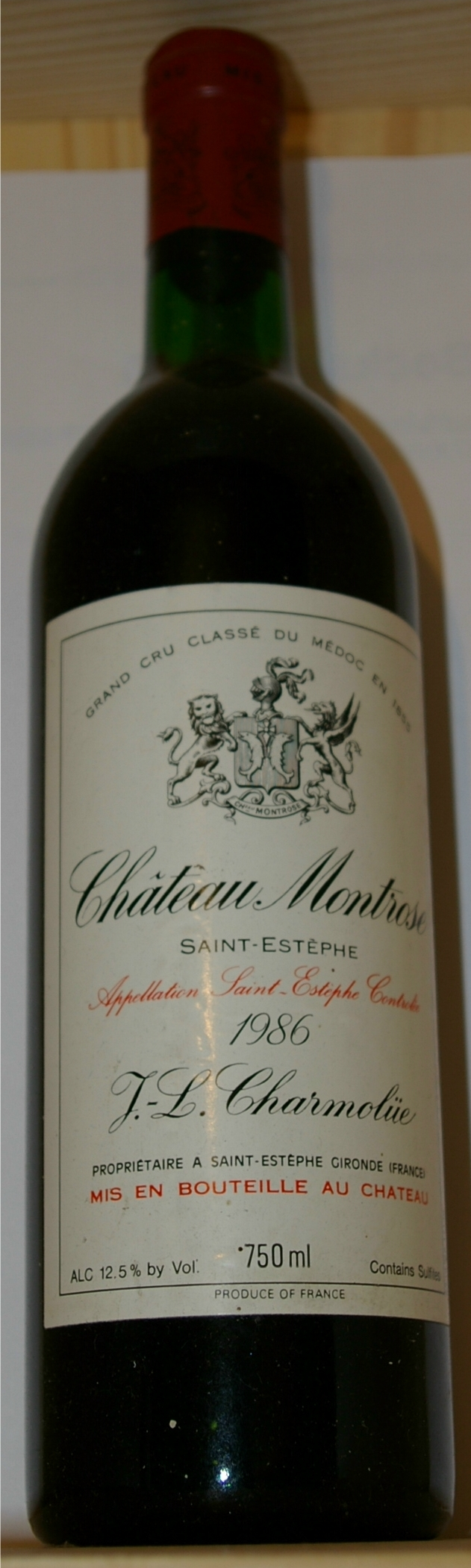
Château Montrose was judge Claude Dubois-Millot's highest ranking red wine.

Claude Dubois-Millot Original grades: out of 20 points.

Rank	Grade	Wine	Vintage	Origin
1.	17	Château Montrose	1970	France
2.	16	Château Mouton-Rothschild	1970	France
2.	16	Stag's Leap Wine Cellars	1973	USA
4.	13.5	Château Haut-Brion	1970	France
5.	11	Château Leoville Las Cases	1971	France
6.	9.5	Mayacamas Vineyards	1971	USA
7.	9	Freemark Abbey Winery	1969	USA
7.	9	Clos Du Val Winery	1972	USA
9.	8	Heitz Wine Cellars Martha's Vineyard	1970	USA
10.	7	Ridge Vineyards Monte Bello	1971	USA

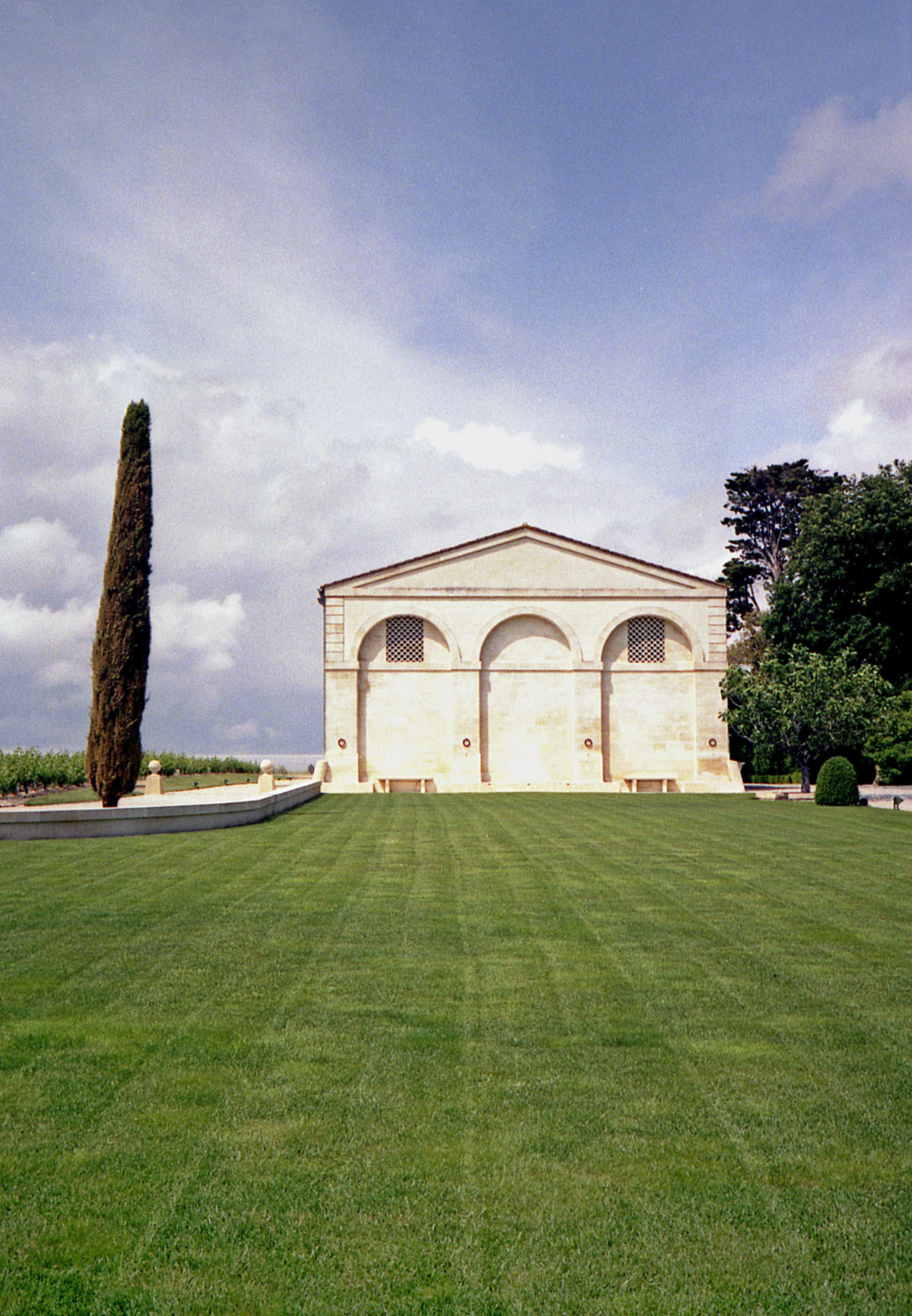
Chateau Mouton Rothschild was judge Michel Dovaz's highest ranking red wine.

Michel Dovaz Original grades: out of 20 points.

Rank	Grade	Wine	Vintage	Origin
1.	15	Château Mouton-Rothschild	1970	France
1.	15	Freemark Abbey Winery	1969	USA
3.	12	Château Haut-Brion	1970	France
3.	12	Ridge Vineyards Monte Bello	1971	USA
5.	11	Château Montrose	1970	France
5.	11	Heitz Wine Cellars Martha's Vineyard	1970	USA
5.	11	Clos Du Val Winery	1972	USA
8.	10	Château Leoville Las Cases	1971	France
8.	10	Stag's Leap Wine Cellars	1973	USA
10.	8	Mayacamas Vineyards	1971	USA

Patricia Gallagher Original grades: out of 20 points.

Rank	Grade	Wine	Vintage	Origin
1.	17	Heitz Wine Cellars Martha's Vineyard	1970	USA
2.	16	Ridge Vineyards Monte Bello	1971	USA
3.	15	Château Mouton-Rothschild	1970	France
3.	15	Freemark Abbey Winery	1969	USA
5.	14	Château Leoville Las Cases	1971	France
5.	14	Château Montrose	1970	France
5.	14	Stag's Leap Wine Cellars	1973	USA
8.	13	Clos Du Val Winery	1972	USA
9.	12	Château Haut-Brion	1970	France
10.	9	Mayacamas Vineyards	1971	USA

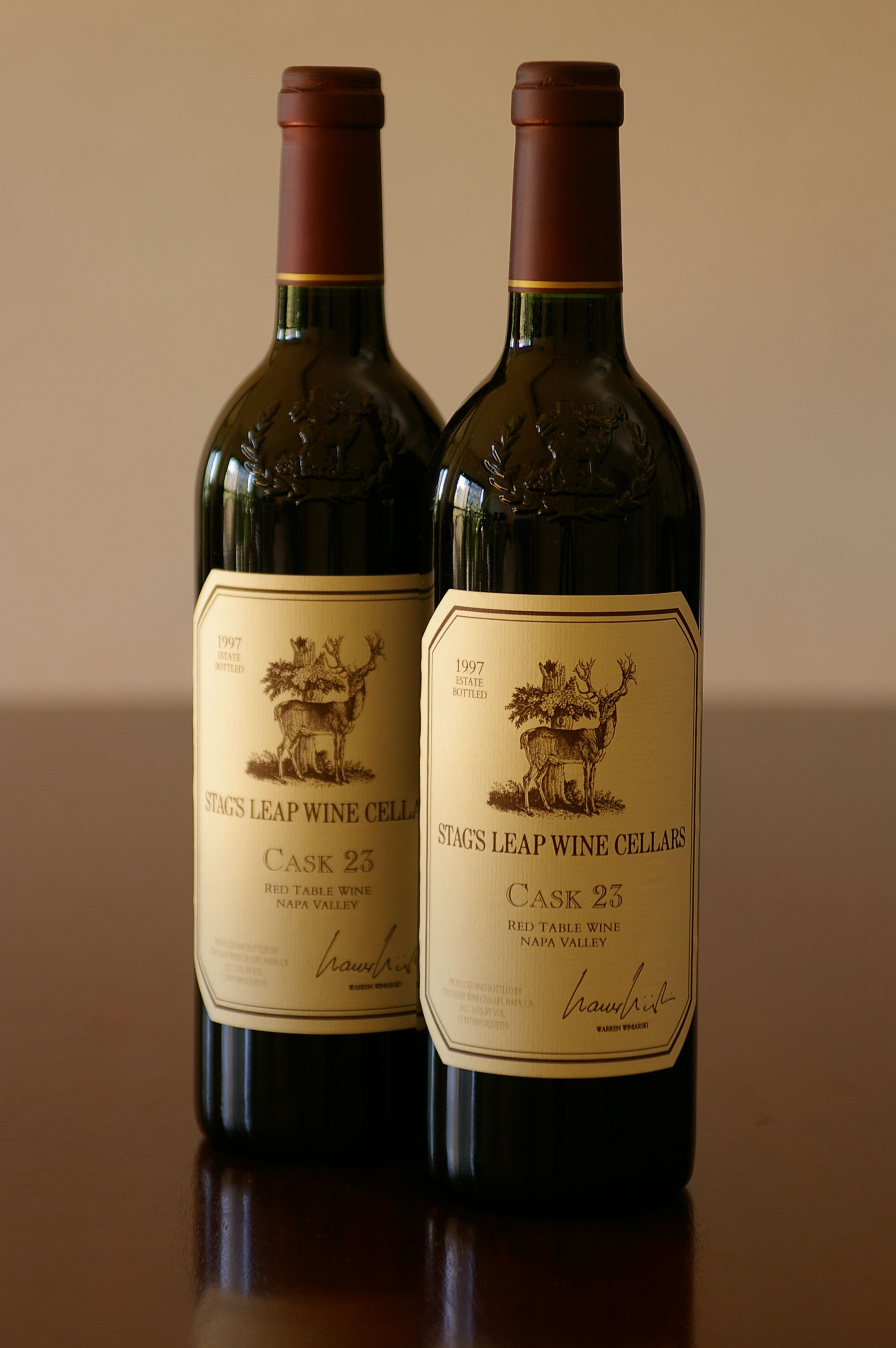
Stag's Leap Wine Cellars was judge Odette Kahn's highest ranking red wine.

Odette Kahn Original grades: out of 20 points.

Rank	Grade	Wine	Vintage	Origin
1.	15	Stag's Leap Wine Cellars	1973	USA
2.	13	Mayacamas Vineyards	1971	USA
3.	12	Château Mouton-Rothschild	1970	France
3.	12	Château Montrose	1970	France
3.	12	Château Leoville Las Cases	1971	France
3.	12	Château Haut-Brion	1970	France
7.	7	Ridge Vineyards Monte Bello	1971	USA
8.	5	Freemark Abbey Winery	1969	USA
9.	2	Heitz Wine Cellars Martha's Vineyard	1970	USA
9.	2	Clos Du Val Winery	1972	USA

Raymond Oliver Original grades: out of 20 points.

Rank	Grade	Wine	Vintage	Origin
1.	14	Château Montrose	1970	France
1.	14	Mayacamas Vineyards	1971	USA
1.	14	Stag's Leap Wine Cellars	1973	USA
4.	12	Château Mouton-Rothschild	1970	France
4.	12	Château Leoville Las Cases	1971	France
4.	12	Ridge Vineyards Monte Bello	1971	USA
7.	10	Château Haut-Brion	1970	France
7.	10	Clos Du Val Winery	1972	USA
7.	10	Heitz Wine Cellars Martha's Vineyard	1970	USA
10.	8	Freemark Abbey Winery	1969	USA

Steven Spurrier Original grades: out of 20 points.

Rank	Grade	Wine	Vintage	Origin
1.	14	Château Montrose	1970	France
1.	14	Château Mouton-Rothschild	1970	France
1.	14	Stag's Leap Wine Cellars	1973	USA
1.	14	Ridge Vineyards Monte Bello	1971	USA
5.	13	Heitz Wine Cellars Martha's Vineyard	1970	USA
5.	13	Freemark Abbey Winery	1969	USA
7.	12	Château Leoville Las Cases	1971	France
8.	11	Clos Du Val Winery	1972	USA
9.	9	Mayacamas Vineyards	1971	USA
10.	8	Château Haut-Brion	1970	France

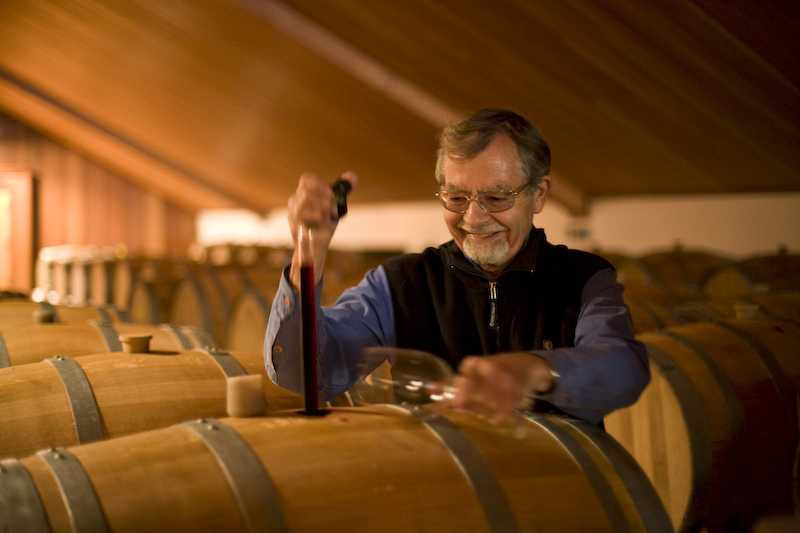
Paul Draper was the winemaker who created the Ridge Monte Bello wine that was judge Pierre Tari's highest rated red.

Pierre Tari Original grades: out of 20 points.

Rank	Grade	Wine	Vintage	Origin
1.	17	Ridge Vineyards Monte Bello	1971	USA
2.	15	Heitz Wine Cellars Martha's Vineyard	1970	USA
3.	14	Château Montrose	1970	France
3.	14	Château Haut-Brion	1970	France
3.	14	Freemark Abbey Winery	1969	USA
6.	13	Clos Du Val Winery	1972	USA
6.	13	Stag's Leap Wine Cellars	1973	USA
8.	12	Château Leoville Las Cases	1971	France
8.	12	Mayacamas Vineyards	1971	USA
10.	11	Château Mouton-Rothschild	1970	France

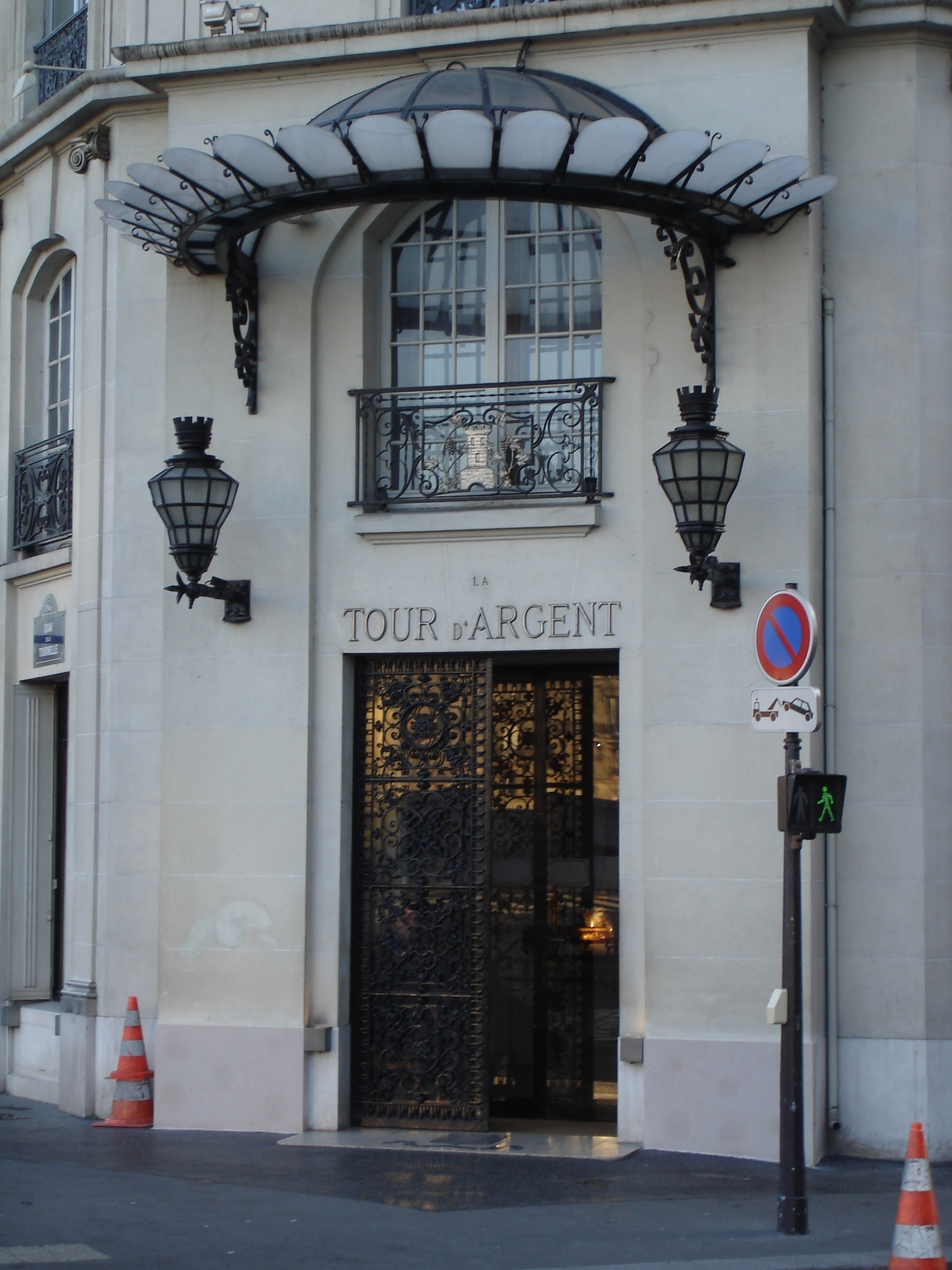
Judge Christian Vanneque was head sommelier at the Paris restaurant La Tour d'Argent when he participated in the tasting.

Christian Vanneque Original grades: out of 20 points.

Rank	Grade	Wine	Vintage	Origin
1.	17	Château Haut-Brion	1970	France
2.	16.5	Clos Du Val Winery	1972	USA
2.	16.5	Stag's Leap Wine Cellars	1973	USA
4.	16	Château Mouton-Rothschild	1970	France
5.	15.5	Ridge Vineyards Monte Bello	1971	USA
6.	11	Château Montrose	1970	France
7.	10	Heitz Wine Cellars Martha's Vineyard	1970	USA
8.	8	Château Leoville Las Cases	1971	France
9.	6	Freemark Abbey Winery	1969	USA
10.	3	Mayacamas Vineyards	1971	USA

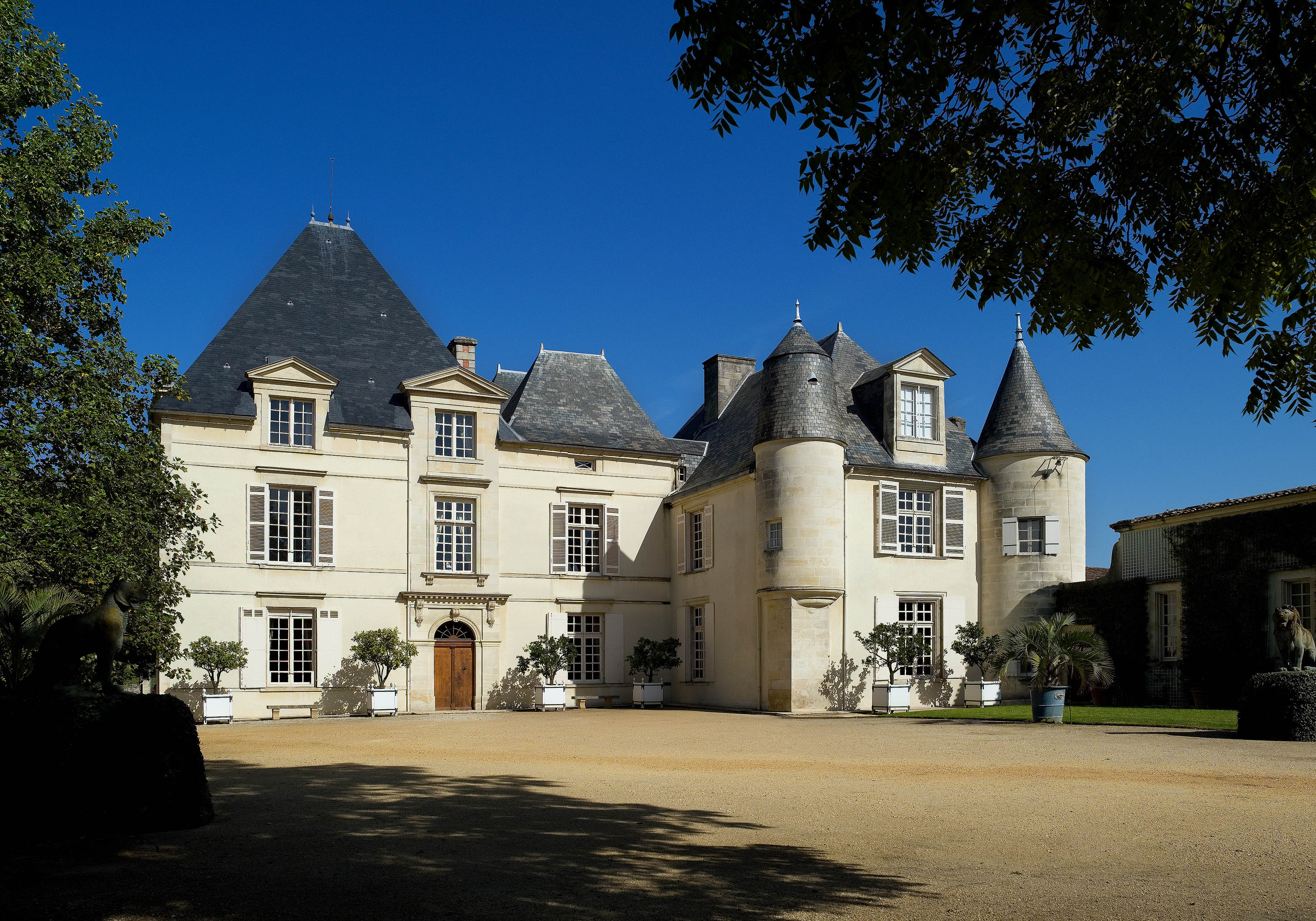
Château Haut-Brion was judge Aubert de Villaine's second highest red after Chateau Montrose.

Aubert de Villaine Original grades: out of 20 points.

Rank	Grade	Wine	Vintage	Origin
1.	16	Château Montrose	1970	France
2.	15	Château Haut-Brion	1970	France
2.	15	Stag's Leap Wine Cellars	1973	USA
4.	14	Château Mouton-Rothschild	1970	France
5.	12	Mayacamas Vineyards	1971	USA
6.	10	Château Leoville Las Cases	1971	France
7.	9	Ridge Vineyards Monte Bello	1971	USA
8.	7	Freemark Abbey Winery	1969	USA
8.	7	Heitz Wine Cellars Martha's Vineyard	1970	USA
10.	5	Clos Du Val Winery	1972	USA

Jean-Claude Vrinat Original grades: out of 20 points.

Rank	Grade	Wine	Vintage	Origin
1.	15	Château Montrose	1970	France
1.	15	Château Haut-Brion	1970	France
3.	14	Château Mouton-Rothschild	1970	France
3.	14	Stag's Leap Wine Cellars	1973	USA
5.	13	Mayacamas Vineyards	1971	USA
6.	12	Château Leoville Las Cases	1971	France
7.	11	Ridge Vineyards Monte Bello	1971	USA
8.	9	Heitz Wine Cellars Martha's Vineyard	1970	USA
9.	7	Freemark Abbey Winery	1969	USA
9.	7	Clos Du Val Winery	1972	USA

== Interpretations and replications ==
=== Statistical interpretation ===
Orley Ashenfelter and Richard E. Quandt analyzed the results of all 11 judges instead of only nine and proposed a slightly different ranking (see below). They also stated that only the scores of the first two and of the last one wines in their ranking were statistically valid, and that the seven other wines could not be differentiated statistically.

1. USA Stag's Leap Wine Cellars '73
2. France Montrose '70
3. France Mouton '70
4. France Haut Brion '70
5. USA Ridge Monte Bello '71
6. USA Heitz Martha's Vineyard '70
7. France Leoville-las-cases '71
8. USA Freemark Abbey '69
9. USA Mayacamas '71
10. USA Clos du Val '72

In a 2026 analysis, Richard Ballantyne MW identified arithmetic errors in the white wine totals published in Taber's 2005 book, finding that Château Montelena and Meursault Charmes scored identically on the official nine-judge panel, making the white flight a tie rather than a clear Californian victory. Applying ordinal ranking, Borda count and the Condorcet method to the red wine scores, Ballantyne found Château Haut-Brion to be the most consistently preferred wine on the panel, placing first on three of four aggregation methods.

=== Tasting replications ===
Some critics argued that French red wines would age better than the California reds, so this was tested.

==== San Francisco Wine Tasting of 1978 ====
The San Francisco Wine Tasting of 1978 was conducted 20 months after the Paris Wine Tasting of 1976. Steven Spurrier flew in from Paris to participate in the evaluations, which were held at the Vintners Club.

On 11 January 1978, evaluators blind-tasted the same Chardonnays tasted earlier in Paris.

1. USA – 1974 Chalone Vineyard
2. USA – 1973 Chateau Montelena
3. USA – 1973 Spring Mountain Vineyard
4. France – 1972 Puligny-Montrachet Les Pucelles Domaine Leflaive.

Ranking lower were Meursault Charmes Roulot 1973, Beaune Clos des Mouches Joseph Drouhin 1973, and Batard-Montrachet Ramonet-Prudhon 1973.

On 12 January 1978, evaluators blind-tasted the same Cabernet Sauvignons tasted earlier in Paris.

1. USA – 1973 Stag's Leap Wine Cellars
2. USA – 1970 Heitz Wine Cellars Martha's Vineyard
3. USA – 1971 Ridge Vineyards Monte Bello
4. France – 1970 Château Mouton Rothschild.

Ranking lower were Château Montrose 1970, Château Haut-Brion 1970, and Château Leoville Las Cases 1971.

==== French Culinary Institute Tasting of 1986 ====
Two tastings were conducted by the French Culinary Institute (now called the International Culinary Center) on the tenth anniversary of the original Paris Wine Tasting. White wines were not evaluated in the belief that they were past their prime.

Steven Spurrier, who organized the original 1976 wine competition, assisted in the anniversary tasting. Eight judges blind tasted nine of the ten wines evaluated. The evaluation resulted in the following ranking:

Results

1. USA – Clos Du Val Winery 1972
2. USA – Ridge Vineyards Monte Bello 1971
3. France – Château Montrose 1970
4. France – Château Leoville Las Cases 1971
5. France – Château Mouton Rothschild 1970
6. USA – Stag's Leap Wine Cellars 1973
7. USA – Heitz Wine Cellars 1970
8. USA – Mayacamas Vineyards 1971
9. France – Château Haut-Brion 1970

==== Wine Spectator Tasting of 1986 ====
Four of the judges were experts from Wine Spectator and two were outsiders. All tasted the wines blind.

Results

1. USA – Heitz Wine Cellars 1970
2. USA – Mayacamas Vineyards 1971
3. USA – Ridge Vineyards Monte Bello 1971
4. USA – Stag's Leap Wine Cellars 1973
5. USA – Clos Du Val Winery 1972
6. France – Château Montrose 1970
7. France – Château Mouton Rothschild 1970
8. France – Château Leoville Las Cases 1971
9. USA – Freemark Abbey Winery 1969
10. France – Château Haut-Brion 1970

==== 30th anniversary ====
A 30th anniversary re-tasting on both sides of the Atlantic Ocean was organized by Steven Spurrier in 2006. As The Times reported,

Despite the French tasters, many of whom had taken part in the original tasting, 'expecting the downfall' of the American vineyards, they had to admit that the harmony of the Californian cabernets had beaten them again. Judges on both continents gave top honors to a 1971 Ridge Monte Bello cabernet. Four Californian reds occupied the next placings before the highest-ranked Bordeaux, a 1970 Château Mouton-Rothschild, came in at sixth.

"The Tasting that Changed the Wine World: 'The Judgment of Paris' 30th Anniversary" was conducted on 24 May 2006.

The pearl anniversary was held simultaneously at the museum Copia in Napa, California, and in London at Berry Bros. & Rudd, Britain's oldest wine merchant.

The panel of nine wine experts at Copia consisted of Dan Berger, Anthony Dias Blue, Stephen Brook, Wilfred Jaeger, Peter Marks MW, Paul Roberts MS, Andrea Immer Robinson MS, Jean-Michel Valette MW and Christian Vannequé, an original judge from the 1976 tasting.

The panel of nine experts at Berry Bros. & Rudd consisted of Michel Bettane, Michael Broadbent MW, Michel Dovaz, Hugh Johnson, Matthew Jukes, Jane MacQuitty, Jasper Morris MW, Jancis Robinson OBE MW and Brian St. Pierre.

The results showed that additional panels of experts again preferred the California wines over their French competitors.

Results

1. USA – Ridge Vineyards Monte Bello 1971
2. USA – Stag's Leap Wine Cellars 1973
3. USA – Mayacamas Vineyards 1971 (tie)
4. USA – Heitz Wine Cellars 'Martha's Vineyard' 1970 (tie)
5. USA – Clos Du Val Winery 1972
6. France – Château Mouton-Rothschild 1970
7. France – Château Montrose 1970
8. France – Château Haut-Brion 1970
9. France – Château Leoville Las Cases 1971
10. USA – Freemark Abbey Winery 1969

Three of the Bordeaux wines in the competition were from the 1970 vintage, identified by the Conseil Interprofessionnel du Vin de Bordeaux (CIVB) as among the four best vintages in the past 45 years or more. The fourth Bordeaux was a 1971, described by the Conseil as "very good". Another official French authority, the Office national interprofessionnel des vins (Onivins), rates the 1971 vintage as "excellent".

The French wine producers had many years' experience making wine, whereas the California producers typically had only a few years' experience; the 1972 vintage was Clos Du Val's very first, yet it performed better than any of its French competitors.

==== 50th anniversary ====
In 2026, there were numerous scheduled events and articles recognizing the golden anniversary of the historic Parisian wine tasting. On 24 May 2026, the exact date of the fiftieth anniversary, wine afficionado James Suckling held a private re-creation with a group of tasters in San Francisco. A panel of ten wine professionals — Darrell Corti, Olivia Harmon, Andrey Ivanov MS, Marie Kim-Suckling, Tim Mondavi, Tegan Passalacqua, Daniel Pendleton, Tonya Pitts, James Suckling and Madeline Triffon MS — tasted two blind flights: a re-creation of the 1976 red-wine flight using the same vintages, and a separate flight of contemporary California and Bordeaux wines. Each judge ranked the wines in a flight from best to worst, and a wine's score was the sum of its ranks, with the lowest total indicating the most-preferred wine. The historic flight was scored by all ten judges; Olivia Harmon did not score the contemporary flight.
In the re-creation of the original flight, California wines took four of the top five places, led by the 1970 Heitz Wine Cellars Martha's Vineyard. The tasters reported that all of the older wines remained in good condition. In the contemporary flight the 2016 Château Haut-Brion placed first (tie-break win over the 2013 Ridge Vineyards Monte Bello). The panel generally found the modern wines more uniform in style and less distinctive than the older bottles.

Re-creation of the 1976 flight

Rank	Wine	Points	Origin
1	1970 Heitz Wine Cellars Martha's Vineyard	32	USA
2	1971 Ridge Vineyards Monte Bello	33	USA
3	1970 Château Mouton-Rothschild	41	France
4	1971 Mayacamas Vineyards	43	USA
5	1972 Clos Du Val Winery	49	USA
6	1971 Château Leoville Las Cases	54	France
7	1973 Stag's Leap Wine Cellars	57	USA
8	1970 Château Haut-Brion	68	France
9	1969 Freemark Abbey Winery	86	USA
10	1970 Château Montrose	87	France

Contemporary flight

Rank	Wine	Points	Origin
1	2016 Château Haut-Brion	44	France
2	2013 Ridge Vineyards Monte Bello	44	USA
3	2012 Dunn Howell Mountain	50	USA
4	2016 Château Palmer	50	France
5	2014 Heitz Wine Cellars Martha's Vineyard	51	USA
6	2014 Togni	53	USA
7	2016 Château Mouton-Rothschild	55	France
8	2016 Château Leoville Las Cases	57	France
9	2016 Eisele	61	USA
10	2016 Château Montrose	66	France
11	2012 Harlan Estate	80	USA
12	2015 Château Cheval Blanc	91	France

Napa's historic Freemark Abbey winery in St. Helena held their "Judgment of Napa" blind tasting event on October 5, 2026 as a tribute not only to the 50th anniversary, but also Freemark's 140 years and to the late Steven Spurrier on what would have been his 85th birthday. The event featured Patricia Gastaud-Gallagher, Spurrier’s American business partner who conceived the original tasting to showcase emerging quality in California wines; Bella Spurrier, Steven’s wife, whose impromptu photographs immortalized the event; and family members of TIME magazine reporter George Taber. Twenty of the world's most prestigious wines — spanning Burgundy, Bordeaux, Napa Valley, and beyond — took center stage with each bottle sourced from the finest producers and evaluated with exacting precision: vintage years were deliberately matched across regions to ensure a level playing field, so that terroir and craftsmanship alone determine greatness — mirroring the rigor of the 1976 tasting that changed wine history forever.

Red Wine Results

1. USA – Aperture Collage Proprietary Red, Sonoma County 2021
2. France – Château Mouton Rothschild, Pauillac, Bordeaux 2022
3. USA – TOR Beckstoffer To Kalon Vineyard Cabernet Sauvignon, Oakville 2023
4. USA – Screaming Eagle Cabernet Sauvignon, Oakville 2023
5. USA – Dominus Estate, Yountville
6. France - Château Léoville-Las Cases, Saint-Julien, Bordeaux 2022
7. France - Château Montrose, Saint-Estèphe, Bordeaux 2022
8. USA – Chappellet Pritchard Hill Cabernet Sauvignon, Napa Valley 2023
9. Chile - Viña Vik “VIK”, Millahue, Cachapoal Valley 2022
10. Italy - Tenuta San Guido "Sassicaia", Bolgheri Sassicaia, Tuscany 2023

== Implications in the wine industry ==
Although Spurrier had invited many reporters to the original 1976 tasting, the only reporter to attend was George M. Taber from Time, who promptly revealed the results to the world. The horrified and enraged leaders of the French wine industry then banned Spurrier from the nation's prestigious wine-tasting tour for a year, apparently as punishment for the damage his tasting had done to its former image of superiority. The tasting was not covered by the French press, who almost ignored the story. After nearly three months, Le Figaro published an article titled "Did the War of the Cru Take Place?", describing the results as "laughable" and saying that they "cannot be taken seriously". Six months after the tasting, Le Monde, France's most prestigious newspaper, reported the tasting where writer Lionel Raux wrote a similarly toned article titled, "Let's Not Exaggerate!"

The New York Times reported that several earlier tastings had occurred in the U.S., with American chardonnays judged ahead of their French rivals. One such tasting occurred in New York just six months before the Paris tasting, but "champions of the French wines argued that the tasters were Americans with possible bias toward American wines. What is more, they said, there was always the possibility that the Burgundies had been mistreated during the long trip from the (French) wineries." The Paris Wine Tasting of 1976 had a revolutionary impact on expanding the production and prestige of wine in the New World. It also "gave the French a valuable incentive to review traditions that were sometimes more accumulations of habit and expediency, and to reexamine convictions that were little more than myths taken on trust."

== In the media ==
- Bottle Shock, a feature film starring Alan Rickman and Chris Pine, dramatized the 1976 wine tasting and debuted at the 2008 Sundance Film Festival. A second film (Judgment of Paris, based on George Taber's book of the same name) was in production, and there has been allegations of defamation and misrepresentation between the makers of the two films.
- Modern Marvels (S:13, E:54 – "How Wine is Made".) Discussion of the event is summarized in this History Channel show.
- On September 12, 2025, in an interview between Kip Cranna (of San Francisco Opera) and Jake Heggie (the composer), Heggie said that he would be creating a one-act opera for the 2026 Festival Napa Valley celebrating the 50th anniversary of the 1976 Judgment of Paris, the United States Semiquincentennial, and 20th anniversary of the Festival. The opera premiered on July 18, 2026 at the Charles Krug Winery in St. Helena.

== See also ==
- A. W. Baxter
- Mike Grgich
- Warren Winiarski
