= Claude Dubois-Millot =

Claude Dubois-Millot was sales director of the Gault Millau restaurant guide and served as one of the eleven judges of the historic Judgment of Paris wine tasting. He was the only judge on the all-French panel that did not have previous experience in wine competition after spending the majority of his career in the automobile industry prior to joining GaultMillau in 1973. Originally his brother, the food critic Christian Millau, was slated to be on the panel but Claude served as a substitute.

== Judgment of Paris 1976 ==
During the tasting, Dubois-Millot was noted for proclaiming the Batard-Montrachet Ramonet-Prudhon as being an "obviously Californian" because it had no nose. He later admitted that such confusion did show how far in quality that Californian wines had come.
