= Domaine Leflaive =

Winery in Puligny-Montrachet, Burgundy, France

Domaine Leflaive is a winery in Puligny-Montrachet, Côte de Beaune, Burgundy. The domaine is very highly regarded for its white wines, and its vineyard holdings include 5.1 hectares (13 acres) of Grand Cru vineyards.

== History ==
The earliest roots of the domaine goes back to 1717 and a Claude Leflaive in Puligny-Montrachet. The domaine of today more directly goes back to Joseph Leflaive (1870–1953), who was a native of Puligny-Montrachet, but who had initially pursued a career as a naval engineer, having managed a factory in St Etienne and been involved in the construction of the first French submarine. In 1905, when Burgundy had not yet recovered from the effect of the phylloxera epidemic, which meant that vineyards were for sale at a very low price, Leflaive was able to buy 25 hectares (62 acres) for his domaine.

In 1920, Leflaive started a programme of replantation with better adapted root stock, and progressively started to sell wine under his own label rather than to négociants. After the death of Joseph Leflaive in 1953, the domaine was managed by Joseph's sons Vincent Leflaive and Jo Leflaive, and it was during this time that its reputation as a top Burgundy producer was built up. In 1973, the domaine was given a company structure to avoid splitting it up with subsequent inheritance. In 1990, Vincent's daughter Anne-Claude Leflaive and her cousin Olivier Leflaive took over the running of the domain. Because Olivier Leflaive was also running a négociant business, in 1994, Anne-Claude Leflaive took over the running of the domain on her own, following a decision of the various family members who collectively own the domaine. In 1997, Anne-Claude took the decision to convert the domain to biodynamic winemaking.

Domaine Leflaive and Olivier Leflaive's négociant business are completely separate entities.

== Wines ==
Domaine Leflaive produces wines from the following vineyard holdings:

- Grand Cru wine:
  - Montrachet, 0.0821 hectares (0.203 acres)
  - Chevalier-Montrachet, 1.99 hectares (4.9 acres)
  - Bâtard-Montrachet, 1.91 hectares (4.7 acres)
  - Bienvenues-Bâtard-Montrachet, 1.15 hectares (2.8 acres)
- Premier Cru wine:
  - Puligny-Montrachet Les Pucelles, Folatières, Les Combettes, Le Clavoillon
  - Meursault sous le Dos d'Âne
- Village wine:
  - Puligny-Montrachet, 7 climats totalling 4.64 hectares (11.5 acres)
- Regional wine (Bourgogne blanc), 2 parcels totalling 3.24 hectares (8.0 acres)

== Judgment of Paris and other wine competitions ==
Domaine Leflaive's Puligny-Montrachet Premier Cru wine Les Pucelles competed in the historic Judgment of Paris, ranking number eight among the ten French and California wines evaluated. It also competed in the Great Chardonnay Showdown and the Grand European Jury Wine Tasting of 1997. The small vineyard Les Pucelles is planted on well drained limestone and chalky soil. Like most white Burgundy wine it is made entirely from the Chardonnay grape.
