= Ramonet =

Ramonet may refer to:

== People with the surname ==
- Édouard Ramonet (1909–1980), French politician
- Ignacio Ramonet (born 1943), Spanish academic, journalist and writer

== Other ==
- Domaine Ramonet-Prudhon, French wine producer
