= Château Montrose =

Winery in the Bordeaux region of France

Coordinates: 45.24667°N 0.76114°W

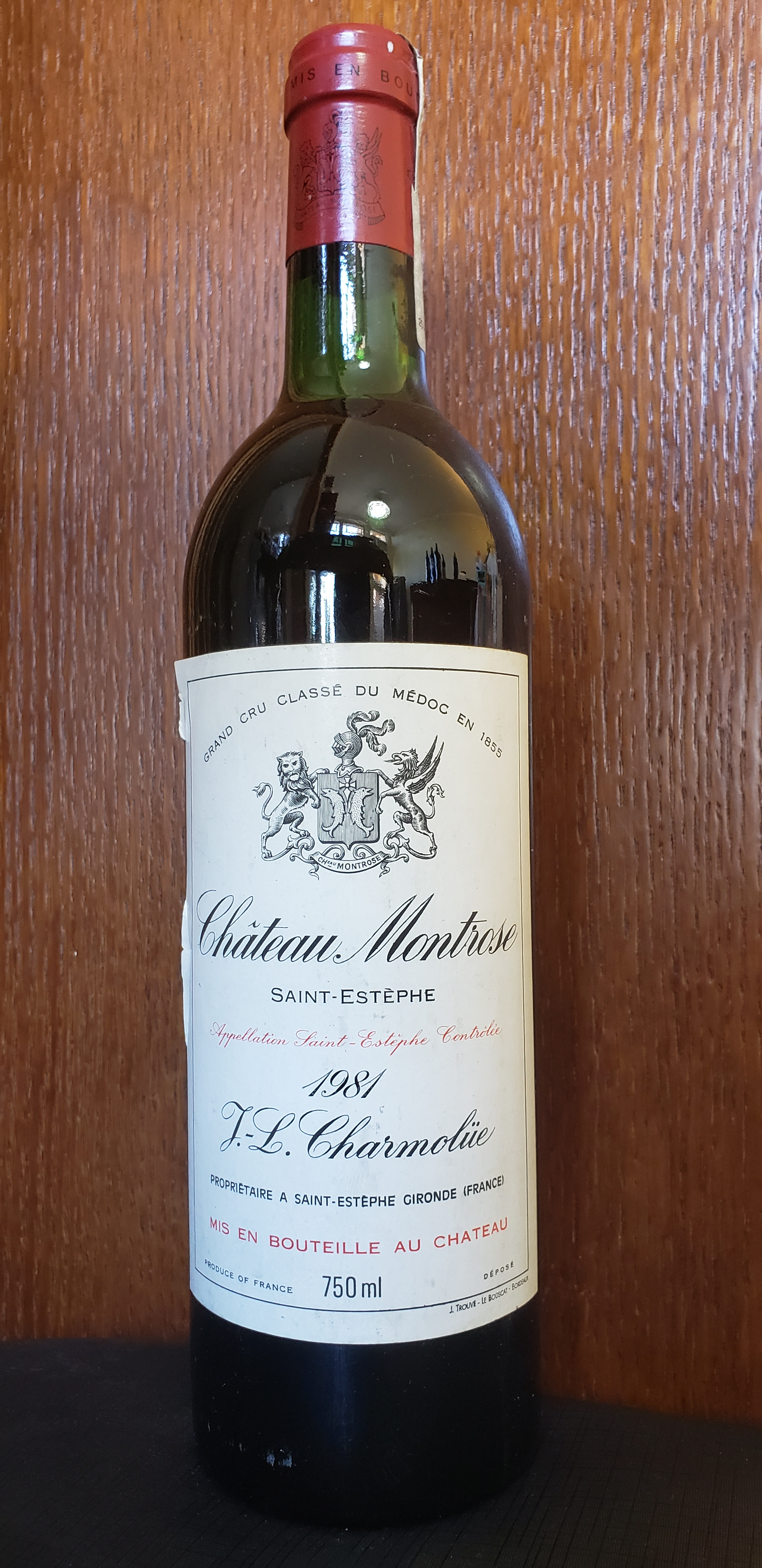
A bottle from the 1981 vintage

Château Montrose is a winery in the Saint-Estèphe appellation of the Bordeaux region of France. The wine produced here was classified as one of fifteen Deuxièmes Crus (Second Growths) in the original Bordeaux Wine Official Classification of 1855. Since 2006, Olivier and Martin Bouygues own this winery.

== Location ==
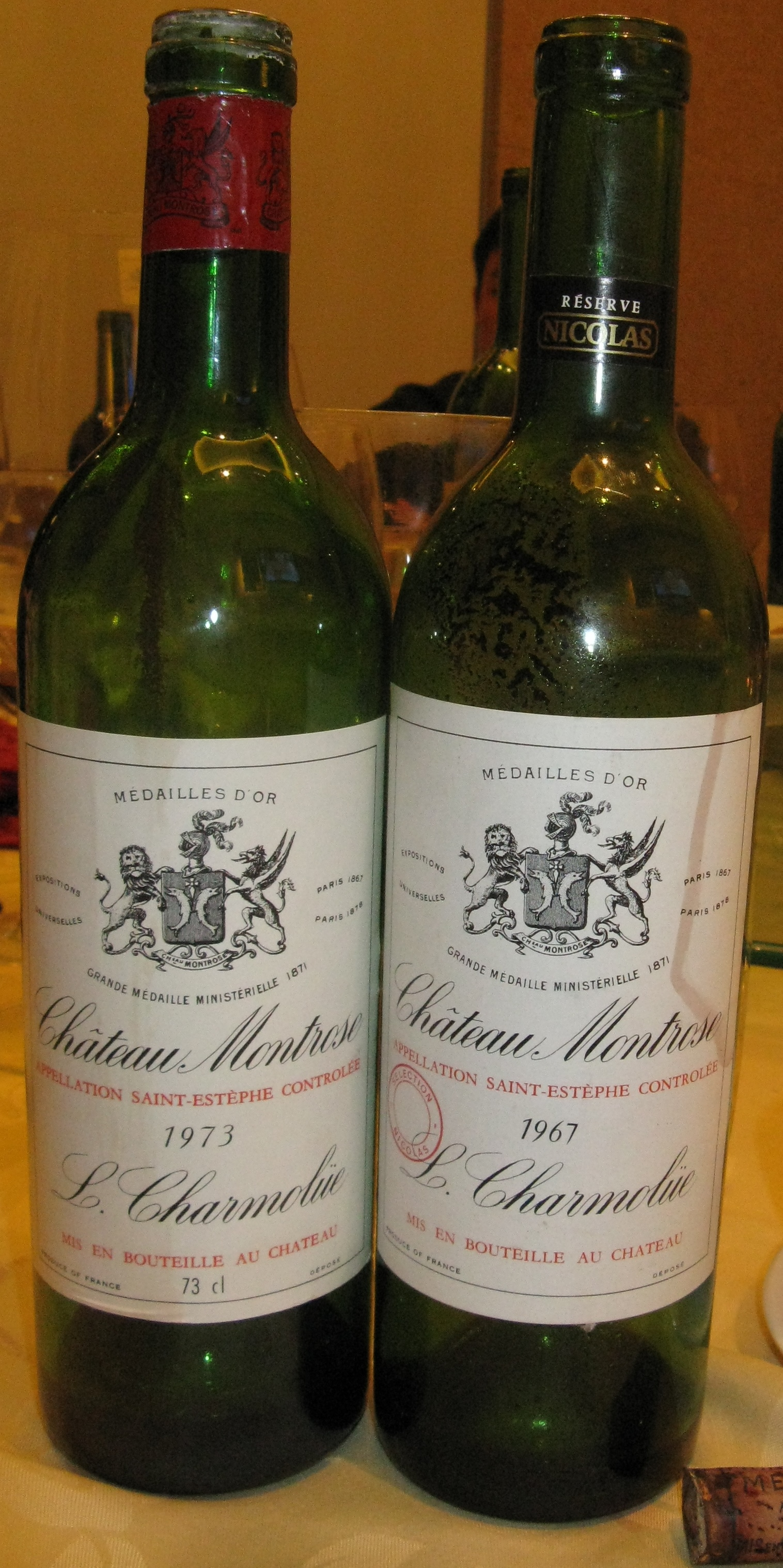
Grand vin from the 1960s and 1970s

The vineyard is in Saint-Estèphe, the easternmost of the great Médoc communes. The soil in Montrose's 168 acres (0.68 km^{2}) consists of gravel and black sand with a subsoil of clay and marl. They are planted with 65% Cabernet Sauvignon, 25% Merlot and 10% Cabernet Franc.

== The wine ==
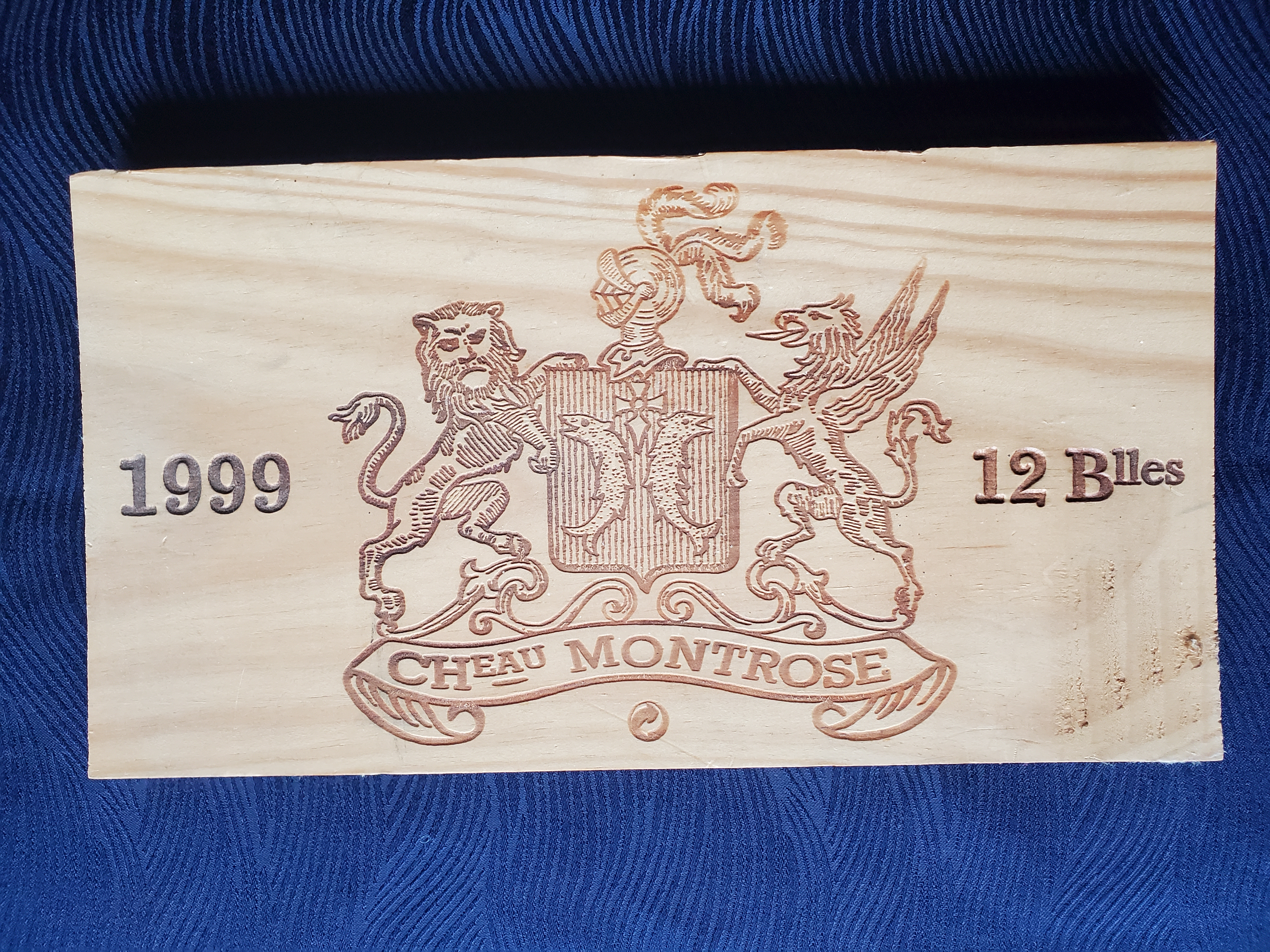
End panel from 1999 Chateau Montrose wooden case.

Château Montrose produces three red wines: its eponymous grand vin, a second wine named La Dame de Montrose and a third, more modestly priced wine named Tertio de Montrose. The 1970 vintage was placed third among the ten California and French red wines at the historic Paris Wine Tasting of 1976, which was won by the Americans.

Montrose wines tend to be deeply tannic and during excellent vintages can take up to 20 years to mature.

The 1990, 2009 and 2010 vintages were rated 100 points by Robert M. Parker, Jr.
