= Château Léoville-Las Cases =

Winery in the Bordeaux region of France

Coordinates: 45.16371°N 0.74041°W

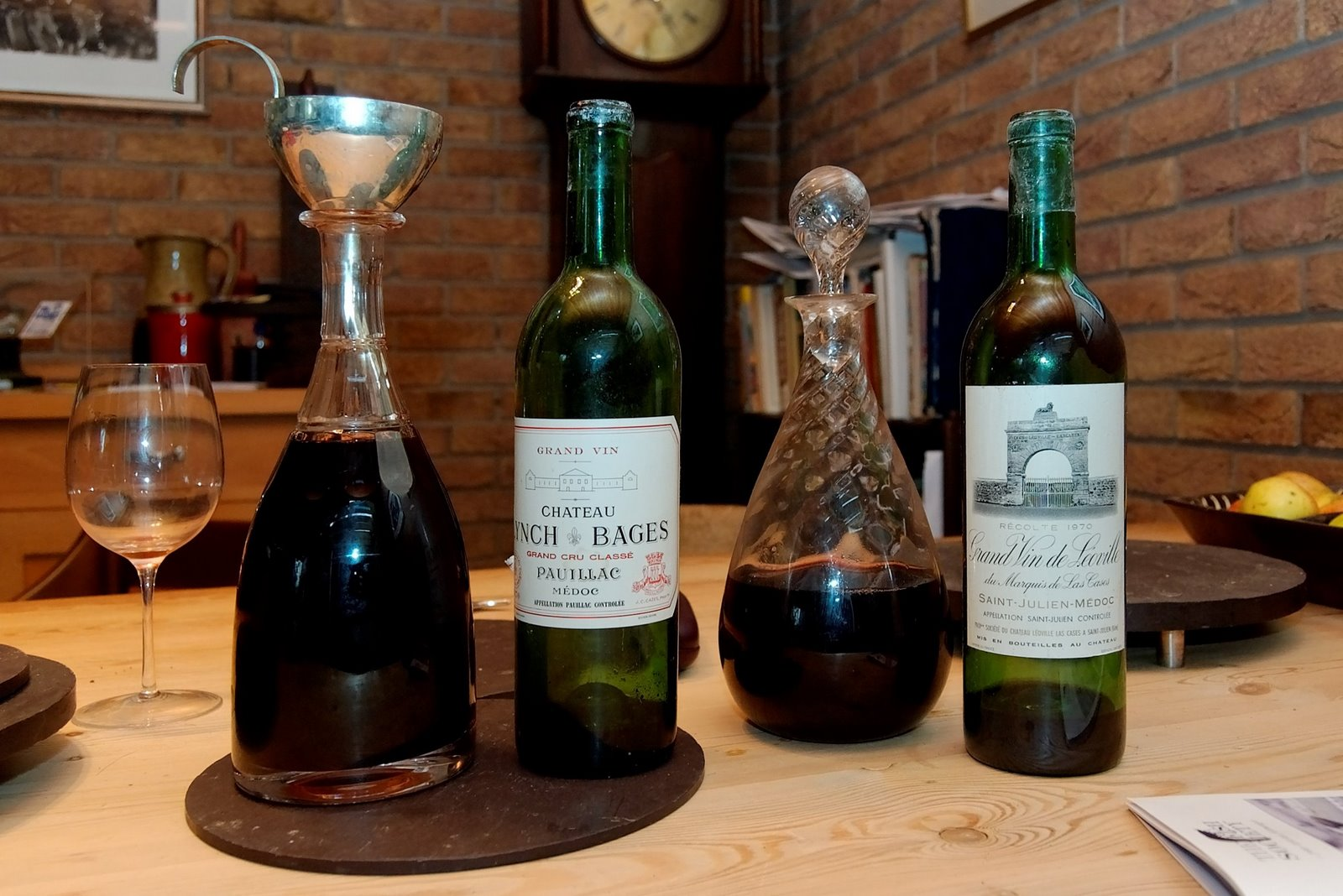
A 1970 Leoville-Las-Cases in the decanter on the right, served alongside another Bordeaux wine.

Château Léoville-Las Cases is a winery in the Saint-Julien appellation of the Bordeaux region of France. Château Léoville-Las Cases is also the name of the red wine produced by this property. The wine produced here was classified as one of fifteen Deuxièmes Crus (Second Growths) in the original Bordeaux Wine Official Classification of 1855.

Léoville-Las Cases was one of the first estates in Bordeaux to introduce a second label, Clos du Marquis. However, Clos du Marquis is a separate wine. Since 2007, the Chateau has offered a Second Wine known as Le Petit Lion de Marquis de Las Cases.

== History ==
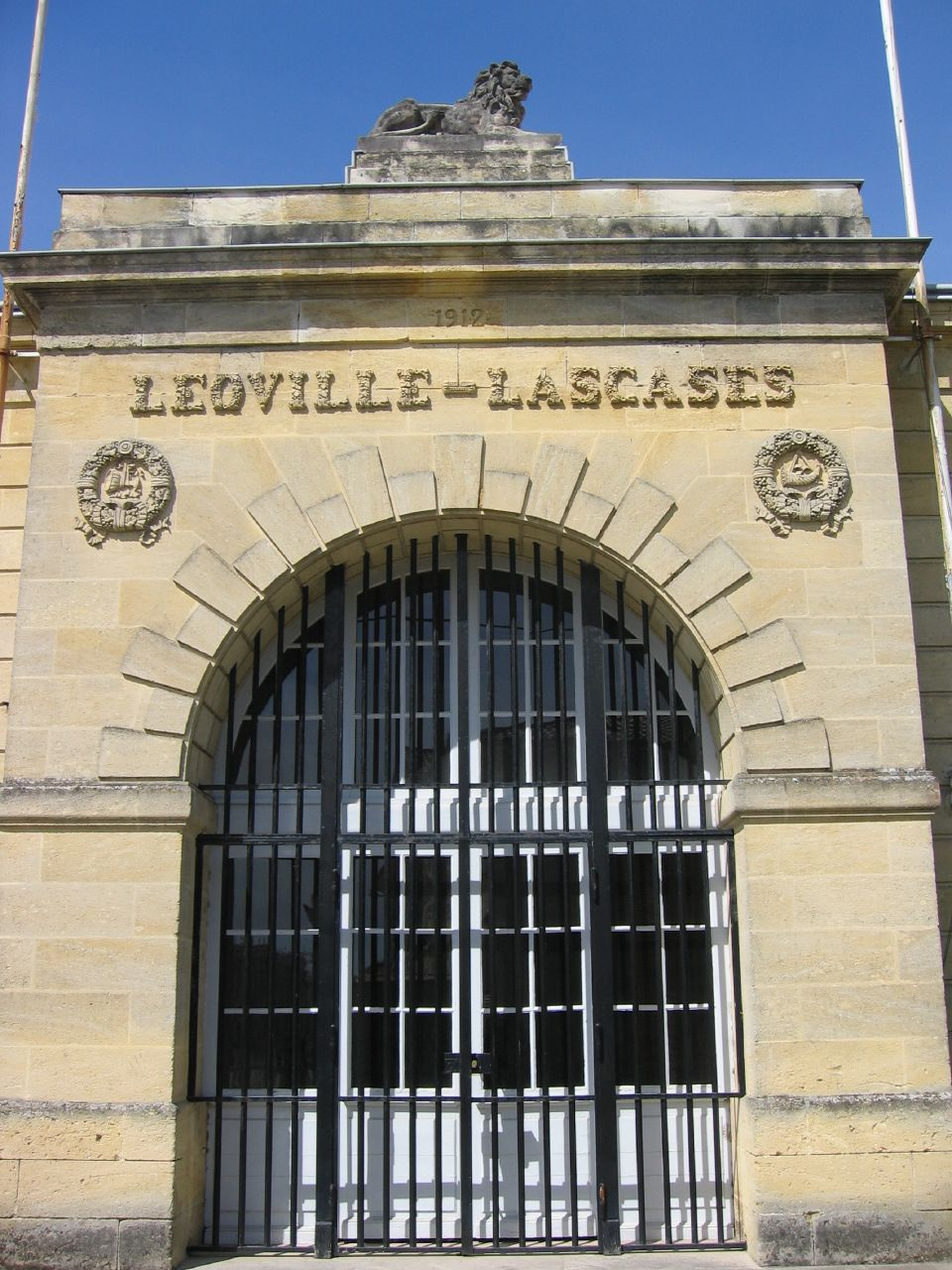
Entrance to the Chateau.

Léoville-Las Cases was once part of a much larger estate until the time of the French Revolution when a portion of this estate was separated into what is today Château Léoville-Barton. In 1840, the estate was again divided and land that would eventually become Château Léoville-Poyferré was split off.

Since the mid 20th century the Delon family have been owners of this estate, also owners of châteaux Potensac and Nénin.

In 1976, the 1971 vintage ranked number six among the ten French and California red wines in the historic "Judgment of Paris" wine competition.

== Production ==
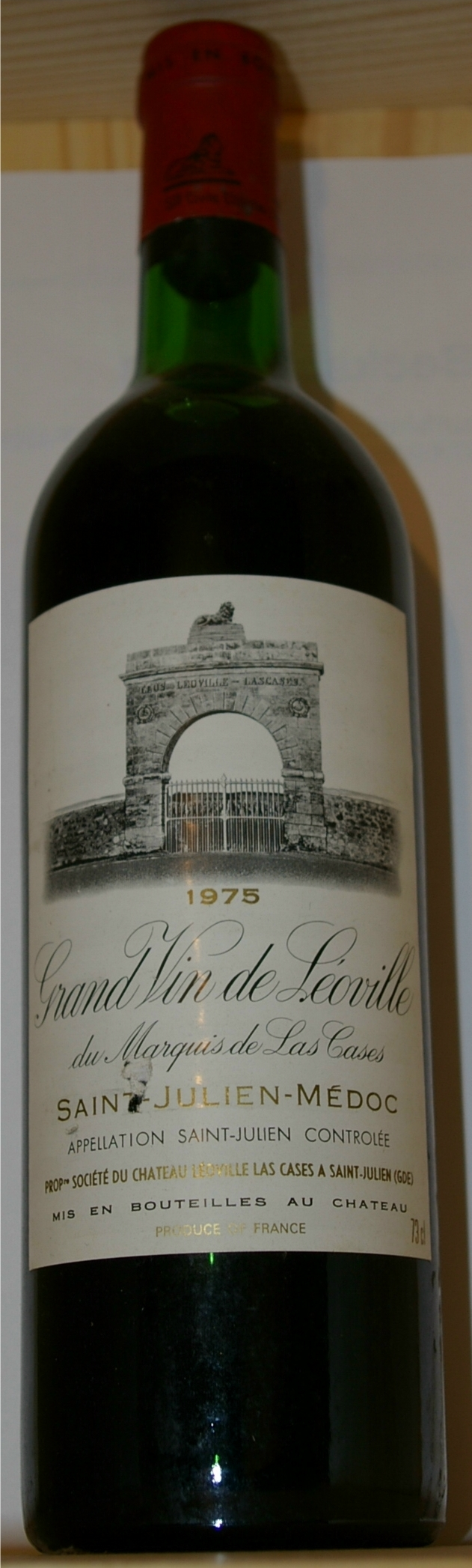
A bottle of the 1975 Château Léoville-Las Cases

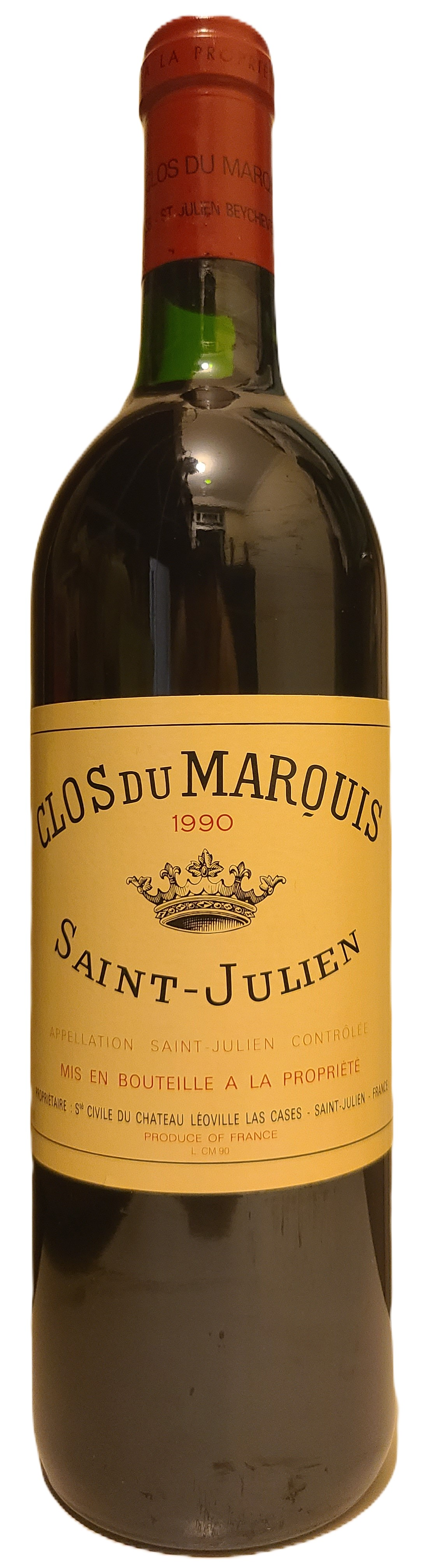
Clos du Marquis 1990

The largest plot of Léoville-Las Cases' vineyards, known as the Grand Clos, is located on the northern boundary of St-Julien, with only the Juillac tributary separating its vineyards from those of Château Latour in Pauillac.

The vineyard area in total extends 97 hectares (240 acres) planted with a grape variety distribution of 65% Cabernet Sauvignon, 19% Merlot, 13% Cabernet Franc and 3% Petit Verdot. The vineyard underwent major replanting during the 1950s, and today the vines average 30 years of age.

Léoville-Las Cases produces two wines, its grand vin, and a second wine called Clos du Marquis that has been in production since 1902.

Grapes are harvested by hand, crushed and then may be fermented in temperature controlled wood, concrete, or stainless steel vats of varying size depending on the style of the vintage. Léoville-Las Cases also employs a state of the art reverse osmosis machine to help extract excess water from the grape must in a rainy vintage. Use of this machine is considered legal, but highly controversial, and while Léoville-Las Cases is not the only estate to employ this technique, few estates admit to their use. After processing and fermentation, the wine is transferred into oak barrels for 18–20 months of aging before being fined with egg whites and bottled.

The average annual production is 180,000 to 200,000 bottles for the Grand Vin, and 250,000 to 270,000 bottles for the second label, Clos du Marquis.

== See also ==
- Emmanuel, comte de Las Cases
