= Clos Du Val Winery =

American winery

Coordinates: 38.387202°N 122.312686°W

Clos du Val Winery
- Location: Napa, California, USA
- Appellation: Stags Leap District AVA
- Founded: 1972
- First vintage: 1972
- Key people: Olav Goelet, Third-Generation Owner; Carmel Greenberg, Winemaker; Bernard Portet, Founding Winemaker
- Parent company: Goelet Wine Estates
- Known for: Stags Leap District Cabernet Sauvignon
- Varietals: Cabernet Sauvignon, Sauvignon Blanc, Cabernet Franc
- Distribution: national
- Tasting: Reservations Required
- Website: http://www.closduval.com

Clos du Val is a winery located in the Stags Leap District of Napa Valley, California. Founded in 1972, it earned global recognition in 1976 with its involvement in the famed Judgement of Paris in 1976. Clos du Val is French for “small vineyard estate of a small valley."

== History ==
Clos du Val was first recognized for its involvement in the 1976 Judgement of Paris in which it submitted its 1972 Cabernet Sauvignon. Ten years later in 1986, the same wine took first place in a rematch of the original 1976 Judgement of Paris entrants. Still family-owned today, Clos du Val farms two estate vineyards in the Stags Leap District and Yountville appellations and continues to craft wines of balance and complexity.

== Awards ==
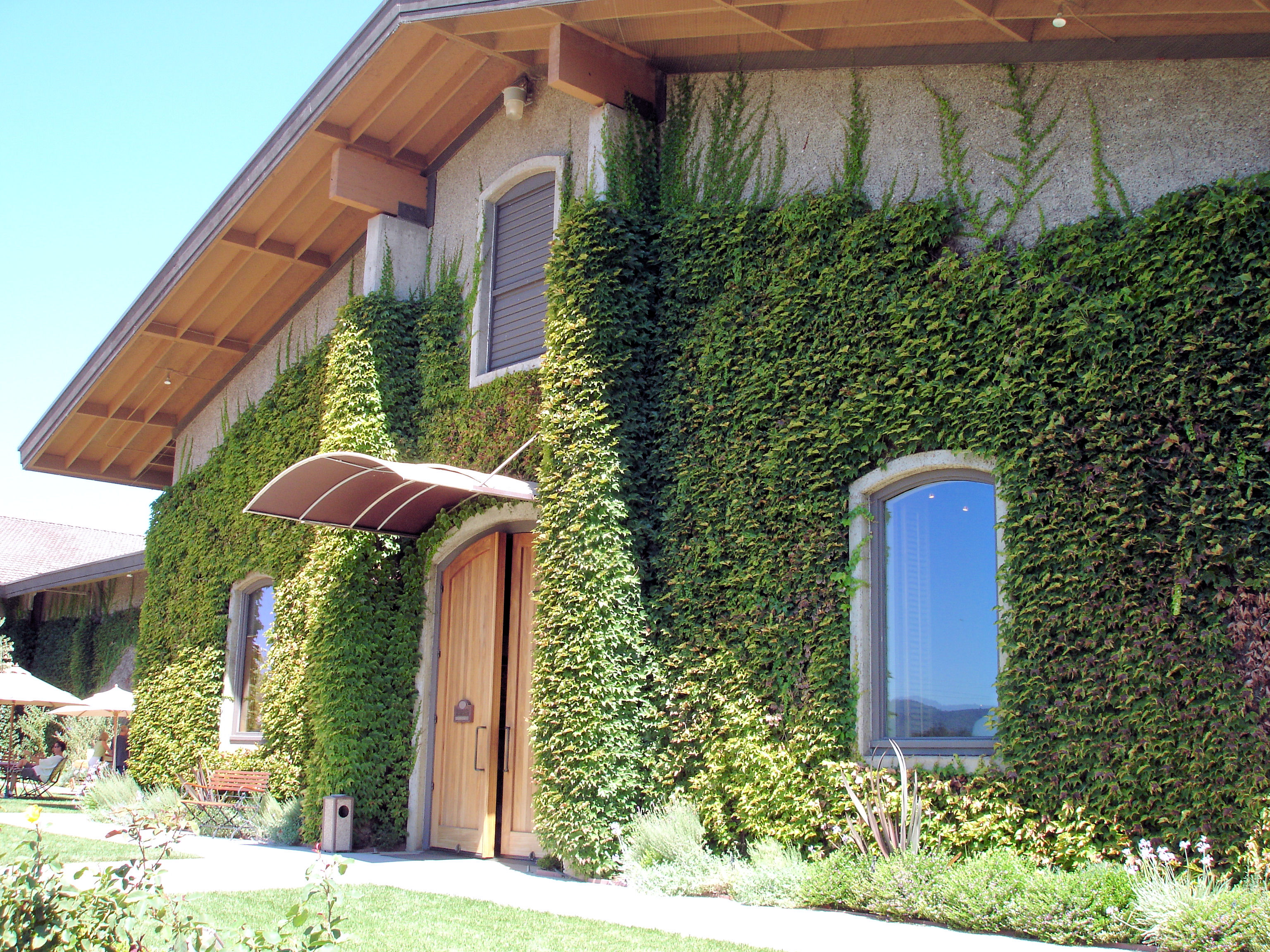
Exterior of Clos du Val Winery.

The winery received international recognition when its first vintage of Cabernet Sauvignon (1972) achieved eighth place in the Judgment of Paris.

In the French Culinary Institute Wine Tasting of 1986, Clos Du Val Winery won first place.

In The Judgment of Paris 30th Anniversary, the judges awarded Clos du Val fifth place.
