= Spring Mountain Vineyard =

Vineyard in Napa Valley, California

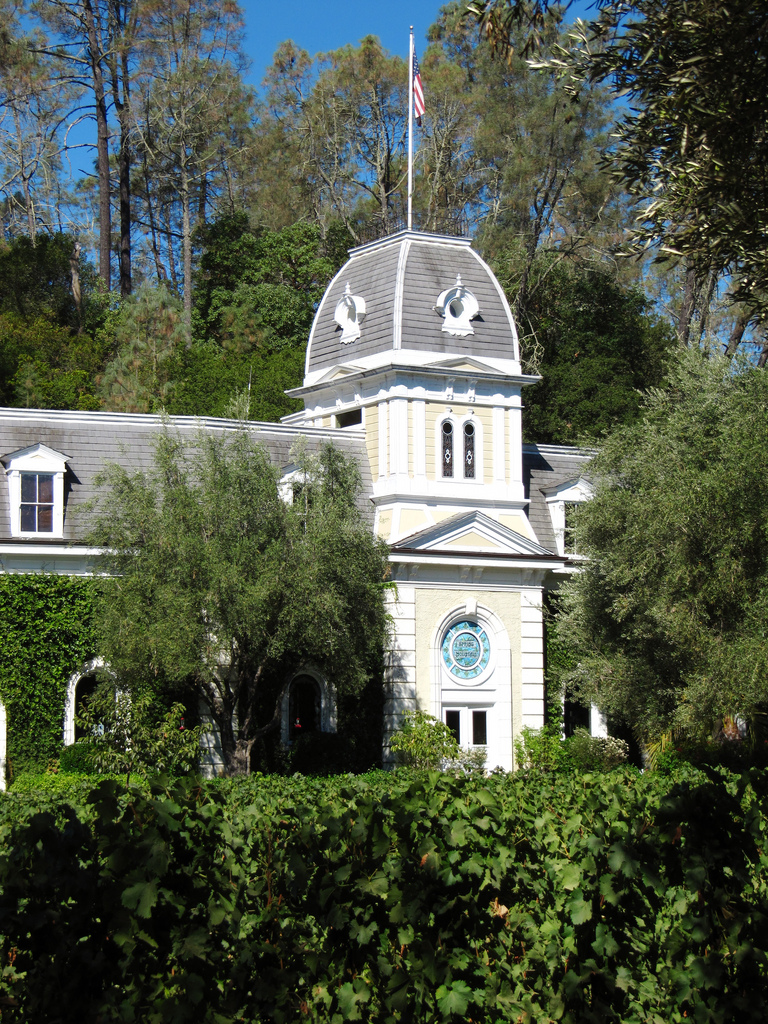
The winery at Spring Mountain Vineyard.

Spring Mountain Vineyard is a 225-acre (0.91 km^{2}) vineyard consisting of 135 different vineyard blocks scattered over the 845-acre (3.42 km^{2}) estate in California's Napa Valley. Spring Mountain Vineyard was in fourth place among French and American wines at the historic Judgment of Paris wine competition in 1976.

In 2022, the vineyard filed for Chapter 11 bankruptcy protection.

== Winery and vineyards ==
The elegant Victorian mansion, known on the estate as Miravalle, was commissioned by Mexican-American businessman Tiburcio Parrott in 1884, and designed by architect Albert Schroepfer. Schroepfer designed several other homes in similar elegant style, for example, The Rhine House at Beringer Vineyards.

The original winery and cave was also established in 1885 by Parrott. The current vineyards are on the eastern slope of Spring Mountain at elevations varying from 400 feet (120 m) to 1,700 feet (520 m).

The estate now includes four adjacent vineyards including the 435-acre (1.76 km^{2}) La Perla, 257-acre (1.04 km^{2}) Miravalle, 120-acre (0.49 km^{2}) Chevalier, and 33-acre (130,000 m^{2}) Streblow (Alba). La Perla Winery and Vineyard were originally established in 1873 by Charles Lemme. The La Perla Winery building was destroyed in the Glass Fire in 2020. This property contained the first Cabernet Sauvignon on Spring Mountain. The adjacent Chevalier and Miravelle properties were also established during the 19th century.

== Falcon Crest ==
From 1981 until 1990, Spring Mountain Vineyards became known to television viewers as the setting for the CBS drama series Falcon Crest. Cast and crew would film exterior scenes here for six weeks each summer before relocating to Los Angeles to shoot interior scenes. The mansion, winery, and many acres of surrounding vineyards, served as the fictional home of ruthless matriarch Angela Channing, played by Jane Wyman.
