= Alfred Baxter (winemaker) =

American winemaker

A.W. Baxter
- Born: 1928
- Died: March 7, 2005 (aged 76–77)
- Occupation: Winemaker
- Known for: Founder of Veedercrest Vineyards; participant in the Judgment of Paris
- Spouse: Gail Fleming

A.W. Baxter (1928 – March 7, 2005) was a Californian winemaker who founded Veedercrest Vineyards which competed in the Judgment of Paris wine tasting. The Veedercrest entrant was Baxter's first commercial vintage Chardonnay. He began buying grapes and making wine in the basement of his home in the Berkeley hills. He then acquired land on Mt. Veeder in Napa and planted a vineyard of Cabernet Sauvignon funded by selling limited partnership shares. Eventually, the wine making volume outgrew his home and at the suggestion of one of the limited partners, C. R. Nelson, he moved his winemaking to a thick walled concrete building at the by then closed Shell Shell Development Companies' Emeryville research lab. The business failed when the winery's distributor dropped prices to work off excess inventory. His wife Gail Fleming was one of the 25 people who died in the 1991 Oakland firestorm
