= Christian Vannequé =

French sommelier and restaurateur

- Born: August 20, 1949
- Died: January 9, 2015 (aged 65)
- Occupations: Sommelier, restaurateur
- Known for: Participation in the Judgment of Paris (1976), record purchase of 1811 Château d'Yquem

Christian Vannequé (20 August 1949 – 9 January 2015) was a French sommelier and restaurateur.

== Career ==
In 1967, he began at the three star Tour d'Argent restaurant in Paris as an assistant cellar man. He rose to become the restaurant's head sommelier, at 20 years old the youngest head sommelier in France. He served as an expert wine taster at the Paris Wine Tasting of 1976 (Judgment of Paris), and also participated in The Judgment of Paris 30th Anniversary.

In later years, Vannequé opened restaurants of his own in France, the United States, and Bali.

== 1811 Chateau d'Yquem purchase ==
On July 26, 2011, Vannequé set a record for the highest price paid for a bottle of white wine, purchasing a bottle of Chateau d'Yquem, vintage 1811, for £75,000 (US$123,000) from The Antique Wine Company. He purchased the dessert wine in anticipation of celebrating the 50th anniversary of his career, but he died before he could do so.
