= Anne-Claude Leflaive =

French winemaker

Anne-Claude Leflaive (17 January 1956 - 5 April 2015) was a French winemaker and pioneer in "biodynamic" viticulture.

She began running the day-to-day operations of Domaine Leflaive in 1990, assuming control from her father Vincent.

In 2006 she was named "the world's top white winemaker" by Decanter magazine and in 2014 the Institute of Masters of Wine named her "Winemaker's Winemaker".
