= Domaine Ramonet-Prudhon =

Domaine Ramonet-Prudhon is a white French Wine producer growing Chardonnay grapes in the Grand Cru vineyard of Batard-Montrachet in Burgundy. Steven Spurrier selected the Batard-Montrachet Ramonet-Prudhon 1973 for the historic Judgment of Paris wine competition, in which it was ranked seventh among ten French and California wines. The wine also competed in the Great Chardonnay Showdown held in 1980.
