= HEC Jeunes Filles =

Haut Enseignement Commercial pour les jeunes filles (HEC JF)
Established	1916
Closed	1975
Type	Business school
Location	Paris, France
Alumnae	4 500
Website	Alumni association

Haut Enseignement Commercial pour les jeunes filles, commonly known as HEC Jeunes Filles, was a French business school reserved for women. It was active from 1916 to 1975. HECJF is a state recognized degree in France. The diploma allowed graduates to teach economics and management in grammar schools and granted credits to become a chartered accountant.

== History ==
- In 1916, when Louli Sanua created the school, dedicated to young women, she selected students from among those who passed the baccalauréat (French national secondary-school diploma, required to study at university).
- In 1924, Louli Sanua sold the school to the Paris Chamber of Commerce and Industry (CCIP). The CCIP already owned the "École supérieure de commerce de Paris", ESCP, established in 1819, and the "École des Hautes études commerciales", HEC, established in 1881.
  Coeducation did not exist, neither at HEC, nor at ESCP. The Direction of HEC had refused to admit girls.
  In the same year (March 25), the decree Bérard allowed girls to pass a baccalauréat which was equivalent to that of the boys.
- In 1954, a preparatory course after the baccalauréat became compulsory to apply for the competitive examination to HECJF. Year after year, as competition strengthened, two years were more often necessary for entry to the 3-year programme at HECJF.
- In the early 1970s, the Paris Chamber of Commerce and Industry decided to introduce coeducation to all of its schools and to close HECJF.
- Since 1973, HEC Paris, ESCP, EAP, and also ESSEC (École supérieure des sciences économiques et commerciales) have been accepting women.

== Alumnae ==
=== Association of graduates ===
- The HECJF alumnae association was created in 1917, and is still established in Paris.
- In New York, the Association of graduates was also a member of AAGEF (Association des amis des grandes écoles de France - New York network of alumni associations of French Grandes Écoles)
- From 1 January 2013, the HECJF Alumnae will be full members of the HEC Paris Alumni Association.

=== Famous alumni ===
- Marie-Josèphe Baud, former President of Sandoz.
- Danielle Bousquet, former Vice-President at the National Assembly of France.
- Elisabeth Bukspan was in 1975 the first woman who was admitted into Inspection générale des finances (France)
- Édith Cresson, former Prime Minister of France.
- Monique Dagnaud, former member of the French Conseil supérieur de l'audiovisuel, Research Director at the School for Advanced Studies in the Social Sciences (EHESS).
- Marie-Hélène Feuillet, directeur général délégué Trigano.
- Luce Gendry, senior advisor at Rothshild, former Managing Partner of Rothschild & Cie Banque, served as Deputy Managing Director of Générale Occidentale and Bolloré. She has been Chairman of the Supervisory Board at Groupe IDI since January 2010. Ms. Gendry has been a Member of Supervisory Board at Groupe IDI since 29 June 1990.
- Jacqueline Grapin, an economist and an expert in European integration and transatlantic economic and strategic issues. She has written numerous articles for French, American, British, and German newspapers and magazines. Founder and Co-Chairperson of the Board of the European Institute
- Odette Kahn (1923-1982), a leading authority on wine.
- Michèle Lamarche, Managing Director at Lazard Freres & Co.
- Françoise Malrieu, Chairman of fr Société de financement de l'économie française.
- Françoise Montenay, Chairman of Chanel SAS, and former Chairman of Comité Colbert.
- Béatrice Philippe, Chairman of Fourpoints.
- Michèle Pujol (1951-1997), a feminist economist, whose academic writing and teaching have been widely influential.
- Marie-Paule Virard, former Editor in chief of the French economic magazine Enjeux-Les Échos, and co-author of economic books with Patrick Artus.

== See also ==
- HEC Paris
- École supérieure des sciences économiques et commerciales
- ESCP Business School
