= Patricia Gallagher =

Wine critic

Patricia Gastaud-Gallagher was a director at the Académie du Vin, and impetus, with Steven Spurrier, behind the 1976 Judgment of Paris wine tasting event and participated as one of its eleven judges. She was also on the Copia panel that oversaw the rematch on The Judgment of Paris 30th Anniversary. She is one of the few non-French natives to have won the distinguished Chevalier du Mérite Agricole given for distinguished service to the French wine industry. She was also academic director and director of the wine department of the famous Le Cordon Bleu. She is a co-author of the book Le Cordon Bleu Wine Essentials: Professional Secrets to Buying, Storing, Serving, and Drinking Wine.

Gastaud-Gallagher is featured in the 2022 film Judgement of Paris discussing the 1976 wine tasting.

== See also ==
- List of wine personalities
