= Pierre Brejoux =

French wine critic

Pierre Brejoux was Inspector General of the Appellation d'Origine Controlee Board, which controls the production of top French wines. he served as an expert wine taster in the Paris Wine Tasting of 1976. In the blind tasting, California wines won both the red and white wine categories. After the tasting, there were many calls for him to resign his position as Inspector General because so many people and groups were highly displeased with the results. He later revealed to George Taber that he traveled to California in 1974 and 'learned a lot - to my surprise...'. Brejoux also authored several books on French wine.

== Published works ==
- Les Vins de Loire. Dessins de Ralph Soupault., Paris, Compagnie parisienne d'éditions techniques et commerciales, s.d, 1954
- Les vins de Bourgogne. La Revue du vin de France, Paris, Société Française d'Editions Vinicoles, 1967
- Vins Loire, Paris, Société Française d'Editions Vinicoles, 1974

== See also ==
- List of wine personalities
