= Académie du Vin =

Coordinates: 48.880039°N 2.316785°E

The Académie du Vin was established in Paris in 1973 by Steven Spurrier as France's first private wine school. It is associated with the 1976 Judgement of Paris blind wine tasting which brought international recognition to California wines and viticulture in the New World.

== History ==
Spurrier had opened the Caves de la Madeleine, a wine store in 1970. In 1973, he partnered with International Herald Tribune writer Jon Winroth and Patricia Gallagher to open the school in a former locksmith shop adjacent to his store. Its original mission was to teach wine appreciation to ex-patriate British and Americans living in France with English-speaking instruction. However, when Parisians' interest grew, French-speaking courses were provided.

== Judgment of Paris ==
The Académie du Vin was an early consideration for hosting the 1976 Judgment of Paris tasting. As more interest grew in the event it was eventually deemed too small.
