= Mayacamas Vineyards =

California wine producer

Coordinates: 38.369651°N 122.420161°W

- Location: Napa, California, USA
- Appellation: Mt. Veeder AVA
- Founded: 1889
- Key people: The Jay Schottenstein Family
- Cases/yr: 5,000
- Varietals: Cabernet Sauvignon, Chardonnay, Merlot, Sauvignon Blanc
- Distribution: national
- Tasting: by appointment
- Website: www.mayacamas.com

Mayacamas Vineyards is a California wine producer located in the Mt. Veeder AVA in the Mayacamas Mountains within the Napa Valley AVA, bordering the Sonoma Valley AVA. The estate is known for producing wine of a more traditional style than the Napa trends of recent years that emphasizes power, weight, high levels of alcohol and extravagance.

== History ==
The winery was built in 1889 by John Henry Fisher, a German immigrant who went bankrupt in the early 1900s. It then fell into disuse for several years although bootleggers are said to have made wine in the old stone cellar during the early years of the Prohibition. During the late 1920s and 1930s the property was owned by the Brandlin family.

British chemist Jack Taylor and his wife Mary bought the property in 1941, and the estate received its current name.

In 1968 the winery was bought by Robert Travers and his wife Elinor. Under their direction, the aging facilities was enlarged, neighboring land purchased, and vineyard clearing, planting and replanting are an ongoing process. Elinor Travers died in 2007. The property was purchased by investor Charles Banks and his wife, Ali, in partnership with retail entrepreneur Jay Schottenstein and his son, Joey. The sale price was not disclosed.

Banks, the former president of CSI Capital Management in San Francisco, served as managing partner at Napa's Jonata and Screaming Eagle wineries before leaving in 2009 to found Terroir Capital, a winery, restaurant and hotel investment group. The Schottenstein family purchased Carmel Winery in Israel earlier this year.

The estate was featured as a location in the 1995 film A Walk in the Clouds portraying Napa Valley of the 1940s.

=== Paris tasting ===
The winery received international recognition after its Cabernet Sauvignon was selected for competition in the 1976 "Judgment of Paris" wine competition. Robert Travers had agreed to sell three bottles of the still unreleased 1971 vintage for the event, although he did not consider it ready to drink.

In the Wine Spectator Wine Tasting of 1986, blind tasters evaluated how the Cabernet Sauvignon wines had aged ten years after the Paris event. The 1971 Mayacamas Vineyards was ranked ninth.

On the 30th anniversary of the Paris event, two panels of expert wine tasters tasted all the original red entries to assess how the wines had aged. Mayacamas Vineyards tied for third place (with Heitz Wine Cellars) in the field of ten.

== Production ==
Cultivating Chardonnay, Cabernet Sauvignon grapes, and small blocks of Sauvignon blanc, Pinot noir, Merlot and Cabernet Franc, the vineyard area extends 53 acres (21 ha).

The winery produces approximately a total of 5,000 cases of wine per year. On average there is produced 2,000 cases of Cabernet Sauvignon and 2,000 cases of Chardonnay. There is also produced approximately 60 cases of Sauvignon blanc as well as a few hundred cases of Merlot.
