= Madeline Triffon =

American wine specialist and sommelier

Madeline Triffon is an American wine specialist and sommelier. Upon her completion of the Master Sommelier test in 1987, she was the ninth American, the first American woman, and overall only the second woman in the world to pass. She has been nicknamed "Detroit's First Lady of Wine." In 2012, she was named IntoWine.com's 90th most influential person in the United States wine industry.

== Personal life and education ==
Madeline Triffon was born in New Haven, Connecticut. When she was three years old, her family relocated to Greece. Triffon worked in the food industry to work her way through college. She sought to attend medical school. She graduated, in 1977, from the University of Michigan. She lives in Southgate, Michigan.

== Career ==
After graduation, Triffon worked for Westin Hotels & Resorts. Upon the opening of La Fontaine, a new French restaurant at the Renaissance Center in Detroit, Michigan, Triffon was named sommelier. She would become wine buyer for Westin. In 1985, leadership at Westin sent her to participate in the National Sommelier Competition. She became the sommelier at London Chop House in Detroit in 1985. She took the Master Sommeliers test in 1987 and passed the test the first time she took it. At that time, she was one of nine Americans, the first American woman, and the second woman in the world to pass. The wine list she developed for the London Chop House was awarded the Wine Spectator Grand Award. In 1988, she became the wine director of chef Jimmy Schmidt's restaurants. In 1995, Triffon became the Director of Wine and Beverages for Unique Restaurant Corporation (URC). As Director, she maintained the wine and cocktail lists for the company's restaurants. She also planned special events revolving around wine. Three of the URC restaurants wine lists were given Awards of Excellence from Wine Spectator in 1999. She became the wine director for Trowbridge Restaurant Group and left the company in the summer of 2011.

In September 2011, Triffon became master sommelier of the Plum Market chain. She serves on the board for the United States chapter of the Court of Master Sommeliers.

== Awards ==
- 1999, Wine and Spirits Professional of the Year, iSanté
- 2012, Top 100 Most Influential People in the U.S. Wine Industry, IntoWine.com
