= Steven Spurrier (wine merchant) =

British wine expert (1941–2021)

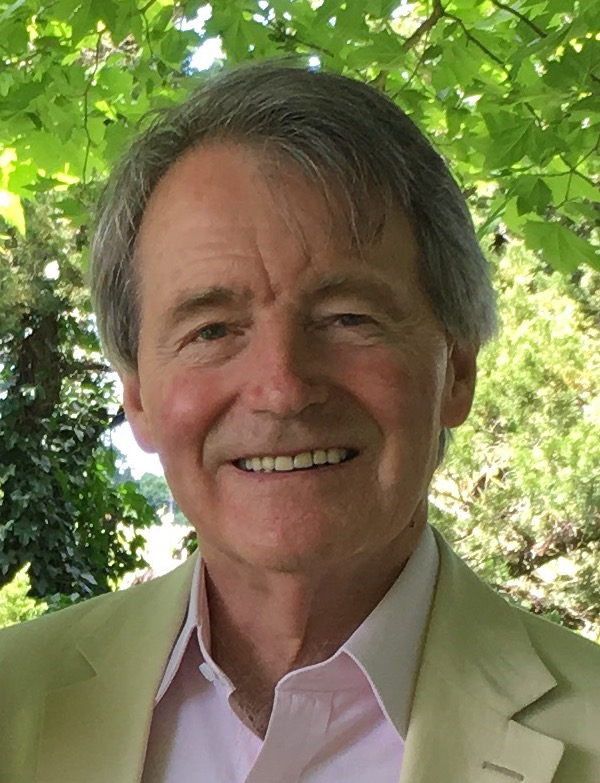
- May 2016
- Born: 5 October 1941; Cambridge, England
- Died: 9 March 2021 (aged 79); Litton Cheney, Dorset, England
- Education: Rugby School; London School of Economics
- Occupations: Wine merchant; author
- Years active: 1964–2021
- Known for: Organising the Judgment of Paris wine competition
- Spouse: Bella Lawson (m. 1968)
- Children: 2

Steven Spurrier (5 October 1941 – 9 March 2021) was a British wine expert and merchant who was described as a champion of French wine. Spurrier organised the Paris Wine Tasting of 1976, which unexpectedly elevated the status of California wine and promoted the expansion of wine production in the New World. He was the founder of the Academie du Vin and Christie's Wine Course, in addition to authoring and co-authoring several wine books.

== Early life ==
Spurrier was born in Cambridge on 5 October 1941 to John and Pamela Spurrier. His father joined his family's sand-and-gravel business in Derbyshire after the Second World War. Spurrier was educated at Rugby School, before studying at the London School of Economics. His interest in wine was first piqued after drinking 1908 Cockburn's Port when he was 13 years old.

== Career ==
Spurrier entered the wine trade in 1964 as a trainee with London's oldest wine merchant Christopher and Co. In 1970 he moved to Paris where he persuaded an elderly lady to sell him her small wine store, in the Cité Berryer, a passageway off the rue Royale, From 1971 he ran the wine shop, Les Caves de la Madeleine where clients were encouraged to taste wines before they bought them, which achieved recognition as a highly regarded specialist wine shop.

With partners Jon Winroth and Patricia Gallagher in 1973 he started L’Academie du Vin, France's first private wine school, which was central to the wine education of several wine personalities such as French wine writer Michel Bettane, and Charles F. Shaw, namesake of "Two Buck Chuck".

Spurrier went on to stage the influential "Judgment of Paris" Tasting of 1976, when a Chardonnay and Cabernet Sauvignon from California were ranked above some of the most prestigious wines of Burgundy and Bordeaux.

Spurrier sold his wine interests in France and returned to the UK in 1988, becoming a wine consultant and journalist. He was director of The Christie’s Wine Course, which he founded with Christie's Education in 1982. He was also a wine consultant to Singapore Airlines, and consultant editor to Decanter. In 2018, he starred in the documentary SOMM 3 alongside Jancis Robinson where he discussed the Judgement of Paris while tasting some of the world's finest wines. In 2019, he founded the Academie du Vin Library with Simon McMurtrie to publish wine writing. The Library published the latest edition of his memoir in 2020.

== Awards ==
Spurrier received several international awards for wine writing including Le Prix de Champagne Lanson and the Bunch Prize, both for articles published in Decanter. In 2001 he was awarded Le Grand Prix de l’Academie Internationale du Vin and The Maestro Award in honor of Andre Tchelistcheff. In 1988 he was made Le Personalite de l’Annee (Oenology) for his services to French wine. He has also received the Ritz Carlton Millennia Singapore Lifetime Achievement Award and the Prix Louis Marinier. He was a regular judge on the international wine tasting circuit and the chairman of the Japan Wine Challenge and the Decanter World Wine Awards.

== Portrayal ==
Alan Rickman portrayed Steven Spurrier in the 2008 film Bottle Shock. During its production, Spurrier warned of taking legal action in the event of misrepresentation. Having read the script, Spurrier stated, "There is hardly a word that is true in the script and many, many pure inventions as far as I am concerned".

== Personal life ==
Spurrier was married to the former Bella Lawson from 1968 until his death. Together, they had two children: Christian and Kate.

Spurrier died from cancer on 9 March 2021, at his home in the Bride Valley English Wine Estate, in Litton Cheney, Dorset. He was 79.

== Bibliography ==
- The Academie du Vin Concise Guide to French Country Wines (1984) ISBN 978-0-399-50829-5
- How to Buy Fine Wines (1986) ISBN 9780714880129
- Academie du Vin Wine Course (1991) with Michel Dovaz ISBN 978-0-02-613262-6
- Clarke & Spurrier's Fine Wine Guide (1998) with Oz Clarke ISBN 978-0-15-100412-6
- Wine—A Way of Life (2018) ISBN 978-0-95-623878-8
- Steven Spurrier: A Life in Wine (2020) ISBN 978-1-913141-07-3

== See also ==
- List of wine personalities
