= Great Chardonnay Showdown =

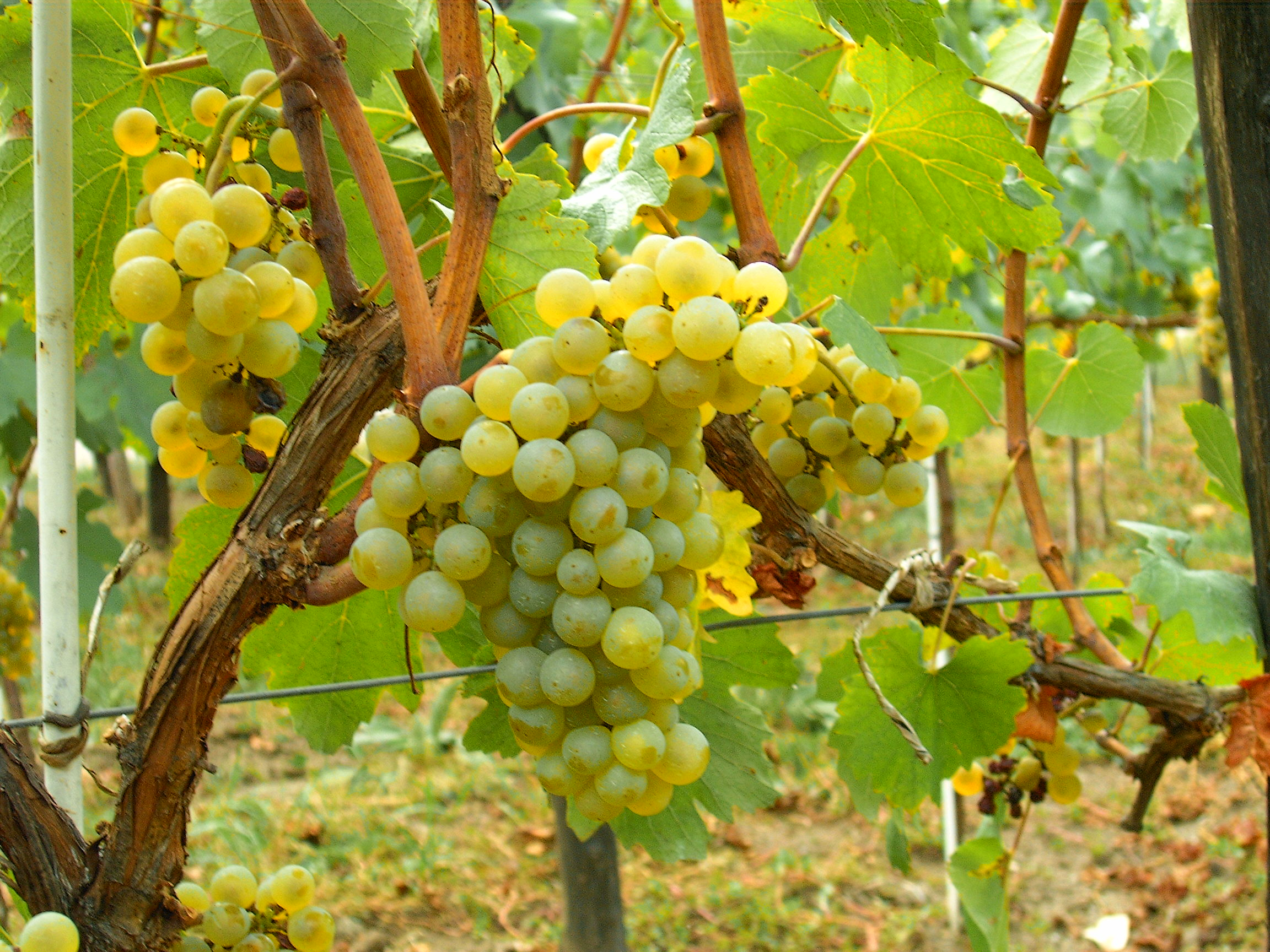
Chardonnay grapes.

The Great Chardonnay Shootout, held in the spring of 1980, was organized by Craig Goldwyn, the wine columnist for the Chicago Tribune and the founder of the Beverage Testing Institute, with help from three Chicago wine stores. A total of 221 Chardonnays from around the world were selected for the blind wine competition. France and California were heavily represented, but entries from many countries around the world were included.

== Competition ==
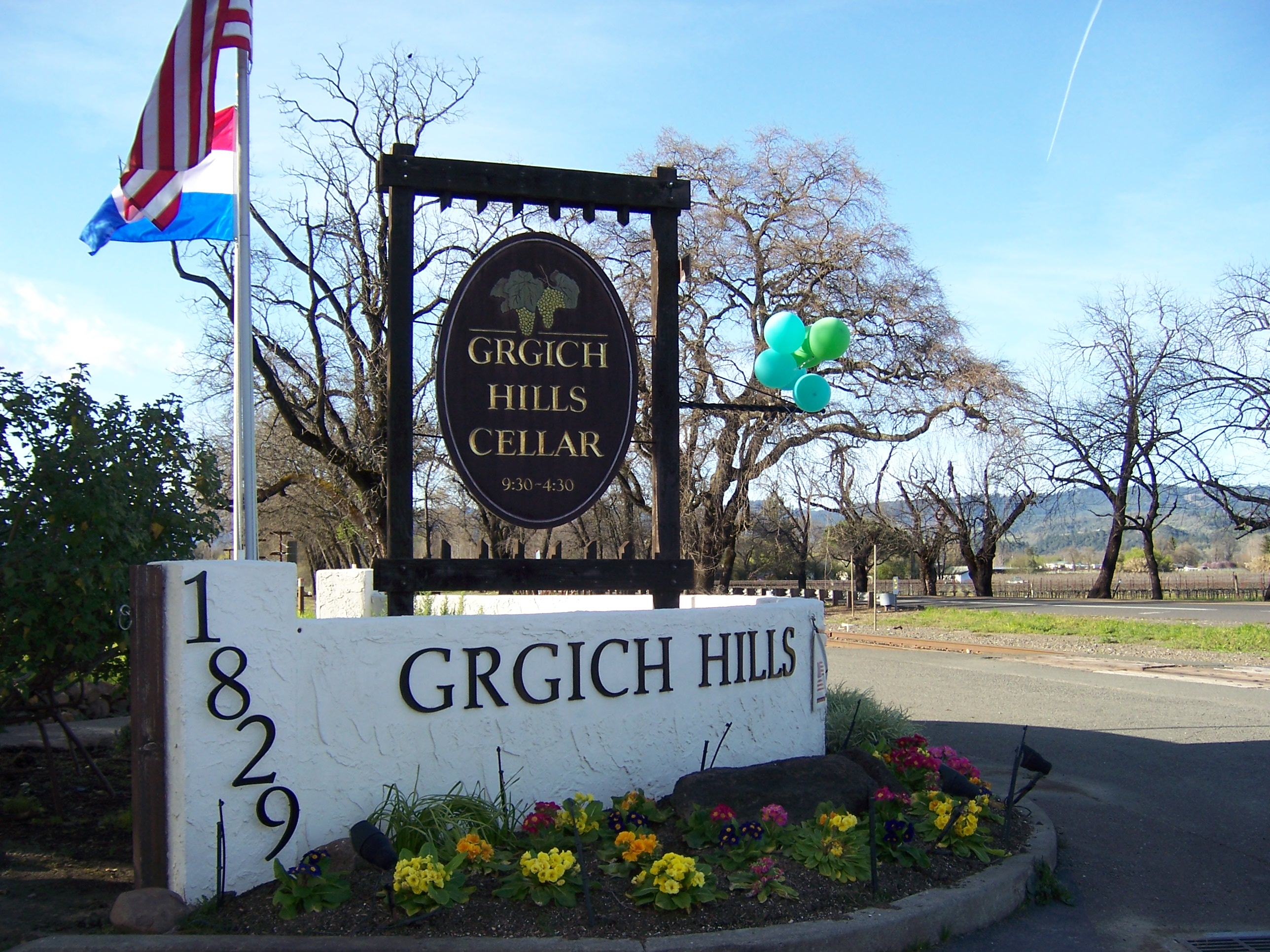
Entrance to the winning winery, Grgich Hills of California.

Five panels of five judges each first selected 19 finalists. Then ten of the original judges reviewed the finalists a second time. The winning wine was the Grgich Hills Wine Cellar Sonoma County Chardonnay 1977, which was the new winery's very first vintage. The winemaker was Mike Grgich, who had earlier made the Chateau Montelena Chardonnay that won first place among white wines at the historic Judgment of Paris wine competition.

== See also ==
- Globalization of wine
- California wine
- Grand European Jury Wine Tasting of 1997
