= Michel Bettane =

French wine critic

Michel Bettane is a leading French wine critic and, for twenty years, a writer for the French consumer wine publication La Revue du vin de France. He left La Revue in 2004 to work for the rivaling wine publication Le Classement des Meilleurs Vins de France. He now runs his own website called Tastingbook.

Following the acquisition of La Revue du vin de France by Marie-Claire and media group Lagardère, Bettane and his colleague Thierry Desseauve left the publication on grounds of editorial differences, and the two launched their own series of wine guides, Le Classement des Meilleurs Vins de France. Bettane also appears in publications such as Le Monde, Decanter and The World of Fine Wine.

Bettane is credited with coining the term vin de garage and its winemakers garagistes.

In an interview with Swiss newspaper Le Temps Bettane stated that wine critics are "not gurus", and stated that criticisms by Jonathan Nossiter in his book Le Goût et le Pouvoir were "infantile".

== See also ==
- French wine
- List of wine personalities
