= La Revue du vin de France =

French wine magazine

- Cover of issue 686
- Rédacteur en chef: Denis Saverot
- Categories: Wine magazines
- Frequency: Monthly
- Publisher: Groupe Marie Claire
- Founded: 1927
- Country: France
- Language: French
- Website: www.larvf.com

La Revue du vin de France is a French magazine on wine published monthly. The publication has been described by wine critic Jancis Robinson as "France's only serious wine magazine".

Following the magazine's acquisition by Groupe Marie Claire in 2004, long-affiliated wine critics Michel Bettane and Thierry Desseauve left the publication citing reasons of editorial differences.

Its editor Denis Saverot accused the French government of contempt for French culture, after a Paris court ruled that a Le Parisien article on Champagne was considered advertising subject to the Evin law, regulating alcohol and tobacco advertising.
