= List of wine professionals =

Sections are arranged from cultivation through processing, starting from vineyards to consumption advised by sommeliers.

== Vineyard owners ==
Included are owners of well-known or sizable vineyards. Excluded are managers (CEOs) of public holding companies as owners and persons owning vineyards as a hobby, being notable for other reasons.

Many vineyard owners are also winemakers as well.

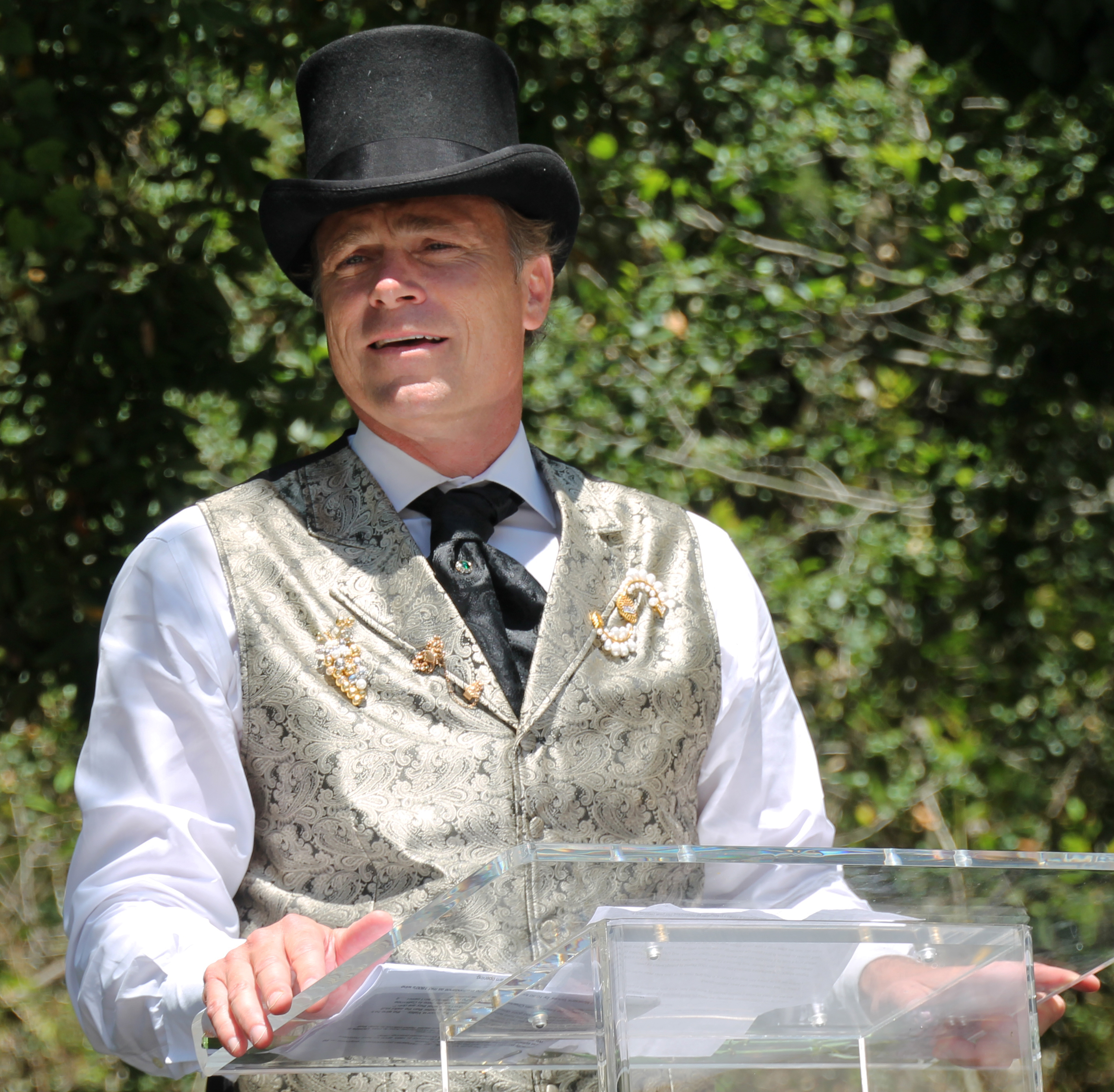
Jean-Charles Boisset

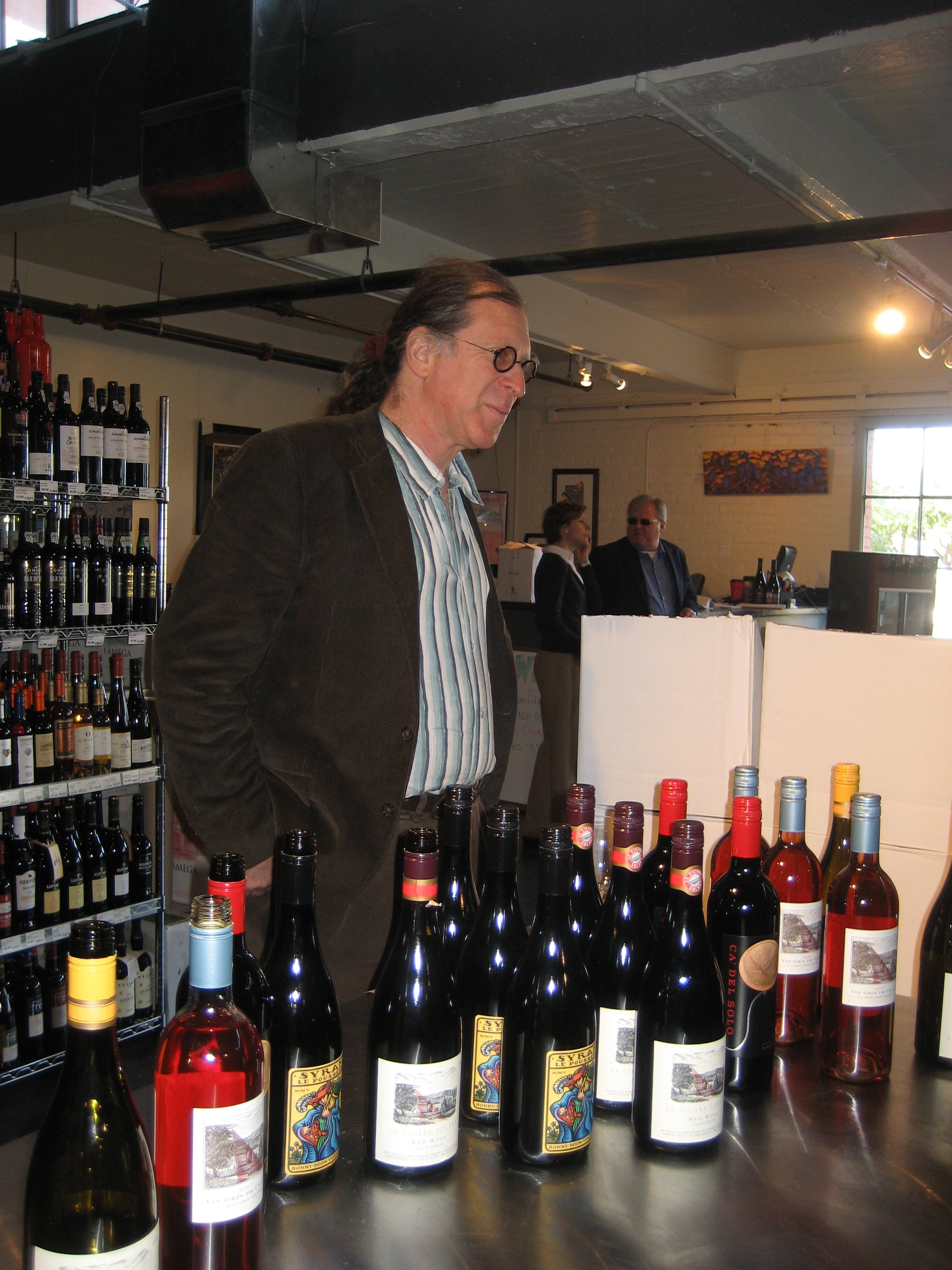
Californian winemaker Randall Grahm of Bonny Doon Vineyards

- Jean-Charles Boisset – head of Boisset Family Estates, Burgundy's largest wine producer
- Jean-Michel Cazes – Managed estates such as Château Lynch-Bages and Château Les Ormes-de-Pez
- Cecil O. De Loach, Jr. – Sonoma County grape grower and winemaker
- Franco Biondi Santi – Winemaker whose family invented Brunello di Montalcino
- Paul Champoux – Washington wine grower
- Marie-Thérèse Chappaz – Swiss organic wine grower
- Noemi Marone Cinzano – Italian businesswoman, and wine grower
- Francesco Marone Cinzano – Italian businessman, and vineyard owner
- Ernest Gallo – largest American wine producer
- Richard Graff – pioneer California winemaker
- Randall Grahm – original Rhone Ranger, owner and winemaker Bonny Doon Vineyard
- Mike Grgich – winemaker of the Chateau Montelena wine that won the white wine competition, the "Judgment of Paris"
- Agoston Haraszthy – Father of Modern Winemaking in California, see Sonoma Valley AVA
- Sir James Hardy – Australian winemaker, businessman and Olympic Games sailor; member of the Hardy's winemaking family.
- Donald M. Hess – Swiss vintner in different countries and founder of the Hess Collection (Contemporary art)
- Jean Hugel – Alsatian wine producer
- Jess Jackson – American wine producer
- Henri Jayer – French vintner, credited with introducing important innovations to Burgundian winemaking
- Kathryn Kennedy – one of the first women to own a California winery
- Charles Krug – founded the first commercial winery in the Napa Valley
- Baron Pierre Le Roy – co-founder of the Institut National des Appellations d'Origine (INAO) and owner of Château Fortia
- May-Eliane de Lencquesaing – owner of Château Pichon Longueville Comtesse de Lalande; Bordeaux wine ambassador
- Alexis Lichine – wine writer and château-owner
- Zelma Long – oenologist and pioneer of women winemaking in California
- Ernst Loosen – renowned German winemaker
- David Lowe – Australian winemaker; owner of Lowe Wines; past President of NSW Wine Industry Association; Vice President of Australian Winemakers Federation
- Alberico Boncompagni Ludovisi – late Italian prince and winemaker of Fiorano
- Giorgio Lungarotti – Italian agricultural entrepreneur and viticulturalist, founder of Cantine Lungarotti Winery
- André Lurton – instrumental in creating Pessac-Léognan as a separate appellation of Graves
- Bernard Magrez – French and global wine estate tycoon
- Thierry Manoncourt – French winemaker and owner of Château Figeac
- Henri Martin – French mayor of Saint-Julien, owner of Château Gloria and Château Saint-Pierre
- Margrit Mondavi – organizer of cultural events at vineyards in the Napa Valley (founder of Copia (museum))
- Robert Mondavi – a leading California vineyard owner; pioneered technical improvements and labeling and marketing wines varietally
- Bill Moularadellis – owner, winemaker and managing director of Kingston Estate wines
- Christian Moueix – French president of Établissements Jean-Pierre Moueix and winemaker
- Egon Müller – producer of fine Saar-Riesling
- Gustave Niebaum – founder of Inglenook Winery
- John Patchett – first person to plant a commercial vineyard in the Napa Valley
- Michel Rolland – oenologist and winery consultant
- Nathaniel de Rothschild – founder of the French wine-making branch of the Rothschild family
- Philippe de Rothschild – member of the Rothschild family
- Miguel A. Torres – pioneering Catalan winemaker and President of family wine company Bodegas Torres
- Bob Trinchero – inventor of White Zinfandel
- Aubert de Villaine – French wine expert and co-owner of the Domaine de la Romanee-Conti
- Robert G. Wilmers – owner of Château Haut-Bailly, Crus Classé de Graves in Pessac Léognan, Bordeaux
- Warren Winiarski – winemaker of the Stag's Leap Wine Cellars wine that won the Cabernet Sauvignon competition at the Paris Wine Tasting of 1976

== Viticulturists ==
Cultivation and harvesting of grapes.

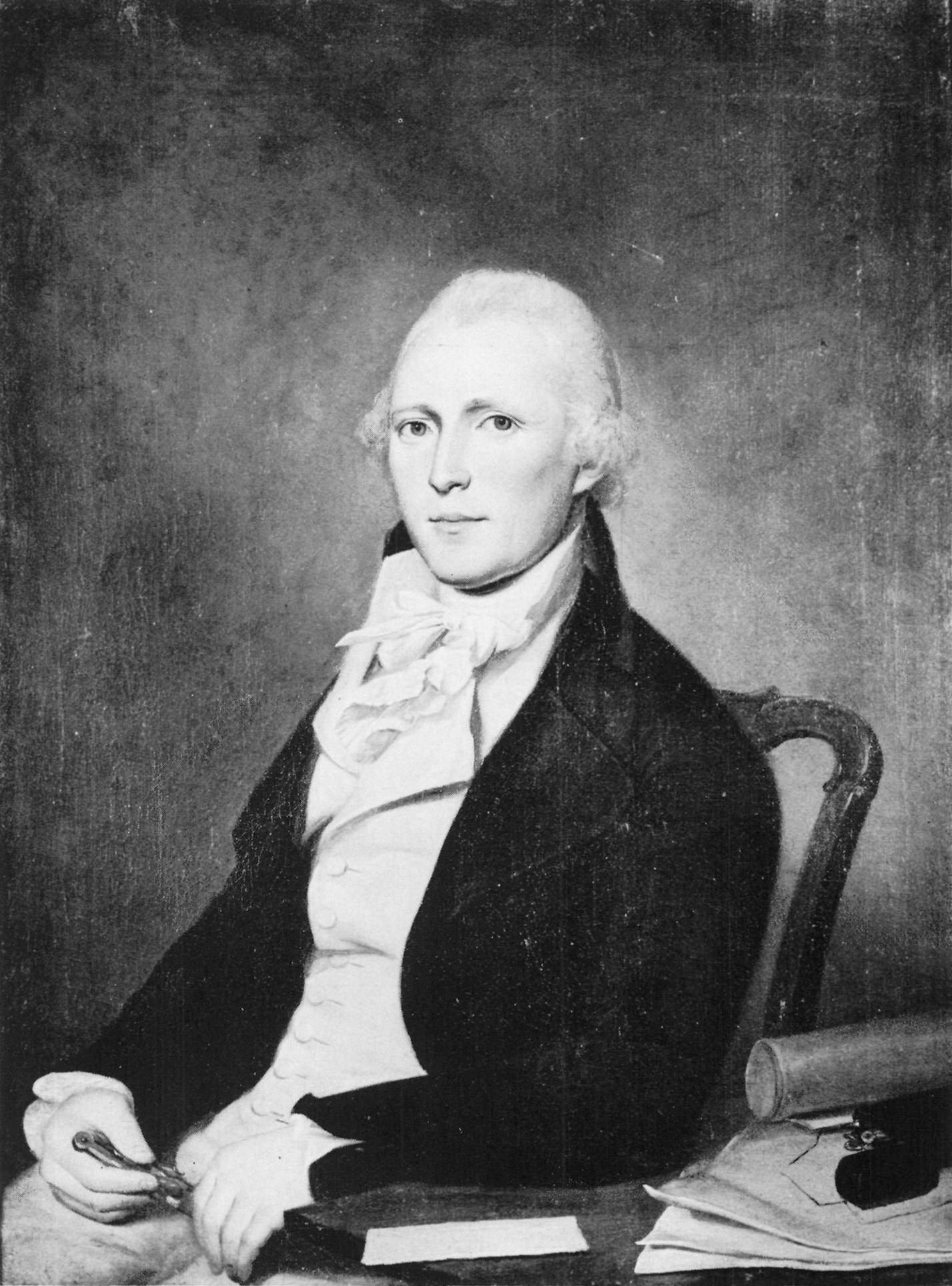
John Adlum

- John Adlum – father of American viticulture
- Helmut Becker – German viticulturist
- Andy Beckstoffer – California viticulturist
- Romeo Bragato – New Zealand wine pioneer
- James Busby – widely regarded as the "father" of the Australian wine industry
- Jules Chauvet – French chemist, considered the "father" of French natural winemaking
- Henri Enjalbert – French professor of geography and specialist in wine geology
- Konstantin Frank – "father" of vinifera wine growing in the Eastern United States
- Pierre Galet – French ampelographer and author
- Hermann Jaeger – Swiss-American viticulturist, created over 100 new grape varieties, notable hybrid was Jaeger 70
- Carole Meredith – geneticist who discovered the parentage of Cabernet Sauvignon - Chardonnay, Syrah and Zinfandel
- Thomas Volney Munson - American horticulturist and Texan grape grower who developed phylloxera-resistant rootstocks. Named Chevalier du Mérite Agricole by the French government.
- Hermann Müller (Thurgau) – Swiss oenologist, developed the Müller-Thurgau grape variety
- Abraham Izak Perold – developed the Pinotage grape variety
- Oscar Renteria – Californian viticulturalist
- Albert Seibel – French hybridist (1844–1936) who made "Seibel grapes", which are hybrids of Vitis vinifera and Vitis riparia
- Dr. Richard Smart – Australian viticulturalist who pioneered canopy management techniques for vineyards to maximize quality grapes.
- Gil Wahlquist – Australian pioneer organic winemaker

== Oenologists ==
The science and study of wine and winemaking.

- Alberto Antonini – Italian oenologist and winery consultant
- Walter Clore – "father of Washington wine"
- Jean-Luc Colombo – Rhone Valley oenologist and winemaker*
- Denis Dubourdieu – winemaker, professor of oenology at the University of Bordeaux
- Max Léglise – French oenologist
- Ann C. Noble – inventor of the Aroma Wheel
- Dom Perignon – Benedictine monk incorrectly credited with the invention of Champagne
- Émile Peynaud – renowned French oenologist
- Jacques Puisais – French oenologist and taste philosopher

== Winemakers ==
- Kristen Barnhisel – California winemaker
- Heidi Peterson Barrett – winemaker of California cult wines, called by Robert Parker "the first lady of wine"
- A. W. Baxter – winemaker of Veedercrest Vineyards, which competed in the "Judgement of Paris"
- Ntsiki Biyela – first black female winemaker in South Africa
- Tiquette Bramlett – first black woman to lead a winery in the United States
- Cathy Corison – winemaker and consultant
- Didier Dagueneau – Loire winemaker of Sauvignon blanc cult wine
- Barbe-Nicole Ponsardin-Cliquot – Champagne and namesake of Veuve Cliquot
- Stéphane Derenoncourt – French winemaker and winery consultant
- Paul Draper – winemaker of Ridge Vineyards
- Peter Gago – Australian winemaker and writer
- Mia Klein – California winemaker
- Robin and Andréa McBride – African American winemakers and founders of McBride Sisters Wine Company
- Justin Meyer – monk and winemaker at Christian Brothers
- Maurice O'Shea – Australian pioneer winemaker
- Eben Sadie – South African winemaker of the Sadie Family
- Max Schubert – leading winemaker and creator of Penfolds Grange
- Carol Shelton – California wine producer and pioneer
- Kay Simon – Washington wine producer and pioneer
- Lane Tanner – California winemaker
- André Tchelistcheff – "Dean of American Winemakers"
- Sean Thackrey – American experimental winemaker
- József Törley – founder of József Törley & Co., Hungary's most successful sparkling wine producer
- Helen Turley – California winemaker and consultant

== Wine merchants ==
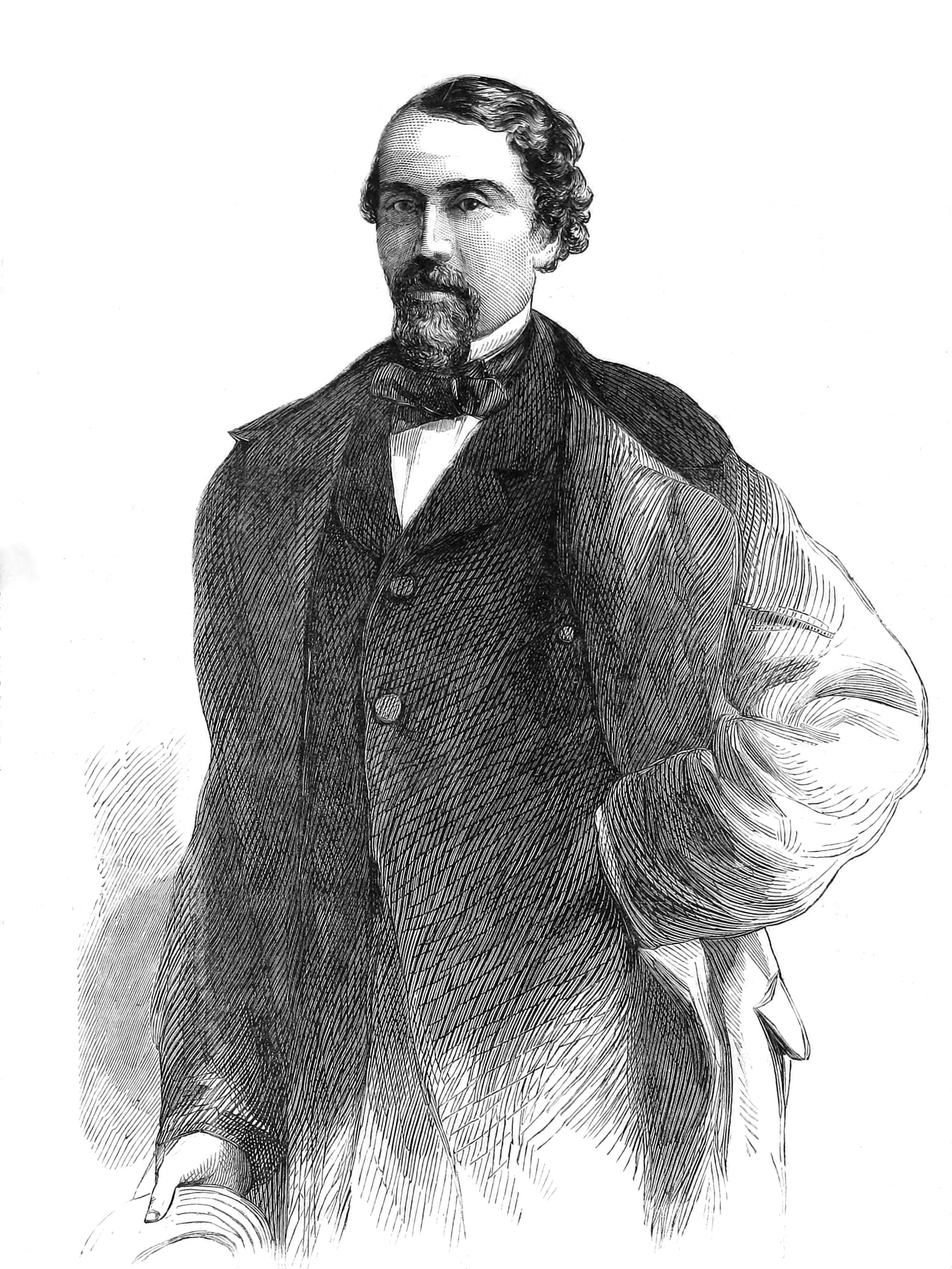
Charles Heidsieck, notable Champagne maker known as "Champagne Charlie"

- Lalou Bize-Leroy – Burgundian wine producer and former co-manager of Domaine de la Romanée-Conti
- Louis Bohne – famous sales agent of Veuve Clicquot
- Pierre Castel, French wine industry leader
- Christian Delpeuch – wine official and Plan Bordeaux promoter
- Georges Duboeuf – innovative and large Beaujolais bottler
- Charles Heidsieck – Champagne house founder
- Claude Moët – Champagne house founder
- Jean-Rémy Moët – Champagne merchant
- René Renou – French wine industry leader
- Hardy Rodenstock – wine collector and alleged wine fraud, subject of The Billionaire's Vinegar
- Jean-Claude Rouzaud – Champagne executive
- André Simon – wine merchant, gourmet, and wine writer
- Steven Spurrier – British wine authority, organized the Paris Wine Tasting of 1976

== Wine critics ==
Included are wine professionals at an elevated level compared with Wine writers, being authorities on wine tasting, having established rating systems or written reference works.

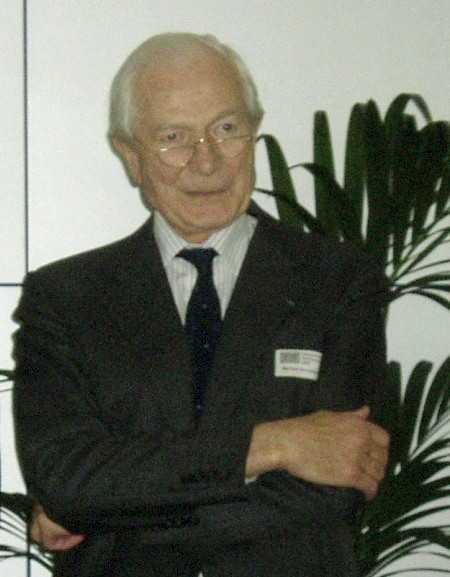
Michael Broadbent, British wine critic, author and auctioneer

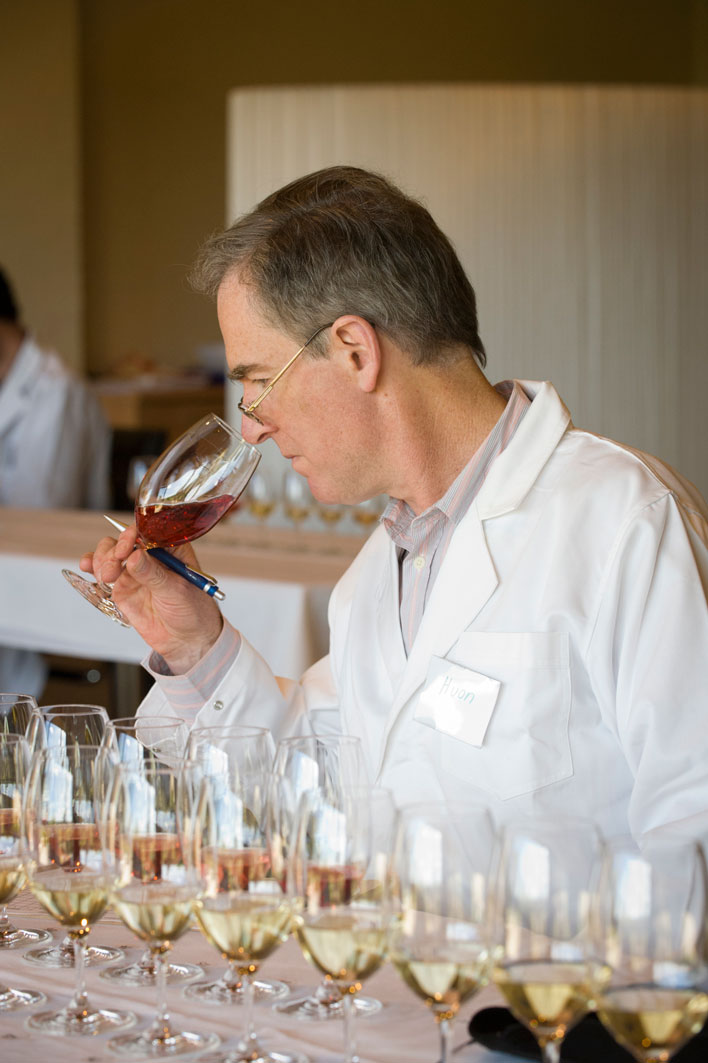
Huon Hooke at Geelong wine show

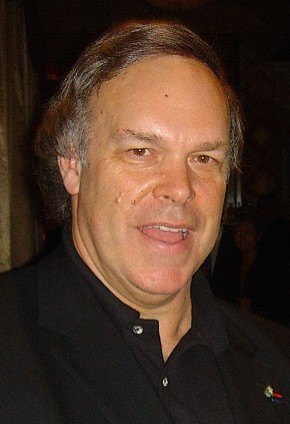
American wine critic Robert M. Parker Jr.

- Pierre Brejoux – Inspector General of the Appellation d'Origine Controlee Board
- Michael Broadbent, MW – influential British wine critic and auctioneer
- Jeb Dunnuck – reviewer for The Wine Advocate and eRobertParker.com
- Gerhard Eichelmann – German wine critic
- Robert Finigan – American wine and restaurant critic
- Patricia Gallagher – American director at the Académie du Vin, judge at the "Judgement of Paris" tasting
- Antonio Galloni – American wine critic, formerly of The Wine Advocate; founder of Vinous
- Joshua Greene – American wine critic, publisher and editor-in-chief of Wine & Spirit
- Huon Hooke – Australian wine critic
- James Laube – American wine critic of Wine Spectator
- Jeannie Cho Lee – first Asian Master of Wine
- Gian Luca Mazzella – international wine critic, journalist and documentarian
- Allen Meadows – American wine critic of Burgundy and Pinot Noir wine with the Burghound.com newsletter
- Jasper Morris, MW – British wine expert
- Robert M. Parker, Jr. – American wine critic, referenced in the term Parkerization of wine
- Lisa Perrotti-Brown - American wine critic for The Wine Advocate, Master of Wine
- Jancis Robinson, MW – wine writer and educator from the UK
- David Schildknecht – American wine critic
- Ricky Schraub – California wine critic
- James Suckling – American wine critic formerly of Wine Spectator
- Stephen Tanzer – American wine critic and editor
- Jon Winroth – American wine critic and educator

== Wine writers ==
Included are media professionals who published about wines in major newspapers, on important TV channels, wrote books or created corresponding websites. Excluded are persons who are mainly known for other reasons and might have published about wine as minor activity.

- Eric Arnold – American author, former wine columnist of Forbes.com
- Eric Asimov – American wine columnist of The New York Times
- Tim Atkin – Master of Wine, journalist, broadcaster, judge
- Ausonius – frequently cited by historians of winemaking, as his works give early evidence of large-scale vineyards and viticulture in France
- Robert Lawrence Balzer – pioneering American wine writer; organizer of the New York Wine Tasting of 1973
- Nicolas Belfrage, MW – British wine writer, Italian wine expert
- Edward Behr – publisher/editor of The Art of Eating
- Jacques Berthomeau – wine writer, author of The Berthomeau Report
- Michel Bettane – French wine writer
- Anthony Dias Blue – American wine writer and organizer of the San Francisco International Wine Competition
- Jon Bonné – American wine columnist of San Francisco Chronicle
- Tom Cannavan – Scottish wine journalist and internet wine site pioneer
- Laura Catena – founder of Catena Institute of Wine, author
- Oz Clarke – British wine writer and TV personality
- Clive Coates, MW – British wine writer
- Katherine Cole – American wine writer, and journalist
- Tyler Colman – American author and wine blogger publishing under the pen name Dr.Vino.com
- Patrick Comiskey – American wine writer of Wine & Spirits and Los Angeles Times
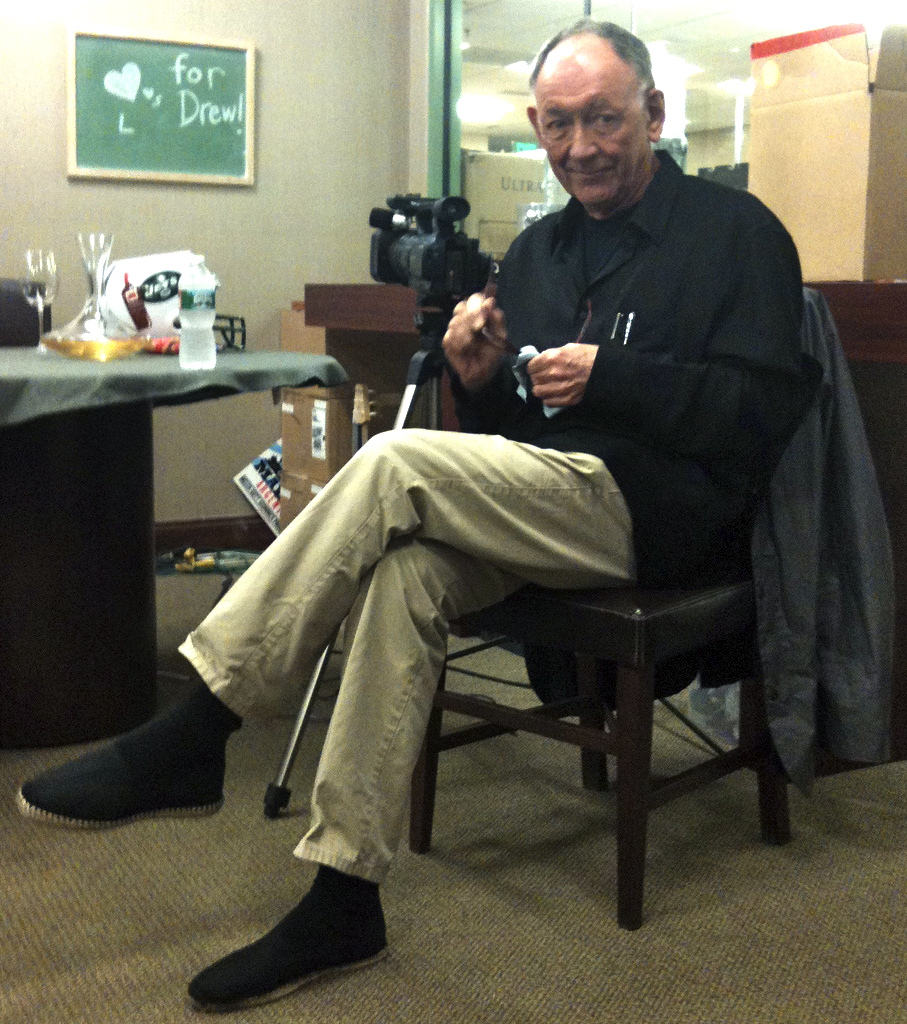
  Kermit Lynch on the set of Wine Library TV
- Julia Coney – Wine writer and creator of Black Wine Professionals database
- Hannah Crosbie – Scottish wine writer and critic
- Tullio De Rosa – Italian author
- Andrew Dornenburg – wine columnist of The Washington Post
- Michel Dovaz – wine teacher and writer
- Len Evans – central figure in Australian wine industry
- Mary Ewing-Mulligan, MW – American author and wine educator
- Joe Fattorini – British wine expert and television and radio personality
- Alice Feiring – American wine writer and "natural wine" advocate
- Doug Frost, MW, MS – American author and wine consultant
- Dorothy Gaiter and John Brecher – former wine columnists of The Wall Street Journal
- Rebecca Gibb, MW – British journalist, editor and Master of Wine
- Paul Gillette – American author and wine writer, an early host of wine show on television
- Malcolm Gluck – British wine writer
- Jamie Goode – British writer and blogger
- Jilly Goolden – British wine critic, journalist and television personality
- Paul Gregutt – wine columnist for The Seattle Times and Pacific Northwest editor of Wine Enthusiast Magazine
- Dara Moskowitz Grumdahl – American wine writer
- James Halliday – Australian wine critic and winemaker
- Anthony Hanson – MW – British Burgundy wine expert
- Steve Heimoff – American wine critic of Wine Enthusiast Magazine, author and wine blogger
- Hugh Johnson – British wine writer
- Marilyn Johnson – Bordeaux wine writer
- Robert Joseph – British wine writer
- Richard Juhlin – Swedish writer focusing on Champagne, one of the leading Champagne connoisseurs in the world
- Matthew Jukes – British wine writer who publishes a number of annual wine reports including the 100 Best Australian Wines
- André Jullien – French wine writer
- Odette Kahn – leading wine writer and authority in France
- Matt Kramer – American wine writer and columnist of The New York Sun, The Oregonian and Wine Spectator
- Monica Larner – Italian reviewer for The Wine Advocate
- John Livingstone-Learmonth – British wine writer, world expert on Rhone wines
- Kermit Lynch – American wine merchant, author
- Peter Liem – American wine writer in Champagne, publisher of ChampagneGuide.net
- Will Lyons – British wine columnist for The Wall Street Journal
- Natalie MacLean – Canadian wine writer and subscription website publisher
- Karen MacNeil – American author, journalist and wine educator
- Neal Martin – reviewer for The Wine Advocate
- Campbell Mattinson – Australian wine writer, editor and author
- Elin McCoy – American author, Bloomberg Markets wine journalist, biographer of Robert M. Parker, Jr.
- Jay McInerney – American novelist and author of A Hedonist in the Cellar
- Georges J. Meekers – wine writer, educator and founder of Wine Campus
- Debra Meiburg, MW – Hong Kong–based wine educator, journalist and wine judge
- Remington Norman – British wine writer
- Kerin O'Keefe – American wine critic and author
- Mark Oldman – author and columnist for The Food Network
- Jeremy Oliver – independent Australian wine writer
- Lawrence Osborne – British journalist, novelist, and author of The Accidental Connoisseur
- Karen Page – wine columnist of The Washington Post
- Edmund Penning-Rowsell – British wine writer
- David Peppercorn, MW – British wine writer
- Stuart Pigott – British Germany-based wine critic of Der Feinschmecker and Weingourmet
- Frank J. Prial – wine columnist for The New York Times
- John Radford – author of wine books, and Spanish wine enthusiast
- Daniel Rogov – Israeli wine critic
- Arne Ronold, MW – Norwegian wine writer and educator
- Anthony Rose – British wine writer for The Independent
- Frank Schoonmaker – wine writer who promoted labeling wines by grape variety
- Joanna Simon – British wine writer
- Pat Simon, MW – British wine writer and importer
- Jennifer Simonetti-Bryan, MW – American wine educator/lecturer
- Olly Smith – British wine expert, present, author and columnist
- Mike Steinberger – American wine columnist of Slate
- Kilien Stengel – author of wine books
- Tom Stevenson – British wine writer and Champagne specialist
- Serena Sutcliffe, MW – British wine writer and the head of Sotheby's International Wine Department
- George M. Taber – American wine writer
- Tammie Teclemariam, American wine journalist
- Anthony Terlato – American wine expert
- Bob Thompson – American wine writer and California specialist
- Keith Wallace American wine expert and founder of the Wine School of Philadelphia
- Alder Yarrow – American wine blogger of Vinography.com
- Franco Ziliani – Italian journalist and wine critic of VinoWire.com

== Sommeliers ==
A trained and knowledgeable wine professional, normally working in fine restaurants, who specializes in all aspects of wine service as well as wine and food pairing. Somebody with a Master Sommelier Diploma issued by the Court of Master Sommeliers or a French Maître Sommelier can be included in this list.

- Astrid Young - Canadian musician artist author and sommelier
- Gerard Basset, MW, MS – British hotelier and world sommelier championship holder
- Andreas Larsson – Swedish sommelier and world sommelier championship holder
- Jonathan Nossiter – American filmmaker and sommelier, director of Mondovino
- Andrea Immer Robinson – wine expert
- Shinya Tasaki – Japanese sommelier and world sommelier championship holder
- Alpana Singh, MS – American sommelier, youngest woman ever to achieve the Master Sommelier designation
- Giuseppe Vaccarini – Italian sommelier and world sommelier championship holder
- Christian Vanneque – sommelier, French wine expert

== Others ==
- Ted Allen – television personality and food and wine expert
- Pancho Campo – Spanish/Chilean event organiser and former MW
- William Vere Cruess – American food scientist who led the rebirth of California wines after the end of Prohibition in 1933
- Hans Denk - Austrian wine expert and priest who developed the Zalto-Denk'Art wine glass
- Rudy Kurniawan – collector and convicted wine counterfeiter
- Eric LeVine – creator of the wine database software CellarTracker, now GrapeStories
- David Lynch – American wine writer, restaurant wine director
- Raymond Oliver – restaurant owner; judge in Paris Wine Tasting of 1976
- Nello Olivo – California wine maker who brought recognition to the El Dorado AVA wine region outside of Napa Valley
- Jules Émile Planchon - 19th Century French botanist remembered for his work in saving French grape vineyards from Phylloxera vastatrix, the microscopic, yellow aphid-like pest that was an exotic species from the United States.
- Charles Valentine Riley - 19th Century British-born American entomologist was among the first to notice that the American grapes, Vitis labrusca were resistant to Phylloxera. His work with J. E. Planchon led to grafting V. vinifera on V. labrusca root stock.
- Roger Scruton – British philosopher, wine columnist of the New Statesman and lecturer on wine philosophy
- Charles F. Shaw – wine marketing innovator
- Pierre Tari – Secretary General of the Association des Grands Crus Classés
- Gary Vaynerchuk – vlog wine critic of Wine Library TV
- Jean-Claude Vrinat – French wine expert and owner of the restaurant Taillevent
- William Charles Winshaw – pioneer South African vintner
- Kevin Zraly – American wine educator and author

== See also ==
- List of celebrities who own wineries and vineyards
