= Jennifer Simonetti-Bryan =

Jennifer Simonetti-Bryan is an American wine educator, consultant and Master of Wine.

Simonetti-Bryan's media appearances include Wine & Spirit, Wine Enthusiast, Gotham Magazine, The New York Times and Wine Library TV, and on networks NBC, CBS and Fox News Channel.

Simonetti-Bryan graduated from the University of Denver her B.A. in International Business in 1995. In 2008, Simonetti-Bryan achieved the Master of Wine title. She was formally accepted by the Institute of Masters of Wine concurrently with fellow inductees that included Debra Meiburg, Jeannie Cho Lee and Pancho Campo.

In 2010, Simonetti-Bryan released a DVD wine seminar course of 24 lectures in The Great Courses series, titled The Everyday Guide to Wine.

== See also ==
- List of wine personalities
