= Rebecca Gibb =

British journalist and Master of Wine

- Born: 1982/1983
- Education: University of Warwick
- Occupations: Wine journalist, wine critic
- Writing career
- Notable awards: 2006 Young Wine Writer of the Year, 2010 Emerging Young Wine Writer of the Year, Bollinger Medal winner, Institute of Masters of Wine Outstanding Achievement Award
- Website: rebeccagibb.com

Rebecca Gibb MW (born 1982/1983) is a British journalist and Master of Wine based in England.

== Biography ==
Gibb grew up in Stockton-on-Tees, County Durham. She graduated in History & Politics from the University of Warwick. In 2006, she was awarded the title of Young Wine Writer of the Year by the Circle of Wine Writers.

In 2010, Gibb received the Emerging Young Wine Writer of the Year award from the prestigious Louis Roederer International Wine Writers Award.

Rebecca Gibb MW started her career in the wine industry working for a wine merchant in Darlington, England where she completed the WSET Diploma course. She was the news and features editor of English wine trade magazine Harpers from 2006-2008 before working as a freelance journalist and editor covering world wine news for a number of international print- and web-based publications including Decanter, Wine Business International, Imbibe, Food & Travel and Sommelier Journal. Gibb joined Wine-Searcher in 2012 and headed the site's editorial content until May 2015. She joined Hong Kong-based Le Pan magazine in May 2015 and was its wine editor until the publication ceased operations.

In September 2015, Rebecca Gibb became a Master of Wine. Out of a record class of 24 graduates, she was awarded the Outstanding Achievement Award for excellence across all parts of the exams and the Bollinger Medal in recognition of outstanding tasting ability

Her research paper focused on the causes of the 1911 Champagne riots.

In 2018 Gibb published The Wines of New Zealand, which was shortlisted in the 'Best Book' category at the 2019 Louis Roederer International Wine Writers Award.

In September 2020, Gibb joined online wine publication Vinous in the position of Editor, and is responsible for coverage of the Loire and New Zealand.

== See also ==
- List of wine personalities
