= Bob Thompson (wine) =

Bob Thompson (1934 in Seattle) is an American wine writer considered an expert on California wine. He has been described by Frank J. Prial as "one of California's foremost wine writers" and "the sage of St. Helena", and by Steve Heimoff as "the dean of California wine writers".

Thompson's involvement with the wine industry began in 1961, when he was hired by Sunset Books as an assistant editor, writing on the subject of wine as well as food and gardening, and met his future wife Harolyn with whom he collaborated. From 1965 to 1969, Thompson worked with the Media Services of the Wine Institute. The book The California Wine Book edited in conjunction with principal editor Doris Muscatine, co-editor Maynard Amerine and with some involvement of Hugh Johnson was published in 1976.

Thompson has written several books on the California wine region including Notes on a California Cellarbook and The Wine Atlas of California and the Pacific Northwest, made numerous contributions to magazines and newspapers such as San Francisco Examiner, and has functioned as an international wine judge. He was designated as the 1989 "wine writer of the year" by the magazine Wines and Vines.

On the subject of Pinot noir, Thompson has stated, "Even where it prospers, [Pinot noir] needs to be coaxed, wheedled, flattered, cajoled, cursed and (or) prayed over almost ounce by ounce through a series of crises that starts at the fermenters and lasts beyond bottling".

== See also ==
- List of wine personalities
