= Mary Ewing-Mulligan =

American author, wine educator and Master of Wine

Mary Ewing-Mulligan is an American author, wine educator and Master of Wine, the first American woman to achieve this accreditation. She has been the Director of the International Wine Center in Manhattan, New York since 1984, and was responsible for the development of Wine & Spirit Education Trust programs in the United States until 2018. She is also a freelance journalist of wine articles for various publications, and the co-author of several wine books in the For Dummies series.

== Career ==
Ewing-Mulligan graduated from the University of Pennsylvania in 1971 with an English major, followed by various positions with the Italian Trade Commission in Philadelphia and later in Manhattan. In 1984 she joined the International Wine Center, a school founded by Albert L. Hotchkin Jr. in 1982. In 1988, Ewing-Mulligan began the preparatory Master of Wine program. She passed the theoretical exam in 1990 on the second attempt, and the blind-tasting exam on the fifth attempt in 1993. In 1997, Ewing-Mulligan bought Hotchkin's shares in the International Wine Center. The IWC is esteemed among the U.S. leading wine schools.

Ewing-Mulligan is a columnist for Wine Review Online and has previously served as wine columnist for The New York Daily News and wine correspondent on the radio program The Splendid Table. She has also contributed articles to publications such as Los Angeles Times, Food & Wine, The New York Times, Gourmet, Wine Spectator, Wine Enthusiast Magazine and Wine & Spirit.

Her books, co-authored with her husband Ed McCarthy, include Wine Style: Using Your Senses to Explore and Enjoy Wine and several publications in the For Dummies series, including Wine For Dummies, Red Wine For Dummies, White Wine For Dummies, French Wine For Dummies, Italian Wine For Dummies and California Wine For Dummies.

== See also ==
- List of wine personalities
