= Léglise (disambiguation) =

Léglise may refer to:

- Léglise, a municipality of Belgium
- Jacques Léglise Trophy, an annual boys' team golf competition between Great Britain & Ireland and the Continent of Europe
- Max Léglise (1924–1996), a French oenologist
