= Jean-Claude Rouzaud =

Jean-Claude Rouzaud is a Frenchman that has served for over 30 years as president of Champagne Louis Roederer. He was Decanter's man of the year 2001.

He is well known for organizing a celebration in 1997 to celebrate his 30th anniversary as president of the well-known Champagne company. The owners of 30 of the best wines in the world, in his judgment, were invited to attend the gala event. Half of his selections were from France. "I’m a chauvinist and a nationalist" he explained. The event took place in two separate parts: first, a dinner featuring Bordeaux wines, then a tasting the next day with all the other wines. Many owners expressed their belief that it was a great pleasure and an honour to have been invited to participate in such a prestigious event.

== See also ==
- French wine
- Bordeaux wine
- List of wine personalities
