= WSET =

WSET may refer to:

- WSET-TV, a television station in Lynchburg, Virginia
- Wine & Spirit Education Trust, an organisation based in London, United Kingdom
