= Chappaz =

Chappaz is a surname. Notable people with the surname include:

- Marie-Thérèse Chappaz (born 1960), Swiss wine maker
- Maurice Chappaz (1916–2009), Swiss-French writer and poet
