= Neal Martin (wine critic) =

Wine journalist and author (born 1971)

- Born: 12 February 1971 (age 55); Leigh-on-Sea, Essex, England, U.K.
- Education: Warwick University
- Occupations: Wine-critic journalist and book writer
- Website: vinous.com (employer)

Neal Martin (born 12 February 1971) is an English wine-critic journalist and book writer, based in the United Kingdom.

He reviews the wines of Bordeaux, Burgundy, South Africa, and New Zealand for the website Vinous.

In 2012, Martin wrote the award-winning book, Pomerol, widely acknowledged to be the definitive book on one of Bordeaux's least-known appellations. In 2013, it won the inaugural André Simon John Avery Award and the Chairman's Award at the Louis Roederer Wine Writers Awards 2013.

== Early life and education ==
Born the eldest of four sons on 12 February 1971 in coastal Leigh-on-Sea in Essex, England, Martin attended Westcliff High School for Boys and continued on to Warwick University in 1989 where he obtained a degree in management science.

== Career ==
After graduation, Martin worked for Lloyd's of London for two years before relocating to Tokyo in 1994 to work as an English teacher.

In 1996, he accepted a position within a Japanese export company working with wine.

When Martin found himself procuring such high-ticket wines as Latour and Petrus without knowing much about them, he enrolled in a Wine & Spirit Education Trust (WSET) wine certification course. Four years later, he passed the WSET Level 4 Diploma in Wines and Spirits, had traveled regularly to European wine regions and visited nearly all the major chateaux in Bordeaux several times; all the time recording tasting notes.

In June 2003, he began writing an independent website, wine-journal.com, that quickly acquired over 100,000 readers.

In 2006, he was approached by Robert Parker to join The Wine Advocate magazine as a reviewer.

In 2012, after three years of research, he published his first book, Pomerol. Comprising three main parts and totaling nearly 600 pages, one part deals with the history of the commune, another contains winery profiles organized alphabetically, and the final part considers every Pomerol cru ever made. Martin decided to self publish the book because, he said, "I'm stubborn and didn't want to compromise – I felt there were parts an editor would take out."

Martin serves as an international wine judge in countries including the UK, South Africa, Japan, Bordeaux, Australia and at the International Wine Challenge as a Panel Chair.

On 20 November 2017, it was announced that Martin would be leaving The Wine Advocate to join Vinous as senior editor.

== Awards ==
- André Simon John Avery Award for Pomerol
- Chairman's Award at the Louis Roederer Wine Writers Awards 2013

== Works ==
- Pomerol (2012), Wine Journal Publishing, ISBN 978-0957430204

== See also ==
- List of English writers
- List of wine professionals
