= Jeannie Cho Lee =

Hong Kong-based Korean-American wine critic

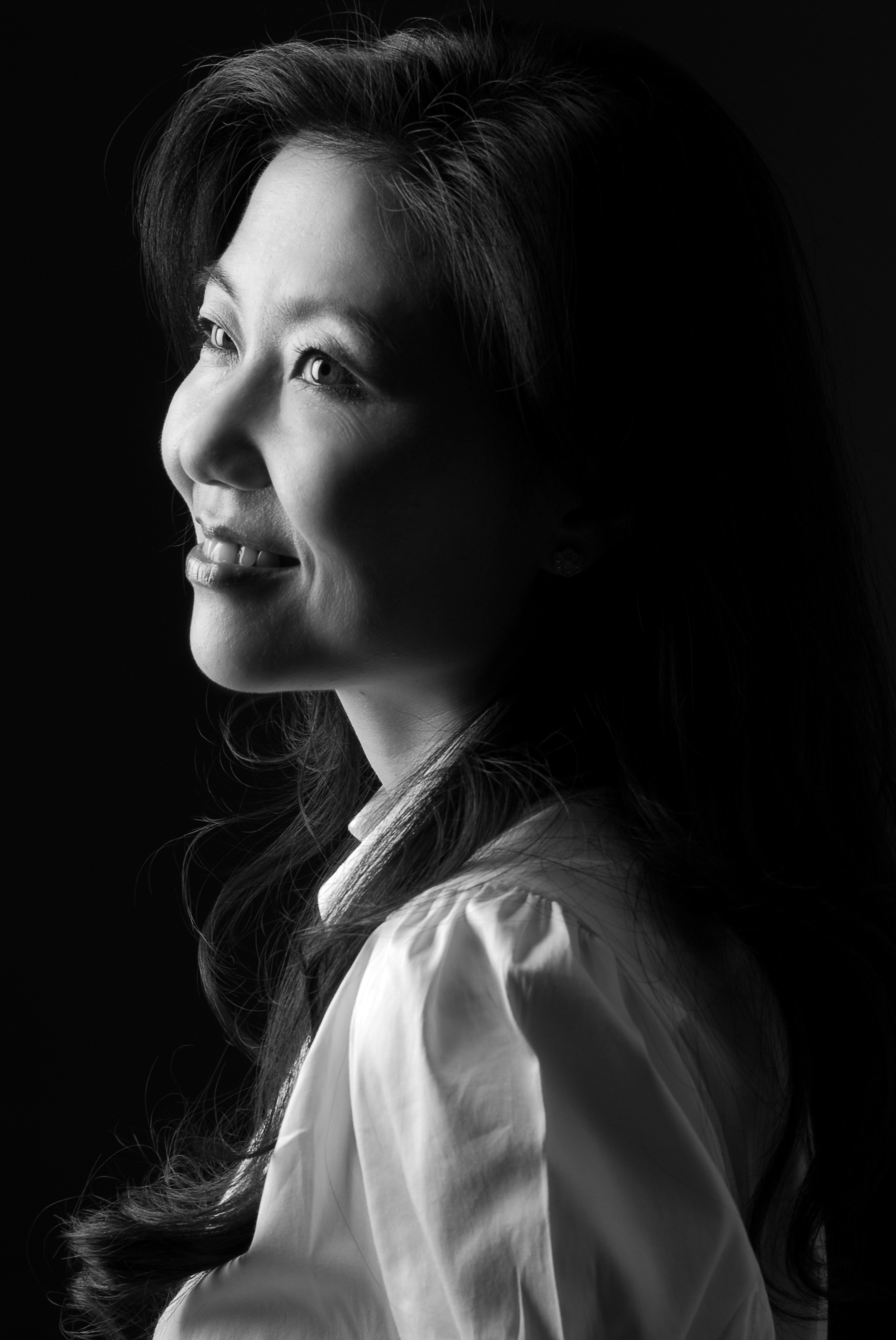
- Born: 1968; Seoul, South Korea
- Citizenship: Hong Kong, China
- Education: Smith College (B.A.); Harvard University (M.P.P.)
- Occupations: Wine critic, journalist, educator and consultant
- Writing career
- Notable works: Asian Palate (2009); Mastering Wine for the Asian Palate (2011)
- Website: jeanniecholee.com/asian-palate

Jeannie Cho Lee (born 1968) is a Hong Kong–based, Korean-American wine critic, author, journalist, consultant, wine educator and Master of Wine, the first ethnic Asian to achieve this accreditation. She was 25th on Decanter's Power List 2013.

== Biography ==
Lee was born in Seoul, Korea and shortly thereafter moved to the United States where she later received her undergraduate degree in arts from Smith College and a master's in public policy from Harvard University. Since 1994, Lee has been based in Hong Kong where, initially pursuing a career in business journalism in Asia, she began writing for publications such as Asia Inc., Far Eastern Economic Review, and The Asset, before contributing to international wine publications such as Wine Spectator, The World of Fine Wine, Wine and Dine, Wine Business International and La Revue du vin de France. Later, in November 2010, she joined Decanter as a contributing editor for Asia. She is also the Co-Chair of Decanter Asia Wine Awards, a sister competition to the Decanter World Wine Awards, launched in 2004.

Jeannie Cho Lee is the first ethnically Asian Master of Wine (MW), a title she received in 2008. In 2022, Lee received a doctor of philosophy (Ph.D.) degree in marketing and branding from the Hong Kong Polytechnic University.

Lee is also the creator and designer of the Jeannie Cho Lee Signature Wine Glass Collection, which she launched in 2014 at the Vinexpo. The collection includes five unique shapes handmade in Italy and a set of machine-made versions distributed in Europe by Zafferano S.r.l. Later that year, she co-hosted the wine program 'In Vino Veritas', which aired on the Hong Kong broadcasting network channel TVB Pearl from October to December. In 2015 the weekly show started its second season with Lee retaining a co-host role.

Lee is a frequent judge at international wine competitions such as the International Wine Challenge, Decanter World Wine Awards, Royal Adelaide Wine Show, Mundus Vini, and Wines of the Pacific Rim. She has also been teaching Wine and Spirit Education Trust courses since 2004 and in 2008 helped establish The Fine Wine School in Hong Kong. In 2009, she received Vinitaly's International Award, and also became a wine consultant to Singapore Airlines, Galaxy Macau, Resorts World Genting and Korean Chamber of Commerce and Industry (KCCI).

Lee's first book, Asian Palate, which explores wine and Asian food pairings, was launched in November 2009. In February 2010, at the Gourmand World Cookbook Awards, Asian Palate was awarded the 'Best Food and Wine Pairing Book in the World'. In June 2011, at the International Association of Culinary Professionals Cookbook Awards 2011, Asian Palate won under the category of 'Wine, Beer or Spirits' category Same month, Asian Palate won under the category of 'Wines and Gastronomy' category at the 2011 OIV Awards. Lee launched her website AsianPalate.com in May 2010.

Lee's second book, Mastering Wine for the Asian Palate (2011), provides a fresh Asian perspective, introducing a new set of Asian wine descriptors. Both books are in their second reprint and are available in English, Korean and simplified Chinese.

Lee's third book The 100 Burgundy, available in English and in Chinese, won the 2020 Gourmand Award for Best Wine Book in the World for French wines and is currently sold out and reprinted in late 2022.

Lee is currently a professor at the Hong Kong Polytechnic University (PolyU), where she helped to launch the Master of Science (MSc) in International Wine Management program offered by the School of Hotel and Tourism Management (SHTM). She is also a visiting professor at the Chinese Culinary Institute and the International Culinary Institute. She is the former publisher and CEO of LE PAN, a wine lifestyle publication.

Lee is a speaker, traveling the world giving seminars and masterclasses on wine, the Chinese market and the quickly evolving Asian consumer market. Lee was selected as one of the top 100 most influential people in Hong Kong by the South China Morning Post and Debrett's in November 2015. She was named the 25th most powerful person in wine by Decanter magazine (UK) and was listed among the top 60 most influential people in wine by La Revue du Vin (France) in 2015.

Recognized for her contributions to the food and wine industry, Lee was awarded Knight in the National Order of the Legion of Honour (Chevalier dans l’Ordre National de la Légion d’Honneur) in 2021 by the President of France.

Over the past decade, Lee has devoted increasingly more time to charities and has raised millions of US dollars for worthy causes including Room to Read, Mother’s Choice and the Hong Kong Society for the Protection for Children. She sits on the board of the Asia Pacific Council of The Nature Conservancy where she raised over US$20 million in the past six years as its gala chairwoman. Lee is also a board member of La Cité du Vin, the most successful, interactive wine museum in Bordeaux that has attracted 2 million visitors since its opening in 2016.

Lee holds a Certificat de Cuisine from Cordon Bleu and trained as a Master Sake Sommelier at Japan's Sake Service Institute. She is a Certified Wine Educator with both the UK's Wine & Spirits Education Trust and the US Society of Wine Educators.

Lee is a member of the following wine organizations and associations:

- The Confrérie des Chevaliers du Tastevin
- The Ordre des Coteaux de Champagne
- Commanderie de Bordeaux
- Commanderie du Bontemps de Médoc et des Graves
- The Knights of Alba
- The Hong Kong Wine Society

== Personal life ==
With her husband, Joseph Lee, she has four daughters. Lee has lived in Hong Kong with her family since 1994.

== Bibliography ==
- Lee, Jeannie Cho (2009). Asian Palate. Asset Publishing. ISBN 978-9881864017.
- Lee, Jeannie Cho (2011). Mastering Wine for the Asian Palate. Asset Publishing. ISBN 978-9881511218.
- Lee, Jeannie Cho (2019). The 100 Burgundy: Exceptional Wines To Build a Dream Cellar. Assouline. ISBN 978-1614288084.

== See also ==
- List of wine personalities
