= First Crush =

First Crush may refer to:

- "First Crush", an episode of Drake & Josh
- "First Crush", a song from the album So Uncool by Keke Palmer

== See also ==
- His First Crush, an album by The Bled
- First Big Crush, a book by Eric Arnold
