= Ernst Loosen =

German winemaker

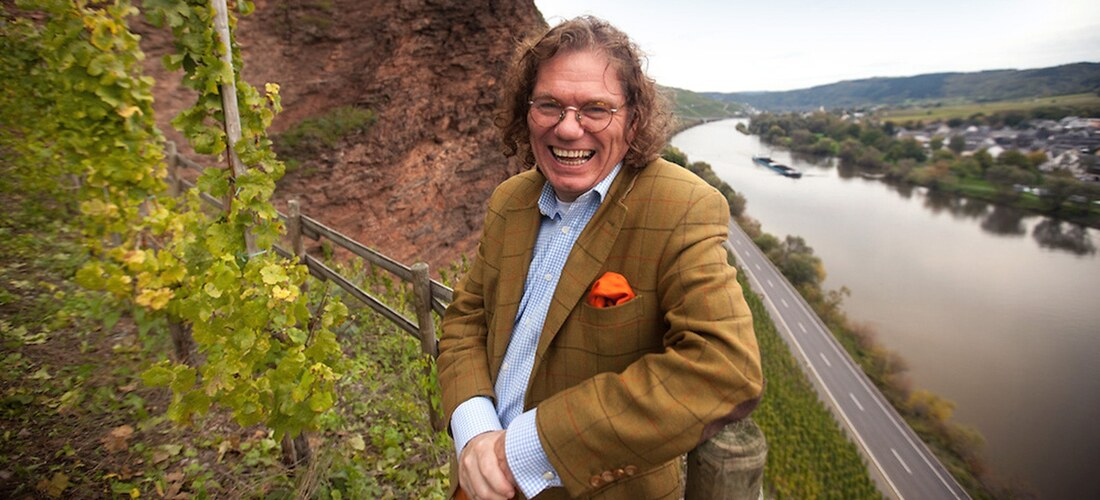
Ernst Loosen

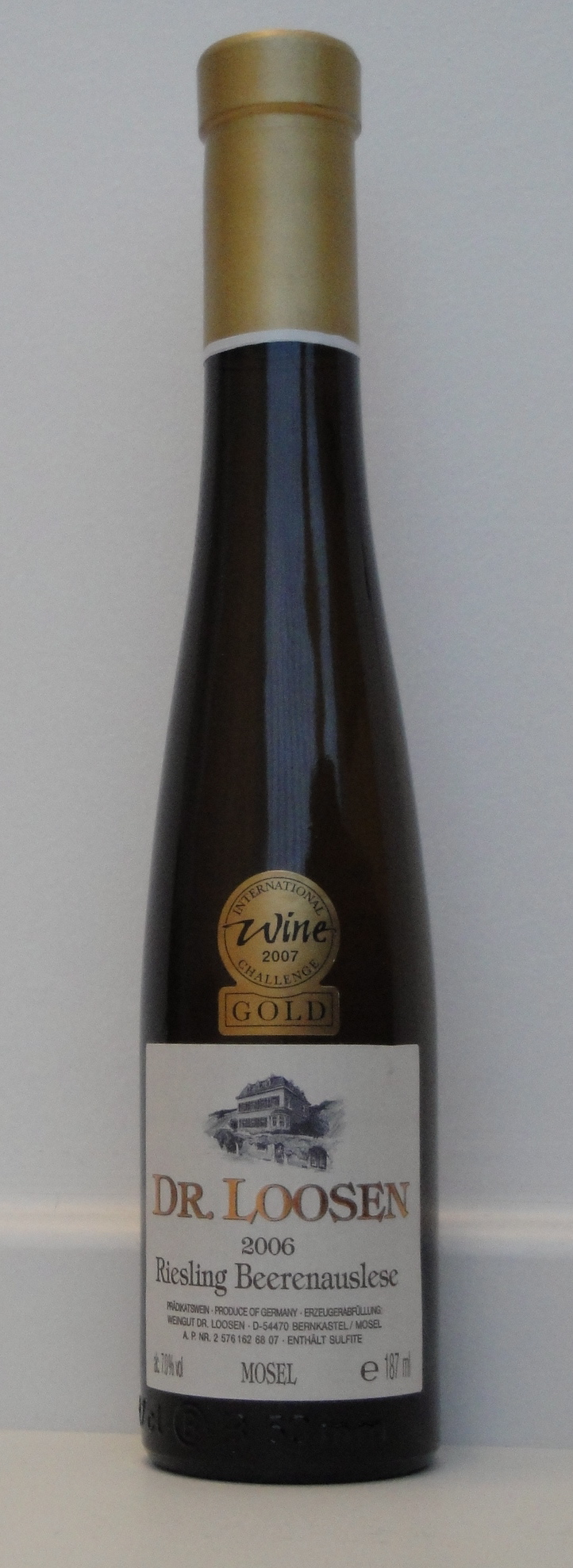
A 187 ml bottle of Riesling Beerenauslese 2006 from Dr. Loosen

Ernst Loosen is a German winemaker and owner of the wine producer Weingut Dr. Loosen, located just outside Bernkastel in the Mosel wine region. With over 130,000 annual bottle production, he is one of the larger producers in the Mosel region. He is particularly known for the quality of his Rieslings, having won "Riesling of the Year" in 1989 as awarded by the German wine trade magazine Feinschmecker.

In 1996 Ernst took over the historic J.L. Wolf estate, in the Pfalz region of Germany. Now known as Villa Wolf, there he produces Riesling in the style of the Rhine Valley, as well as the several Pinot varieties that are traditional in that area.

In 2001, Gault-Millau named Ernst Loosen as the German winemaker of the year, and in 2005, he got selected as Decanter's "Man of the Year". Weingut Dr. Loosen was awarded three stars in Eichelmann Deutschlands Weine 2009.

Having always had a lifelong passion for Pinot Noir, Ernst met Oregon Winemaker Jay Somers who was making Pinot Noir under the J. Christopher Brand. Later in 2010 Ernst acquired a 40 acre property in the Chehalem Mountains AVA, in Oregon's Northern Willamette Valley where he would partner with J Christopher Wines and constructed the J Christopher Winery and the adjoining Appassionata Vineyard. Over the last decade, J. Christopher has earned international acclaim and was named a Wine & Spirits World Top 100 Winery in 2017. In 2020 Dr. Loosen counted among the top 50 wine destinations worldwide.

== See also ==
- List of wine personalities
- German wine classification
