= Stuart Pigott =

British wine critic and author (born 1960)

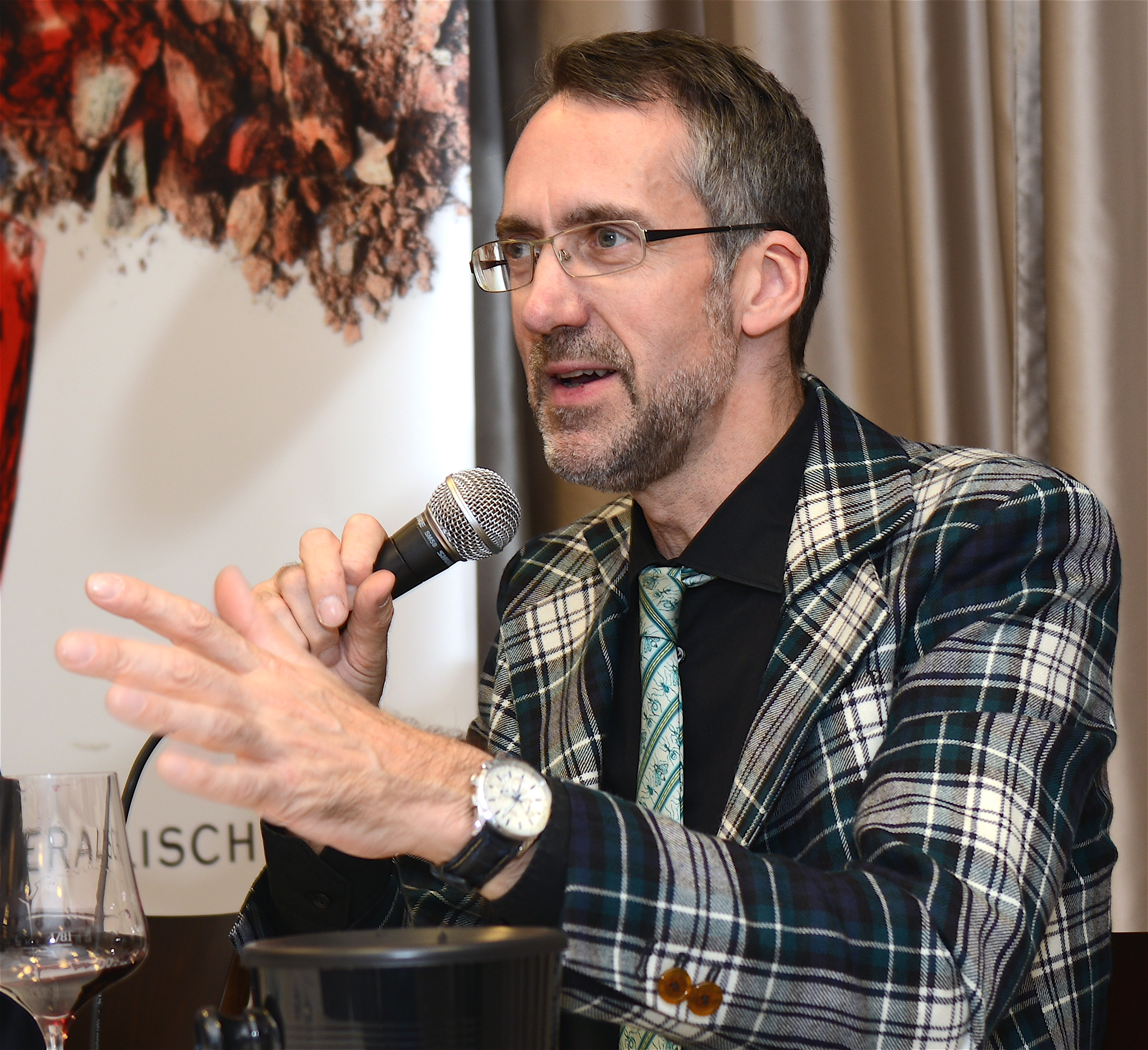
- Born: 26 May 1960 (age 66); Orpington
- Occupations: Wine writer, critic
- Writing career
- Subject: Wine

Stuart Pigott (born 26 May 1960 in Orpington, Kent) is a British wine critic and author who has lived in Berlin since 1993. Pigott mostly writes in German, and focuses on German wine. He writes for the specialist magazines Feinschmecker and Weingourmet as well as the Sunday edition of the Frankfurter Allgemeine Zeitung.

== Biography ==
Between 1979 and 1986, Pigott studied various art-related subjects off and on at Goldsmiths College of Art, St. Martins School of Art and the Royal College of Art. He ended up with a master's degree in the History of Culture. During his studies he started as a wine writer, and published his first piece in Decanter magazine in 1984.

Pigott moved to Berlin with his wife, sommelier and later food writer Ursula Heinzelmann, in late 1993 and published his first German-language book in 1994. From early on, he joined fellow British wine writer Hugh Johnson in taking a critical view towards the mass production mentality that prevailed in parts of the German wine industry, and thus became popular with more quality-oriented producers.

Taking his inspiration from Hunter S. Thompson and Tom Wolfe, Pigott has in recent years tried to emulate the style of Gonzo journalism in the wine area. He has published a number of free educational wine videos in the "Gonzo" style on the Internet. In the semester 2008/2009 he took lessons at the University of Applied Sciences in Geisenheim comprising the Geisenheim Grape Breeding Institute.

== Stuart Pigott's five commandments ==
As part of his educational material, Pigott uses the following five commandments on wine:

1. A wine is as good or bad as it tastes and smells to you.
2. For wine, there is no connection between price and quality.
3. Wine is not nearly so complicated or delicate as generally assumed.
4. There are no wrong words to describe wine.
5. There is only one error that is possible to make in connection with wine: to ruin other people's pleasure.

== See also ==
- List of wine personalities
