= Georges Meekers =

Belgian wine writer and educator (born 1965)

Georges J. M. Meekers (born 1965 in Sint-Truiden, Belgium) is a wine writer and educator based in Malta.

His writing career began in the 1990s, when he wrote a wine column for Malta Today. He continues to contribute to The Times of Malta and several international wine trade magazines, such as Harpers Magazine, with vintage reports on Malta and other upcoming wine regions. He is also the author of the first reference book on the Maltese wine industry.

Outside Malta, Meekers is perhaps best known for his role as founder of the wine academy specialising in online wine tuition Wine Campus; he is also head of sales at the winery Emmanuel Delicata Winemaker, and is a member of the Circle of Wine Writers (UK).

== Awards ==
His publication 'Wines of Malta – the essential guide' was awarded 'Best Wine Guide' at the Gourmand World Cookbook Award in London, 2008.

== Selected bibliography ==
- Georges Meekers, Wines of Malta – The Essential Guide, 2007
- Georges Meekers, Georges Meekers' Cleanskin - A Vinous Expose, 2011
- Georges Meekers, Wines of Malta, The Definitive Guide to the New Heritage Wines of Malta and Gozo, 2011 |e-book|

== See also ==
- List of wine personalities
