= Doug Frost =

Doug Frost may refer to:

- Doug Frost (swimming coach) (born 1943), Australian swimming coach
- Doug Frost (wine), American Master of Wine, Master Sommelier and author
- Douglas Frost, drummer in the English band English Teacher
