= Remington Norman =

British wine writer

- Occupations: wine merchant and author

Remington Norman is a wine merchant and author who has written books on Burgundy and Rhone style wine. He became a Master of Wine in 1984 and resigned from this Institute in 2004. He is a two-time winner of the Andre Simon Prize. in 1982 he passed the BASI exams to become a qualified ski instructor, following which he led several Ski Club of Great Britain ski parties in Val d’Isère and other alpine resorts.

In 1996, his contribution to wine knowledge and appreciation was recognized when he was elected to the Academie Internationale du Vin.[3].

== Biography ==
Remington Norman was educated at Harrow School and Oxford University where he obtained Doctorate of Philosophy and taught. He opened up fine wine shops in London, England and expanded his interest to writing. He is married to Geraldine Norman and lives in Wiltshire, England.

== Awards ==
In 1992, his book The Great Domaines of Burgundy won the Andre Simon Prize for the best wine book of its year and was awarded the gold medal of the German Gastronomic Society. His second work, Rhone Renaissance published in 1996, won the Andre Simon Award, Le Prix du Champagne Lanson and the Glenfiddich Prize. His third book, Sense and Semblance - An Anatomy of Superficiality in Modern Society - was published in 2007 His fourth book: Grand Cru: The Great Wines of Burgundy through the Perspective of its Finest Vineyards was published in 2010. .

== See also ==
- List of wine personalities

== Bibliography ==
- Grand Cru: The Great Wines of Burgundy Through the Perspective of its Finest Vineyards foreword by Aubert de Villaine; Kyle Cathie, London. (2010). ISBN 978-1-85626-920-9
- The Great Domaines of Burgundy: A Guide to the Finest Wine Producers of the Cote D'or with Charles Taylor MW; Kyle Cathie (2010). London; ISBN 978-1-85626-812-7
- Sense & Semblance: An Anatomy of Superficiality in Modern Society(2007). Founthill. ISBN 978-0-9555176-0-0
- Rhone Renaissance: The Finest Rhone and Rhone Style Wines from France and the New World (1996). Wine Appreciation Guild. ISBN 0-932664-95-4
- Cote d' Or. Die grossen Weingüter im Herzen Burgunds (1996). Hallwag Verlag. ISBN 3-7742-5189-4
