= Jacques Puisais =

French oenologist (1927–2020)

Jacques Puisais (8 June 1927 – 6 December 2020) was known worldwide as a French oenologist and taste philosopher.

== Life and career ==
Puisais was born in Poitiers, France, on 8 June 1927. He held a PhD in chemistry, and directed the Laboratoire Départemental et Régional d'Analyses in Tours. Puisais started giving courses of taste education in 1964. He was a member of the INAO.

He created the Institut Français du Goût in 1976, in order to develop multidisciplinary research around taste and food sensitivity. Eager to introduce children to taste, Puisais developed a method of sensory awakening that has been used in classrooms since then.

His main book is "Le goût juste des vins et des plats", a bestseller published in 1985.

He died from COVID-19 on 6 December 2020, at the age of 93.

== See also ==
- List of wine personalities
