= Bottlenotes =

Wine community site in Palo Alto, California

Bottlenotes Inc
- Company type: Private
- Industry: Internet
- Founded: Palo Alto, California (June 2005)
- Headquarters: Palo Alto
- Number of employees: 6
- Website: www.bottlenotes.com

Bottlenotes is a wine community site founded in June 2005 in Palo Alto, California by Kim Donaldson and Alyssa Rapp. The original business plan was completed by Rapp with the help of classmates from the Stanford Graduate School of Business between 2003 & 2005. The site was developed as an e-commerce site that matched users’ taste preferences with wine options and was featured in numerous publications including Wine Enthusiast Magazine. It has now become a media platform with both marketing and social media capabilities. The company's use of social media and user feedback has been featured in the Entrepreneur Magazine blog, SUCCESS Magazine, and Fox News.

Bottlenotes hosts wine tastings in cities across the U.S. called Around the World in 80 Sips that have been featured in The New York Times Dining Calendar, produces The Daily Sip, a daily e-newsletter with over 150,000 subscribers edited by Karen MacNeil, author of The Wine Bible, and has created an iPhone app that allows users to rate, remember, and record notes on wines they've tried, and share that information with other users. The app was an official Honoree of the 2011 Webby Awards.
