= Matthew Jukes =

British wine journalist (1967–2026)

Matthew Shaw Jukes (17 September 1967 – 6 August 2026) was a British wine writer. He published several annual wine reports including the 100 Best Australian Wines, the Bordeaux En Primeur Report, the Burgundy En Primeur Report and, from 2017, a Piemonte Report.

== Life and career ==
Matthew Shaw Jukes was born on 17 September 1967.

After three years on a weekly radio slot for the BBC, Channel 4 approached Jukes to host 'Wine Hunt'.

He created a line of non-alcoholic drinks: 'Jukes Cordialities'.

Jukes died whilst on holiday in Portugal, on 6 August 2026, aged 58.

== Awards ==
In January 2012, Jukes was awarded the Honorary Australian of the Year Award by the Australia Day Foundation. It recognises a non-Australian resident of the UK who displays "Australian characteristics" or has contributed significantly to Australia.

In May 2011, Off Licence News voted Jukes the most influential wine writer in the UK.

His book, Taste Food & Wine, co-written with Tyson Stelzer, won the Australian Food Media Award for Best Food and Writing.

In 2002, Jukes won the International Wine and Spirit Competition’s Trophy for Wine Communicator of the Year.

== Publications ==
- Quintessentially's 100 Most Iconic Wine Estates
- The Wine Book: Change the way you think about wines of the world (2 editions)
- Wine – everything you ever wanted to know but were afraid to ask (2 editions)
- The Wine List – The Top 250 wines of the year (6 editions)
- Taste Food & Wine, in conjunction with Tyson Stelzer, Australia (3 editions)
