= James Laube =

American wine critic (1951/1952–2025)

James Laube (/ˈlɔːbi/ LAW-bee, 1951 or 1952 – March 22, 2025) was an American wine critic, writing for Wine Spectator since 1980, a full-time staff writer from 1983 on, with expertise on California wine. Laube had published the books California's Great Cabernets, California's Great Chardonnays, and California Wine containing nearly 700 winery profiles with chapters on California wine history, grapes, and wine styles, which won the 1996 James Beard Award for best wine book of the year. James died on March 21, 2025, age the age of 73.

== TCA taint controversy ==
A Wine Spectator report by Laube that Chateau Montelena wine was tainted by TCA, was followed by a great deal of controversy, and the contention that Laube was able to detect TCA at much lower levels than most people. In a letter to the San Francisco Chronicle, Steve Heimoff, an editor of a competing wine magazine Wine Enthusiast, wrote that Laube's position as a critic in a prominent magazine should be more cautious about branding wines as being tainted when most wine drinkers do not have the same level of sensitivity to detect anything wrong with those wines.

== Influence on California wine ==
As the lead reviewer of wines from California for Wine Spectator, Laube's influence over the California wine industry was compared to that of the Wine Advocate's Robert M. Parker, Jr. Laube's preference for high alcohol, full-bodied wines that have been aged in oak has been charged by some critics as a possible reason for the high numbers of that style of wine being produced in California.

== See also ==
- List of wine personalities
