= Jacques Berthomeau =

French civil servant

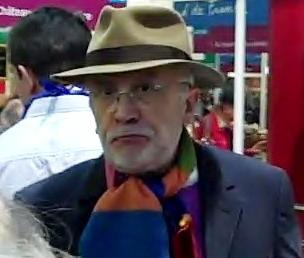
Jacques Berthomeau

Jacques Berthomeau (1948-2022) was a wine consultant commissioned by the French Ministry of Agriculture to prepare a report in 2001, now known as The Berthomeau Report, to "establish the goals and means to be deployed in terms of people, regulations and finance for a winning strategy for French wine as we approach the year 2010". Berthomeau headed a committee that called for French winemakers to meet the globalization of wine by adapting to new market demands, similar to those called for in Plan Bordeaux. The Berthomeau Report, like Plan Bordeaux, has met considerable organized opposition. Jacques Berthomeau was the co-founder of the Les5duVin wine site. He died on Sunday 6 November 2022.

== See also ==
- Bordeaux wine
- Wine lake
- List of wine personalities
