= Tyler Colman =

American author

Tyler Colman, writing under the pen name Dr. Vino, is an American author with a PhD in political science from Northwestern University, and wine educator with the New York University and the University of Chicago, and publisher of one of the internet's most highly rated wine blogs, which won the Best Wine Blog and Best Wine Blog writing in the 2007 American Wine Blog Awards and was nominated for a James Beard Foundation award. A Forbes.com story quoted one expert describing DrVino.com: "His reporting over the past six months has had seismic consequences, which is a hell of an accomplishment for a blog."

Colman's articles have also appeared in publications that include The New York Times, Food & Wine, Forbes.com, and Wine & Spirits. In September 2008, a Colman article on wine politics featured in the expert guide The Guardian & The Observer Guide to Wine.

The University of California Press published Colman's first book, Wine Politics: How Governments, Environmentalists, Mobsters, and Critics Influence the Wines We Drink in July 2008. Simon & Schuster published his second book, A Year of Wine: Perfect Pairings, Great Buys, and What to Sip for Each Season in November 2008. Colman is among the contributors to The Oxford Companion to Wine since the third edition. He has also co-authored with sustainability metrics specialist Pablo Päster a widely cited study on the carbon footprint of wine, for the American Association of Wine Economists.

== See also ==
- List of wine personalities
