= Debra Meiburg =

- Born: Sonoma County, California
- Education: Institute of Masters of Wine (MW); Rochester Institute of Technology (M.S.)Sonoma State University (B.A.)
- Occupations: Director, MWM International Ltd. Director, Meiburg Wine Media Ltd.
- Known for: Master of Wine

Debra Meiburg MW is a multi-media wine journalist, wine educator, wine judge and the first recipient of the Master of Wine title in Asia. She is also founding director, along with the Hong Kong Trade Development Council, of the Cathay Hong Kong International Wine & Spirit Competition. Now in its 18th year, it is the largest pan-Asian wine competition. Having passed the Certified Public Accountant (CPA) exams, Meiburg was formerly an accountant at Price Waterhouse Coopers Hong Kong. Meiburg's career change into wine saw her focus on wine education and journalism, but she has worked in vineyards and wineries in Chile, Bordeaux, South Africa and New York. Born in Sonoma County, she is a long-time and permanent resident of Hong Kong.

== Education ==
In 2008, Meiburg was awarded the Master of Wine qualification by the Institute of Masters of Wine in the United Kingdom. Generally regarded in the wine industry as one of the highest standards of professional knowledge, Meiburg was awarded the title following her dissertation, "Wine Education and Training in Hong Kong and China: What Are the Wine Knowledge and Education Needs of the Wine Trade?"

Meiburg also has a master's degree in Hospitality and Service Management, and is a Certified Wine Educator, per the Society of Wine Educators. She holds a Certificate of Advanced Wine Sensory Assessment from the Australian Wine Research Institute, and a Higher Certificate with Distinction from the Wine and Spirit Education Trust, UK.

== Awards and recognitions ==
• 7th of Top 50 Most Powerful Women in Wine by The Drinks Business
• Il Premio Internazionale (Vinitaly International Award 2012)
• Decanter's list of seven names to watch in 2013
• China Power List by WINE Magazine 2012
• Wine Business International - Most Influential Wine Journalist in Hong Kong
• Entrepreneur of the Year, South China Morning Post and AmCham, Women of Influence Awards 2013
• Gente Dame d'Honneur de l'Ordre des Hospitaliers de Pomerol
• Best of the Best International Speakers' Award Young Presidents' Organization
• Prestige Woman of Power 2022
• Chevalier, l'Ordre du Merite Agricole

== Wine educator ==
Debra Meiburg was a Professor of Wine at the School of Hospitality and Service Management, Rochester Institute of Technology. Her current wine education positions in Hong Kong include External Examiner of the Professional Diploma in Wine Assessment and Service at the Open University of Hong Kong (traditional Chinese: 香港公開大學) and Assistant Training Consultant, Hong Kong Institute of Vocational Education (IVE) (traditional Chinese: 香港專業教育學院). Meiburg is a Certified Wine Educator, of the Society of Wine Educators.

== Wine journalism ==
Meiburg is the author of Debra Meiburg's Guide to the Hong Kong Wine Trade, Debra Meiburg's Guide to the Shanghai Wine Trade, Debra Meiburg's Guide to the Singapore Wine Trade, Debra Meiburg's Guide to the Beijing Wine Trade, Debra Meiburg's Guide to the Taiwan Wine Trade and the award-winning Tasting Wine with Debra. She is the creator of Grape Cues, a wine industry study card series.

She is a columnist for the South China Morning Post and was a contributing editor to the Asian Tatler magazine group. Other publications Meiburg has contributed to include WINE Magazine (China), Jetsetter Magazine, Journal of American Wine Society, Rochester Democrat & Chronicle and Rochester Magazine.

== Broadcast media ==
Meiburg is producer and host of Taste the Wine, a wine travel television show. She is also creator and host of the weekly online video interview series Meet the Winemaker, launched in December 2009. Taped in Hong Kong, Meiburg interviews winemakers, winery owners and other key figures in the wine world. Episodes have featured wine personalities including Ernst Loosen, Sam Neill, Emmanuel Cruse (Grand Maitre of the Commanderie de Bordeaux), Philippe Magrez (son of French wine magnet Bernard Magrez). Meet the Winemaker is hosted on YouTube on the Meet the Winemaker channel. Meiburg is also host of a series of short wine education videos broadcast in approximately 20,000 taxis in China and Hong Kong, and is presenter in numerous wine documentaries, such as The New Wines of Greece.

== Wine judging ==
Meiburg is a Certified Wine Judge by the American Wine Society. International competitions she has judged include the Sydney International Wine Competition, Argentina Wine Awards, McLaren Vale Wineshow, Royal Melbourne Wine Awards, Sonoma County Harvest Fair Wine Competition, SOPEXA: Everyday Bordeaux, Cathay Pacific Hong Kong International Wine & Spirit Competition, International Wine & Spirit Competition, Wines of Chile Awards, Qantas Wine Show of Western Australia, Finger Lakes International Wine Competition, WinPac Hong Kong, International Eastern Wine Competition, Decanter Hungary, International Wine Challenge and the New York State Fair.
