= Huon Hooke =

Australian wine writer and critic

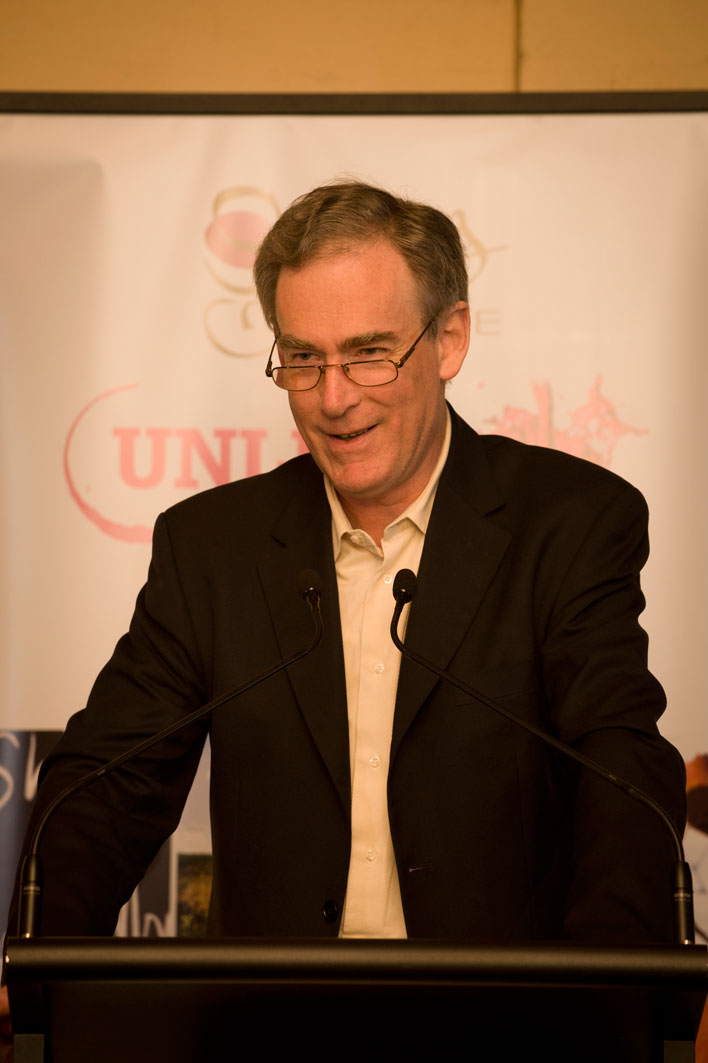
Huon Hooke at Geelong Wine Show 2010

Huon Hooke is an Australian wine writer and critic.

Hooke is the Chair of the Vin de Champagne Awards and judge of the Australian Winemaker of the Year. He tastes wines blind and writes for The Real Review, Decanter and Gourmet Traveller Wine, Sydney Morning Herald. Hooke judges about ten wine competitions a year in Australia, New Zealand, Italy and other countries.

== Life and career ==
Hooke's career in wine started in 1983. Today he is known for his reviews in the Gourmet Traveller Wine magazine and his weekly wine section in the Sydney Morning Herald Good Living section. In 2011 Hooke started his own website and mobile app, which contain all of his tasting notes. In 2016 he and Bob Campbell MW became the Principal Wine Writers for The Real Review, a wine review website focussing on Australian and New Zealand wines.

Hooke chairs Australia’s Wine List of The Year, is the founding chairman of the Boutique Wine Awards and judges about 10 competitions per year in countries such as Australia, New Zealand, Italy, England, Canada, Chile, Belgium, Japan, Slovenia, and South Africa. Hooke has hosted corporate tastings and dinners and has given many wine appreciation courses.

For 17 years, Hooke co-authored the Penguin Good Australian Wine Guide.

Hooke has been awarded eight reviews for wine writing. He was awarded 2008 Wine Communicator of the Year and 2018 Legend of the Vine, awarded by Wine Communicators of Australia for his outstanding contribution to the Australian wine industry.

Hooke's long-term partner was Australian artist Bronwyn Oliver.

== Scoring method ==
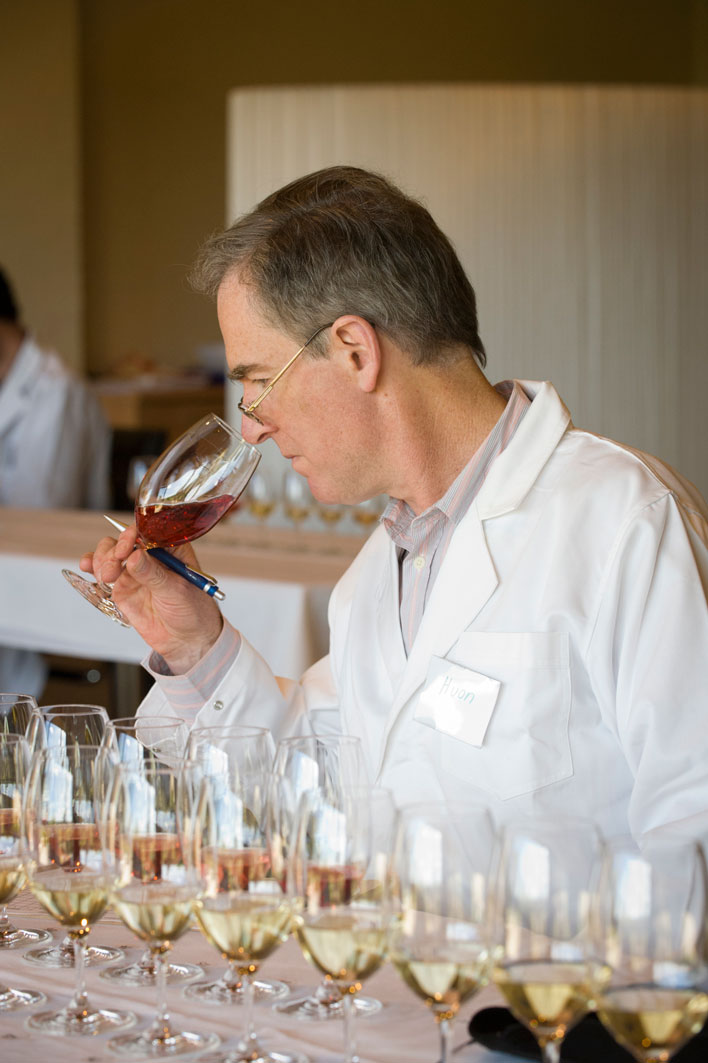
Huon Hooke at Geelong wine show

Hooke prefers blind tastings and is independent from any retail interests. He does not hire other people to taste wine on his behalf. On his website, Hooke describes his approach as follows:

Almost all the wines I review are first tasted ‘blind’. I believe it is important for that first impression to be uncoloured by any preconception that may come from viewing the label. Having blind-tasted, though, I don’t consider the result to be holy writ: after unmasking I always check, and if necessary re-taste. No-one’s palate is perfect and there are always wines that will “fall through the cracks”, ending up with rougher treatment than they deserve. In blind tasting, it is easy for a minor blemish to have a disproportionate influence on the assessment. We have to be mindful that wine is a drink, and often, wines with a small imperfection are often great to drink. A slight whiff of reduction in a young riesling may be a defect to a clinical blind-taster in his ivory tower, but in the final summation, it is barely worth commenting on – and usually dissipates after a little exposure to the air anyway.

== Wine review coverage ==
Hooke's wine reviews comprise 55,000 notes and ratings and are focused on wines from the following countries:

- Australia
- New Zealand
- France – Bordeaux, Champagne, Burgundy and Rhone wines
- Italy – Barolo. Hooke often participates in annual tasting events in Piemonte

== Books ==
- The Penguin Good Australian Wine Guide 1994-95, (1994), ISBN 978-0140244502
- Max Schubert, Winemaker, (1994) ISBN 978-1875703197
- The Penguin Good Australian Wine Guide 1996-97, (1996) ISBN 978-0140260090
- Max Schubert (1996), ISBN 978-1875703227
- The Penguin Good Australian Wine Guide 1997-98, (1997) ISBN 978-0140268225
- Words on Wine, (1997) ISBN 978-1862901209
- The Penguin Wine Cellar Book (1999), ISBN 978-0670883141
- The Penguin Good Australian Wine Guide: 1999, (1999; co-authored with Ralph Kyte-Powell) ISBN 978-0140287738
- Good Australian Wine Guide, (2000; co-authored with Ralph Kyte-Powell) ISBN 978-0140287738
- The Penguin Good Australian Wine Guide 2003, (2003) ISBN 978-0143001164
- The Penguin Good Australian Wine Guide 2004-05, (2004), ISBN 978-0143002772
- The Penguin Good Australian Wine Guide 2006, (2006) ISBN 978-0143002734
