= Christian Delpeuch =

French winemaker

Christian Delpeuch is president emeritus of the French Conseil Interprofessionel du Vin de Bordeaux (CIVB). He won support for Plan Bordeaux, an effort to save the wine industry of Bordeaux. The plan calls for growers to reduce yields, decrease total area of vineyards, divert excess wine into production of ethanol fuels and cleaning solutions, reclassify lesser vineyards as vin de pays, and start putting varietal names on wine labels.

== Background ==
The wine industry of Bordeaux has been facing continuing and severe economic problems. A wine glut led to the sale of 26 million bottles of wine for conversion into industrial alcohol in 2004. This was the first time in history that AOC wines have been sold for that purpose.

New World consumers tend to prefer buying wine by grape variety and also from brand name producers rather than from unknown chateaux. Domestic consumption in France continues to shrink in the face of a growing neo-prohibitionism. At the same time exports are falling in the face of growing competition from excellent wines sold at lower prices. Australia now exports more wine to Great Britain than does France and the latter's share of the U.S. market continues to drop.

Many producers have had to sell their wine below cost, leading to bankruptcies and early retirements. Between 1994 and 2005, the number of growers in Bordeaux shrank from 14,000 to 10,000. It is expected that this trend will continue, with more estates going out of business while others merge and grow in size.

Delpeuch hoped to reduce production, improve quality, and sell more wine in the United States. However, two years after the beginning of Plan Bordeaux, Mr Delpeuch resigned, "citing the failure of the French government to address properly the wine crisis in Bordeaux." Delpeuch told journalists assembled at the Bordeaux Press Club "I refuse to countenance this continual putting off of decisions which can only end in failure."

"Delpeuch said he was shocked and disappointed by the failure of his efforts – and by the lack of co-operation from winemakers and negociants themselves - to achieve anything concrete in terms of reforms to the Bordeaux wine industry over the last 24 months."

His resignation took effect on 10 July 2006.

== See also ==
- French wine
- List of wine personalities
