= Pat Simon =

Stanley Patrick Evelyn Simon (14 March 1920 – 22 May 2008) was a veteran English Master of Wine, wine-merchant and writer on wine.

== Career ==
After six years at Gresham's School, Holt (1931–1937), and military service during the Second World War, Simon entered the wine trade in 1948, importing wines chiefly from France, Germany, Italy, and Portugal, but later also from Spain, South Africa, Australia and the United States. Going into business on his account as an importer and wholesaler of wines (trading as Pat Simon Wines Ltd), by 1969 he rose to the rank of Master of Wine of the Institute of Masters of Wine and became a frequent contributor to specialist periodicals.

Simon's book Wine-tasters' Logic (2000) distils the experiences of fifty years of wine-tasting and is also full of anecdotes of the wine trade of long ago. The first part of the book discusses the concepts behind wine-tasting, exploring areas like aroma, balance, finish, and tannin. The second part contains details on, the choice of glasses and instructions for decanting wine correctly.

== Publications ==
- Wine-tasters' Logic (Mitchell Beazley, London, 2000) ISBN 978-0-571-20287-4
- Wine-tasters' Logic (Faber & Faber Paperbacks, London, 2001) ISBN 0-571-20287-X

== See also ==
- List of wine personalities
