= Sean Thackrey =

American winemaker (1942–2022)

- Born: July 9, 1942; Los Angeles, California, U.S.
- Died: May 30, 2022 (aged 79); Walnut Creek, California, U.S.
- Education: Reed College; Vienna College; University of California, Davis
- Occupation: Winemaker
- Partner: Susan
- Parents: Eugene Thackrey (father); Winfrid Kay (Knudtson)Thackrey (mother)

Sean Haley Thackrey (July 9, 1942 – May 30, 2022) was an American winemaker based in the town of Bolinas in Marin County, California. Prior to winemaking, he was a director of an art gallery. Thackrey has been described as having been an unconventional winemaker who did pioneering work in promoting California Syrah.

== Early life ==
Thackrey was born in Los Angeles on July 9, 1942. His father, Eugene, worked as a journalist and playwright; his mother, Winfrid "Kay" Knudtson, was employed as a script supervisor in Hollywood. Starting in 1959, Thackrey studied art history at Reed College in Portland, Oregon, where he was taught by Lloyd J. Reynolds. He went to the University of Vienna as a sophomore, before going back briefly to Reed. He eventually dropped out in 1962.

After leaving Reed, Thackrey moved to Bolinas in 1964, and for a while worked as a book editor for the Sierra Club. Six years later, Thackrey, with Susan Thackrey and Cynthia Pritzker, opened the art gallery in San Francisco that became Thackrey & Robertson, by then in partnership with watercolorist Sally Robertson; the gallery remained operational until its closure in 1995. Thackrey's particular expertise was in early photography, exhibition of which the gallery was an internationally renowned pioneer in.

== Career ==
After several years in Berkeley and San Francisco, Thackrey moved back to Bolinas in 1977. Following initial winemaking experiments with Cabernet Sauvignon grapes purchased from Fay Vineyard in Napa Valley, Thackrey became a bonded winemaker in 1981, as the Thackrey & Co. winery. Some early problems with Lactobacillus led Thackrey to take extension courses at the University of California, Davis College of Agricultural and Environmental Sciences, although he stated he had little use for the scientific approach to winemaking.

Thackrey sourced fruit from grape growers in Napa Valley, Marin County and Mendocino, and was prone to employ the unconventional technique of letting grapes 'rest' at least 24 hours outside, fermenting under the stars. Thackrey contended the idea can be traced to the texts of the Greek poet Hesiod, Works and Days (circa 700 B.C.), and has been used by various wineries around the world. Thackrey said this method was commonplace in wine literature until the middle of the 19th century.

=== Wines ===
Thackrey produced his first vintage in 1981, a Merlot/Cabernet Sauvignon blend named Aquila, which had an initial production of 190 cases (17 hl).

Thackrey's flagship wine is Orion (Sean Thackrey Orion Rossi Vineyard St. Helena California Native Red Wine), produced from 1986 to 1990 using Syrah grapes from Arthur Schmidt's old vine vineyard near Yountville, California, until this was bought by Clarke Swanson, and since 1992 from the 5-acre (2.0 ha) Rossi vineyard in St. Helena, planted in 1905. Thackrey was uncertain what grape varieties were in the field blend, and vineyard tests by researchers at UC Davis were inconclusive.

First released in 1992, The Pleiades (Sean Thackrey Pleiades California Red Table Wine) was an experimental nonvintage blend made from a host of different grape varieties (potentially both white and red, including Barbera, Carignan, Syrah, Pinot noir, Zinfandel, Mourvèdre and Grenache), potentially from various regions and vintages. The recipe varied every year, depending on the decisions of Thackrey and the fruit sourced. According to Thackrey, "It's like a chef's special. You trust the chef so you're prepared to order the dish of the day".

Andromeda was Thackrey's first commercial Pinot noir varietal, and his first wine from fruits exclusively from Marin County.

Other wines include the Taurus Cline Vineyard Mourvèdre, Sirius Eaglepoint Ranch Mendocino County Petite Sirah and the Aquila Eaglepoint Ranch Mendocino County Sangiovese. In total, his winery's output was approximately 4,000 cases (360 hl) annually.

=== Exposure ===
Despite Thackrey's fringe profile, he consistently received high scores from major critics such as Robert Parker. Although Thackrey never advertised his wines, customer demand for his wine considerably outweighed his small-scale production.

Occasionally voicing opinions contrary to conventional belief, Thackrey did not consider terroir to be the most important element in creating fine wine, having said, "I'm not saying terroir doesn't exist, there are just a lot of other things going on". Thackrey has described AVAs and appellations as a "gerrymandered marketing gimmick", and the AOCs of France as "viticultural racism". Having termed himself an agnostic about terroir, he has also stated he is agnostic about global warming, adding, "The real story is a greater willingness to deal with cooler regions. Remember that Carneros was once considered absolutely marginal. Fifty years ago, nobody would have dreamed to plant grapes there". Thackrey also believed in both artistic and scientific experimentation. "I am an enormous believer in experimental results. My own ideas about something don't interest me until I have tried them and had them work."

Thackrey's website held what was titled "The Thackrey Library", which included an extensive archive of early books and manuscripts relating to the subject of winemaking and the enjoyment of wine. Having collected ancient wine texts since 1996, the oldest document is a sixth-century papyrus receipt for grapevines written in Greek.

Thackrey's media appearances included a segment in the 2007 California season of Oz and James's Big Wine Adventure, and a documentary film titled Sean Thackrey: Pleasure Architect, as well as a recorded interview on the Barfly Podcast in 2022.

=== Vallejo warehouse fire ===
A converted military bunker warehouse at Mare Island near Vallejo, California, was set ablaze by an arsonist on October 12, 2005, resulting in a loss of nearly 4,000 cases of Thackrey's wine. Initially estimating to lose as much as $2 million, Thackrey stated, "This has a major impact on my existence. I only have just barely enough [wine] left to drink myself into the grave". 500 cases (45 hl) of Thackrey's wine were later recovered, in an event that resulted in the loss of 6 million bottles owned by 43 collectors and 92 various Napa Valley wineries, many of whom lost their entire stock.

== Personal life ==
Thackrey was in a domestic partnership with Susan Thackrey until his death from cancer in Walnut Creek on May 30, 2022.

== See also ==
- List of wine personalities
