= Eric Arnold =

American journalist and author

Eric Arnold is an American journalist and author, formerly a news editor of Wine Spectator and wine and spirits writer and lifestyle editor for Forbes.com. In 2010, Arnold joined the online wine community enterprise Bottlenotes as Editorial Director. Arnold has previously worked as a stand-up comedian.

In September 2007, Arnold published First Big Crush, an account of a year spent immersed in the wine culture of New Zealand. In September 2009, a team of New Zealand filmmakers headed by Ben Ruffell announced intentions to adapt the book into a feature film.

== See also ==
- List of wine personalities
