= Jeb Dunnuck =

American wine critic based in Colorado

- Born: June 2, 1975 (age 49); Muncie, Indiana
- Education: Computer Science, Ball State University
- Website: JebDunnuck.com

Jeb Dunnuck is an American wine critic based in Colorado. He reviews wines from the Rhône Valley (North and South), Southern France, Bordeaux, Washington, and California for his website.

== Career ==
An aerospace engineer by training, Dunnuck grew up on a farm in rural Indiana. In 1996, when living abroad and traveling through Europe, he became interested in fine wine.

Dunnuck later traveled extensively throughout the wine regions of Europe and the United States, developing a passion for the wines of the Rhône valley and the Rhone Ranger Movement in California and Washington. To gain a better understanding of the business side of the wine industry, he took a temporary wine retail position in 2006.

Dunnuck launched "The Rhône Report" publication and website in 2008 and began releasing a quarterly newsletter reviewing Rhône variety wines from around the world. Completely independent and including coverage on wines from France, Spain, Australia, and both California and Washington in the United States; by 2013, the Report was read in over 24 countries and seen as one of the leading authorities on Rhône variety wines.

In 2013, Dunnuck was approached by Robert Parker to join The Wine Advocate as a full-time reviewer. From 2013 to 2017, he reviewed wines for Parker's Wine Advocate and eRobertParker.com, the global bimonthly wine publication and website founded by Parker.

In 2017, Dunnuck left The Wine Advocate to create his own publication at JebDunnuck.com. As of 2023, he reviews the wines of numerous regions such as Southern France, the Rhône Valley, Bordeaux, California, and Washington State.

== Works ==
Dunnuck wrote the image processing software for two NASA programs. The first was the High Resolution Imaging Science Experiment (HiRISE) instrument that is currently orbiting Mars and the second is the Kepler program, which is NASA's mission to search for other habitable planets.

== Personal life ==
Dunnuck resides in Colorado with his wife and a dog. Most of his family still lives in Delaware County. His brother and sister are both local attorneys and his sister currently serves as a local judge. His father was killed in a single vehicle car crash on September 19, 2022.

== See also ==
- List of wine personalities
