= Jasper Morris =

Master of Wine since 1985 (born 1957)

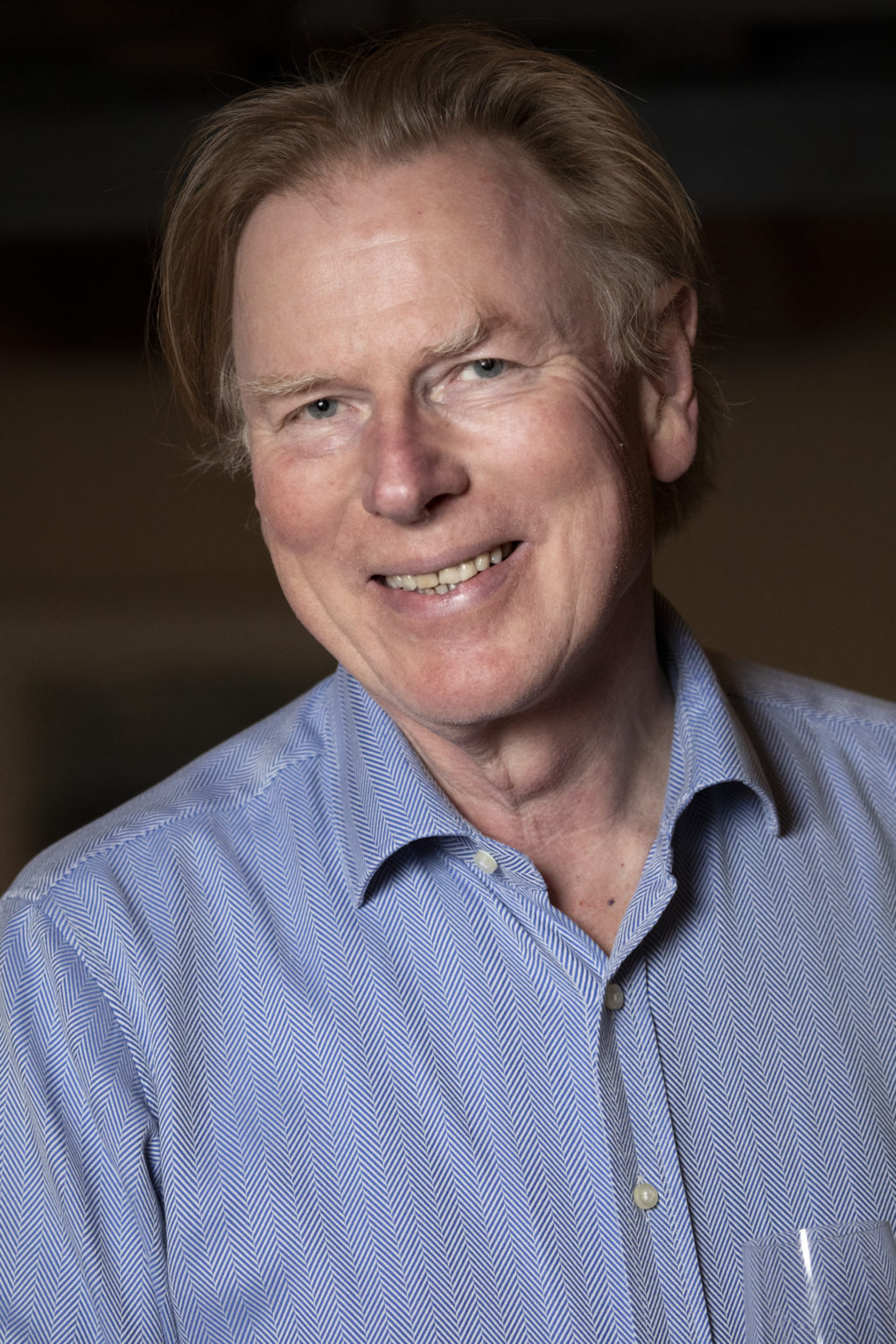
- Jasper Morris
- Born: Jasper Morris; 27 December 1957 (age 68); Basingstoke, United Kingdom
- Education: Oxford University
- Occupation: Wine critics
- Writing career
- Language: English
- Subject: Wine
- Notable awards: Master of Wine Chevalier de l’Ordre de Mérite Agricole André Simon Book Award 2010, 2021
- Website: www.insideburgundy.com

Jasper Morris (born 27 December 1957) is a Master of Wine since 1985. An expert on the wine of Burgundy, with a strong interest in other pinot-producing countries such as New Zealand, he has taken a strong interest in the nascent wine industries of China and Japan, visiting the wine regions of both countries. He has launched InsideBurgundy.com website showing all reviews and news from the wine region of Burgundy.

== Biography ==
Morris founded the successful specialist wine importers Morris & Verdin in 1981. He studied to become a Master of Wine concurrently with Jancis Robinson, MW, and with his sister Arabella Woodrow, MW, Morris achieving the accreditation in 1985 and Woodrow in 1986. Morris and Woodrow are the only pair of siblings to be Masters of Wine.

After Berry Bros. & Rudd acquired Morris & Verdin in 2003, Morris was appointed BBR buying director. In May 2008, Morris, together with colleagues at BBR, published "The Future of Wine Report", speculating on the state of the wine industry in the coming 50 years. He retired from the company in July 2017.

In 2016 Morris was appointed as Senior Consult for Christie's with responsibility for the annual Hospices de Beaune Wine Auction. Since 2021 he has continued in the same role for Sotheby's.

Morris' early book publications are White Wines of Burgundy, and The Wines of the Loire. In September 2010, Morris presented his substantial book Inside Burgundy, which won the André Simon prize, the initial launch publication of the new BBR publishing division, Berry Bros. & Rudd Press.

Having retired from commerce Jasper Morris has embarked on a new career as Burgundy expert and critic, culminating in the launch of the website Jasper Morris Inside Burgundy in September 2018. The Second edition also won the André Simon prize in 2021.

== Bibliography ==
- Morris, Jasper (1988). The White Wines of Burgundy. Hamlyn. ISBN 978-0706431988.
- Morris, Jasper (1989). The Wines of The Loire. Mitchell Beazley. ISBN 978-0600567479.
- Morris, Jasper (2010). Inside Burgundy. Berry Bros & Rudd Press. ISBN 978-0951063217.
- Morris, Jasper (2022). Inside Burgundy 2. Berry Bros & Rudd Press. ISBN 978-0-9510632-4-8.

== Awards and recognition ==
- 1985 - Master of Wine
- 2005 - Chevalier de l’Ordre de Mérite Agricole
- 2010, 2022 - André Simon Book Award

== See also ==
- List of wine personalities
