= Max Léglise =

French oenologist

Max Léglise (1924–1996) was a French oenologist. Most of his career was spent working at the Station œnologique de Bourgogne (INRA, Beaune), where he entered in 1948, and that he directed from 1962 to 1984.

Departing from the dominant conventional œnology that he practiced at the beginning of his career, he developed biological methods to be applied to vinification. He was also one of the initiators of sensory analysis and was therefore well regarded by fellow oenologists, wine merchants, and restaurateurs.

== Selected publications ==
- Une initiation à la dégustation des grands vins (1976)
- Les méthodes biologiques appliquées à la vinification & à l'oenologie (2 volumes)
- La vigne et le vin entre Ciel et Terre (text of a conference held in 1990)

== See also ==
- List of wine personalities
