= Doug Frost (wine) =

American Master of Wine and Master Sommelier

Doug Frost is an American Master of Wine, and Master Sommelier as well as an author and wine consultant based in Kansas City, Missouri.

Frost is one of four individuals in the world to simultaneously hold the Master of Wine and Master Sommelier titles, along with Gerard Basset, Ronn Wiegand and Eric Hemer, achieving his MS in 1991 and MW in 1993.

Frost is a wine and spirits consultant for United Airlines, and is published in several works and periodicals, including The Oxford Companion to Wine, Tom Stevenson's Wine Report, San Francisco Chronicle and Wine & Spirits. His published books are Uncorking Wine (1996), On Wine (2001) and Far From Ordinary Spanish Wine Buying Guide (2005). Frost also hosts the show Check Please Kansas City for KC Public Television.

== See also ==
- List of wine personalities
