= Ricky Schraub =

American poet

Richard “Ricky” Schraub (1947 – May 5, 1993) was an American poet, journalist, and wine critic.

Ricky Schraub in 1982.

== Early life ==
Born in St. Louis, Schraub moved with his family to Orange County, California, when he was a child, after his father, a World War II vet, was hired by the defense contractor Swedlow Engineering. He later described his childhood as “smooth on the surface, but rocky underneath, like a wild and wooly coastline,” because his father became an alcoholic and began to abuse his family verbally and sometimes physically. Despite this, Schraub was able to win a track scholarship to attend UC Santa Barbara, where he majored in English. Unfortunately, after suffering a serious knee injury while playing touch-football on the beach with friends, he was forced to give up his scholarship and soon withdrew from school. In the spring of 1967 he hitchhiked to San Francisco “chasing after an old girlfriend” and promptly fell in with the thriving countercultural scene there, reading his own poetry and performing experimental one-man plays while earning money from a series of odd jobs, including, as he vividly described in a later essay (“A Tuxedo Does Not Entitle You To Piss on the Floor”), a six-month stint cleaning the bathrooms of the San Francisco Opera.

== Wine criticism ==
By the early 1970s he had moved to Napa, California, with Susan Parker, a fellow member of the Bay Area counterculture whom he had met at a concert and soon married. In Napa he worked as a field hand and repairman at a number of wineries while continuing to write poetry, little of which was published. Through a college friend, he was eventually offered a job as the first wine critic for the Berkeley Barb. Unashamedly imitating the brash “gonzo” style of journalism pioneered several years earlier by Hunter S. Thompson, Schraub won a small but devoted following among the burgeoning California wine trade for his straightforward, often vividly emotional reactions to local wines punctuated with tales of his own assorted day jobs at wineries, usually highlighting unpleasant or amusing interactions with vineyard owners. He occasionally wrote pieces for the Barb on non-wine topics, including an early exposé of the shoe company Nike (“This Man Wants You to Wear Waffles on Your Feet”) and a series of humorous vignettes about the 1978 California congressional races. However, when the Barb ran into financial problems at the end of the decade, Schraub was let go, and he struggled to find outlets for either his journalism or his poetry, which he had continued to write on the side.

== Final years and death ==
Ricky and Susan had lived apart for many years (she moved to LA and he stayed in Napa) and finally got divorced in 1982, which friends believe also led to his declaring bankruptcy in 1984 and moving to a run-down house in Sonoma County without electricity or running water. In September 1985 he was indicted and subsequently convicted on federal charges after his luggage was intercepted at San Francisco Airport on a flight from Mexico with nearly two kilos of cocaine hidden in the lining. By cooperating with authorities and agreeing to participate in a pilot prison-based drug rehabilitation program, he was able to have his sentence reduced. Just months after being released on parole in fall 1991, Schraub was diagnosed with advanced liver cancer. Late in the evening of May 5, 1993 he died in a single-car accident on Route 121 in Carneros, California, less than an hour after what witnesses described as a highly emotional confrontation with his ex-wife and her new family at a local restaurant. However, friends think he may have been disoriented because of the many medications he was given for his cancer, because he had complained about bad side effects in the weeks prior to his death.

== Fun Run ==
From 1995 to 2001 an annual charity run in his memory (“The Ricky Schraub Shuffle for Liver Cancer”) was organized in Napa by a group of friends. However, financial setbacks after the September 11 attacks caused the non-profit that sponsored the event to close down, and while there has occasionally been some discussion of reviving it, as of 2013 this has not come to pass. This is because Doug Lewis, one of Ricky's best friends and the main force behind the charity run, died in 2008.
