= Steve Heimoff =

American wine critic

Steve Heimoff is an American wine writer and former wine critic and California wine expert. He was the West Coast Editor for Wine Enthusiast Magazine from 1994 until 2014, and previously from 1989 to 1994 a contributor to Wine Spectator.

In 2014, he left his job at Wine Enthusiast to take a PR and education position with Jackson Family Wines, maker of the Kendall-Jackson range of wines.

In an open letter to the San Francisco Chronicle, Heimoff warned fellow critic James Laube of Wine Spectator that due to his position as a critic in a prominent magazine, he should be more cautious about branding wines as being tainted when most wine drinkers do not have the same level of sensitivity to detect anything wrong with those wines.

Heimoff has published the books A Wine Journey along the Russian River, released in 2005, and New Classic Winemakers of California: Conversations with Steve Heimoff in 2007.

== See also ==
- List of wine personalities
