= Gerhard Eichelmann =

German wine critic

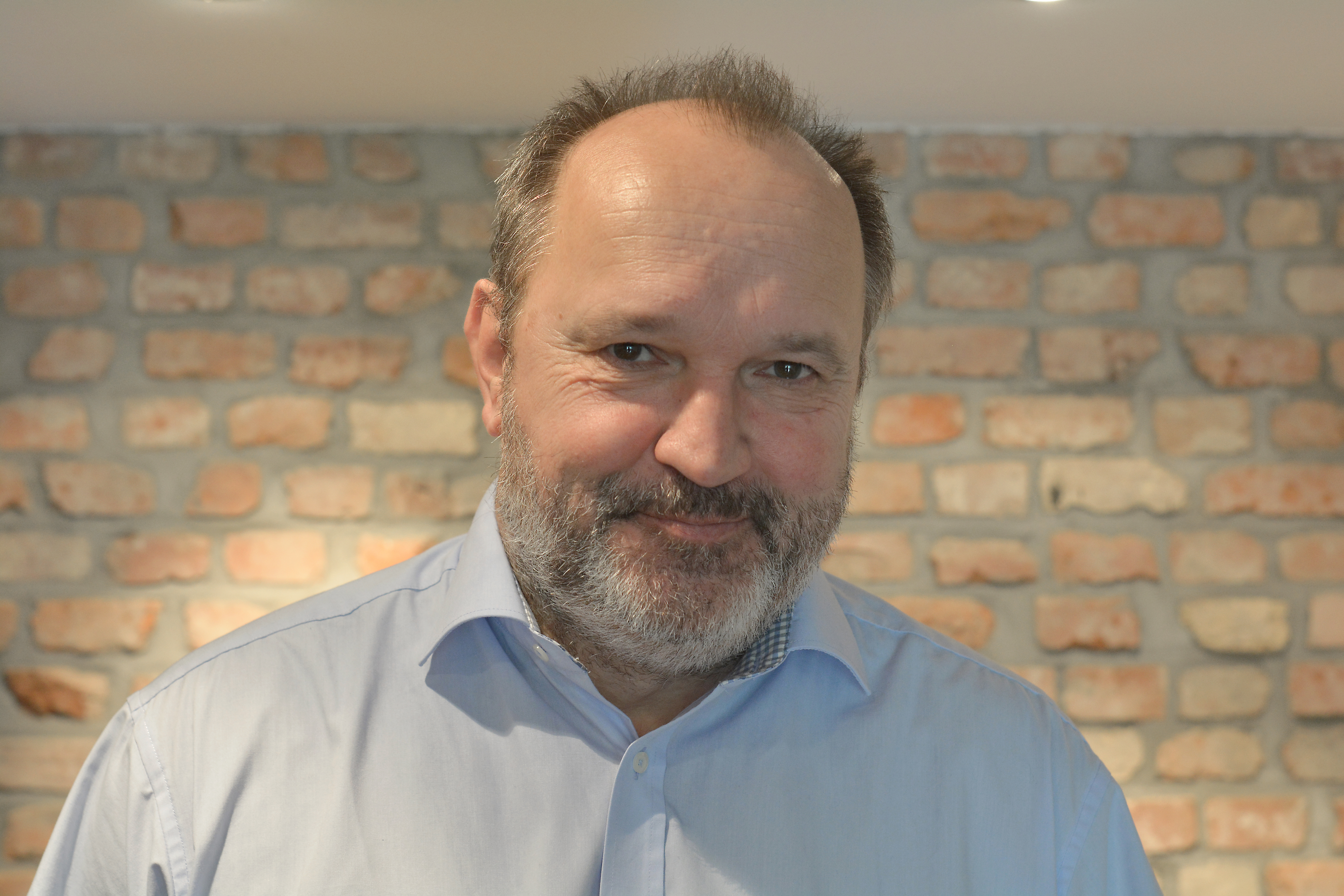
- Born: 1962 (age 63–64); Bavaria, West Germany
- Occupation: Wine critic
- Writing career
- Subject: Wine

Gerhard Eichelmann (born in 1962) is a leading German wine critic with an international influence on German wine.

== Biography ==
Eichelmann was born to a family of part-time wine growers in the German wine region of Franconia. He was educated at the universities of Göttingen, Paris and Würzburg and trained in economics. Subsequently he worked for twelve years as management consultant, but changed career, in 1997, at the age of thirty-five, and founded a publishing house in Heidelberg, specialized in literature on wine.

He resigned to devote his full attention to writing about wine, which led him to taste a great number of wines in Germany. In 1997, Eichelmann began writing a wine periodical in paperback format called Mondo, which was published every second month, later quarterly. The wine guides, which are advertising-free and available by subscription only, had reached their 62nd issue at the end of 2011 with a special issue on Champagner, Sekt, Cava, Franciacorta, Crémant & Co (Champagne, sparkling wine, Cava, Franciacorta, Crémant) .

In the year 2000 the first issue of the book Eichelmann Deutschlands Weine (Eichelmann Germany's wines) was published, it describes itself as an independent reference work and is issued annually in an updated edition. The first five editions were published by “Gräfe und Unzer” Publishing. “The Eichelmann” as it is referred to briefly in professional circles, had its publication taken over by Mondo-Verlag, Heidelberg, starting in 2005.

In this wine guide Eichelmann describes 935 German wineries, in detail according to their relevance, and evaluates the overall performance of the particular winery during the last three years. He employs a system that awards a winery up to five stars, where 5 stars indicate “world class, top international producers”. For the 9772 individual evaluations of the wines (as of the 2012 edition), Eichelmann tastes thousands of new wines every year.

The wines are assessed using a 50-100 point scale rating system. In each issue a “rising star of the year” is named. Additionally the best collections of red wines, white wines and edelsüß (sweet) wines are highlighted. Mondo claims that 30,000 copies “Eichelmann 2020 Deutschlands Weine” had been printed. Since 2003, Eichelmann Mondo Publishing released the Mondo Weinbibliothek (wine library), and since 2005, the paperback series Mondo Kompakt that turns to selected wine topics.

Eichelmann has been a contributing editor for popular newspapers e.g. Welt am Sonntag and Rhein-Neckar-Zeitung (Heidelberg).

== Bibliography ==
- Eichelmann, Gerhard (2019). Eichelmann Deutschlands Weine (20th ed.). Mondo Verlag. ISBN 978-3938839515.

== See also ==
- List of wine personalities
- List of celebrities who own wineries and vineyards
