= Frank J. Prial =

American journalist (1930–2012)

- Born: Francis Joseph Prial; November 4, 1930; Newark, New Jersey, US
- Died: November 6, 2012 (aged 82); West Orange, New Jersey, US
- Occupations: Journalist, The New York Times wine columnist, author
- Spouse: Jeanne S. Prial
- Children: 3

Francis Joseph Prial (November 4, 1930 – November 6, 2012) was a journalist and author, and the wine columnist for The New York Times for 25 years, writing the weekly "Wine Talk" column largely since 1972 until his retirement in 2004.

== Career ==
Prial graduated from Georgetown University in 1951 followed by service in the Coast Guard during the Korean War. He worked for since discontinued newspapers the Newark Evening News and New York World-Telegram before he found work as a feature writer with The Wall Street Journal. He joined The New York Times as a reporter in 1970. The column "Wine Talk" was started in 1972, written between news assignments that would range from coverage of building fires to the U.N. Security Council. The wine column was included in the "Living" section of The New York Times in 1977, and was printed two Sundays a month in The New York Times Magazine. The column was temporarily discontinued in 1979 when Prial began work as The Times' Paris correspondent, and it did not resume until 1984.

The writing of Prial was intended to illuminate rather than obfuscate with that “peculiar subgenre of the English language” which the writer termed “winespeak”. Prial stated that a person “should not have to be a budding enologist to enjoy reading about wine.” Believing that what is in the bottle is much more important than what is on the wine label, Prial observed that "Shorn of their carefully constructed mystiques, their beautiful labels and clever marketing, many expensive wines are really not that much superior to their less expensive rivals." Prial believed that "there’s enjoyment to be had of a glass of wine without making a fetish of it or paying a lot for it." In addition to being described as unpretentious, Prial was widely regarded as a classic newspaperman.

Prial was the co-editor of The Companion to Wine (1992), the author of the column compilation books Wine Talk (1978) and Decantations (2001), and his writing featured prominently in The New York Times Book of Wine (2012). He was inducted into the Wine Media Guild hall of fame in 2007, and accepted a membership in the Légion d’Honneur from the French government.

Prial died on November 6, 2012, in West Orange, New Jersey, at 82 years old, due to complications of prostate cancer.

== See also ==
- List of wine personalities
