= Karen MacNeil =

American author, journalist, wine educator and consultant

- Born: 1954 (age 71–72); United States
- Occupations: speaker, author, wine expert, consultant
- Awards: James Beard Award; Emmy Award

Karen MacNeil (born 1954) is an American speaker, author, wine expert, and consultant.

== Career ==
After moving to New York City at the age of 19 to become a writer, MacNeil published her first article, on the subject of the best artisanal butter on offer in New York, in The Village Voice. She transitioned to writing about wine as well as food in the mid-1970s, when she was commissioned by Elle magazine, Mirabella, Travel & Leisure, and other magazines to write about wine. She became the first wine and food editor of USA Today in the early 1980s. She also began appearing regularly on NBC's The Today Show where she did segments on food and wine. And she hosted her own radio talk show called Living Well in New York on WMCA Radio. In 1991, Peter Workman of Workman Publishing Company read a food article she had published in The New York Times Magazine section and commissioned her to write a book, The Wine Bible, which was released in 2001. The second edition of The Wine Bible came out in 2015 and the third edition in 2022. As of 2023, The Wine Bible had sold close to one million copies worldwide. The Wall Street Journal, The Washington Post, and The New York Times have all praised The Wine Bible as one of the best wine books. The Wine Bible was also featured in the Netflix series Uncorked and the Starz series Sweetbitter in Season 1 Episode 4, titled “Simone’s.” Her second book was Wine, Food & Friends (2006), and she was the host of a 13-episode PBS series titled Wine, Food and Friends with Karen MacNeil (in tandem with the book), for which she won an Emmy.

MacNeil was the creator of and is now Chairman Emerita of the Rudd Center for Professional Wine Studies at the Culinary Institute of America at Greystone in St. Helena, California. She also writes an online wine newsletter called WineSpeed. During the COVID-19 pandemic, she began a series of virtual wine tastings via Zoom sessions for her clients.

MacNeil has won numerous wine awards, including the James Beard award for Wine and Spirits Professional of the Year, the Louis Roederer award for Best Consumer Wine Writing, and the International Wine and Spirits award as the Global Wine Communicator of the Year. In a full-page profile on her, TIME Magazine called MacNeil “America’s Missionary of the Vine.”

MacNeil conducts private wine events for companies around the world, including law firms, private equity firms, insurance companies, and luxury goods companies. In 2024, MacNeil created the international campaign Come Over October, devoted to telling the story of wine's positive role in society and culture. By 2025, Come Over October and its sister campaign Share & Pair Sundays had reached 2 billion UVMs.

MacNeil is based in Napa Valley.

== See also ==
- List of wine personalities
- Jancis Robinson
