= Natalie MacLean =

Canadian wine writer

Natalie MacLean is a Canadian author focusing on wines.

== Career ==
In addition to her work published in the books Red, White, and Drunk All Over (2006) and Unquenchable (2011) in her e-newsletters and on her website, MacLean's writing has been included in publications such as Epicurious, The Guardian, The Age, The Huffington Post, BusinessWeek, Chicago Tribune, and Ottawa Citizen.

MacLean's website membership has been estimated at over 145,000 subscribers. Among her awards are the Louis Roederer 2009 Online Wine Writer of the Year and the Jacob's Creek Awards 2003 World's Best Drink Writer.
