= Wine & Spirit =

British magazine

- Editor: David Williams
- Categories: Wine magazines
- Frequency: Monthly
- First issue: February 2006
- Final issue: 2009
- Company: William Reed Business Media Ltd
- Country: United Kingdom
- Language: English
- ISSN: 0264-4797

Wine & Spirit was a British monthly magazine on wine, spirits, beers and cocktails, directed at both consumers and the drinks industry. The magazine also organized the annual "International Wine Challenge" and "International Spirits Challenge", and published the annual results book, the World's Best Wines Guide.

Wine & Spirit was viewed as a competitor of Decanter, described by Jancis Robinson as "Britain's second consumer wine magazine", though livelier.

== History ==
The magazine was a consumer-only oriented magazine founded as What Wine? in 1983 by Robert Joseph and Charles Metcalfe and published by Wilmington plc. It was later renamed Wine Magazine, then Wine International, before it was sold with its sister trade-only publication Wine & Spirit (a 150-year-old trade publication where Jancis Robinson began her wine writing career as editor immediately after university) to William Reed Publishing in December 2005.

The two magazines were combined into one, Wine & Spirit International, in February 2006.

In 2008, William Reed acquired Harpers Magazine. Wine & Spirit International and Harpers merged in 2009 to form Harpers, Wine & Spirit Trades Review.

== See also ==
- List of food and drink magazines
