= Hans Denk =

Austrian priest and wine expert (1942–2019)

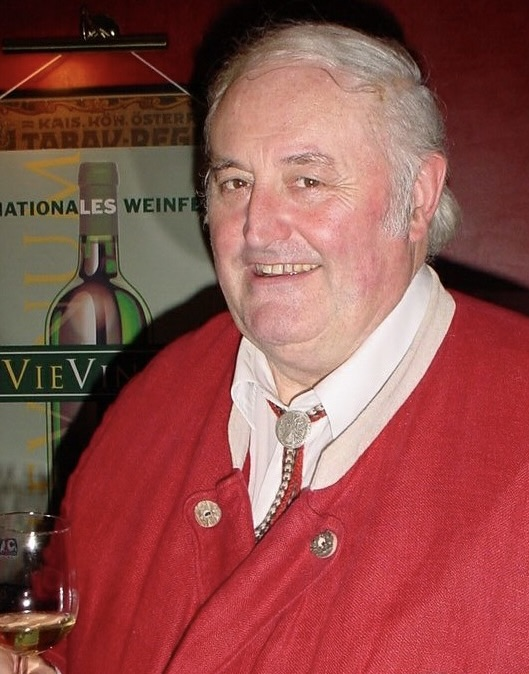
Hans Denk in 2002

Hans Denk (15 May 1942 – 21 April 2019) was an Austrian Roman Catholic priest and wine expert who became famous for inventing the Denk'Art wine glasses.

== Early life ==
Denk was the son of a farmer in Niedergrünbach in the Waldviertel region of Austria. He studied theology and was ordained a priest on 29 June 1965. In 1980, he became pastor in the parish of Albrechtsberg, where he worked until his retirement in 2014.

Denk gained nationwide recognition as a wine expert and was considered one of the most influential figures in Austrian wine. He was nicknamed the "wine priest" due to his exceptional sensory abilities, consistently achieving high accuracy in blind tastings. In particular, during tastings of wines from the Wachau region, he frequently identified not only the grape variety, vintage, and winemaker but also the specific vineyard.

Following a fall, Denk began using a wheelchair and spent his final years at the Haus St. Elisabeth nursing home on the outskirts of St. Pölten. He died on 21 April 2019 after a brief illness. He is buried in the cemetery in Albrechtsberg.

== Development and success of the Zalto-Denk'Art wine glasses ==
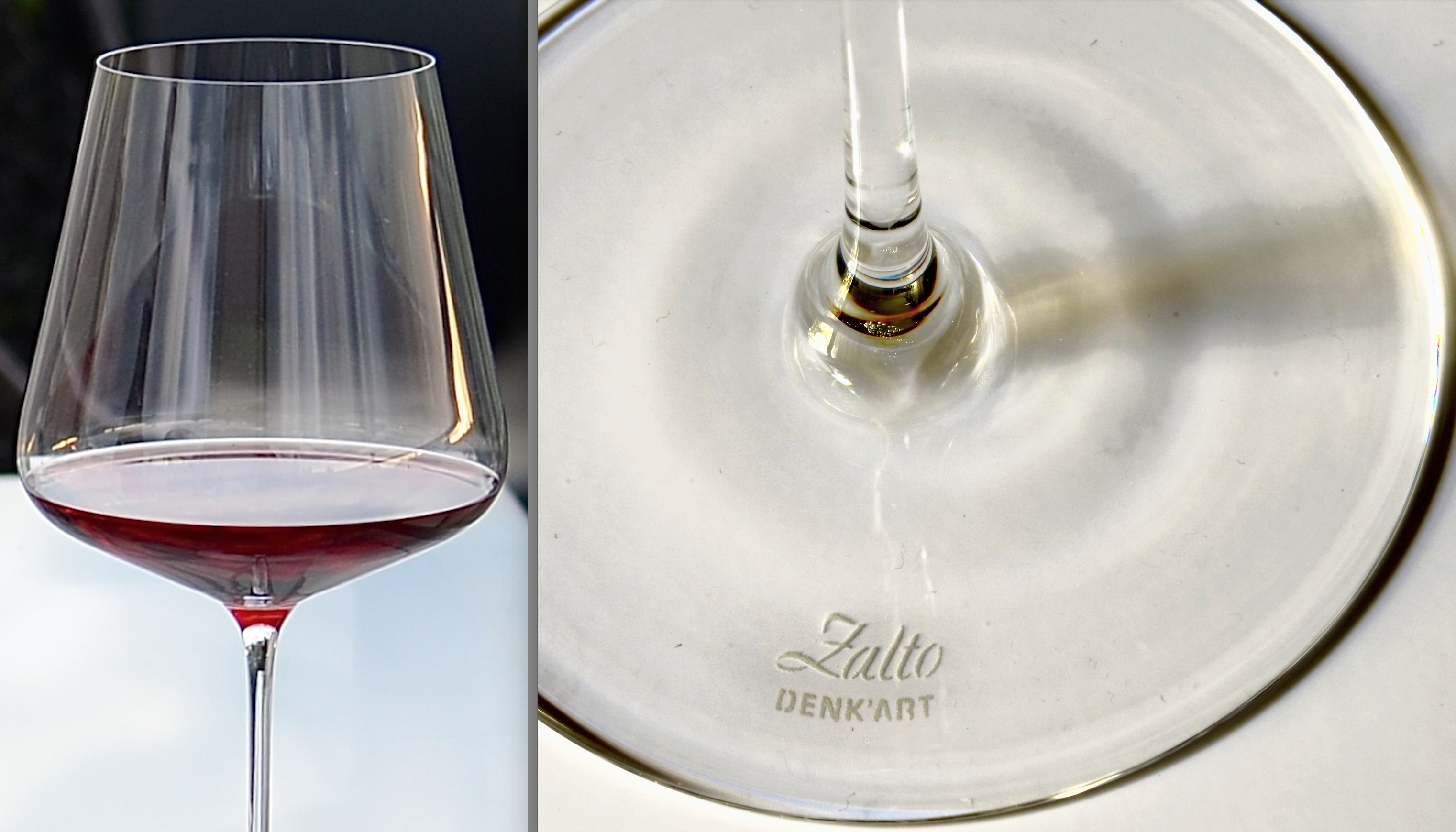
Photo of a Zalto-Denk'Art glass.

In 2001, Hans Denk launched a project to develop a sensory-optimized wine glass series. In 2004, the Zalto-Denk'Art glasses designed as part of this cooperation were launched. The six-piece wine glass series bears special features in shape and feel. The curvature between the stem and the widest point corresponds to the angle of inclination of the Earth in its orbit around the sun. The mouth-blown and handmade glasses are particularly light and thin-walled. International wine experts such as the U.S. wine critic Robert Parker, the British wine critic Jancis Robinson, New York Times wine critic Eric Asimov, British wine expert Andrew Jefford and German wine journalist Jens Priewe spoke well of the wine glass design. In 2016, the Wall Street Journal named Denk'Art glasses as one of the six design pieces that were reportedly perfect.
