= John Livingstone-Learmonth =

British wine writer

John Livingstone-Learmonth is a British wine writer. He has published four books on Rhône wines and has consulted on books such as the 'World Atlas of Wine' by Jancis Robinson and Hugh Johnson.

His books include: The Wines of the Northern Rhône (2005), and Gigondas: Ses Vins, Sa Terre, Ses Hommes (2012). His work is regularly featured in Decanter, the British wine magazine.
