= Robert Joseph (wine connoisseur) =

British wine expert

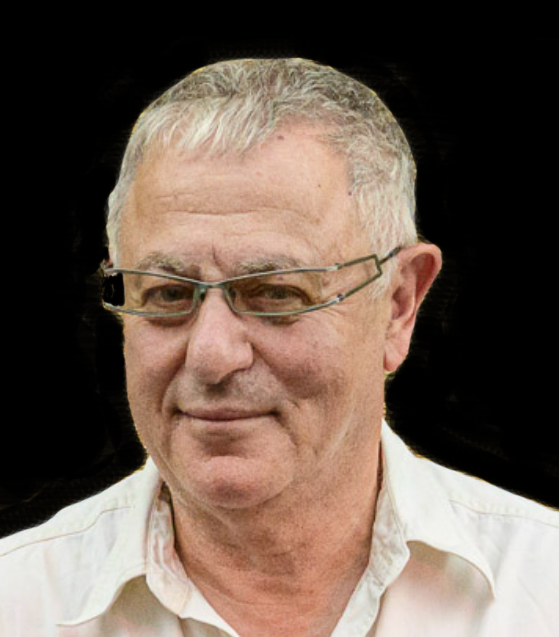
Robert Joseph

Robert Joseph who was born in London in 1955, is a British wine expert, consultant, producer and industry analyst. In 1984, with Charles Metcalfe, he launched the magazine Wine International and the London International Wine Challenge. Joseph also launched International Wine Challenges in Asia (China, Japan, Vietnam, Singapore, Hong Kong, India) and Russia. He resigned as chairman of the International Wine Challenge in January 2006.

== Biography ==
Joseph was the wine correspondent of the Sunday Telegraph for sixteen years, until 2001, and is the author of more than 28 books, twice winning the Glenfiddich award for wine writing. He wrote an annual Robert Joseph Good Wine Guide (published by Dorling Kindersley) which in 2004 was named as best Wine Guide in the world by the Gourmand World Cookbook Awards. He has judged and/or chaired wine competitions in France, Portugal, Italy, Switzerland, Australia, New Zealand, South Africa, Chile, Portugal and the USA. He has been one of the members of the Grand Jury Européen, a Chevalier de Tastevin and a member of the Commanderie du Bontemps du Médoc et des Graves in Bordeaux. In 2006, he helped to launch Meininger's Wine Business International magazine - now known as Meininger's International After initially working as editor at large, he became associate editor in 2022 and writes a weekly online column.

Robert Joseph regularly appears on television and radio in the UK and overseas to talk about wine. He is also a keynote public speaker at international wine trade conferences and events and hosts regular tastings for private groups.

In 2005, Joseph gave up being a wine critic and, with former 'flying winemaker', Hugh Ryman and award-winning label-designer, Kevin Shaw, launched a wine brand in the Minervois region of Southern France called le Grand Noir with the aim of creating a range of French wines to compete with successful New World brands. There are now 15 wines selling nearly 3.8m bottles in 65 countries. A separate organic brand called Greener Planet was launched in 2008.

The le Grand Noir Chardonnay-Viognier was chosen to be listed by Gordon Ramsey's Savoy Grill in London in 2018/19 and the 2015 Minervois Reserve was named a Top 100 wine from the Sud de France

In January 2024, in Utrecht, Netherlands, he launched a Georgian wine called K'AVSHIRI, in association with Vladimer Kublashvili of Winery Khareba.

As a strategic/marketing consultant, Joseph has worked for companies/organisations including Accolade wines, Concha y Toro, Torres, Origin Wines and the generic promotional bodies for Australia, Portugal, Brazil, Georgia and Moldova.

In 2019, he won the inaugural Born Digital / Vinventions Innovation Award

His next book, Wine Thinking, a collection of pieces written for Meininger's since 2006, with up-to-date commentary is to be published in 2024. Another book, called The Road to K'AVSHIRI and SHA'ORI, a Personal Impression of the Last 50 Years of the Wine Industry will also be published in 2024.

== See also ==
- List of wine personalities

== Bibliography ==
- White Wines of France, 1987. Salamander;, ISBN 089586863-6
- Art of the Wine Guide, 1988. Chartwell;, ISBN 9780-88665740-6
- Sunday Telegraph Good Wine Guide 1989, 1988. Pan Macmillan;, ISBN 07894-3528-4
- Essential Guide to Wine, 1989. Joseph Stevenson;, ISBN 978-1873143001
- Sunday Telegraph Good Wine Guide 1990, 1989. Pan Macmillan;, ISBN 978-033031283-7
- Wines of the Americas, 1990. Salamander;, ISBN 9780861015399
- Sunday Telegraph Good Wine Guide 1991, 1990. Pan Macmillan;, ISBN 978075132978-0
- Sunday Telegraph Good Wine Guide 1992, 1991. Pan Macmillan;, ISBN 978-033031627-9
- Sunday Telegraph Good Wine Guide 1993, 1992. Pan Macmillan;, ISBN 978-033032545-5
- Sunday Telegraph Good Wine Guide 1994, 1993. Pan Macmillan;, ISBN 978-033033182-1
- Sunday Telegraph Good Wine Guide 1995, 1994. Pan Macmillan;, ISBN 978-033361876-9
- Good Wine Guide 1996, 1995. Pan Macmillan;, ISBN 978-033363827-9
- Good Wine Guide 1998, 1997. DK ADULT;, ISBN 978-075130460-2
- Good Wine Guide 1999, 1998. DK ADULT;, ISBN 978075130616-3
- Good Wine Guide 2000, 1999. DK ADULT;, ISBN 978078944637-4
- Good Wine Guide 2001, 2000. DK ADULT;, ISBN 978078944637-4
- Good Wine Guide 2002, 2001. DK ADULT;, ISBN 978078948029-3
- Good Wine Guide 2003, 2002. DK ADULT;, ISBN 978075132978-0
- Bordeaux and its Wines, 2004. Duncan Baird, ISBN 1-904292-72-0
- French Wines, 2005. Dorling Kindersley, ISBN 1-4053-1212-2
- The Complete Encyclopedia of Wine, 2006. Carlton, ISBN 1-84442-108-2
- The Wine Travel Guide to the World, 2006. Footprint, ISBN 978-1-904777-85-4
