= Harpers Wine & Spirit =

British wine and spirit industry magazine

Harpers Wine & Spirit Trade Review
- Cover of the November 2024 issue
- Editor in Chief: Andrew Catchpole
- Art Director: Christine Freeman
- Categories: Trade magazine
- Frequency: Monthly
- Founded: 1878
- Company: Agile Media
- Country: United Kingdom
- Based in: Burgess Hill, West Sussex
- Language: English
- Website: harpers.co.uk
- ISSN: 2040-395X

Harpers Wine & Spirit Trade Review or simply Harpers is a British information service for the wine and spirit industry.

== History ==
Harpers Wine & Spirit Trade Review was founded in 1878.

In 2009, Wine & Spirit merged into Harpers Magazine to form Harpers Wine & Spirit Trade Review. The magazine was subject to a major re-launch in 2013 with a revamped digital offering which now provides news and analysis in advance of the print magazine. Current owner Agile Media acquired Harpers Wine & Spirit Trade Review from William Reed Business Media in 2015.

== Description ==
Harpers Wine & Spirit Trade Review has a fully subscribed circulation. The current editor is Andrew Catchpole.
