= Marie-Thérèse Chappaz =

Swiss winemaker

- Born: Marie-Thérèse Chappaz; 1960 (age 65–66)
- Education: Engineering School of Changins
- Occupation: Winemaker

Marie-Thérèse Chappaz (born 1960) is a Swiss winemaker best known for her dessert wines. Her vineyards are located in Fully (Valais) and cover an area 8 ha which are organically farmed. She is a member and founder of Les Artisanes de la Vigne et du Vin.

In 2015, Gault Millau declared Chappaz an "icon of Swiss wine" and she was shortly after named "Lady of Wine" at the Villa d’Este Wine Symposium.

== Early life ==
Born in 1960, as the daughter of a poet and writer, Chappaz initially considered a career as a midwife. In 1977, however, she received a vineyard parcel from her father. This led her to study winemaking at the École d'ingénieurs de Changins (Engineering School of Changins) and work as an apprentice. In 1987, she took over her father's vineyards and produced her first millésime in 1988.

== Wine making ==
Marie-Thérèse Chappaz is said to have a dedication to making "honest, sincere yet complex wines.". A wine critique ranked one of her sweet wines with 99 Points out of 100. Today she grows wines on 11 hectares with biodynamic methods. She has a webpage, where she explains her wines and grapes.
