= Wine & Spirit Education Trust =

International wine organization

- Formation: 1969
- Headquarters: London, United Kingdom
- Region served: Worldwide
- CEO: Michelle Brampton
- Chairman of Trustees: Simon McMurtrie
- Website: www.wsetglobal.com

The Wine & Spirit Education Trust, often referred to as WSET, is a global organization which arranges courses and exams in the fields of wine, spirits, beer, and sake. WSET was founded in 1969, is headquartered in London and is generally regarded as one of the world's leading providers of drinks education. In 2016, it opened its first international office, WSET Asia Pacific, in Hong Kong in response to high demand for drinks education across Greater China. In 2018, it opened WSET Americas in Hartford, CT, USA.

== History ==
WSET grew out of the Wine and Spirit Trade Association Education Committee and was set up with the financial assistance of the Worshipful Company of Vintners. The management of the WSET reports to a board of trustees made up of 8 members: three from The Worshipful Company of Vintners, three from the Wine and Spirit Trade Association, one from the Worshipful Company of Distillers and one from the Institute of Masters of Wine.

Michelle Brampton took the reins as CEO from Ian Harris in February 2022.

== Courses ==
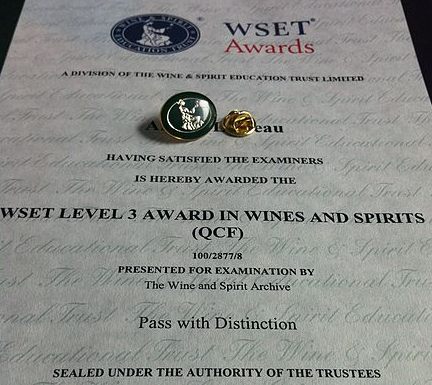
Award certification letter and pin for completion of the Level 3 program in Wine & Spirits.

The courses given by WSET were originally intended for people in the wine & spirit trade. The WSET programmes have increasingly been attended also by non-professional connoisseurs. The WSET offers professional certification in more than 70 countries worldwide, the courses are delivered by Approved Programme Providers.

=== WSET Awards in Wines ===
- Level 1 Award in Wines
- Level 2 Award in Wines
- Level 3 Award in Wines
- Level 4 Diploma in Wines

In the past 50 years, there have been over 10,000 WSET Level 4 Diploma graduates. Those who successfully complete the Diploma are able to use the post-nominal “DipWSET” after their name.

=== WSET Awards in Spirits ===
- Level 1 Award in Spirits
- Level 2 Award in Spirits
- Level 3 Award in Spirits

=== WSET Awards in Sake ===
- Level 1 Award in Sake
- Level 2 Award in Sake
- Level 3 Award in Sake

=== WSET Awards in Beer ===
- Level 1 Award in Beer
- Level 2 Award in Beer

== Notable alumni ==
Notable DipWSETs include:

- Gerard Basset
- Jancis Robinson
- Jasper Morris
- Lisa Perotti-Brown

== See also ==
- Court of Master Sommeliers
- Master of Wine
