= Decanter (magazine) =

English wine magazine

- Cover of the August 2024 issue
- Editor: Chris Maillard
- Categories: Wine magazines
- Frequency: Monthly
- Circulation: 40,000
- Publisher: Future plc
- Founded: 1975
- Country: United Kingdom, United States
- Language: English
- Website: www.decanter.com

Decanter is a wine and wine-lifestyle media brand owned by Future plc. It includes a print and digital magazine, fine wine tasting events, a news website, a subscription website – Decanter Premium, and the Decanter World Wine Awards. The magazine, published in about 90 countries on a monthly basis, includes industry news, vintage guides and wine and spirits recommendations.

== History and profile ==
Following the success of wine columns in British newspapers, the Decanter magazine was founded in London in 1975. Decanter is the oldest consumer wine publication in the United Kingdom. According to author Evelyne Resnick, it has a comparable function in the UK as the Wine Spectator has in the United States. As of 2011, it was published in 91 countries, including China. Columnists and regular contributors include several Masters of Wine.

The magazine focuses mainly on wines available in the United Kingdom, as well as the United States. While it is aimed at consumers, a significant part of the magazine's audience consists both of traders and producers. Its contents include news, topical commentary, travel surveys, interviews, analysis and market reports. Unlike other magazines, which focus on many wines from various regions and countries, Decanter issues offer in-depth reviews of wines from two regions at a time. The readers of Decanter are generally younger than the readers of similar publications, with 41% of readers under 45 years of age.

Decanter launched its website, Decanter.com, in 1999. The website is one of the largest globally, based on traffic figures. In 2017 it launched a subscription service called Decanter Premium.

== US Growth ==
Decanter saw significant growth in the US wine market between the years of 2023 and 2026. The magazine had appointed Clive Pursehouse, to serve as the US and North American Editor. Vintage reports expanded beyond Napa Valley for the first time, covering large wine regions like Sonoma County, Washington State, Oregon's Willamette Valley and smaller regions like Anderson Valley, the Santa Crus Mountains and Canada's Okanagan Valley.

In 2024 Decanter published its first ever "Top List" a common practice in wine media. Their Top 50 US Wines of 2024 and 2025 were chosen by the North American editor and contributed significantly to the brand's recognition with the US industry and consumer base.
