= Conterno =

Conterno may refer to:

- Giacomo Conterno, Italian wine producer of Piedmont
- Poderi Aldo Conterno, Italian wine producer of Piedmont
- Conterno Fantino, Italian wine producer of Piedmont

== People with the surname ==
- Angelo Conterno (1925–2007), Italian professional road racing cyclist
- Giovanni Conterno (1929–2004), previous proprietor and winemaker of Giacomo Conterno
- Roberto Conterno, modern era proprietor and winemaker of Giacomo Conterno
