= Mazzella =

Mazzella may refer to:

== People ==
- Camillo Mazzella (1833–1900), Italian Jesuit theologian and cardinal
- Frédéric Mazzella (born 1976), French entrepreneur
- Gian Luca Mazzella, Italian journalist, wine and food critic
- Kavisha Mazzella (born 1959), Australian multi-instrumental musician, activist and painter
- Luigi Mazzella (born 1932), Italian politician

== Places ==
- Mazzella Field, a soccer stadium in New Rochelle, New York, USA
- Cava Mazzella, a natural cave on the island of Palmarola, Italy

== Other uses ==
- SS Dea Mazzella (1942), the cargo ship also called SS Empire Driver
