= Case Basse di Gianfranco Soldera =

Italian wine producer

Coordinates: 43.0151109°N 11.449172°E

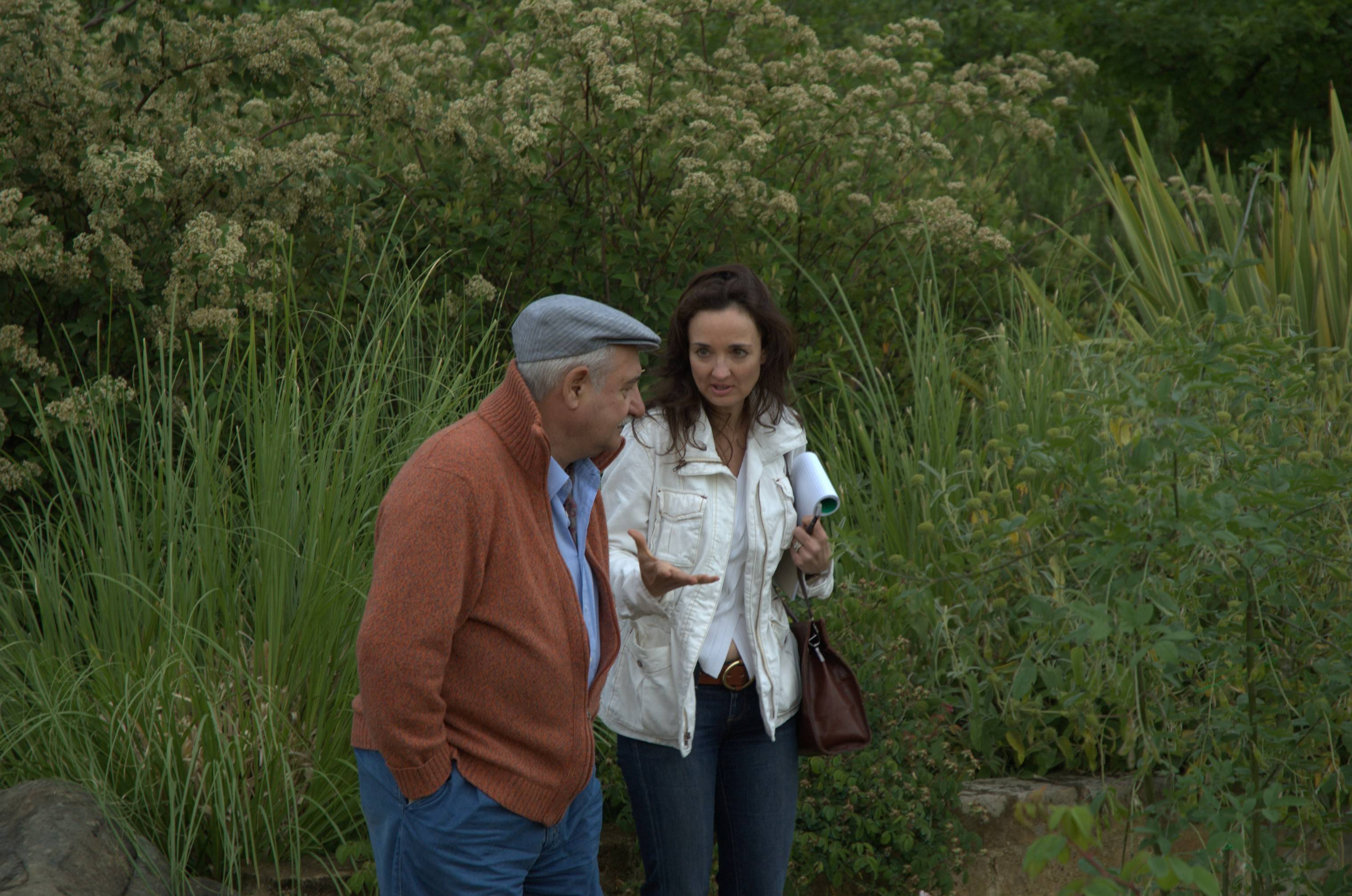
Gianfranco Soldera (*Treviso 1937, +16 February 2019) with wine critic and author Kerin O'Keefe

Azienda Agricola Case Basse di Gianfranco Soldera, commonly referred to as Case Basse or Soldera, is an Italian wine producer located in Montalcino, Tuscany, producing highly priced wine declared under DOCG Brunello di Montalcino. It was owned by Gianfranco Soldera from 1972 until his death on February 16, 2019, at age 82.

== History ==
Gianfranco Soldera, a former insurance broker from Milan, bought the Case Basse property in 1972, at the time in a run-down state, with an aim to produce exceptional Brunello. He retained the sangiovese expert Giulio Gambelli as a consultant.

The property is adjacent to the estate Pieve Santa Restituta, which was acquired by Gaja in 1994.

Soldera forbade visitors tasting at Case Basse from spitting out wine. He would taste his wines at restaurants only if they had his specially designed glasses.

Soldera strongly advocated the opinion that any wine declared with Montalcino on its label should be a 100% Sangiovese.

=== 2012 winery vandalism ===
On December 2, 2012, the Case Basse winery was broken into and the taps of the barrels of the Brunello production from vintages 2007 to 2012 were opened. The vandalism caused an estimated $6 million loss of more than 600 hectolitres (16,000 US gal) of wine, or ca. 85,000 bottles.

Despite local theories that the vandalism was retribution for Soldera's role in the 2008 "Brunellopoli scandal", Siena police arrested former Case Basse employee Andrea Di Gisi on December 18 after he confessed to the sabotage.

== Production ==
The combined area of the two vineyards Intistieti and Case Basse extends 8 hectares (20 acres). While sufficient fruit could be grown to produce 60,000 bottles per year, yield is kept low to keep annual production at ca. 15,000 bottles, or in difficult years ca. 6,000.

Soldera created an eco-system on his estate, including a two-hectare botanical park that has more than 1,500 unique rose varieties. With his wife, Graziella, a botanist, Soldera built hundreds of nests and beehives that provide shelter for species that predate on vine parasites. This allows Soldera to forgo pesticides and other chemicals in his vineyards.

Case Basse winery ferments in wooden vats with no temperature control and no selected yeasts, and its Brunello is aged in large Slavonian oak casks for up to six years. Soldera despised barriques, as they are "only for deficient wines that didn't get enough tannins and aromas from the grapes".

In good years, Soldera's entire production would be designated as Brunello di Montalcino Riserva (produced in 1983, 1990, 1993, 1995, 1996, 1997, 1998, 1999). Soldera produced in minor vintages or from his youngest vines a table wine called Institieti, in 1985, 1987, 1988, 1991, and 1992. In 2005, Case Basse released an IGT Toscana wine called Pegasos, made with 100% sangiovese. More recently, it released a 2006 IGT Toscana simply named Soldera, made with 100% sangiovese, that had already been bottled before the cellars were vandalized.

Soldera died in Montalcino on February 16, 2019, after his car careened off the road; he was found in cardiac arrest.
