= Soldera =

Soldera is an Italian surname. Notable people with the surname include:

- Francesco Soldera (1892–1957), Italian professional footballer
- Gianfranco Soldera (1937–2019), Italian vintners

== See also ==
- Solder
