= Burton Anderson =

American writer

Burton Anderson is an American writer. A native of Minnesota, he is the former editor of the International Herald Tribune in Paris. He lives in Italy and writes about wine, food, and travel. The New York Times called him "the leading authority on Italian wines writing in English."

== Career ==
In July 1971, as a young journalist, he visited Franco Biondi Santi at Tenuta Il Greppo in Montalcino after being inspired by his Brunello di Montalcino Riserva 1964. The meeting, during which he tried other vintages, motivated him to write an article on Biondi Santi, "Wine for People with Patience" in the International Herald Tribune, inaugurating his career as a wine writer.

In 1977, Anderson quit his job as news editor for the International Herald Tribune in Paris, moved to Tuscany, and devoted himself to writing on Italian wine and food. In 2007, he was inducted into the Writer's Hall of Fame by the Wine Media Guild of New York. In 2009, he was named to the Wines of Italy Hall of Fame by the Italian Trade Commission of New York.

== Books ==
Vino. The Wines & Winemakers of Italy, published by Atlantic-Little, Brown of Boston and Macmillan of London in 1980. The New York Times called it "the standard reference, in Italian as well as English".

The Wine Atlas of Italy was published in 1990 by Mitchell Beazley and Simon & Schuster. It was honored as wine book of the year for 1990 in the UK by the André Simon Memorial Fund and the Glenfiddich Award. In the USA it received the International Association of Culinary Professionals award and the James Beard Award. Matt Kramer wrote in the Los Angeles Times that it "contains not only the best maps of all of Italy's vast vineyard area but also some of the most insightful observations on Italian wine to be found anywhere, in either Italian or English".

Treasures of the Italian Table was published in 1994 in the US by William Morrow and in the UK by Penguin/Viking. For this book, the author won the 1995 James Beard Award for Writing on Food. R. W. Apple Jr. reviewed this book for The New York Times pointing out the author's efforts to take the reader into every corner of Italian food, by revealing its secrets. "

In his blog, Burton Anderson: Beyond Vino, he writes about wine and other topics.

== Bibliography ==
- Vino: The Wines and Winemakers of Italy, Atlantic Little, Brown and Company, 1980. ISBN 978-0-316-03948-2
- The Mitchell Beazley pocket guide to Italian wines (US title: Burton Anderson's Guide to Italian wines) Mitchell Beazley, 1982. Translated into German as Italiens Weine, into Dutch as Wijnwijzer Italië, into Danish as Italienske vine, into Japanese as イタリア・ワイン / Itaria wain
- Biondi Santi : the family that created Brunello di Montalcino, published in English and Italian by the Biondi Santi family in 1988
- The Wine Atlas of Italy, Mitchell Beazley, 1990. ISBN 0855337931
- Treasures of the Italian Table, William Morrow and Company, 1994. ISBN 0688115578
- Franciacorta, Italy’s Sanctuary of Sparkling Wine, published in English and Italian 1999 by Giorgio Mondadori;
- Best Italian Wines was published in 2001 by Little, Brown and Websters in the US and UK.
- Burton Anderson's Best Italian Wines, Websters International Publishers, 2001. ISBN 0316857033
- Atlas of the Wine Roads of Tuscany, published by the Region of Tuscany 2002.
- Wines of Italy, Mitchell Beazley Wine Guides, revised updated edition, 2006. ISBN 978-1-84000-861-6
- Boccadoro, the Honorary Pirate, a novel, iUniverse, 2007
