= Gian Luca Mazzella =

Italian winemaker, former executive consultant and journalist, wine Paterico

Gian Luca Mazzella is an Italian wine grower, former executive consultant and former journalist. In 2024 he released Paterico, the first wine from his own estate in Paternopoli, Irpinia, which was labelled as Taurasi Riserva DOCG. Critics immediately compared Paterico to Brunello di Montalcino Case Basse di Gianfranco Soldera and the Barolo Monfortino by Giacomo Conterno,. Gian Luca Mazzella was named "winemaker of the year". and among the best 100 wineries of Italy.

Gian Luca Mazzella has been a consultant for various realities within the wine sector, and sometimes also for other sectors. As a journalist, Mazzella has worked for European newspapers and magazines, as editor, columnist or feature writer, sometimes under a pseudonym.

Mazzella has also conducted historic wine tastings.
