= Franco Ziliani =

Italian wine critic

Franco Ziliani (Francesco Ziliani, born 09/23/1956 in Milan, is an Italian journalist, blogger and wine critic, with a specialty in Italian wines since 1982. He has contributed to several periodicals including Decanter, A Tavola, Barolo & Co. and Merum, Il Corriere Vinicolo, De Vinis, The World of Fine Wine, as well as a column for Harpers Magazine with Nicolas Belfrage MW with whom he has also contributed to Tom Stevenson's annual Wine Report. Ziliani and Jeremy Parzen launched VinoWire.com in March 2008, to provide an English language news service on the subject of Italian wine. Ziliani has since been credited by La Repubblica with first breaking the 2008 Brunello scandal.

Ziliani has often criticised Angelo Gaja and his style of winemaking, and frequently and controversially refers to James Suckling as "Giacomino Suckling" and his employer publication Wine Spectator as "Wine Speculator".

Franco Ziliani was falsely reported as dead in 2021 - a mistake caused by the death of another Franco Ziliani linked to wine's world (Berlucchi's owner). On 12/30/2024 a famous Italian journalist broke the news of his recovery after a period of illness.

Franco Ziliani now writes for a blog dedicated to wine enthusiasts, www.riflessodivino.it, in the columns: Ziliani racconta and Punture di Ziliani.

== See also ==
- Italian wine
- List of wine personalities
