= Wine fraud =

Fraudulent activity in the commerce of wine

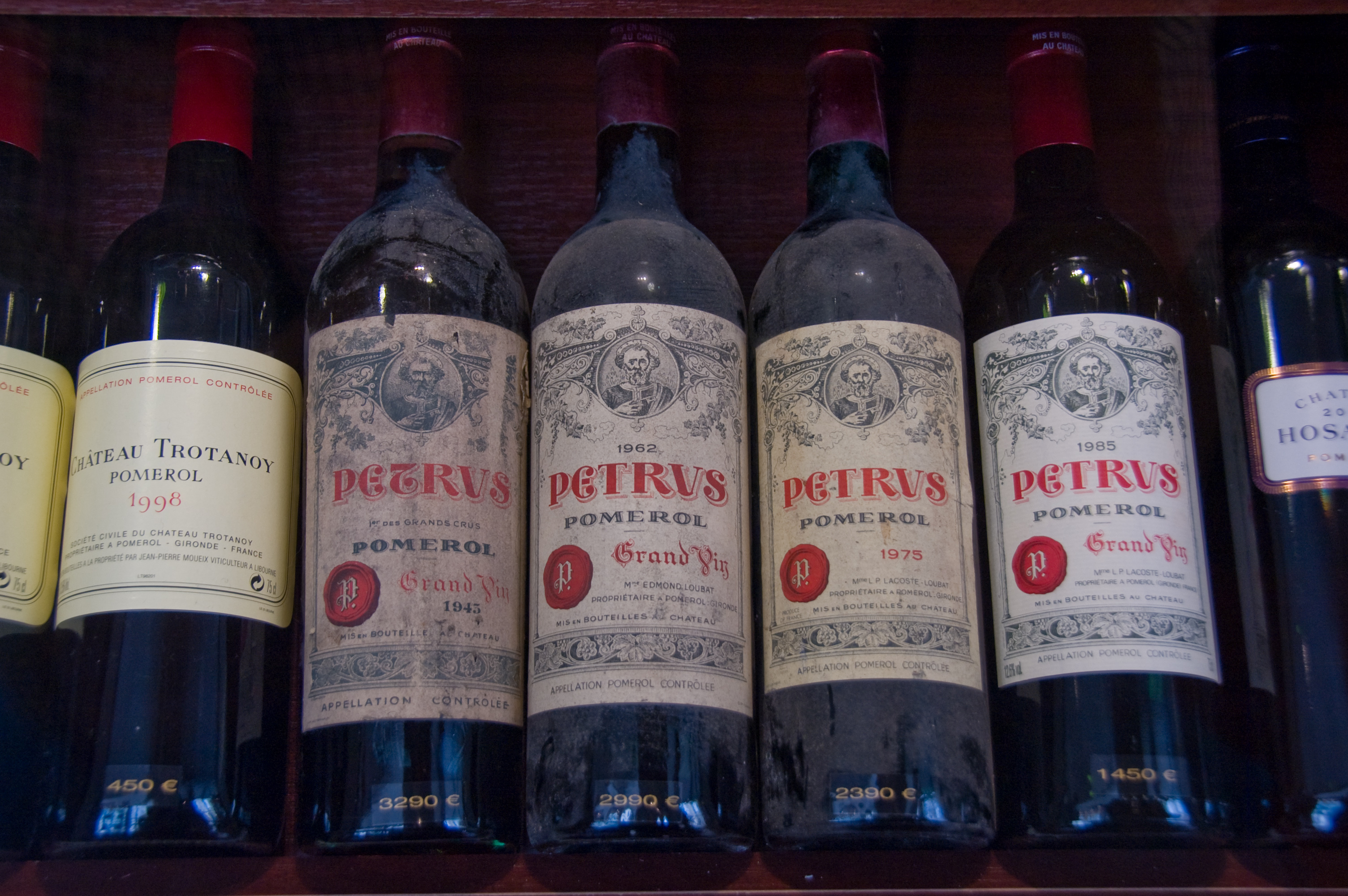
Expensive and highly collectible wines such as the French Bordeaux wine from Château Pétrus are often the target of wine fraud.

Wine fraud relates to dishonest behavior in the commerce of wine. The most prevalent type of fraud involves wines that are adulterated, usually with the addition of cheaper products (such as juices) and sometimes with harmful chemicals and sweeteners (compensating for color or flavor).

Another common type of wine fraud is the counterfeiting and relabelling of inferior and cheaper wines to more expensive brands.

A third category of wine fraud relates to the investment wine industry. An example is the offering of wines to investors at excessively high prices by a company that then goes into planned liquidation. In some cases the wine is never bought for the investor. Losses in the UK have been high, prompting the Department of Trade and Industry ("DTI") and police to act. In the US, investors have been duped by fraudulent investment wine firms. Independent guidelines to potential wine investors are now available.

In wine production, as wine is technically defined as fermented grape juice, the term "wine fraud" can be used to describe the adulteration of wine by substances that are not related to grapes. In the retailing of wine, as wine is comparable with any other commodity, the term "wine fraud" can be used to describe the mis-selling of wine (either as an investment or in its deceitful misrepresentation) in general.

Fraud in wine production refers to the use of additives in order to deceive. This may include coloring agents such as elderberry juice, and flavorings such as cinnamon at best, or less desirable additives at worst. Some varieties of wine have sought after characteristics. For example, some wines have a deep, dark color and flavor notes of spices due to the presence of various phenolic compounds found in the skin of the grapes. Fraudsters use additives to artificially create these characteristics when they are lacking. Fraud in the selling of wine has seen much attention focused on label fraud and the investment wine market. Counterfeit labelling of rare, expensive, and cult wines, and unregulated investment wine firms, characterise this type of fraud. Wine Spectator noted as much as 5% of the wine sold in secondary markets could be counterfeit, and the UK's DTI believes losses by investors to rogue wine investment firms amount to hundreds of millions of pounds.

== History ==
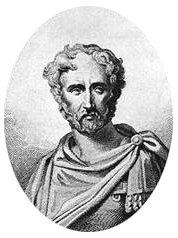
During the classical period, wine was so often adulterated and counterfeited that Pliny the Elder complained that not even the nobility could be assured that their wine was genuine.

For as long as wine has been made, it has been manipulated, adulterated, and counterfeited. In ancient Rome, Pliny the Elder complained about the abundance of fraudulent Roman wine which was so great that even the nobility could not be assured that the wine they were pouring on their table was genuine. For the poor and middle class of Rome, local bar establishments seemed to have an unlimited supply of the prestigious Falernian wine for unusually low prices.

During the Middle Ages, wines from questionable origins were often passed off as wines from more prestigious regions. In London, local authorities established laws for tavern owners prohibiting French, Spanish, and German wines from being cellared together so as to prevent the potential for mixing the wines or falsely representing them to the consumer. If a producer or merchant was found selling fraudulent or "corrupt wine", they were forced to drink all of it. In medieval Germany, the penalty for selling fraudulent wine ranged from branding to beating to death by hanging.

During the Age of Enlightenment, advancements in science ushered in a new occupation of "wine doctors" who could fashion examples of wines from obscure items and chemicals. Writers like Joseph Addison wrote of this "fraternity of chymical operators (sic)" who would use apples to make Champagne and sloe to make Bordeaux and then sell these wines fraudulently on the market. Following the Phylloxera epidemic, when true wine was scarce, wine fraud rose. Some merchants would take dried raisins grown from other species of grapevines and make wine that they passed off as being from a more prestigious provenance such as the more well known wines from France or Italy.

In the early 19th century, several European writers wrote about the risk and prevalence of wine fraud. In 1820, German chemist Friedrich Accum noted that wine was one of the commodities most at risk for being fraudulently manipulated and misrepresented. In 1833, the British wine writer Cyrus Redding echoed the alarm over the unchecked operations of these "wine doctors". Eventually the concern over wine fraud grew enough that provisions against the adulteration and misrepresentation of wine was included in British Parliament's Adulteration of Food and Drink Act 1860 (23 & 24 Vict. c. 84). Several European governments also enacted legislation defining what exactly constitutes "wine" so as to distinguish authentic winemaking from the workings of these wine counterfeiters. The French government first legally defined wine as the product of fermented grape juice in 1889, followed by the German government in 1892 (later expanded in 1909) and the Italian government in 1904.

Fraud of a different nature occurred during prohibition in the United States, when wine production was illegal, as grape merchants would sell "bricks" of grape concentrate across the United States along with a packet of dried yeast. The bricks would come with a "warning label" cautioning people not to mix the contents of the brick, yeast, water, and sugar in a pot and then seal such pot for seven days, or else "an illegal alcoholic beverage will result".

The practice of adding grape spirits to wine was once considered manipulative and fraudulent, but today is accepted practice for the production of all fortified wines, like Port.

Over the years, winemaking techniques have evolved. The first, primitive "natural wine" or "authentic wine" was most likely the result of crushed grapes being forgotten while stored in a container. The process of allowing wild yeast found on the surface of the grape conduct fermentation in an uncontrolled environment creates a very crude style of wine that may not be palatable to many people, hence the development of various techniques and practices designed to improve the quality of the wine but which could be viewed as "manipulating" or "adulterating" the wine from its natural or "authentic state". At various points in history, these techniques may be considered “too much” manipulation, more than what a consumer would likely expect, and thus labeled as "fraud". However, as these techniques became more common place in the wine industry, they gained an air of acceptability and eventually became just another tool in the winemaker's tool box to help craft good-quality wine.

Most techniques of manipulation arose from need. Early wine had many wine faults that caused a wine to spoil quickly. Classical writings from the Greeks and Romans detailed recipes that could cure "sick wines". These include adding various items like milk, ground mustard, ashes, nettles, and lead. Another example of early "manipulation" that became accepted, common practice was the process of adding grape spirit to wine made in the Douro region of Portugal. This process of fortification gave the wine chemical stability for long sea voyages and, when added during the fermentation process, left the wine with a balance of residual sugar and alcohol content that gave the wine a unique taste. This style of wine became very popular on the world wine market. Today the accepted way to make Port is to "manipulate" it by adding brandy during the fermentation process.

Other winemaking techniques that have been at various times considered fraudulent or too manipulative of the wine include chaptalization, fermenting and aging in oak barrels, using oak chips, stirring lees, racking, clarification and filtration, reverse osmosis, cold maceration, the use of cultured instead of wild yeast, cryo-extraction, micro-oxygenation, and the addition of enzymes, anti-oxidant agents, acids or other sugars that may be used to "balance" the wine.

While some winemaking techniques once considered fraudulent are now generally accepted, a few practices have gone in the opposite direction. One of the most controversial is adding water to wine in a technique known today as humidification. Master of wine Jancis Robinson calls the act of adding water to "stretch out" or dilute wine "possibly the oldest form of wine fraud in the book." There is a long history of adding water to dilute wine in order to make it more palatable. The ancient Greeks thought it was "barbaric" to drink undiluted wine. They further believed that undiluted wine was unhealthy and that the Spartan king Cleomenes I was once driven insane after drinking wine that was not diluted with water. Today, few consumers dilute their wine as the Greeks did, but the use of water during the winemaking process is still prevalent.

Today water is used to help balance extremely ripe grapes that would have a high concentration of sugars and phenolic compounds. Modern winemaking has begun to promote higher levels of ripeness and longer "hang time" on the vine before harvesting. This increased emphasis on ripeness has had the effect of producing wines with higher alcohol levels (often over 15%). In many countries, such high alcohol levels qualify the wines for higher levels of duties and taxes. Adding water to grape must can dilute the wine to such a degree that the overall alcohol by volume drops below the percentage threshold for these higher taxes. The deliberate act of diluting a wine with water in order to pay lower duties and taxes is illegal in several countries.

The gray area between accepted practice and fraud is where water is added to the winemaking process as a means of "quality preservation". Water is often used during the winemaking process to help pump grapes through equipment and to "rehydrate" the grapes that have begun to shrivel from the extended hang time. This rehydration is used to help balance the wine and, it is hoped, to prevent "dried fruit" flavors that may be unpalatable to the consumer. In the United States, the California Wine Institute has developed guidelines that allow for the addition of a certain amount of water to compensate for the loss of natural water in the vineyard from dehydration. The addition of water has been argued by its proponents as necessary to prevent stuck fermentations. Despite being allowed limited legal use, the practice of adding water to wine is still shrouded in controversy, and few winemakers willingly admit to it. A "code word" for the practice in the wine industry is adding "Jesus units" in a play on words about the Biblical story of the miracle performed at the Marriage at Cana where Jesus turned water into wine.

== Label fraud ==
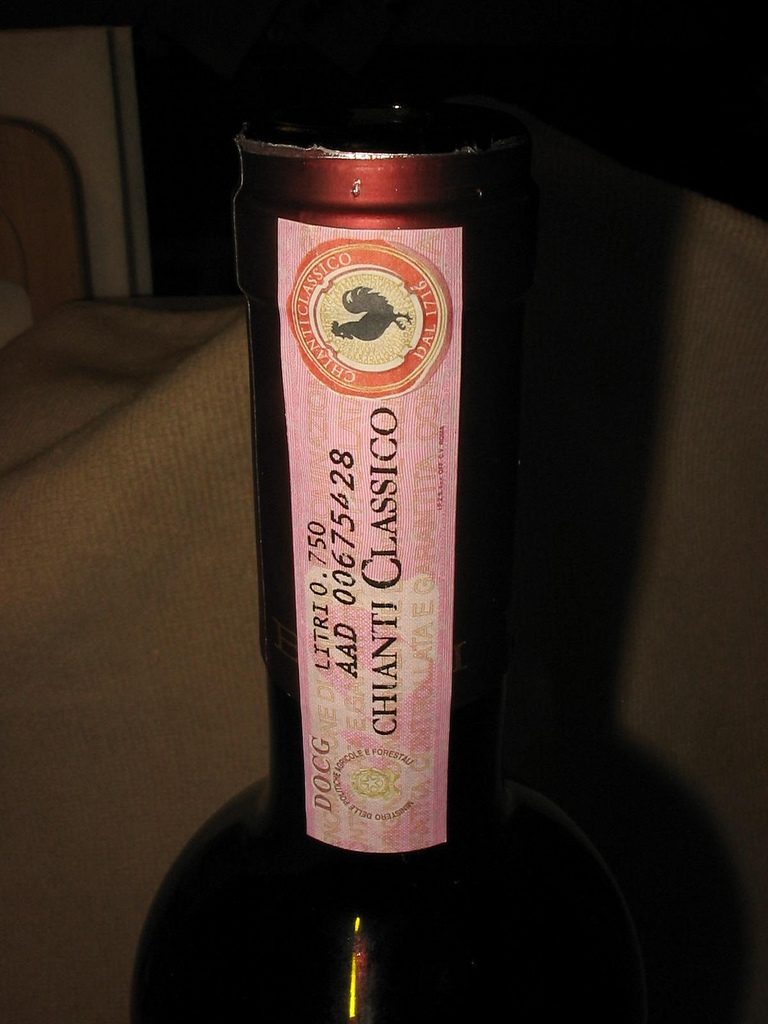
Several European countries developed appellation systems, with their own unique labels and seals, to try to combat label fraud that misrepresented a wine's true origins.

One form of fraud involves affixing counterfeit labels of expensive wines to bottles of less expensive wine. This practice became particularly prominent following the devastation of the phylloxera epidemic in the 19th century when the supply of expensive premium wine was scarce. At first, the label fraud mostly consisted of taking a wine from a region of lesser acclaim (such as Southwest France or Calabria in Italy) and then labeling the wine as if it came from more prestigious regions such as Bordeaux or Tuscany. To counter this type of fraud, governments developed extensive appellation systems and Protected Designation of Origin or (PDOs) that attempted to regulate wines labeled as coming from particular wine regions. Early attempts to protect the name of a wine region led to government declaration on the boundaries and wine permitted to carry the names of Chianti, Oporto and Tokaji. Today most major European wine producing countries have some appellation system of protected origins. The most well known systems include the Appellation d'origine contrôlée (AOC) used in France, the Denominazione di origine controllata (DOC) used in Italy, the Denominação de Origem Controlada (DOC) used in Portugal, and the Denominación de Origen (DO) system used in Spain. Producers who are registered in each appellation must abide by the appellation's rules, including exact percentage of grapes (often 100%) that must come from that region. Producers who fraudulently use grapes outside the region they are proclaiming on their wine labels can be caught by the appellation's authorities.

As it became more difficult to fraudulently label wines with the wrong provenance, label fraud soon evolved to the pilfering of the identities of wine estates themselves. Merchants would take the bottles of lesser priced wines and label them with the names of the finest classified Bordeaux estates or Grand crus of Burgundy. Label fraud, to be done well, requires bottles, corks, and packaging to be similarly manipulated. Reporter Pierre-Marie Doutrelant "disclosed that many famous Champagne houses, when short on stock, bought bottled but unlabeled wine from cooperatives or one of the big private-label producers in the region, then sold it as their own". A high-profile instance of alleged wine fraud was disclosed in early 2007, when it was reported that the Federal Bureau of Investigation had opened an investigation into the counterfeiting of old and rare vintages.

=== Examples ===
One of the most famous alleged purveyors of label fraud is wine collector Hardy Rodenstock. In the 1980s and 1990s, Rodenstock hosted a series of high-profile wine tasting events of old and rare wines from his collection, including many from the 18th and 19th centuries. He invited to these tastings dignitaries, celebrities and internationally acclaimed wine writers and critics such as Jancis Robinson, Robert M. Parker Jr. and Michael Broadbent who at the time was a director at the London auction house Christie's and considered one of the world's foremost authorities on rare wine. At one such tasting, Rodenstock produced 125 vintages of Château d'Yquem, including a very rare bottle from the 1784 vintage. In addition to holding these extravagant tastings, Rodenstock also sold many bottles from his collection at auction houses, which supposedly regularly inspect and research wines for authenticity. One such lot that Rodenstock sold were the rare "Jefferson bottles", reportedly rare Bordeaux wines bottled for the American president, Thomas Jefferson. American businessman Bill Koch bought four of these Jefferson bottles which were later determined to be fake - the engravings on the bottle that purportedly linked them to Jefferson were determined to have been done with a high-speed electric drill similar to a dentist's drill; technology that did not exist until modern times. This revelation cast a net of suspicion on the authenticity of all the rare bottles that Rodenstock served at his tastings and sold at auctions.

Another well-publicized example of label fraud is the case of Rudy Kurniawan; he was arrested on March 8, 2012 and indicted for fraud. Allegedly, Kurniwan was buying large stocks of negociant Burgundy and re-labeling them as more expensive wines, such as Domaine de la Romanée-Conti. He famously consigned several lots of Clos St. Denis from Domaine Ponsot from vintages long prior to any recorded production of Ponsot wines from that vineyard; the auction lots were withdrawn prior to bidding.

In 2002, bottles of the weaker 1991 vintage of Château Lafite Rothschild were relabeled and sold as the acclaimed 1982 vintage in China. In 2000, Italian authorities uncovered a warehouse with nearly twenty thousand bottles of fake "Super Tuscan" 1995 Sassicaia and arrested a number of people including the group's salesperson, who was selling the fake wine out of the back of a Peugeot hatchback.

=== Preventions ===
Federal governments and individual producers have taken many efforts in order to curb the prevalence of wine fraud. One of the earliest such preventive measures was the founding of the Service de la Répression des Fraudes by the French government to detect and stamp out fraud among France's AOC wines. Some major producers are taking actions to prevent fraud of future vintages including marking bottles with engraved serial numbers on the glass and taking more control of the distribution process of their wines. However, for older vintages, the threat of fraud persists, although new techniques, like stable isotope analysis and isoscapes are likely to grow in importance.

== Wine blending ==
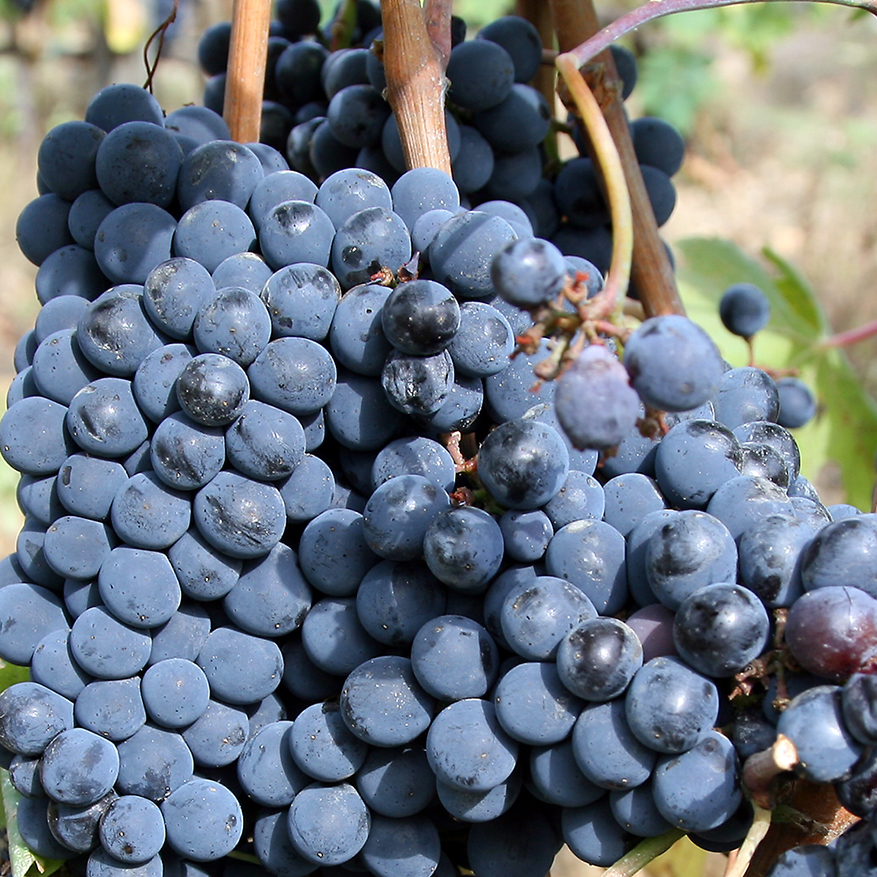
The rumors that grapes other than Sangiovese (pictured) were being used in the production of Brunello di Montalcino triggered an investigation into the potential wine fraud.

Some practices of manipulation and adulteration have gone through stages of being considered fraudulent and later accepted as common practice. One of these is the practice of blending other grape varieties in order to add a characteristic that is lacking in the original wine. This most often occurred in the case of a wine lacking color. A wine with a deep dark color is often associated with being of a higher quality, so blending a darker color variety (or a teinturier) into a lighter wine could enhance the marketability of the wine. Today the practice of blending grape varieties together is commonly accepted (such as blending Cabernet Sauvignon and Merlot), except where such blending is against the regulation of a particular appellation (such as the controversy over the Brunellopoli scandal in Brunello di Montalcino).

The gray area comes when inferior wine is being blended in with more expensive, higher-quality wine in order to increase the total quantity of wine available to be sold at higher prices. This is a process known as "stretching" or "cutting in" the wine. During the 18th century, Bordeaux wine producers would often import wine from Spain, Rhone or the Languedoc to blend and stretch out their wine which they sold to the English as claret. While this practice would be frowned upon today by Bordeaux authorities, the French wine writer André Jullien noted that some merchants believed this practice was necessary in order for the claret to be agreeable with English tastes—a practice he describes as "travail à l'anglaise".

=== Examples ===
Reporter Doutrelant reported the comments of "a government inspector on the illegal use of sugar to boost the alcoholic content of Beaujolais-Villages: 'If the law had been enforced in 1973 and 1974, at least a thousand producers would have been put out of business'". The same writer explained how growers "planted Mourvèdre and Syrah, two low-yield grapes that give the wine finesse, strictly for the benefit of the government inspectors. Then, when the inspectors left, they grafted cheap, high-yield vines, Grenache and Carignan, back onto the vines".

In March 2008, allegations were made against producers of Brunello di Montalcino that there were illegally blended other types of grape varieties into wine stipulated to be of 100% Sangiovese, allegedly to inflate production and increase profit, in a scandal termed "Brunellopoli".

Many Burgundy wine shippers have been found guilty of blending inexpensive wine with red Burgundies and exporting them at exorbitant prices. The Vins Georges Duboeuf company was found guilty and fined in 2006 for illegally mixing Gamay from Beaujolais Villages with Beaujolais Cru grapes from Brouilly, Côte-de-brouilly and Moulin-à-Vent in the 2005 vintage. The issue was confined to a small percentage of the wine produced by Duboeuf; the affected wines that were wrongly labeled as Cru Beaujolais were declassified to Beaujolais Villages.

== Hazardous materials ==
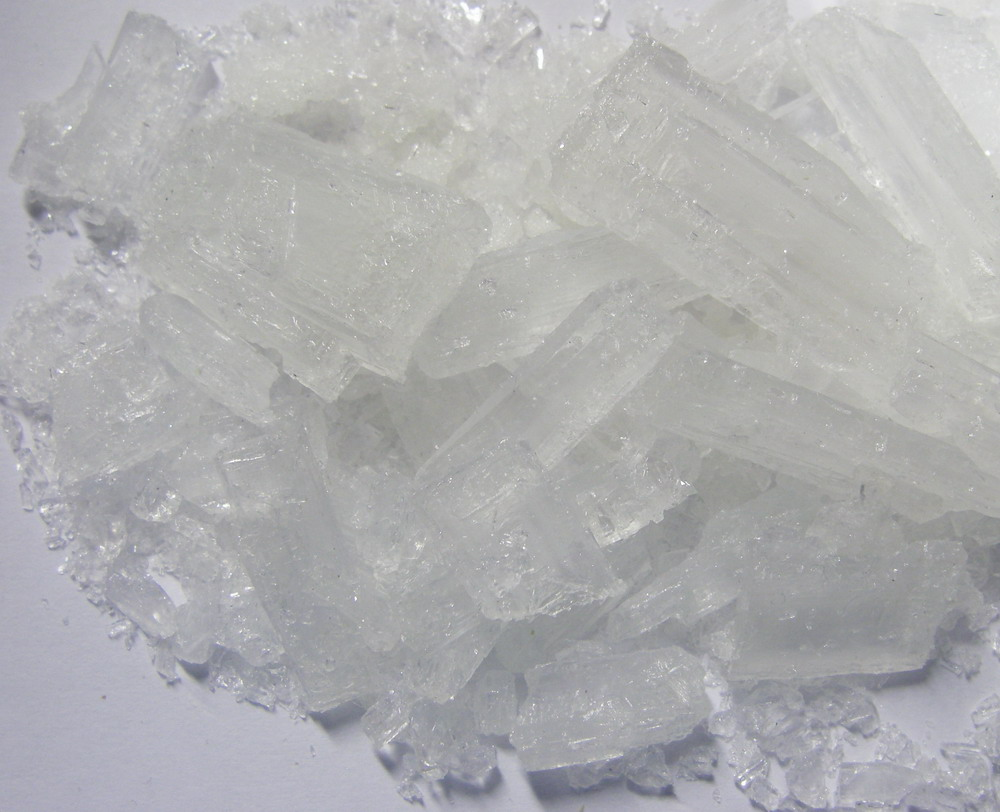
A dangerous form of wine fraud is the use of hazardous materials in the wine making. Ancient Romans and others used to blend lead acetate into their wine in order to add sweetness.

One of the most dangerous forms of wine fraud is when producers add hazardous materials such as lead(II) acetate ("sugar of lead"), diethylene glycol, and methanol to wine in order to increase sweetness. Some chemicals may be used to mask other wine faults and unpleasant aroma. Government authorities, such as the European Union and the American Food and Drug Administration, across the globe have set up laws and regulations of acceptable chemicals that can be added to wine in order to avoid some of the scandals that have plagued certain wine producing countries in the 20th century.

In 1985, diethylene glycol was added as an adulterant by some Austrian producers of white wines to make them sweeter and upgrade the dry wines to sweet wines; production of sweet wines is expensive and addition of sugar is easy to detect. In 1986, twenty-three people died because a fraudulent winemaker in Italy blended toxic methyl alcohol into his low-alcohol wine to increase its alcohol content. Another 15 Italian people went blind weeks after drinking the tainted wine. Odore Barbera and Fraris Dolcetto del Piedmonte were among the wine labels involved in the scandal.

== See also ==
- 2018 Master Sommelier exam cheating scandal
- Investment wine
- Rudy Kurniawan
- Hardy Rodenstock
- Wine-Searcher
