= Hardy Rodenstock =

German wine collector (1941–2018)

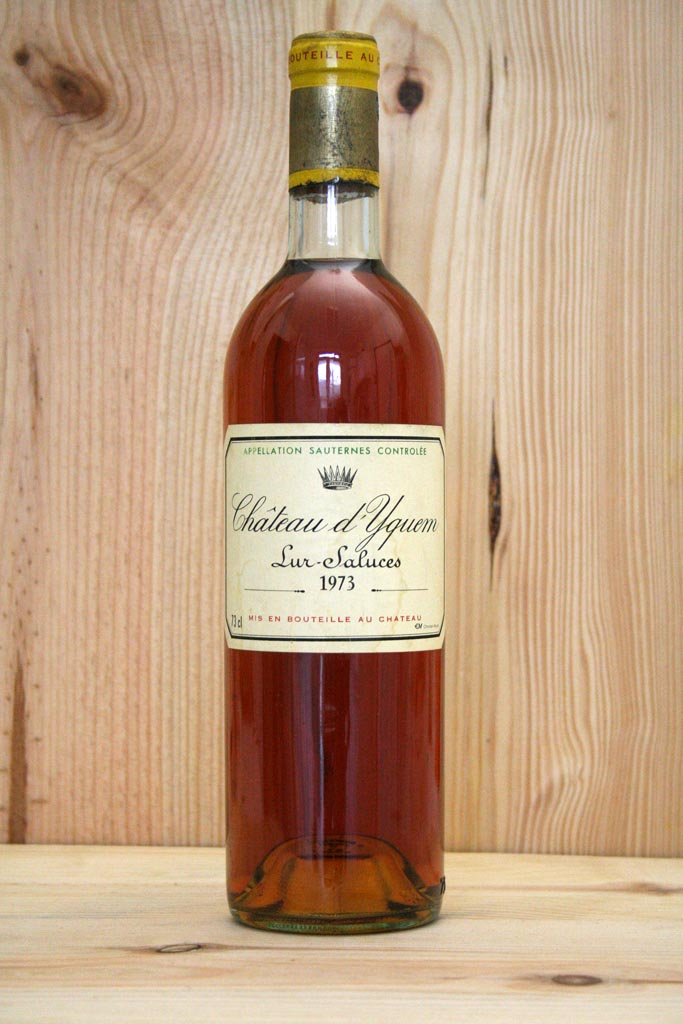
125 vintages of Château d'Yquem were the subject of Rodenstock's most famous tasting in 1998 (a bottle of vintage 1973 is pictured)

Meinhard Görke, known as Hardy Rodenstock (7 December 1941 – 19 May 2018) was a German publisher and manager of pop and Schlager music, and a prominent wine collector, connoisseur, and trader, with a special interest in old and rare wines. He became famous for his allegedly uncanny ability to track down old and very rare wines, and for arranging extravagant wine tastings featuring these wines. It has been alleged that Rodenstock was the perpetrator of an elaborate wine fraud. In 1992, a German court found that Rodenstock had "knowingly offered adulterated wine" for sale. On appeal, the case was settled out of court.

== Rare wine tastings ==
From 1980, Rodenstock arranged annual high-profile wine tastings of old and rare wines from his collections to which he invited friends and other prominent people. The tastings would be weekend tastings held at gourmet restaurants, hotels, and resorts, and they featured huge quantities of wine at Rodenstock's expense. The participants included German celebrities and later, expanded to include some of the most prominent international wine critics.

The most famous Rodenstock tasting was held from 30 August to 5 September 1998 at Hotel Königshof in Munich, when a tasting of 125 vintages of Château d'Yquem, the oldest of which were of the 1784 vintage, was held. Two eighteenth-century, forty nineteenth-century, and all released twentieth-century vintages of Château d'Yquem up to 1991 were featured in this vertical tasting, which was conducted over the course of a week. The events of the week included five luncheons, seven dinners, and more than 175 other wines. It is most likely the most extensive Yquem tasting to that date and it has been the subject of a book.

The exclusive nature of the wine selection featured at Rodenstock's tastings is indicated by the fact that Michael Broadbent, who was considered to be the world's leading authority on old wines, had tasted many of the rarest and oldest wines at Rodenstock's tastings, in particular, most eighteenth-century wines he has tasted.

Other participants at the Rodenstock tastings included Jancis Robinson, Robert M. Parker Jr., and the then-owner of Château d'Yquem, Alexandre de Lur-Saluces.

== Alleged Thomas Jefferson wine bottles ==
=== Finding and sales of the bottles ===
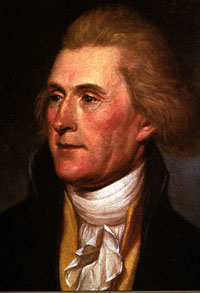
1791 portrait of oenophile Thomas Jefferson. He later arranged to have French and other European wine sent to him in the U.S.

Rodenstock had not just served wines at his annual tasting, but also bought and sold at wine auctions. In 1985, he came into possession of his most famous bottles, which later, have become the subject of considerable controversy as to their authenticity and provenance. According to Rodenstock's own account, in early 1985 he received a telephone call about a discovery of old wine bottles in Paris. The bottles had been found in a walled-up old cellar, and were engraved with vintage years from the late eighteenth century. This had in itself been an interesting find for a collector of old wines, but the bottles also were engraved with the initials "Th. J.", which was taken as an indication that they had belonged to Thomas Jefferson. Jefferson was an active œnophile and wine collector, who spent much time in France during the 1780s and whose interest in wine is well documented.

Later the same year, on 5 December 1985, Rodenstock put one of the "Th. J." bottles up for auction at Christie's in London: a bottle of 1787 Château Lafite, engraved "1787 Lafitte Th. J.". The auction catalogue simply listed the value as "inestimable", and it was sold for 105,000 pound sterling, which as of 2007 remained the worldwide auction record for a single bottle of wine. The buyer was Christopher Forbes, bidding against Marvin Shanken of Wine Spectator Magazine, with Michael Broadbent handling the gavel at the auction.

Additional "Th. J." bottles were sold, via other auction houses.

=== Concerns about authenticity ===
In 2005, U.S. art and wine collector Bill Koch, who had bought some of the bottles attributed to Thomas Jefferson, prepared to exhibit items from his collection at the Boston Museum of Fine Arts, including the Jefferson bottles. The museum asked for provenance of the items to be displayed. In 1988, Koch had bought four bottles of Château Lafite and Branne-Mouton (present-day Château Mouton-Rothschild) of the 1784 and 1787 vintages, at a U.S. wine auction house (Chicago Wine Company) and a UK rare wine dealer (Farr Vintners), and paid a total of about 500,000 U.S. dollars for them. When Koch's staff couldn't find anything except Michael Broadbent's authentification of the bottles to confirm their provenance, the Thomas Jefferson Foundation at Monticello, Charlottesville, Virginia was contacted. The foundation's curator replied that based on Jefferson's records, the foundation did not think that the bottles had been in the possession of Thomas Jefferson. Inquiries at Chicago Wine Company and Farr Vintners came up with the result that all four of Koch's bottles originated with Rodenstock.

After initial attempts at contacts with Rodenstock gave no significant results, Koch hired a retired Federal Bureau of Investigation (FBI) agent to form a team to start private investigations into Rodenstock's sales of wine. David Molyneux-Berry, former head of Sotheby's wine department was hired as a consultant, and several forensic investigations were conducted on the wines, bottles, and engravings; Koch alleges that the engravings were made with an electric power tool, which would not have been possible in the eighteenth century and would indicate modern forgery.

On 31 August 2006 Koch filed a civil lawsuit against Rodenstock (a.k.a. Görke) in a New York federal court, claiming that he had been the victim of fraud. The reason that Rodenstock personally was named as defendant, rather than Chicago Wine Company or Farr Vintners, was that Koch claimed that Rodenstock had orchestrated an ongoing scheme to defraud wine collectors. Koch's lawsuit included many results from his team's forensic investigations. This lawsuit was then the subject of many legal turns during 2007 and 2008, primarily focused on procedural and statutory issues. A default judgment was entered against Rodenstock in May 2010. Rodenstock refused to participate in the trial.

=== Details of legal turns during 2007 and 2008 ===
Rodenstock maintained that as a German citizen living in Germany, the court had no jurisdiction over him, especially since the bottles were bought from third parties, and, that the statute of limitation should bar the case. Thus, he refused to take part in the proceedings. Therefore, on 14 August 2007 the magistrate judge supervising the pretrial procedures recommended that the court should enter a default judgment against Rodenstock, provided that the case was not dismissed by the trial judge because of Rodenstock's procedural defences.

On 11 January 2008 the case was dismissed by the judge because the court was lacking personal jurisdiction over Rodenstock as defendant. Koch was given 30 days to refile his lawsuit if he was dissatisfied with the court's ruling. He did so on 11 February 2008. The refiled lawsuit attempted to address the issue of the court's jurisdiction over Rodenstock. When the case was refiled, it was not known when the court would next respond to it. When Rodenstock still refused to take part in the proceedings after the lawsuit was refiled, Koch argued on 27 March 2008 that Rodenstock should be found in default. At the same time, Koch filed a lawsuit in Chicago against the Chicago Wine Company and the Chicago-based Julienne Importing Company.

Sometime later, Koch claimed to have obtained evidence that nine additional bottles in his possession, dated from 1737 to 1936, also were fakes or "highly suspect" and they had originated with Rodenstock. Therefore, in June 2008, Koch asked the court's permission to file a second, amended complaint.

=== Rodenstock's position ===
To media covering the trial, Rodenstock presented various arguments to support the authenticity of the "Th. J." bottles, and counter-arguments to Koch's claim. He never revealed the name of the person who sold the bottles to him, the address in Paris where the bottles were purportedly found, nor the exact number of bottles found. Figures ranging from "a dozen or so" to thirty have been quoted throughout the years. The German magazine Stern, which ran a story on the Jefferson bottle controversy in March 2007, offered Rodenstock to have bottles still in his possession analysed by the Federal Institute for Materials Research and Testing (which determined the Hitler Diaries to be faked) at their expense, but Rodenstock declined.

=== Book on the controversy ===
In May 2008, a book about the controversy was published under the title The Billionaire's Vinegar, written by Benjamin Wallace. In the book a tritium test and two carbon-14 tests date the wine circa 1962. Rodenstock was not available for comments on the publication of the book. Auctioneer Michael Broadbent, on the other hand, was unhappy with how his relationship to Rodenstock was portrayed in the book.

In July 2009 it was announced that Michael Broadbent would sue Random House, the publishers of The Billionaire's Vinegar, for libel and defamation of character, on claims that the book made allegations that suggested that Broadbent had behaved in an unprofessional manner in the way in which he had auctioned some of these bottles and that his relationship and dealings with Hardy Rodenstock was suspected of being improper. The suit was filed in the United Kingdom, whose libel laws are more favourable to the defendant as the plaintiff has to demonstrate the infraction. Random House initially stated it did not believe it had defamed Broadbent and would defend the lawsuit.

In October 2009, Random House, avoiding trial, entered into a settlement agreement with Broadbent. In a statement read out in open court, Random House apologised unreservedly for making the allegations, and accepted that they were untrue. It gave an undertaking not to repeat the allegations and paid Broadbent undisclosed damages. It removed the book from sale in the United Kingdom. It also was reported that Wallace was not a party to the lawsuit or settlement, that Random House would be making no changes to the book, and that it would continue to publish the book in all territories except the UK.

== Pétrus imperial bottle controversy ==
In late 1990s, David Peppercorn and his wife, Serena Sutcliffe, created controversy when they questioned the authenticity of Imperial (6 liter) bottles of Château Pétrus from the 1921, 1924, 1926, 1928, and 1934 vintages that were served at collectors' wine tasting events in 1989 and 1990. The tastings were conducted from the personal collection of Rodenstock, who claimed to have purchased them from a private collector in England. While Peppercorn and Sutcliffe's concerns were never proven, and were disputed by Rodenstock, the current manager of Château Pétrus, Christian Moueix, confirmed that the estate has no records of producing Imperials during those vintages.

Subsequently, the authenticity of some magnums (1.5-liter bottles) of 1921 Pétrus that Rodenstock sold, also have been the subject of litigation. The 1921 is notable as having been awarded a perfect 100-point score by Robert Parker, based on his tasting at the 1995 Munich event.

== Royal Wine Merchants ==
In a March 2010 lawsuit filed against Christie's, Koch alleges, among other things, that Rodenstock distributed many bottles in the United States via Daniel Oliveros and Jeff Sokolin of Royal Wine Merchants – 818 bottles between 1998 and 2008, virtually all rarities, of which 87% were magnum size (1.5 L). Such a volume of rare wines in a rare format has provoked skepticism, and Oliveros and Sokolin have been accused by various sources, including Robert Parker, of selling fake wine, which they deny; some of the wines in question are documented as having originated with Rodenstock, though Royal and Rodenstock disagree on specifics. In May 2012, the U.S. Court of Appeals for the Second Circuit ruled that the claims against Christie's were time-barred and affirmed the dismissal of the case.
