= Franco Biondi Santi =

Italian winemaker

Franco Biondi Santi (January 11, 1922 – April 8, 2013) was an Italian winemaker, most known for producing Brunello di Montalcino, a red wine produced only in Montalcino, Tuscany.

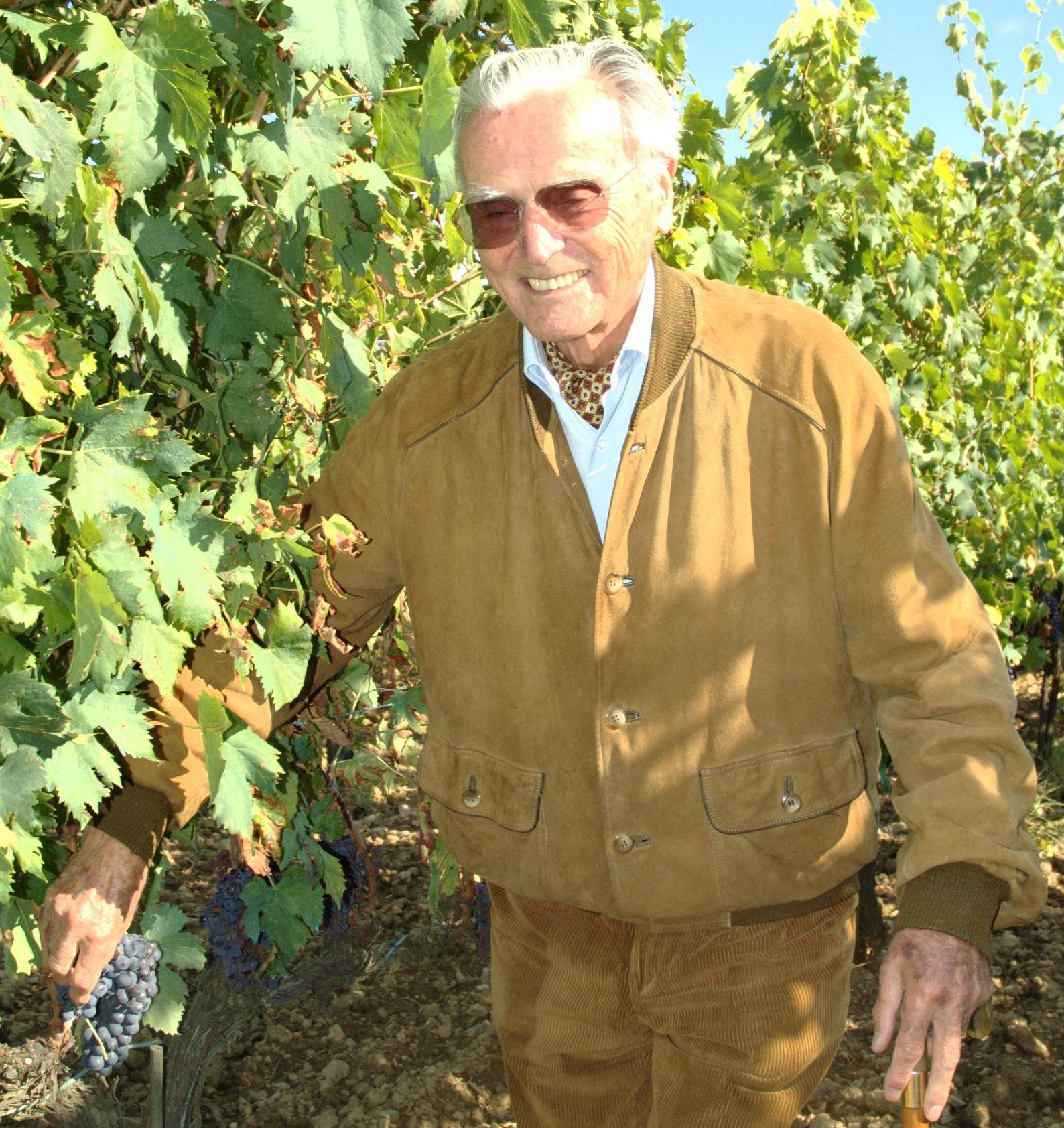
Franco Biondi Santi

== Biography ==
Franco Biondi Santi was born in Montalcino in 1922, and died in 2013, survived by his wife Maria Floria, their children Jacopo and Alessandra, and four grandchildren.

== Career ==
Franco Biondi Santi's grandfather, Ferruccio Biondi Santi, invented Brunello di Montalcino in the late 1800s. Franco himself learned the winemaking craft from his father, Tancredi. When Franco inherited the family’s Greppo estate in 1970, he kept to his father’s traditions while also improving quality. He remained at the helm of the family firm, Tenuta Il Greppo, until his death, overseeing every aspect of the vineyards and the winemaking.

In July 1971 Burton Anderson, a young journalist for the International Herald Tribune, went to visit Franco Biondi Santi at Tenuta Il Greppo in Montalcino after being inspired by his Brunello Riserva 1964. The meeting motivated him to write his first wine article on Biondi Santi's wines and inaugurated his career as a wine writer.

During World War II, Franco helped his father wall up the family’s old Riservas just before the Front passed through the area in 1944. Years later, he held a number of vertical tastings with these Riservas—going back to the late 1800s—that demonstrated the wine's aging capacity. The winery has maintained a non-interventionist approach in the cellar, fermenting the wine only by means of native yeasts and using only large, neutral Slavonian casks, as Sangiovese is naturally rich in tannins and does not need to be supplemented by the wood tannins imparted by small barriques. He was always a defender of a 100% Sangiovese Brunello di Montalcino, even at times when his wines were considered old-fashioned.

In 1990 he led a campaign to successfully block a massive landfill planned for the outskirts of Montalcino that would have put Brunello production at risk.
