= Castiglion del Bosco =

Estate in Siena, Tuscany, Italy

Castiglion del Bosco is a wine estate which produces Brunello di Montalcino and was one of the founders of Brunello di Montalcino Consortium. It is located in the comune of Montalcino in the province of Siena, Italy, within the Val d’Orcia nature reserve, a UNESCO World Heritage Site.

== Geography ==
Castiglion del Bosco extends across 2,000 hectares, most of which comprises dense woodland and a wildlife hunting reserve. A portion of the property is used to grow organic crops. Castiglion del Bosco contains a winery that mainly produces Brunello di Montalcino, and is one of the founding members of the Consorzio del vino Brunello di Montalcino. Massimo and Chiara Ferragamo became the owners of Castiglion del Bosco in 2003.

== Production ==
The estate of Castiglion del Bosco extends 2000 hectares (5000 acres), of which 62 hectares (152 acres) are cultivate with Sangiovese grape to produce Brunello di Montalcino DOCG, the single vineyard "Campo del Drago" Brunello di Montalcino DOCG, the "Millecento" Brunello di Montalcino Riserva and the Rosso di Montalcino DOC.

== Monuments ==
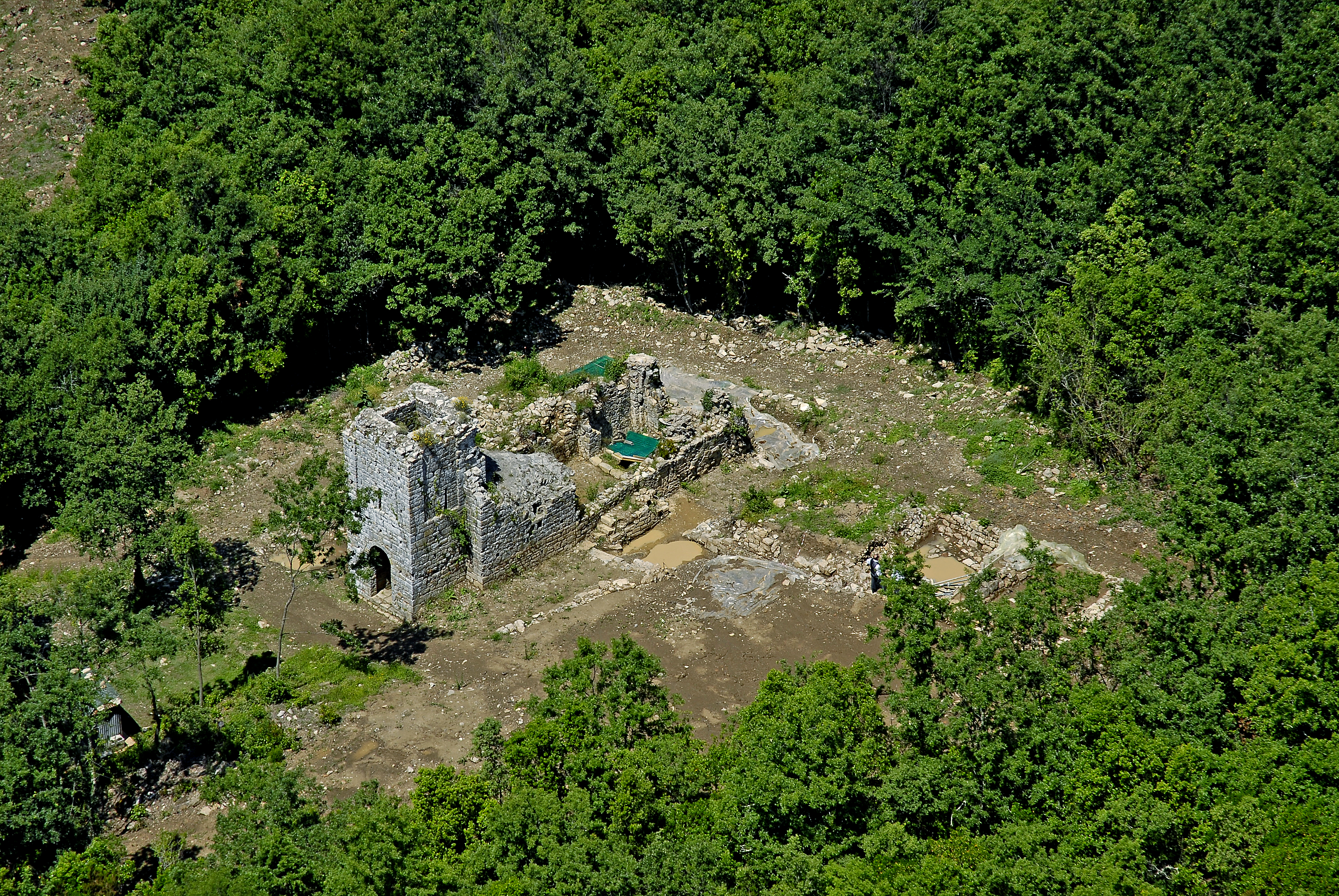
Ruins of Pieve of San Michele, in Castiglion del Bosco

=== San Michele Church ===
San Michele Church sits In the borgo of Castiglion del Bosco. It hosts the original fresco of Pietro Lorenzetti, Annunciazione dei Santi dating to 1345 AD. Pietro and his brother, Ambrogio Lorenzetti, belonged to the Sienese School that flourished during the late Middle Ages and foreshadowed the art of the Renaissance.

=== Medieval castle ===
The site also contains the ruins of the castle, which dates back to 1100 AD. Part of the tower and its walls, which were erected by the Cacciaconti di Trequanda family at the beginning of the XIII century remain visible.

== History ==
Archaeological excavations of the estate at Castiglion del Bosco revealed that it has been occupied from as far back as 600 BC, with the Etruscans prizing its elevated position as a military outlook. In 1966 a group of archaeologists found presence of a Lombards village (6th - 8th century AD) as well as a Roman settlement from the Augustan age (tombs 1st century BC – 1st century AD)

Castiglion del Bosco's castle was built in classic medieval style. The castle is certified for the first time in a tax document from the early 1200s as "Castellione Iuxta Umbronem".

In1318AD Castiglion del Bosco was taken over by the Gallerani family– prosperous merchants who held public offices in Siena. It has been claimed that Cecilia Gallerani, was the subject of Leonardo da Vinci’s painting “The Lady with an Ermine” and a muse for the “Mona Lisa”.

Castiglion del Bosco also bears the imprint of other Sienese families, one of whom brought here the artistic talents of Pietro Lorenzetti, whose fresco Annunciazione ai Santi (1345 AD) still adorns the tiny church of San Michele, located in the central part of the Estate.

In 1967, Consorzio del Brunello di Montalcino was established with Castiglion del Bosco as one of its founding members. The organization was created as a voluntary association of producers who regulate and control the quality of Brunello di Montalcino production. In 1966, it became one of the first Italian wines to achieve the DOC (Controlled Denomination of Origin) title and in 1980 earned the DOCG (Controlled and Guaranteed Denomination of Origin) status.

Beginning in 2003, Castiglion del Bosco underwent a restoration project at the hands of new owners, Massimo and Chiara Ferragamo. Massimo Ferragamo is Chairman of Ferragamo USA and the youngest son of Wanda and Salvatore Ferragamo. In March 2022 the estate begins a new chapter in its history with its transfer to an international family office.
