= Brunellopoli =

2008 scandal

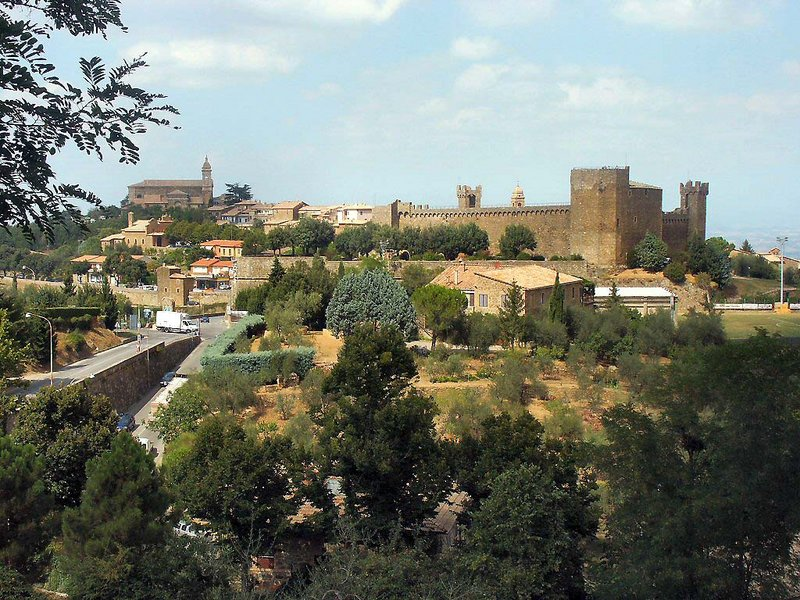
The village of Montalcino

Brunellopoli is the name given by Italian press for a scandal involving producers of Brunello di Montalcino under suspicion of wine fraud, first reported by Italian wine journalist Franco Ziliani and American wine critic James Suckling of Wine Spectator. The name "Brunellopoli" bears reference to Tangentopoli, or Bribesville, the Italian political scandal of the 1990s, while some English language reporters have applied the name "Brunellogate".

== Events ==
On March 21, 2008, Ziliani and Suckling reported that an investigation had begun into allegations that some Brunello producers had secretly and illegally added other types of grapes into what are by law wines made only from Sangiovese, allegedly to inflate production and increase profit on this typically expensive product.

The story received wider attention on April 4, 2008, when the Italian newsweekly L'Espresso reported that 20 firms were suspected of commercial fraud after investigators alleged that possibly millions of liters of Brunello di Montalcino had been cut with grapes of other varieties in violation of the purity requirements of Brunello's commercial certification. Vineyards were quarantined and hundreds of thousands of bottles were seized by investigating magistrates. In addition, prominent producers such as Argiano and Castello Banfi admitted that they were under investigation. While unlike earlier Italian scandals regarding tainted or fraudulent wine, there was no health risk feared, many observers suggested that great damage to the reputation of Brunello di Montalcino would result in lasting economic effects.

The prosecutor handling the case, Nino Calabrese, stated that the relevant commercial fraud charges carry a maximum sentences of up to six years in prison. In addition, any winemaker found guilty of violating the purity rules set down by Brunello's controlling body, the Consorzio del Vino Brunello, would probably mean expulsion from that group. The Consorzio has around 250 members, all of whom are bound to follow specific standards for winemaking, most importantly that only Sangiovese grapes are used. Some have asserted that the alleged substitute grapes used to cut wine production by fraudulent winemakers were cheap grapes that probably came from vineyards in southern Italy.

Some winemakers, such Argiano, have moved to decertify all the bottles that have thus far been impounded by the prosecutor's office in an effort to allow them to bring them to market, albeit under a different name and at a significantly lower price, rather than wait an indefinite length of time for a court resolution. "Our decision isn't because we feel guilty", said a representative of Argiano. "We can't wait passively for months. We need to be on the market."

In May, 2008, the U.S. government announced its intent to block imports of Brunello that do not come with laboratory proof that they are in fact 100% Sangiovese. A spokesman for the Alcohol and Tobacco Tax and Trade Bureau stated that the United States took this step only after earlier requests for information from the Italian government met with an inadequate response.

== Response from critics ==
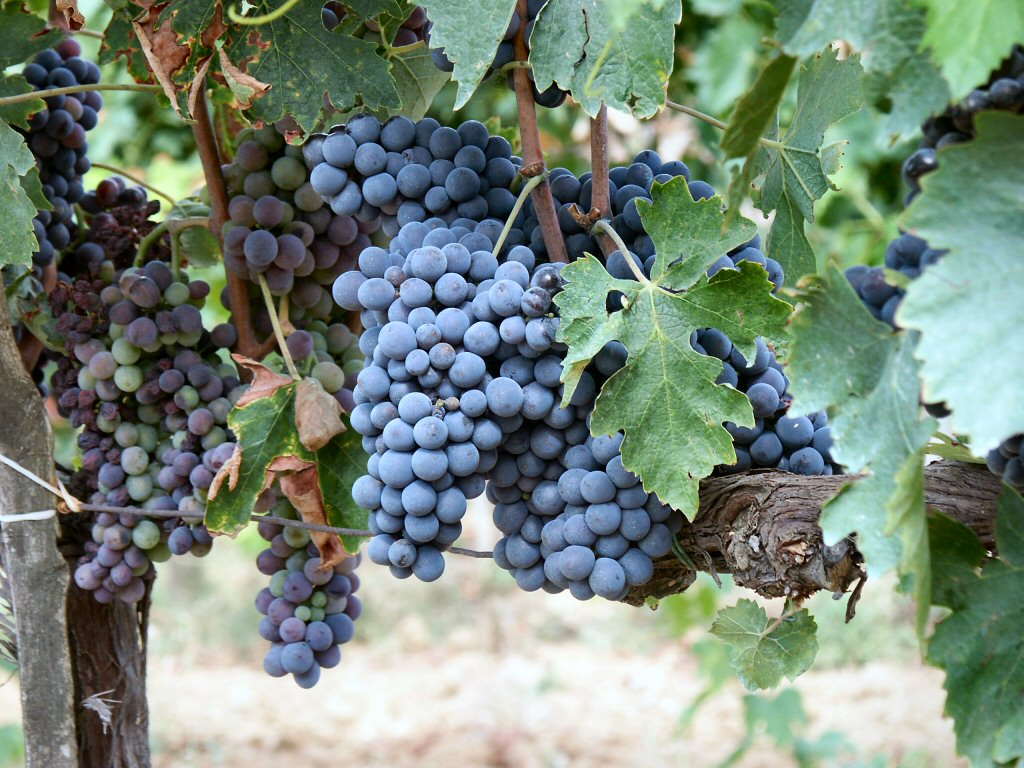
Sangiovese grapes growing in Montalcino

The scandal was hardly a surprise to some experts, as wine critic and author Kerin O'Keefe had been questioning Brunellos which were suspiciously dark and without the typical aromas of pure Sangiovese wines for years. O'Keefe wrote in 2003 that many of 1997 Brunellos she had tasted: "were so jammy it was hard to believe they were Brunello", in 2006 that: "illicit blending with other grapes, to make luminous ruby-garnet color unnaturally darker, is staunchly denied on all official fronts", and in 2007 that: "Doubts can only remain in the face of some of the darker, impenetrable Brunellos sometimes seen."

It has also been asserted that the addition of other grapes may have been for the purpose of broadening the market appeal of Brunello, which has been described as possessing idiosyncratic, rarefied characteristics that sometimes result in a "hard to drink" wine, though Brunellos generally are much praised (a Biondi Santi 1955 Brunello was the only wine from Italy selected as "best of the century" by a panel of experts in 1999).

Some experts, such as wine critics Ziliani and Eric Asimov, have expressed skepticism about the level of surprise and shock thus far expressed by industry members, asserting that rumors have been around for years regarding illegal varietals used by some producers in Montalcino. Eric Asimov wrote in 2006 that traditionally minded wineries "insist that some producers are already adding wine made from grapes other than Sangiovese to darken the color and to make the wine easier to drink at an early age".

== Aftermath ==
In October 2008, the Consorzio of Brunello di Montalcino moved to sue the newspapers L'espresso and La Repubblica for defamation in their reports of April 4, claiming that the articles had insinuated that Brunello is a health risk to consumers. Later that month, Brunello producers decided by vote to let the rules remain that Brunello di Montalcino be 100% Sangiovese, with only 4% of the producers voting to change the production code.

== See also ==
- Italian wine
- Tuscan wine
- Denominazione di origine controllata
- Protected designation of origin
