= Conterno Fantino =

Italian wine producer

Coordinates: 44.5852638°N 7.9699221°E

Azienda Agricola Conterno Fantino is an Italian wine producer from the Piemonte region in the district of Langhe. The winery is located in Monforte d'Alba and was established as partnership between Guido Fantino and the brothers Diego and Claudio Conterno. Proponents of techniques that include short maceration and the use of small French barriques, Conterno Fantino is considered a modernist producer of Barolo.

== Production ==
From a total vineyard area of 23 hectares (57 acres), the grape variety distribution is divided into 9 ha planted with Nebbiolo, 6.5 ha with Barbera, 4.5 with Dolcetto, 1.5 each of Cabernet Sauvignon and Chardonnay.

The estate has an annual total production of 125,000-140,000 bottles.
