= Aldo Conterno =

Italian winemaker

Coordinates: 44.6102563°N 7.9629878°E

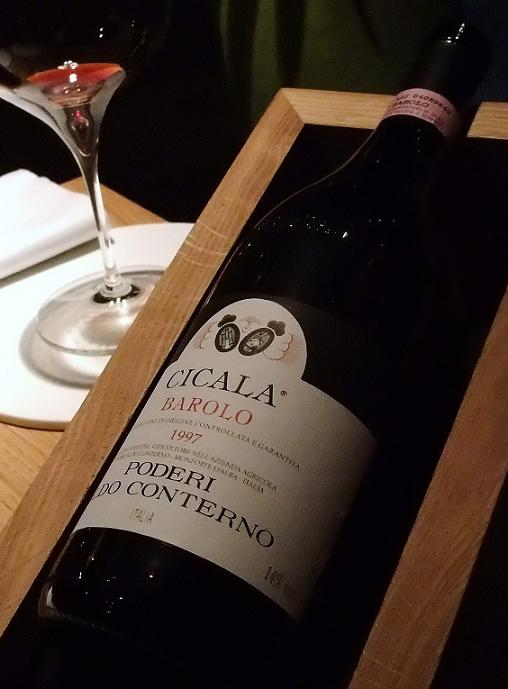
Detail of a 1997 Poderi Aldo Conterno Barolo Cicala.

Aldo Conterno (1931 – May 30, 2012) was an Italian winemaker of eponymous wine producer Poderi Aldo Conterno from the Piemonte region in the district of Langhe, chiefly producing Barolo wines. The winery is located in Monforte d'Alba, and Conterno was widely ranked among Piemonte's foremost producers.

== History ==
Aldo Conterno was born in 1931, the second son of Giacomo Conterno. In 1954, Aldo left Italy and joined two uncles who lived in San Francisco with a view to start a winery in Napa Valley. However, soon after his arrival to the United States he was drafted into the U.S. Army and served for two years in Korea, leaving with an honorable discharge and the rank of Specialist. Conterno returned to Italy after having spent near five years away.

Conterno and his older brother Giovanni assumed responsibility of the Giacomo Conterno estate in 1961, but the brothers eventually parted ways over conflicting philosophies on the production of Barolo wine, and in 1969 Aldo Conterno established Poderi Aldo Conterno. While Aldo Conterno had been inspired by the modernist innovations of Angelo Gaja of Barbaresco, and differs in style and method from the strict traditional methods of his brother Giovanni, Aldo Conterno wines are still considered largely traditional, but for a few exceptions.

Aldo Conterno has been described as Piemonte's most talented winemaker, and his wines have frequently been ranked among finest of the region, often with the emphasis on the balance. British wine publication Decanter rated Poderi Aldo Conterno among Italy's shortlist of Second Growths. The vineyards are now managed using organic methodology.

During the final years of his life Conterno was semi-retired, leaving control of production in the hands of his three sons, Franco, Stefano and Giacomo Conterno, with the latter in charge. Conterno died in Monforte d'Alba on May 30, 2012, aged 81.

== Winemaking practices and style ==
Among Barolo aficionados the wines of Aldo Conterno have earned a reputation for being "modernist" but with a blend of traditional Barolo winemaking practices. Like many traditional Barolo makers, Conterno favored long aging of his wines prior to their release to the public. For his Riserva Gran Bussia, the wine would typically be aged 3 years in large Slavonian oak casks followed by two years in stainless steel and another year in bottle prior to release. Unlike many modernist Barolo winemakers, Conterno did not use many small oak barriques however he did adapt to the modernist method of shortening the maceration time during fermentation and pressing the skins earlier than many traditional Barolo producers. These mixture of practices tended to create wines that are often described in wine literature as "powerfully structured" like many traditional producers but with a "depth of fruit" that is often described of modernist Barolo wines. Explaining why he insisted on the use of large, used botti and never apply French new barriques for oak influence, Conterno stated, "Vanilla, toast, spice and sweet tannins don't belong in Barolo".

Though committed to the focus on production of Barolo, Conterno remained among the Piemonte producers who were devoted to produce quality Barbera.

== Production ==
Poderi Aldo Conterno owns around 25 hectares (62 acres) of vineyard land in Bussia Soprana, about 400 meters above sea level. The estimated average production is 140,000 to 150,000 bottles per year. Wines are produced in the Denominazione di origine controllata zones of Barolo, Barbera d'Alba, Dolcetto d'Alba and Langhe.

- Barolo Granbussia

A blend of three Bussia vineyards, of approximately 70% Romirasco, 15% Cicala and 15% Colonnello. First produced as a test bottling in 1970, the inaugural commercial vintage was made in 1971 and consisted mostly of fruit from the Cicala and Colonnello vineyards. The wine is cellared for six years before release, spending up to three years in oak followed by two years in stainless steel. Around 600 cases are produced only in vintages where all three component vineyards are considered by the winery to have grown outstanding fruit.

- Barolo Romirasco

A vineyard with vines aged an average 50 years, the wine is aged in Slavonian oak for up to 28 months. The vineyard was purchased in 1980 by the estate, having previously only rented the land.

- Barolo Cicala

A vineyard with vines aged an average 50 years, the wine is aged in Slavonian oak for 28 to 30 months. Around 6 acres (2.4 ha) are owned by the estate, producing around 800 cases per vintage, with Aldo Conterno stating "Cicala contains less sand and more clay than his other vineyards and tends to make more powerful wines".

- Barolo Colonnello

A 1 hectare vineyard with vines aged an average 35–40 years old, the wine is aged in Slavonian oak for up to 28 months.

- Barolo Bussia Soprana

From vineyards other than the three cru vineyards, from vines of at least 20 years age.

- Conca Tre Pile

Barrique aged Barbera d'Alba from hillsides of Bussia Soprana, harvested from vines at least 45 years old.

- Il Masante

Dolcetto d'Alba

- Il Favot

Young vines Nebbiolo influenced by aging for 15 to 18 months in small Allier barriques. The difficult 2003 vintage was an exception, with Aldo Conterno deciding to produce no wines with the Barolo designation and declassifying them into the Il Favot label.

- Quartetto

A blend of 40% Nebbiolo grapes with 25% Cabernet Sauvignon, 25% Merlot and 10% Barbera.

- Bussiador

A Chardonnay, aged in barrique for 6 to 8 months.

- Printanié

A Chardonnay, aged in stainless steel for 5 to 6 months.

- Bussianella

A sparkling wine produced from a grape indigenous to Piedmont, Freisa.
