= Kerin O'Keefe =

American wine critic and author

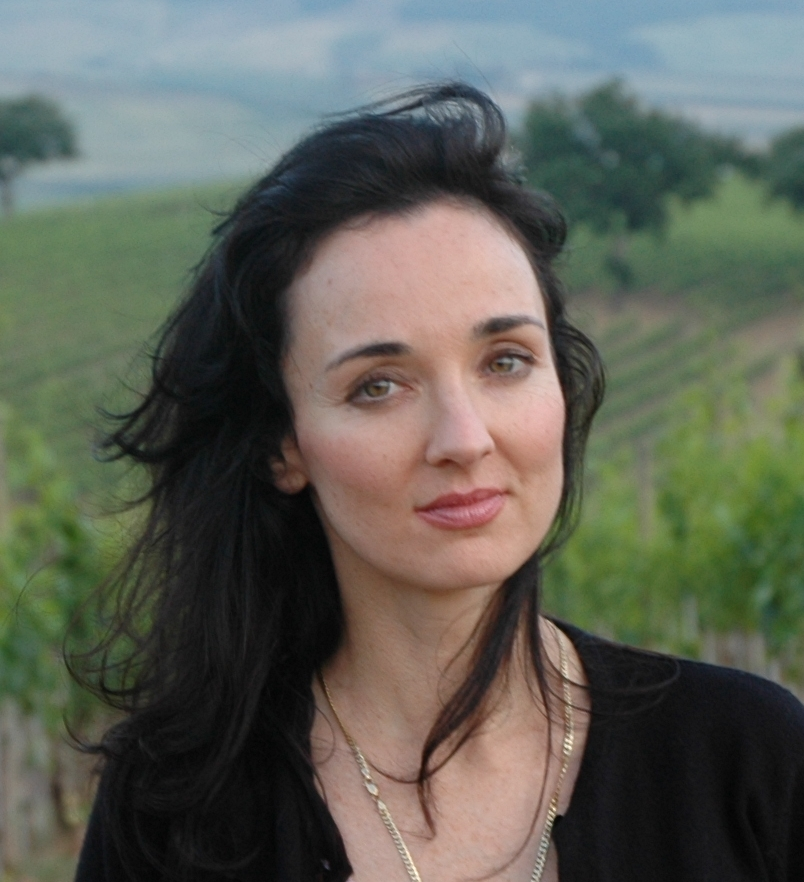
- Born: Boston
- Occupations: Wine Critic and Author
- Website: kerinokeefe.com

Kerin O'Keefe is a wine critic specialized in Italian wine and author of four books. She reviews wines and writes articles on the growing areas, wines and producers for kerinokeefe.com.

O'Keefe was Italian Editor for Wine Enthusiast from May 2013 until June 2022. From 2002 to 2013, she wrote regularly on Italian wine for Decanter and from 2004 for The World of Fine Wine. She was also Contributing Editor for The Wine News from 2003 to 2009.

== Career ==
Kerin O’Keefe holds a degree in English literature from the University of Massachusetts Amherst, and also studied English and American literature for a year at the University of East Anglia. O'Keefe has a keen interest in fine Italian wine made from autochthonous grape varieties. She has been acknowledged to be "one of the great wine commentators on Italy" and "a critic in the best sense of the word, not shy with her opinions, which she offers without polemics or bluster."

She won the Premio Consorzio Brunello di Montalcino in 2008 for her cover article "Brunello de-con-struct-ed" in the Oct-Nov 2007 issue of The Wine News. She was named Honorary Knight by the Ordine dei Cavalieri del Tartufo e dei Vini di Alba on April 7, 2017. She received the International Communicator Award from Assoenologi (the Italian Enologists Association) for her work in promoting Italian wines and her expertise in communicating the nuances of Italy's wine regions to a global audience.

== Books ==
Her first book was published in Italian by Luigi Veronelli in 2004: Franco Biondi Santi. Il gentleman del Brunello. She authored the English edition of the book in 2005, Franco Biondi Santi. The Gentleman of Brunello, a recipient of a Gourmand Wine Books Award.

Brunello di Montalcino - Understanding and Appreciating One of Italy's Greatest Wines, (University of California Press, 2012), gave Montalcino and its wines the in-depth treatment they deserved.

Her latest book, Barolo and Barbaresco - The King and Queen of Italian Wine, (University of California Press, 2014), filled a gap in the wine literature by helping consumers understand the differences among the various sub-zones of Barolo and Barbaresco.

Kerin O'Keefe
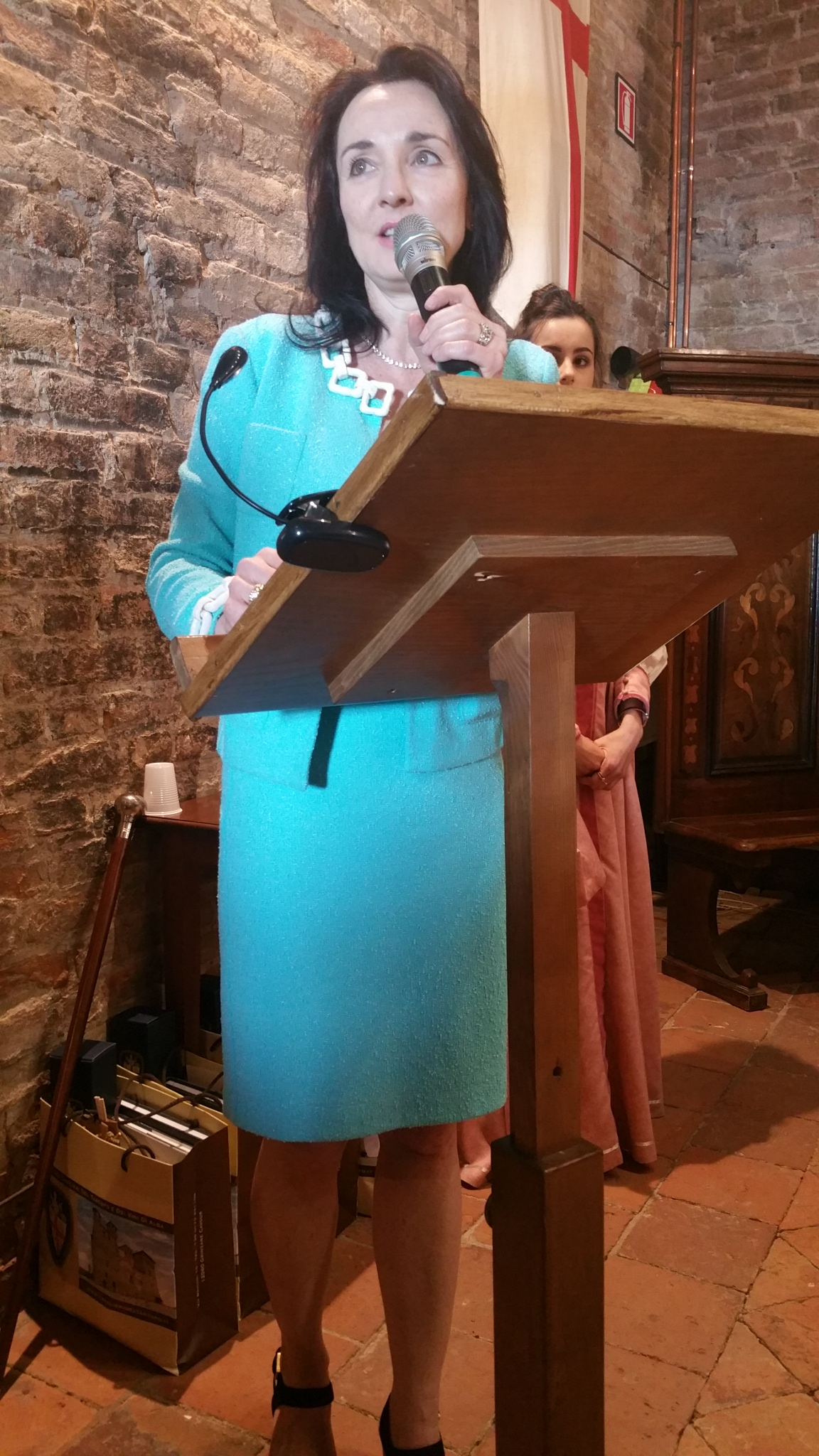
- Speaking at Grinzane Cavour castle to the Ordine dei Cavalieri del Tartufo e dei Vini di Alba

== Contentions ==
In The Times Literary Supplement Tim Crane put her in the Clive Coates/Michael Broadbent camp of wine critics, rather than in the Robert Parker camp of "loud and fruity descriptions".

Her article "Rebels without a cause? The demise of Super-Tuscans" was discussed by Eric Asimov in The New York Times and spurred a lively debate on the merits of Super-Tuscans.

The Brunellopoli scandal was not a surprise for O'Keefe, as she had been questioning Brunellos which were suspiciously dark and without the typical aromas of pure Sangiovese wines for years. O'Keefe wrote in 2003 that many of 1997 Brunellos she had tasted: "were so jammy it was hard to believe they were Brunello", in 2006 that: "illicit blending with other grapes, to make luminous ruby-garnet color unnaturally darker, is staunchly denied on all official fronts" and in 2007 that: "Doubts can only remain in the face of some of the darker, impenetrable Brunellos sometimes seen".

O'Keefe opposes the view held by many about the so-called American Palate, or the preference for highly oaked, sweet and powerful wines. She maintains it is a crass stereotype to believe that an entire nation has a uniform taste with respect to wine. She argued instead that US wine drinkers have shown a growing appetite for more balanced and drinkable wines.

O'Keefe has also been critical of the tendency of some Italian wine producers to "equate what they call un vino importante with overwhelming sensations of French oak."

== Bibliography ==
- Franco Biondi Santi. Il gentleman del Brunello, Veronelli Editore, 2004. ISBN 8872501229
- Franco Biondi Santi. The gentleman of Brunello, Veronelli Editore, 2005. ISBN 8872501156
- Brunello di Montalcino. Understanding and Appreciating One of Italy's Greatest Wines, University of California Press, 2012. ISBN 9780520265646
- Barolo and Barbaresco. The King and Queen of Italian Wine, University of California Press, 2014. ISBN 9780520273269
