= Gaja (wine) =

Italian wine

Coordinates: 44.7259°N 8.0807°E

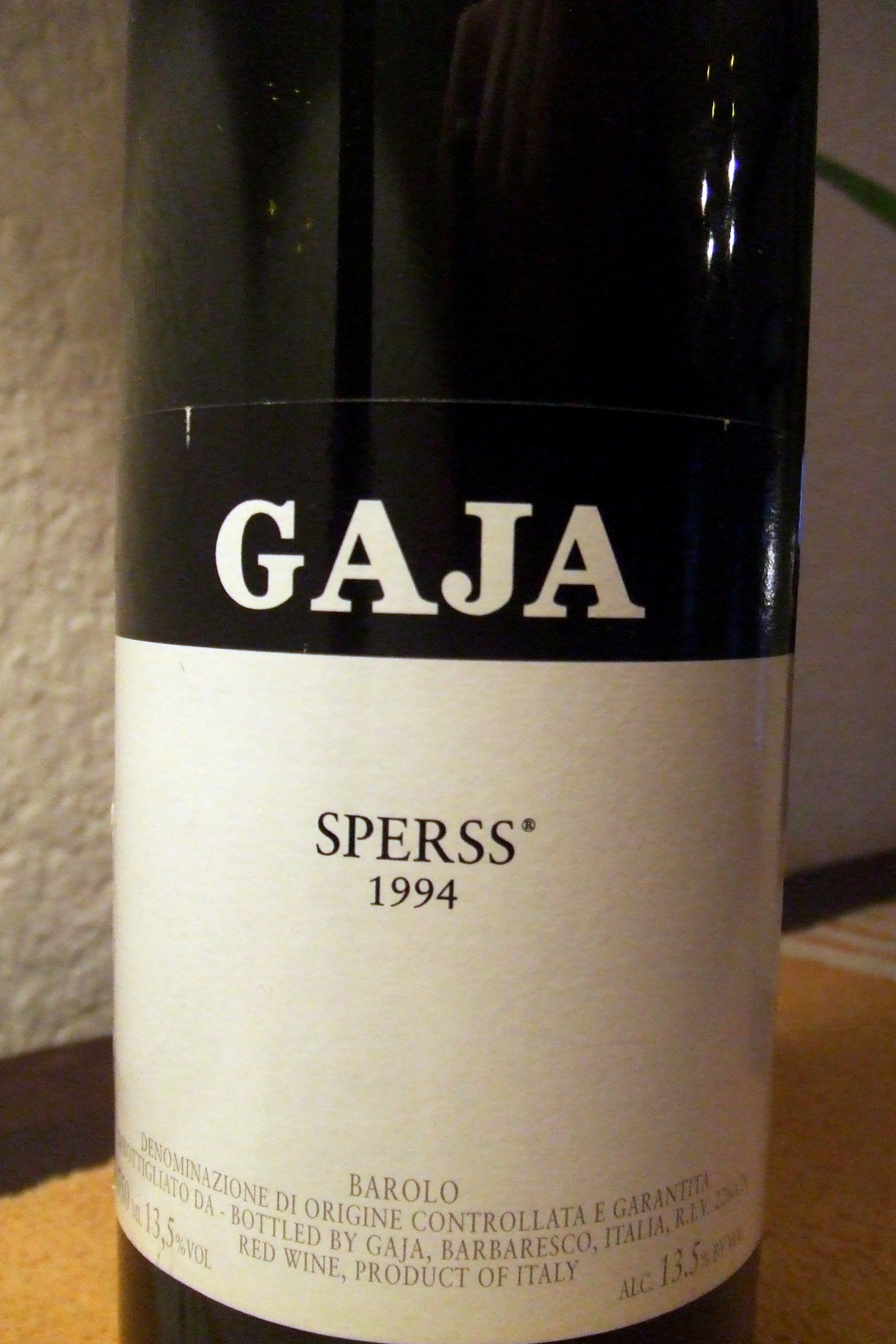
A bottle of 1994 Gaja Sperss, then a Barolo DOCG

Gaja is an Italian wine producer from the Piemonte region in the district of Langhe, chiefly producing a number of Barbaresco and Barolo wines, and later diversified into Brunello di Montalcino and "Super Tuscan" production. Its current owner and president Angelo Gaja is credited with developing techniques that have revolutionised winemaking in Italy, and terms such as "the undisputed king of Barbaresco", and "the man who dragged Piedmont into the modern world" have been applied to him, and whose Barbaresco wine is considered a status symbol on a par with Château Lafite Rothschild or Champagne Krug.

Additionally, Gaja Distribuzione imports to Italy high-end wines from elsewhere in the world including Champagne, Sauternes and Bordeaux, Spanish and Californian wine, as well as spirits and glassware.

== History ==
The Gaja winery was founded in 1859 by Giovanni Gaja, the Gaja family having arrived from Spain during the 17th century. The family Gaja opened a tavern in Barbaresco, serving its wines with the food. At the end of the 19th century, Gaja wines were bottled and supplied to the Italian army in Abyssinia.

In 1937, Giovanni Gaja, grandson of the founder, first put the name Gaja in big red letters on his bottles' labels. The firm progressed following World War II as Giovanni Gaja made a significant series of vineyard purchases in terms of scale and vineyard quality. Also cited as an important influence to the firm's early success is the mother of Giovanni Gaja, Clotilda Rey, who instilled the principles of working to achieve high quality to attract the desired clientele, and set high prices to manifest the prestige of the product.

=== Angelo Gaja ===
Angelo Gaja (born 1940), great-grandson of Giovanni Gaja, began his career with the company in 1961 at the age of 21. He had completed his studies in wine making at the Enological Institute in Alba and at the University of Montpellier in France, and held a degree in economics from the University of Turin. At the time there were only about 100 people producing Barbaresco and Barolo. Thanks to his family's acquisitions, the young Gaja was already a major vineyard owner in Barbaresco.

Following several trips to France and ongoing disputes with his father, Angelo Gaja introduced several practices to the region over the following years that were revolutionary to the vinification of Nebbiolo. In 1961 he began the first experiments with green harvest or diradamento. Single vineyard production was started with Sorí San Lorenzo in 1967, Sorí Tildin in 1970 and Costa Russi in 1978. Since 1970 Gaja has employed the eminent oenologist Guido Rivella. Gaja is also credited with introducing to Piemonte malolactic fermentation, from the 1975–1976 vintage implementing French barriques ten years after initial experiments, bringing in thermo-controllable fermentation equipment and French grape varieties, and eventually grand cru prices. Giovanni Gaja opposed his son's use of new barriques and the decision to plant French grape varieties.

In 1977 Gaja formed Gaja Distribuzione, an importer and distributor of wines and wine accessories from other countries.

In 1978 the Darmagi vineyard in Barbaresco, a prime Nebbiolo site, was planted with Cabernet Sauvignon. Gaja stated this was done not because of his love for Cabernet Sauvignon, but from the belief that only by making a great Cabernet, aged in barriques, could he persuade the world that Italian wines were capable of greatness. And only by succeeding on terms accepted by the rest of the world could he draw attention to the great wines made from Italy's indigenous grapes. This was followed in 1979 when The Gaia & Rey vineyard in Treiso was planted with Chardonnay. Later in 1983, Sauvignon Blanc was planted in the Alteni di Brassica vineyard in Barbaresco.

Considered a modernist in a traditional region, Gaja was criticised for his approach in the early years, but unlike many other modernists, Gaja is judicious in the use of new oak. Gaja ferments his wines for up to 30 days, a traditional method instead of the modernist five-day fermentations, and although he employs barriques (⅓ new oak) for the first year of aging, the process is finished in big botti (traditional 10-100+hL casks, Slavonian oak or historically chestnut, some of which c. 80–120 years old). Piemonte producers who became inspired by Gaja's methods include Renato Ratti and Aldo Conterno, while Bruno Giacosa is considered by many to be Gaja's "polar opposite".

Cabernet is to John Wayne, as Nebbiolo is to Marcello Mastroianni. Cabernet has a strong personality, open, easily understood and dominating. If Cabernet were a man, he would do his duty every night in the bedroom, but always in the same way. Nebbiolo, on the other hand, would be the brooding, quiet man in the corner, harder to understand but infinitely more complex.

— Angelo Gaja

The reputation of Gaja has evolved over the years as his uncompromising policies have produced tremendous results. He refused to sell 12,000 cases (1,100 hl) of 1984 Barbaresco under the Gaja label because the quality did not meet his standards. He sold the wine off in bulk, to the horror of his family. His stature has also been strengthened by commendations such as the Wine Spectator proclamation that the 1985 Gaja Barbarescos were "the finest wines ever made in Italy", the selection for the 1997 Wine Spectator Distinguished Service Award, and for "1998 Decanter Man of the Year".

In 1988 Gaja returned to Barolo with the acquisition of 70 acres (28 ha) of property, having previously rented vineyards there and then discontinued the activity when the strategy called for focus on self-owned single vineyards. The Barolo Sperss was first released in 1992. Further acquisitions saw Gaja own property in Montalcino Tuscany with the Pieve Santa Restituta estate in 1994, Gromis property in La Morra for the production of Barolo Conteisa Cerequio in 1995 and the Ca'Marcanda property in Bolgheri, Tuscany, in 1996.

Angelo Gaja has declared he will not expand the firm's holding outside Italy's borders, although in 1989 he came close to a joint venture with the Napa Valley magnate Robert Mondavi. He eventually declined, reflecting that it would be "like a mosquito having sex with an elephant: very dangerous and not much pleasure".

With the 1996 vintage, Angelo Gaja intentionally declassified his DOCG Barbaresco and Barolo wines, with the exception of one, moving them to the lower DOC class Langhe Rosso. Denying rumours contending that this unprecedented decision was stemmed from a desire to blend his Barbarescos and Barolos with international grapes, Gaja stated that among the reasons was that he wanted to remain free to include small percentages of Barbera in the wines (typically only 5 or 6 percent) as a "correction for acidity". Gaja explained further, "I know what many journalists and others in the industry have said and continue to say, but my decision was actually made in support of Barbaresco. My family focused on Barbaresco made with Nebbiolo from 14 of the estate's vineyards, and it has always been the firm's historic wine. But while our single vineyard bottlings grew in prestige, our Barbaresco was suddenly referred to as normale or "basic", and considered inferior to the mono-crus, which I never intended. My family has been making wine and striving for excellence for over 150 years. I don't want anything we make to be considered 'regular'. So now I have one Barbaresco only."

Past the age of 70, Angelo Gaja has passed on the routine running of the firm to his daughters, Gaia and Rossana Gaja and Son, Giovanni Gaja, although has not yet declared himself retired.

==== Fifth generation of winemaking ====
Since 2004, the primary figurehead and executive’s of the Gaja vineyard are his children, Gaia Gaja, Rossana Gaja, and Giovanni Gaja. Under their supervision, reclassification of such wines as Sorì Tilden, Sori San Lorenzo and Costa Russi, and Sperrs; these wines are currently produced as DOCG Barbaresco and Barolo respectively.

== Production ==
Gaja produces in all 18 different wines from vineyards in Piedmont 100 hectares (250 acres), within the Barbaresco zone Barbaresco and Treiso and the Barolo zone Serralunga d'Alba and La Morra, in Montalcino 27 hectares (67 acres) and Bolgheri 110 hectares (270 acres), with a total annual production of 350,000 bottles.

=== Barbaresco ===
- Gaja Barbaresco DOCG

The Gaja estate flagship wine which has been produced since its founding in 1859.

It is a 100% Nebbiolo varietal wine sourced from 14 different Barbaresco zone vineyards. It has 12 months of barrique aging and then 12 months of aging in large oak casks.

- Costa Russi

A single vineyard acquired by the Gaja family in 1967. The name comes from the term "costa", the side of a hill facing the sun, and "Russi" a nickname of the previous owner.

Its grape variety distribution from vintage 1996 to 2011 was c. 95% Nebbiolo and 5% Barbera, with 12 months in barriques and then 12 months in large oak casks. From 1996 to 2011 it was classified Langhe Nebbiolo DOC. Starting with the 2013 vintage the Costa Russi along with the other two single vineyard Barbaresco wines saw the removal of the 5% Barbera and a return to being classified as Barbaresco DOCG.

- Sorì Tildìn

A vineyard acquired by the Gaja family in 1967, first produced as a single-vineyard wine in 1970. "Sorì" is a Piedmontese word for "hilltop with southern exposure" and "Tildìn" was a nickname of Clotilde Rey, Angelo Gaja's grandmother.

Its grape variety distribution from vintage 1996 to 2011 was c. 95% Nebbiolo and 5% Barbera, with 12 months in barriques and then 12 months in large oak casks. From 1996 to 2011 it was classified Langhe Nebbiolo DOC. Starting with the 2013 vintage the Sori Tildin along with the other two single vineyard Barbaresco wines saw the removal of the 5% Barbera and a return to being classified as Barbaresco DOCG.

- Sorì San Lorenzo

A vineyard bought from the parish of Alba in 1964, named after San Lorenzo, the patron saint of Alba's cathedral.

Its grape variety distribution from vintage 1996 to 2011 was c. 95% Nebbiolo and 5% Barbera, with 12 months in barriques and then 12 months in large oak casks. From 1996 to 2011 it was classified Langhe Nebbiolo DOC. Starting with the 2013 vintage the Costa Russi along with the other two single vineyard Barbaresco wines saw the removal of the 5% Barbera and a return to being classified as Barbaresco DOCG.

=== Barolo ===
- Sperss

Having purchased grapes from Serralunga for the Gaja Barolo until 1961, this ceased with the decision to produce only from estate-owned vineyards. In 1988, Gaja bought the vineyard. The name is Piedmontese for "nostalgia", indicating a longing to return to the making of Barolo after several years of absence.

Its grape variety distribution is c. 100% Nebbiolo, with 12 months in barriques followed by 12 months in large oak casks. Starting with the 1996 vintage it was classified Langhe Nebbiolo DOC, but with the 2013 vintage has returned to Barolo DOCG status.

- Conteisa (Conteisa Cerequio)

The name is Piedmontese for "quarrel", referring to a historic dispute between the communes La Morra and Barolo, both claiming the Cerequio land.

Its grape variety distribution is c. 100% Nebbiolo, with 12 months in barriques followed by 12 months in large oak casks. It is classified Langhe Nebbiolo DOC.

- Dagromis

Named after the Gromis family which owned the vineyard in the comune of La Morra throughout the 19th century, before acquired by the Gaja family. It is blended with fruit from another Gaja-owned vineyard in Serralunga.

It is a 100% Nebbiolo varietal wine, with 12 months in barriques followed by 12 months in large oak casks. It is classified Barolo DOCG.

=== Other ===
- Darmagi

Planted in 1978, the name, meaning "what a shame" or "pity!", is said to be a comment made by Angelo Gaja's father, Giovanni Gaja, reflecting on Cabernet vines planted on a prime Nebbiolo site.

Its grape variety distribution is c. 95% Cabernet Sauvignon, 3% Merlot, and 2% Cabernet Franc, aged 6 to 8 months in barriques, then 12 months in large oak casks. It is classified a Cabernet Sauvignon Langhe DOC.

- Sito Moresco

Several estate-owned vineyards, among which the 10-hectare (25-acre) Sito Moresco vineyard in Barbaresco, with the name "Moresco's site" referring to the former owner of the vineyard.

Its grape variety distribution is c. 35% Nebbiolo, 35% Merlot, 30% Cabernet Sauvignon, aged 18 months in barriques, then at least six months of bottle aging. It is classified Langhe DOC.

- Gaia & Rey

The Gaja estate's first white wine, sourced from the Gaia & Rey vineyard which was planted in 1979. It is named for Angelo Gaja's oldest daughter, Gaia Gaja, and his grandmother, Clotilde Rey.

It is a 100% Chardonnay varietal wine, with 6–8 months of barrique aging with malolactic fermentation. It is classified Langhe.

- Alteni di Brassica

The vineyards were planted with Sauvignon blanc in 1983. The name comes from the alteni, small stone walls that in the past surrounded the orchards in the area, and brassica, yellow flowers that cover the vineyards in the spring.

It is a 100% Sauvignon blanc varietal with 6–8 months of barrique aging with malolactic fermentation. It is classified Langhe.

- Rossj-Bass

The wine is produced from grapes grown in multiple estate-owned vineyards. The Rossj vineyard, planted in 1984, is named for Angelo Gaja's youngest daughter Rossana "Rossj" Gaja.

Its grape variety distribution is predominantly Chardonnay with a small portion of Sauvignon blanc, aged in barrique for 6–7 months with malolactic fermentation. It is classified Langhe.

- Grappa

Gaja produces three grappas named Sperss, Gaia & Rey and Darmagi, using grapes from their most famous vineyards. Their property Castello di Barbaresco is the distillation and production site. They are distilled from Nebbiolo, Chardonnay and Cabernet Sauvignon, respectively. The grappa is mostly seen in half bottles, and is marketed using different colors for each label. A visible barrel aging is seen in the Sperss grappa, perhaps as a nod to the traditionalist disappointment beholden in pursuing French-style standards of brandy vinification. Gaja is one of the most innovative wineries in grappa production, and has inspired grappas such as Nonino's barrique aged Chardonnay. There are also produced Grappa di Barbera and Grappa di Barolo.

=== Tuscany ===
==== Pieve Santa Restituta ====
In 1994 Gaja acquired its first property in Toscana, Pieve Santa Restituta in Montalcino. The property's 16 hectares (40 acres) of vineyards producing two wines that are Brunello di Montalcino, with exceptions such as in 2005 which was estimated by Gaja as a lesser vintage, and a single Brunello was produced.

- Rennina

This wine is sourced from three non-contiguous vineyard sites, located on a portion of the Pieve Santa Restituta estate that was named "vicus Rennina" according to an 8th-century document.

It is a 100% Sangiovese varietal wine with one year in barriques and one year in large oak casks, followed by at least two years of bottle aging. It is classified Brunello di Montalcino DOCG.

- Sugarille

A wine sourced with fruit from the Sugarille vineyard which was first recorded in the inventory of Pieve parish church in 1547.

It is a 100% Sangiovese varietal wine with one year in barriques and one year in large oak casks, followed by at least two years of bottle aging. It is classified Brunello di Montalcino DOCG.

==== Ca'Marcanda ====
Located in Castagneto Carducci in Bolgheri, in the Maremma, the estate was bought by Gaja in 1996 when vines were planted, and the estate extends 100 hectares (250 acres). Three wines are produced.

- Promis

The name stems from the Latin abbreviation, promissio, meaning promise. The grapes are cultivated in the terre brune dark soils of the Ca'Marcanda vineyard.

Its grape variety distribution is c. 55% Merlot, 35% Syrah and 10% Sangiovese, aged in somewhat used barriques for 12 months followed by several months of bottle aging before release. It is classified IGT Toscana IGT.

- Magari

The estate's second wine, the name may translate to "perhaps" or "if only" and is from fruit grown in a combination of terre brune and terre blanche, white soils with stones and pebbles.

Its grape variety distribution is c. 50% Merlot, 25% Cabernet Sauvignon, 25% Cabernet Franc, aged in new and somewhat used barriques for 18 months followed by no less than six months of bottle aging. It is classified IGT Toscana [23][23][23][23][23].

- Camarcanda

The name, from the winery name Ca’Marcanda, is a Piedmontese term for "house of endless negotiations", in reference to long-lasting period it took to persuade the previous owners to sell the estate. The vineyard is from one of the stoniest sites of the Ca'Marcanda estate, 100% terre bianche.

Its grape variety distribution is c. 50% Merlot, 40% Cabernet Sauvignon, 10% Cabernet Franc, aged in new and somewhat used barriques for 18 months followed by at least twelve months of bottle aging. It is classified Bolgheri DOC

- Vistamare

The white wine produced in the Ca'Marcanda estate, it is a savory, floral blend of both Italian and French varieties. The blend is composed of 40% Vermentino, 40% Viognier, and 20% Fiano. The climate of coastal Tuscany allows the common Southern French grape Viognier to ripen fully, while receiving vital acidity from the traditional Italian blending grapes. The name evokes the typical maritime vista of the central Italian coast, yet it is the freshness and vitality of the wine which supports the name, not the location of the vineyard sites, which lie over six miles from the ocean.
