= Giacomo Conterno =

Italian winery

Coordinates: 44.5813469°N 7.964177°E

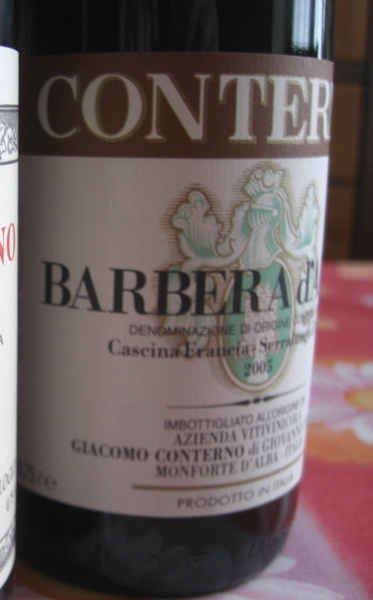
Detail of a Giacomo Conterno Barbera d'Alba Cascina Francia.

Giacomo Conterno is an Italian wine producer from the Piemonte region in the district of Langhe. From a winery located in Monforte d'Alba, the Barolo and Barbera wines are made by traditionalist methods and are widely considered among the finest produced in the Barolo zone.

== History ==
From unclear descriptions of its origin, the Cantine Giacomo Conterno production of Barolo may have begun in 1908 with the founding of Giovanni Conterno's tavern in San Giuseppe near Monforte d'Alba, or after his son Giacomo Conterno returned from service in World War I, with the first Barolo riserva either bottled in 1912 or 1920. Notwithstanding, Conterno coming from a family with viticultural roots in the region going back to the 18th century, is considered one of the first small Barolo producers to bottle an own wine, beginning in the 1920s during a time when Barolo was normally sold in cask or demijohn and intended for early drinking. Giovanni Conterno died in 1934 and Giacomo Conterno created a Barolo with vast aging potential, named Monfortino for the home village Monforte d'Alba. For 54 years two Barolos, a normale and riserva, were produced from purchased grapes, made by the motto that a Barolo at the time of bottling should be "undrinkable", though be a great bottle after twenty, thirty, forty years.

Giacomo Conterno's sons, Giovanni and Aldo Conterno, formally took over the estate in 1961. With the older Giovanni Conterno already responsible for winemaking since the 1959 vintage, Aldo Conterno eventually parted over conflicting winemaking philosophies with his brother, and founded his own estate Poderi Aldo Conterno in 1969. While Giacomo Conterno wines represent the strictly traditional Barolo winemaking philosophy, Aldo Conterno too shares the view that the "modernist" approach of using small barriques in combination with shorter maceration times undermines the character of Barolo and add a vanillin sweetness to the wine that overrides the inherent fruit of the nebbiolo.

In 1974 Giovanni Conterno purchased the Cascina Francia vineyard in Serralunga, bringing an end to the era of purchasing fruit from local farmers. The first vintage of wine made from own vineyard was 1978, though the name Cascina Francia did not appear on the label of the normale until the 1980 vintage.

Giovanni Conterno's youngest son Roberto began to work by his father's side in 1988, and after Giovanni Conterno died at 75 in February 2004, Roberto Conterno continued the family industry in the strict traditionalist fashion. In 2008 Roberto Conterno purchased a vineyard in Serralunga's Cerretta, from which wine was produced beginning with the 2008 vintage. In 2015 Roberto bought from Cantina Gigi Rosso the prized nine-hectare Arione vineyard, next to Cascina Francia. The new vineyard includes just over 3.5 ha Nebbiolo da Barolo, just over 1ha Nebbiolo d'Alba and just over 1ha Barbera d'Alba.

== Production ==
While the Barolo riserva Monfortino is only produced in exceptional years, the Barolo Cascina Francia is not made every year either, exemplified by the difficult 2002 vintage of rain and hail, which allowed only for a small amount of grapes acceptable to make Monfortino, but not Cascina Francia, the first time that a riserva was produced but no normale.

The Nebbiolo and Barbera grapes come from the 16-hectare (40-acre) vineyard Cascina Francia in Serralunga d'Alba, entirely owned by the Giacomo Conterno estate.

From the 2009 vintage wines are forthcoming from the newly acquired 3 ha (7.4-acre) Cerretta vineyard holding with 2 ha of Nebbiolo and 1 ha of Barbera, with the Nebbiolo classified as Langhe Nebbiolo. The wines are to be vinified in the same traditional manner as the Cascina Francia wines.

- Barbera d'Alba DOC Cascina Francia

Aged 2 years in botti (traditional large casks). The production is 1,800 to 2,100 cases (160 to 190 hL).

- Barolo DOCG Cascina Francia

Not made in less than satisfactory vintages, the wine macerates on its skins for 3–4 weeks at controlled temperatures below 30 °C and is aged 4 years in botti. The production is ca. 1,800 cases (160 hL).

- Barolo riserva DOCG Monfortino

Made only in exceptional vintages, the wine macerates on its skins for up to five weeks with no temperature control regardless of how high the fermentation temperatures may go, and is aged 7 years in botti. Baudains, Richard, Decanter.com (May 23, 2006). The production is ca. 580 cases (52 hL).
