= Garrick =

Garrick may refer to:

- Garrick (name), for the name's origin and people with either the surname or given name
  - David Garrick (1717–1779), English actor
- Garrick Club, a London gentlemen's club named in honour of David Garrick
- Garrick Theatre (disambiguation), various theatres named after David Garrick
- Garrick Collection, early printed editions of English drama bequeathed by David Garrick to the British Museum
- Garrick F.C., defunct Sheffield based football club
- Garrick or Lichia amia, a fish species
- Jay Garrick, a DC Comics superhero and the first to use the name Flash
- Garrick, Saskatchewan, Canada, a hamlet
- Garrick's Ait, an ait or island in the River Thames in England
- Garrick Bar, one of the oldest public houses in Belfast, Northern Ireland
- Garrick, a play by the Catalan mime comedy group Tricicle
- Portrait of David Garrick, a 1770 painting by Thomas Gainsborough

== See also ==
- Carrick (disambiguation)
- Garak (disambiguation)
- Garrick/Milne Prize, a biennial art prize that was discontinued after 2005
