= David Garrick =

English actor, playwright, theatre manager and producer (1716-1779)

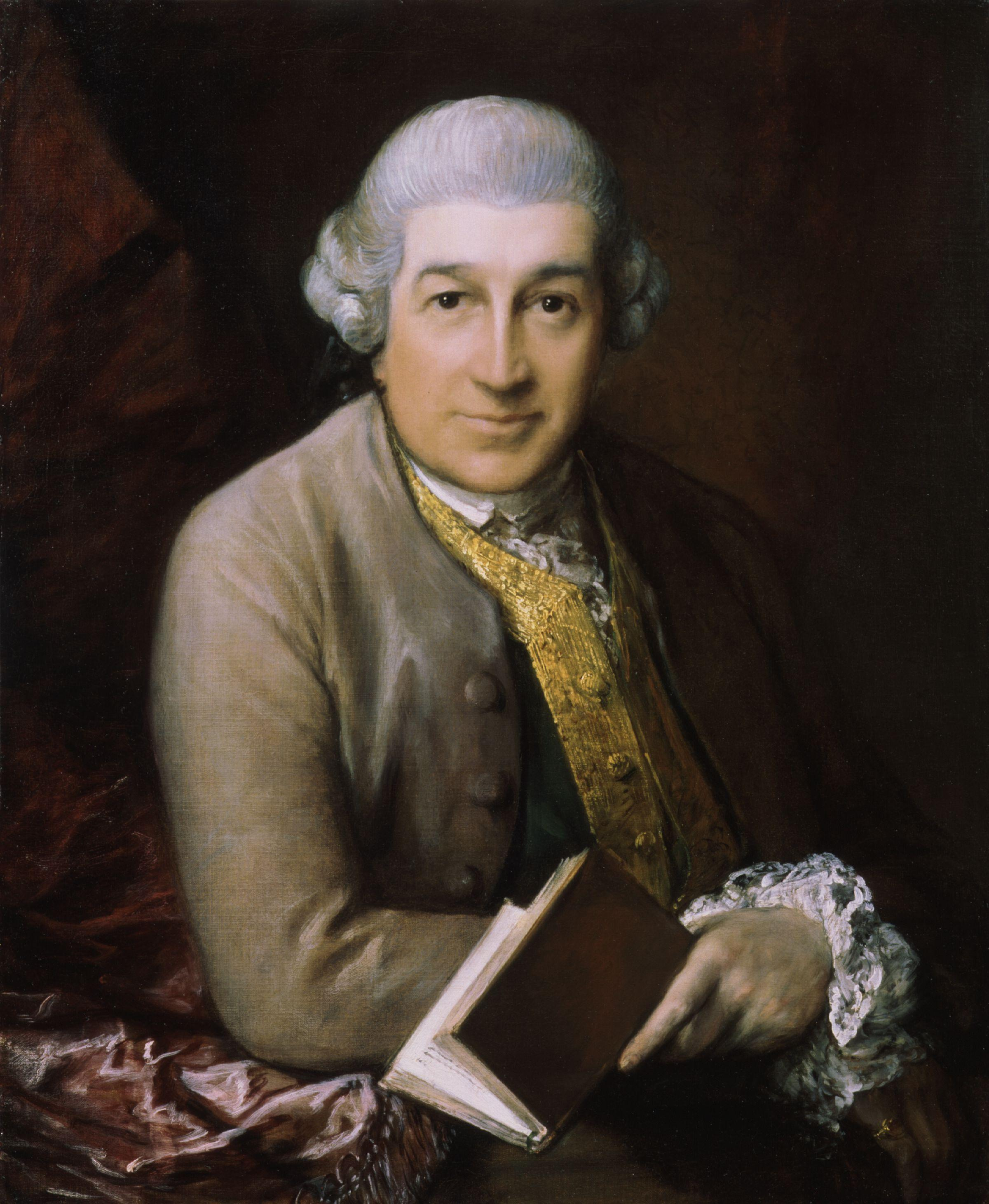
- Portrait of David Garrick (1770)
- Born: 19 February 1716; Widemarsh Street, Hereford
- Died: 20 January 1779 (aged 62); Adelphi Buildings, London
- Resting place: Westminster Abbey
- Occupation: Actor
- Spouse: Eva Marie Veigel

Signature
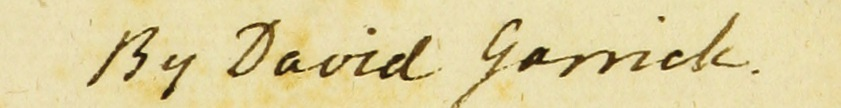

David Garrick (19 February 1716 – 20 January 1779) was an English actor who wrote, produced and influenced nearly all aspects of 18th century European theatrical practice, and was a pupil and friend of Samuel Johnson. He appeared in several amateur theatricals, and with his appearance in the title role of Shakespeare's Richard III, audiences and managers began to take notice.

Impressed by his portrayals of Richard III and several other roles, Charles Fleetwood engaged Garrick for a season at the Theatre Royal, Drury Lane in the West End. He remained with the Drury Lane company for the next five years and purchased a share of the theatre with James Lacy. This purchase inaugurated 29 years of Garrick's management of the Drury Lane, during which time it rose to prominence as one of the leading theatres in Europe. At his death, three years after he retired from Drury Lane and the stage, he was given a lavish public funeral at Westminster Abbey where he was buried in Poets' Corner.

As an actor, Garrick promoted realistic acting that departed from the bombastic style that was entrenched when he first came to prominence. His acting delighted many audiences and his direction of many of the top actors of the English stage influenced their styles as well. During his tenure as manager of Drury Lane, Garrick also sought to reform audience behaviour. While this led to some discontent among the theatre-going public, many of his reforms eventually did take hold. Garrick also sought reform in production matters, bringing an overarching consistency to productions that included set design, costumes and even special effects.

Garrick's influence extended into the literary side of theatre as well. Critics are almost unanimous in saying he was not a good playwright, but his work in bringing Shakespeare to contemporary audiences is notable. In addition, he adapted many older plays in the repertoire that might have been forgotten. These included many plays of the Restoration era. Indeed, while influencing the theatre towards a better standard he also gained a better reputation for theatre people. This accomplishment led Samuel Johnson to remark that "his profession made him rich and he made his profession respectable."

== Early life ==
Garrick was born at the Angel Inn, Widemarsh Street, Hereford in 1716 into a family with French Huguenot roots in Languedoc, southern France. His grandfather, David Garric, was in Bordeaux in 1685 when the Edict of Nantes was revoked, removing the rights of Protestants in France. Grandfather Garric fled to London and his son, Peter, who was an infant at the time, was smuggled out by a nurse when he was deemed old enough to make the journey. David Garrick became a British subject upon his arrival in Britain, and later Anglicised his name to Garrick. Some time after David Garrick's birth the family moved to Lichfield, home to his mother. His father, a captain in the army, was a recruiting officer stationed in Gibraltar through most of young Garrick's childhood.

Garrick was the third of seven children and his younger brother, George, served as an aide to David for the remainder of his life. The playwright and actor Charles Dibdin writes that George, when on occasion discovering his brother's absence, would often inquire "Did David want me?" Upon Garrick's death in 1779, it was noted that George died 48 hours later, leading some to speculate that David did indeed want him.

His nephew, Nathan Garrick, married Martha Leigh, daughter of Sir Egerton Leigh, and sister of Sir Samuel Egerton Leigh, author of Munster Abbey; a Romance: Interspersed with Reflections on Virtue and Morality (Edinburgh 1797).

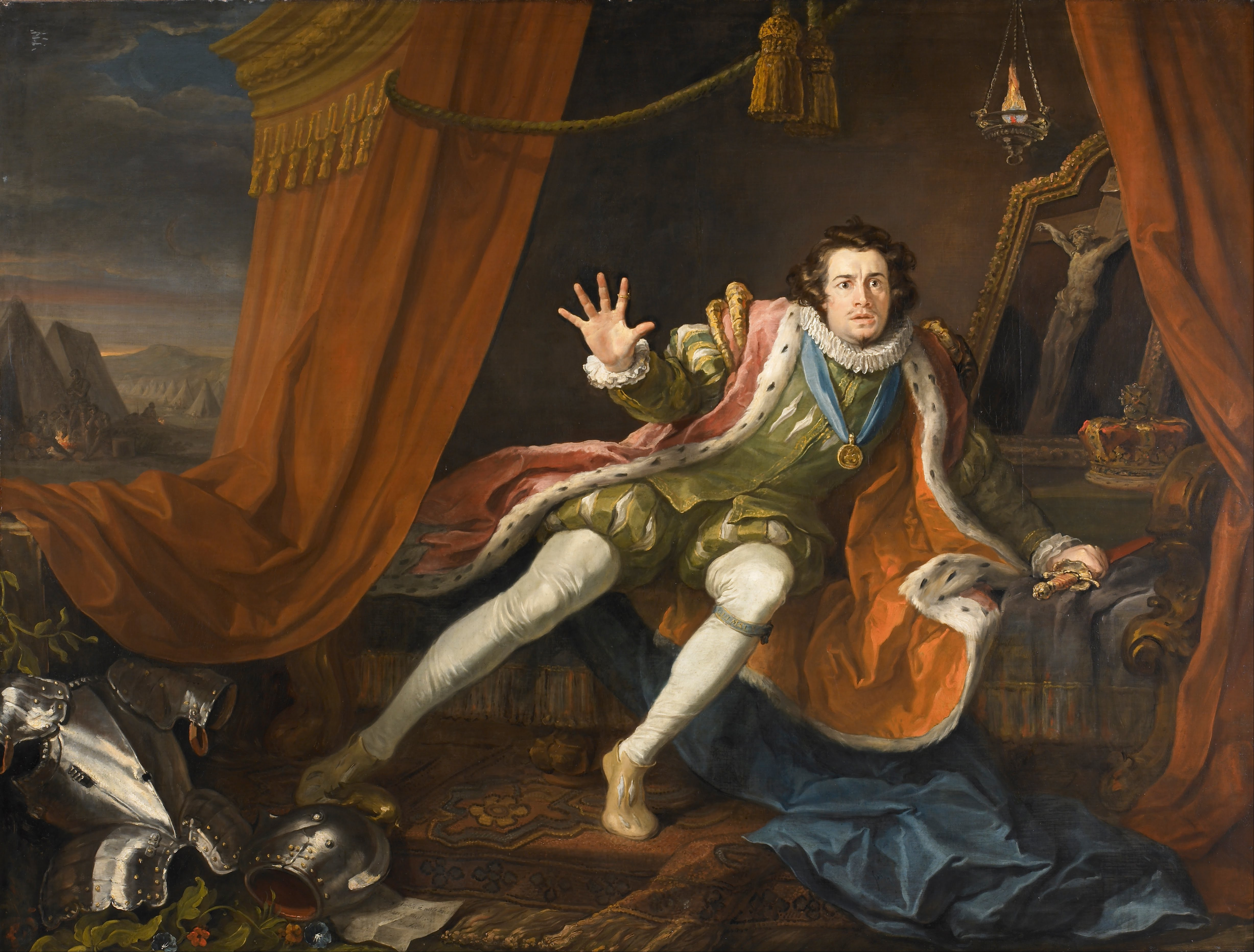
Have mercy, Jesu! Soft! I did but dream. O coward conscience, how dost thou afflict me! – Shakespeare's Richard III Act V, Sc. 3. David Garrick in 1745 as Richard III just before the battle of Bosworth Field, his sleep having been haunted by the ghosts of those he has murdered, wakes to the realisation that he is alone in the world and death is imminent. Painting by the English painter William Hogarth (which is on display at the Walker Art Gallery, Liverpool).

At the age of 19, Garrick, who had been educated at Lichfield Grammar School, enrolled in Samuel Johnson's Edial Hall School. Garrick showed an enthusiasm for the theatre very early on and he appeared in a school production around this time in the role of Sergeant Kite in George Farquhar's The Recruiting Officer. After Johnson's school was closed, he and Garrick, now friends, travelled to London together to seek their fortunes. Upon his arrival in 1737, Garrick and his brother became partners in a wine business with operations in London and Lichfield, with David taking the London operation.

The business did not flourish, possibly due to Garrick's distraction by amateur theatricals. Playwright Samuel Foote remarked that he had known Garrick to have only three quarts of vinegar in his cellar and still called himself a wine merchant. He was supposedly a pupil at Sir Joseph Williamson's Mathematical School.

In 1740, four years after Garrick arrived in London, and with his wine business failing, he saw his first play, a satire, Lethe: or Aesop in the Shade, produced at the Theatre Royal, Drury Lane. Within a year he was appearing professionally, playing small parts at the Goodman's Fields Theatre under the management of Henry Giffard. The Goodman's Fields Theatre had been closed by the Licensing Act 1737, which closed all theatres that did not hold the letters patent and required all plays to be approved by the Lord Chamberlain before the performance. Garrick's performances at the theatre were a result of Giffard's help with Garrick's wine business. Giffard had helped Garrick win the business of the Bedford Coffee-house, an establishment patronised by many theatrical and literary people and a location Garrick frequented.

== Professional actor ==
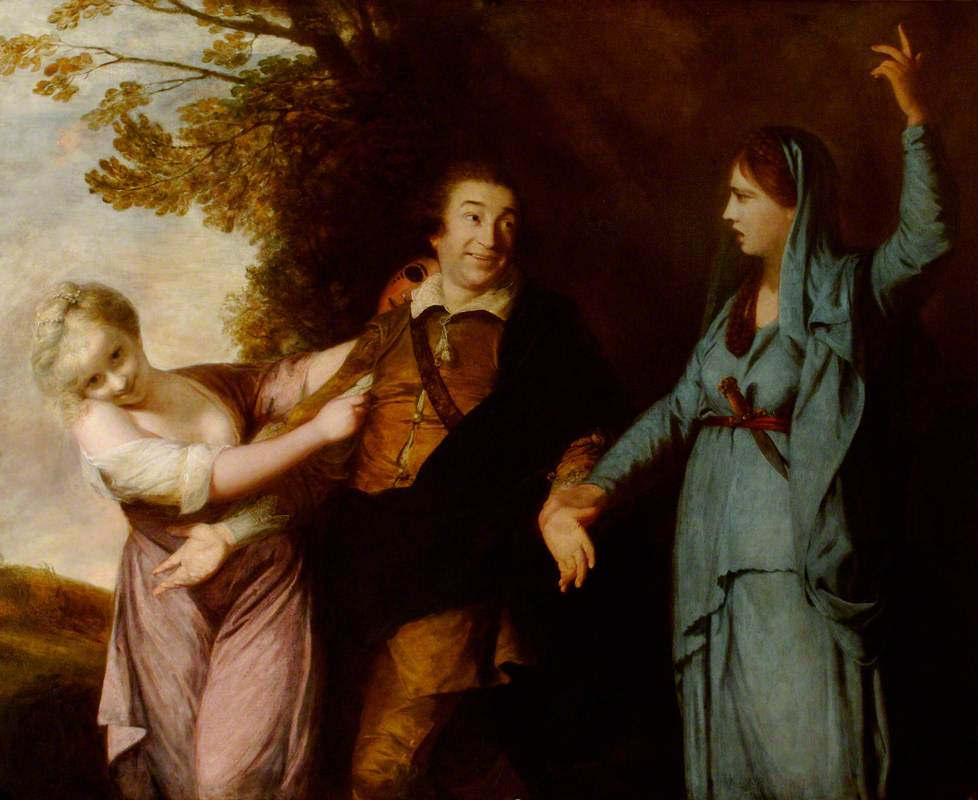
Joshua Reynolds, David Garrick Between Tragedy and Comedy, 1760–61 at Waddesdon Manor

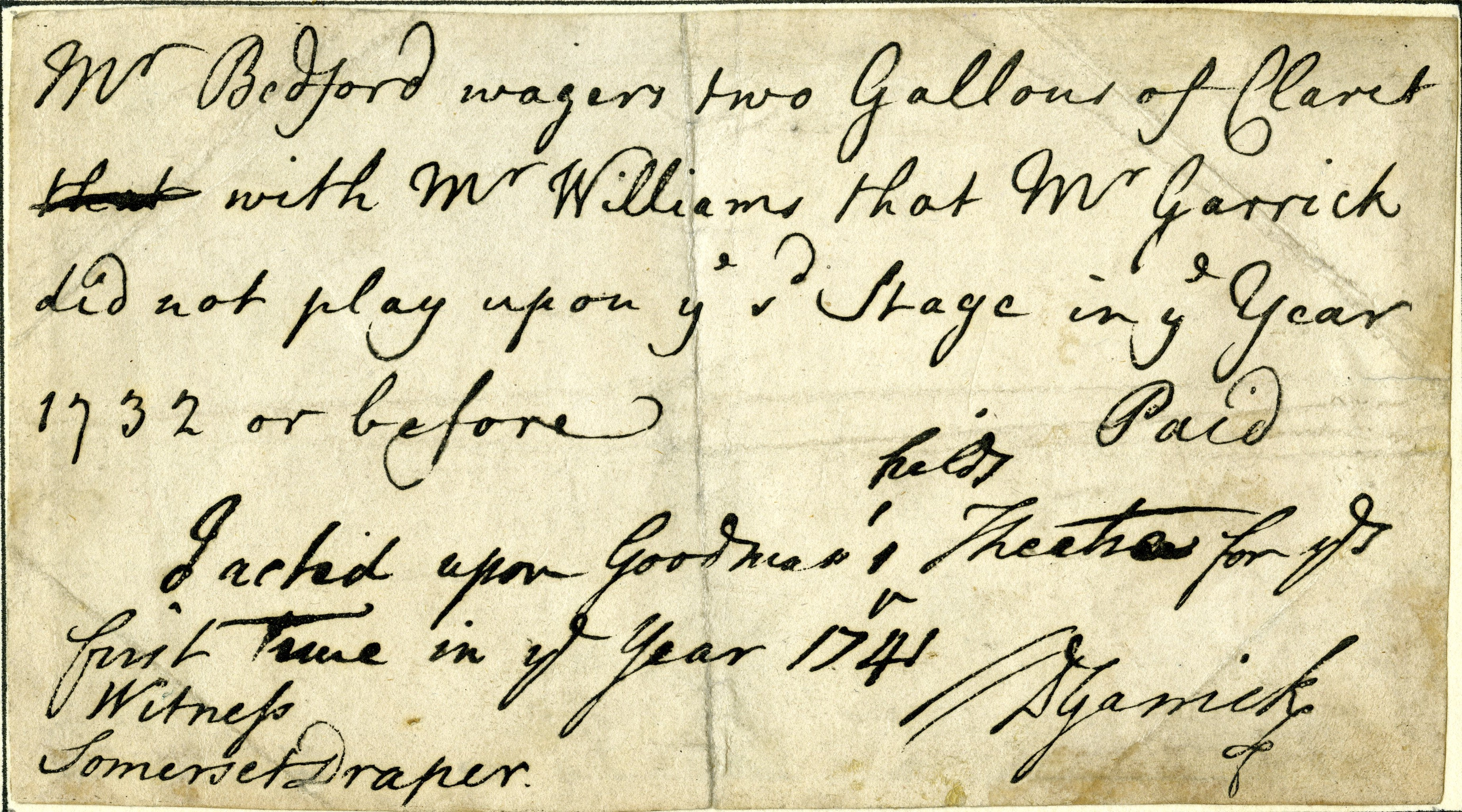
Wager between Mr Bedford and Mr Williams (for two gallons of claret) that Mr Garrick did not act upon the stage before 1732, countersigned by David Garrick that he first acted at Goodman’s Fields Theatre in the year 1741; image from University of Bristol Theatre Collection.

He made his debut as a professional actor on a summer tour to Ipswich with Giffard's troupe in 1741, where he played Aboan in Oroonoko at the theatre in Tankard Street. He appeared under the stage name Lyddal to avoid the consternation of his family. But, while he was successful under Giffard, the managers of Drury Lane and Covent Garden rejected him. On 19 October 1741, Garrick appeared in the title role of Richard III. He had been coached in the role by the actor and playwright Charles Macklin and his natural performance, which rejected the declamatory acting style so prevalent in the period, soon was the talk of London. Of his performance at Goodman's Fields, Horace Walpole remarked, "there was a dozen dukes a night at Goodman's Fields". Following his rousing performance, Garrick wrote to his brother requesting withdrawal from the partnership to devote his time completely to the stage. Having found success with Richard III, Garrick moved on to several other roles including Tate's adaptation of Shakespeare's King Lear and Pierre in Otway's Venice Preserv'd as well as comic roles such as Bayes in Buckingham's The Rehearsal; a total of 18 roles in all in just the first six months of his acting career. His success led Alexander Pope, who saw him perform three times during this period, to surmise, "that young man never had his equal as an actor, and he will never have a rival".

With his success at Goodman's Fields, Charles Fleetwood, manager of Drury Lane, engaged Garrick to play Chaumont in Otway's The Orphan (a role he first played in Ipswich) on 11 May 1742 while he used his letters patent to close down Giffard's theatre. That same month, Garrick played King Lear opposite Margaret "Peg" Woffington as Cordelia and his popular Richard III. With these successes, Fleetwood engaged Garrick for the full 1742–43 season.

== Drury Lane ==
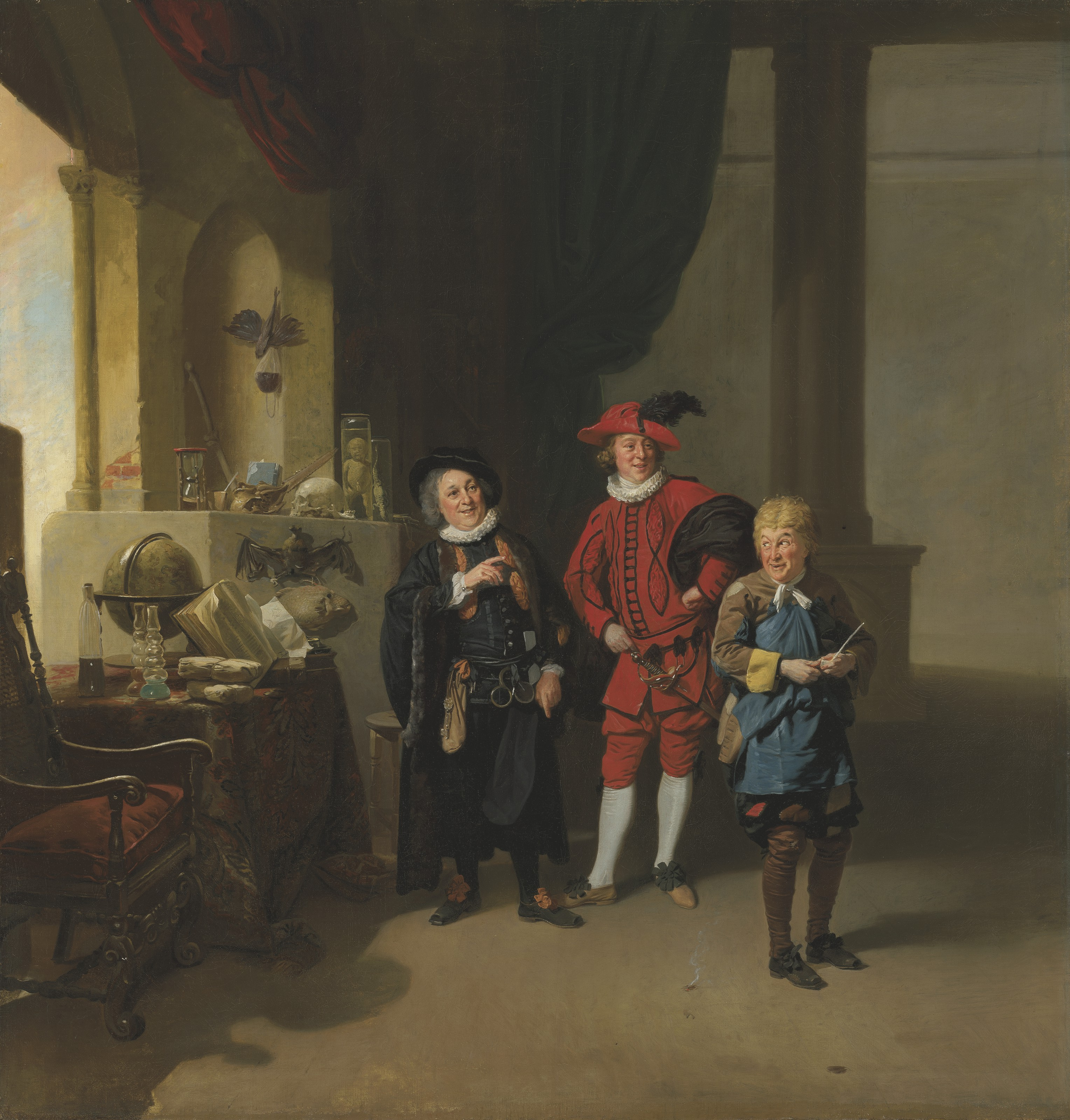
Garrick (right) as Abel Drugger in Jonson's The Alchemist painted by Johann Zoffany

At the end of the London season, Garrick, along with Peg Woffington, travelled to Dublin for the summer season at the Theatre Royal, Smock Alley. While in Dublin, Garrick added three new roles to his repertoire: Shakespeare's Hamlet, Abel Drugger in Ben Jonson's The Alchemist (a role that earned him much acclaim) and Captain Plume in Farquhar's The Recruiting Officer. Some of his success could be attributed to one of his earliest fans, John Boyle, 5th Earl of Cork, who wrote letters to many noblemen and gentlemen recommending Garrick's acting. His writings led Garrick to exclaim that it must have been the reason he was "more caressed" in Dublin.

Five years after joining the acting company at Drury Lane, Garrick again travelled to Dublin for a season where he managed and directed at the Smock Alley Theatre in conjunction with Thomas Sheridan, the father of Richard Brinsley Sheridan. After his return to London, he spent some time acting at Covent Garden under John Rich while a farce of his, Miss in Her Teens, was also produced there.

With the end of the 1746–1747 season, Fleetwoods' patent on Drury Lane expired. In partnership with James Lacy, Garrick took over the theatre in April 1747. The theatre had been in decline for some years, but the partnership of Garrick and Lacy led to success and accolades. The first performance under Garrick and Lacy's management opened with an Ode to Drury Lane Theatre, on dedicating a Building and erecting a Statue, to Shakespeare read by Garrick and written by his friend Dr Johnson. The ode promised the patrons that "The drama's law the drama's patrons give,/For we that live to please must please to live." Certainly, this statement could be regarded as succinctly summing up Garrick's management at Drury Lane where he was able to balance both artistic integrity and the fickle tastes of the public.

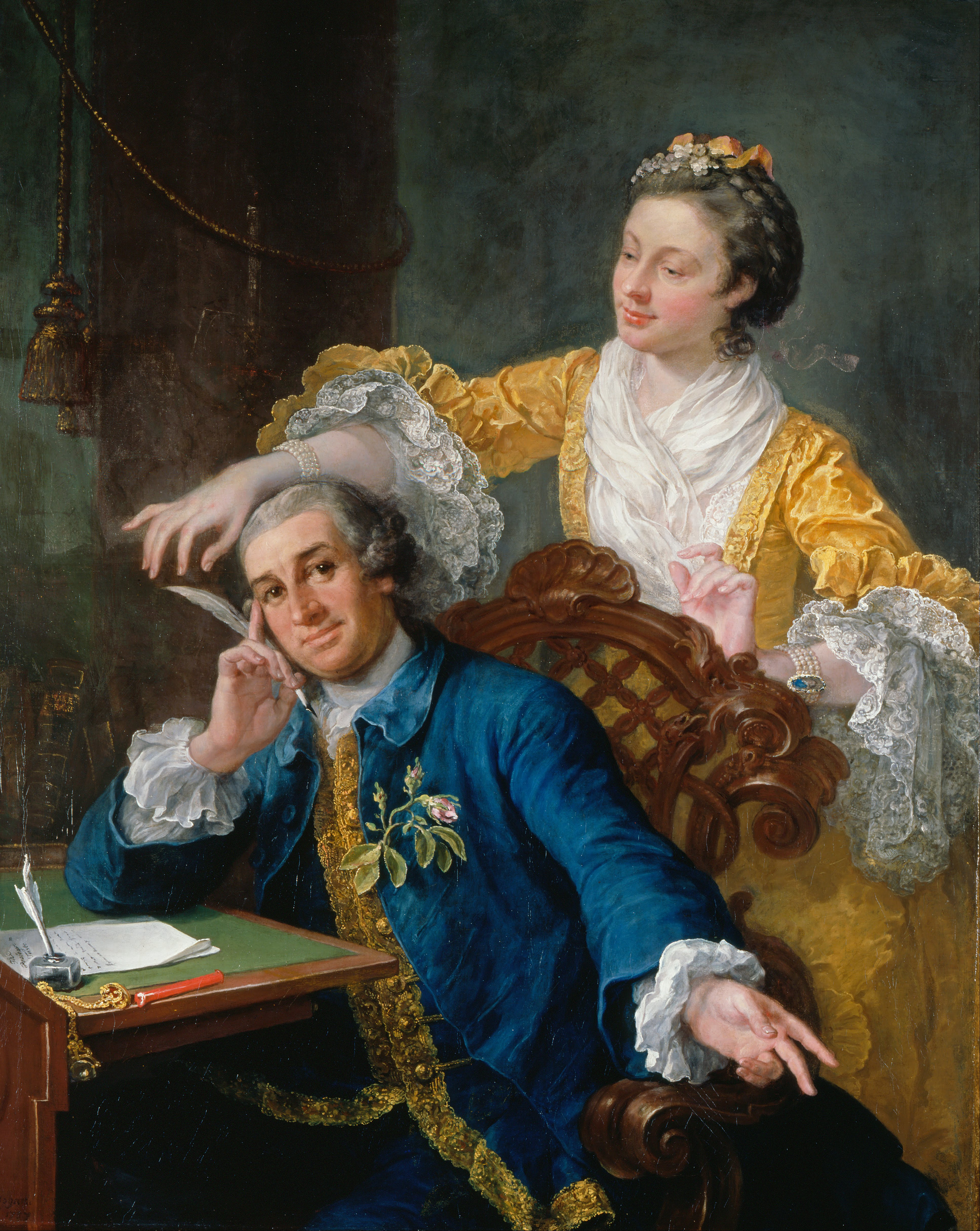
Garrick and his wife, Eva Marie Veigel, painted by William Hogarth

After the Woffington affair, there were several botched love affairs, including possibly fathering a son with Jane Green. Garrick met Eva Marie Veigel, a German dancer in opera choruses who emigrated to London in 1746. The pair wed on 22 June 1749 and were depicted together in several portraits, including one by William Hogarth, who also made several drawings and paintings of them separately. The union was childless but happy, Garrick calling her "the best of women and wives", and they were famously inseparable throughout their nearly 30 years of marriage. Garrick's increasing wealth enabled him to purchase a palatial estate for Eva Marie and himself to live in, naming it Garrick's Villa, that he bought at Hampton in 1754. He also indulged his passion for Shakespeare by building a Temple to Shakespeare on the riverside at Hampton to house his collection of memorabilia. Hogarth collaborated with Garrick on the furnishing of this temple, and their relationship to, and self-identification with, Shakespeare has been extensively examined by Robin Simon.

In September 1769 Garrick staged the Shakespeare Jubilee in Stratford-upon-Avon. It was a major focal point in the emerging movement that helped cement Shakespeare as England's national poet. It involved a number of events held in the town to celebrate (five years too late) 200 years since Shakespeare's birth. In a speech made on the second day of the Jubilee in Stratford Garrick recognised the Shakespeare Ladies Club as those who "restor'd Shakespeare to the Stage," protecting his fame and erecting "a Monument to his and your own honour in Westminster Abbey."

No Shakespeare plays were performed during the Jubilee, and heavy rain forced a Shakespeare Pageant to be called off. The Pageant was first staged a month later at Drury Lane Theatre under the title The Jubilee and proved successful, with 90 performances. The song "Soft Flowing Avon" was composed by Thomas Arne, with lyrics by Garrick, for the Jubilee.

Garrick managed the Theatre Royal, Drury Lane, until he retired from management in 1776. In his last years he continued to add roles to his repertoire; Posthumus in Cymbeline was among his last famous roles.

== Death ==
Shortly before his death he worked on the production of The Camp with Sheridan at Drury Lane and caught a very bad cold. The Camp satirised the British response to a threatened 18th-century invasion by France, leading some to jokingly claim that Garrick was the only casualty of the ultimately abandoned invasion.

He died less than three years after his retirement, at his house in Adelphi Buildings, London, and was interred in Poets' Corner in Westminster Abbey. Mrs. Garrick survived her husband by 43 years, living to the age of 98; she never married again.

== Family ==
His great-grand-niece was the soprano Malvina Garrigues and her first cousin, the Danish-American doctor Henry Jacques Garrigues.

== Legacy ==
=== An easy, natural manner ===
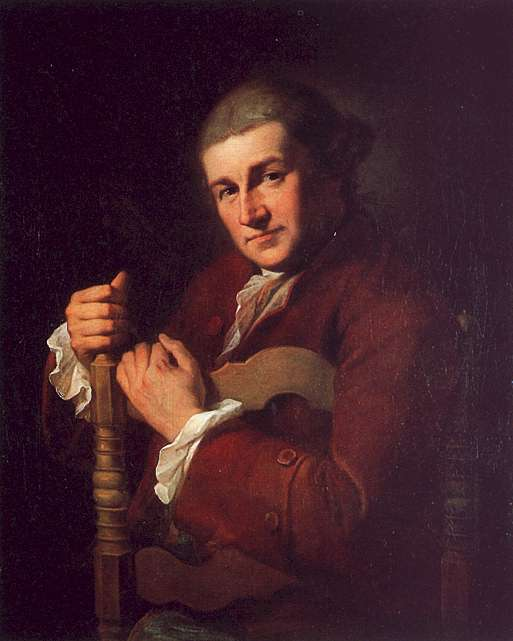
Portrait of David Garrick by Angelica Kauffman, 1764

Perhaps it was Garrick's acting, the most showy of his careers, that brought him the most adulation. Garrick was not a large man, only standing 5'4", and his voice is not described as particularly loud. From his first performance, Garrick departed from the bombastic style that had been popular, choosing instead a more relaxed, naturalistic style that his biographer Alan Kendall states "would probably seem quite normal to us today, but it was new and strange for his day." Certainly, this new style brought acclaim: Alexander Pope stated, "he was afraid the young man would be spoiled, for he would have no competitor." Garrick quotes George Lyttelton as complimenting him by saying, "He told me he never knew what acting was till I appeared." Even James Quin, an actor in the old style remarked, "If this young fellow be right, then we have been all wrong."

While Garrick's praises were being sung by many, there were some detractors. Theophilus Cibber in his Two Dissertations on the Theatres of 1756 believed that Garrick's realistic style went too far:

his over-fondness for extravagant Attitudes, frequently affected Starts, convulsive Twitchings, Jerkings of the Body, Sprawling of the Fingers, slapping the Breast and Pockets:-A Set of mechanical Motions in constant Use-the Caricatures of gesture suggested by pert vivacity,-his pantomimical Manner of acting every Word in a Sentence, his Unnatural Pauses in the middle of a sentence; his forc'd Conceits; -his wilful Neglect of Harmony, even where the round Period of a well express'd Noble Sentiment demands a graceful Cadence in the delivery.

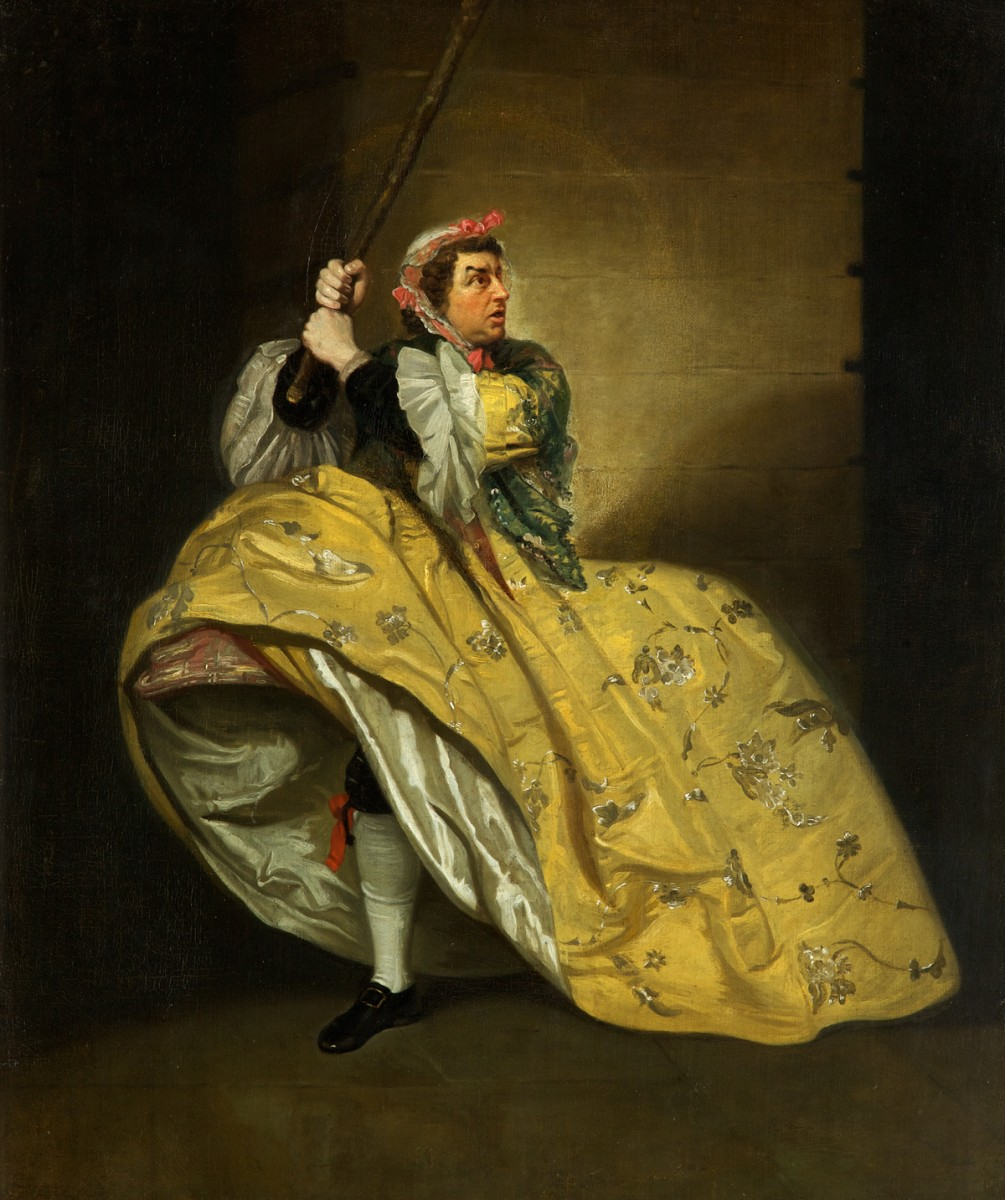
David Garrick in The Provoked Wife by Johann Zoffany, 1763

But Garrick's legacy was perhaps best summarised by the historian Rev Nicolas Tindal when he said that:

The deaf hear him in his action, and the blind see him in his voice.

=== Memorials ===
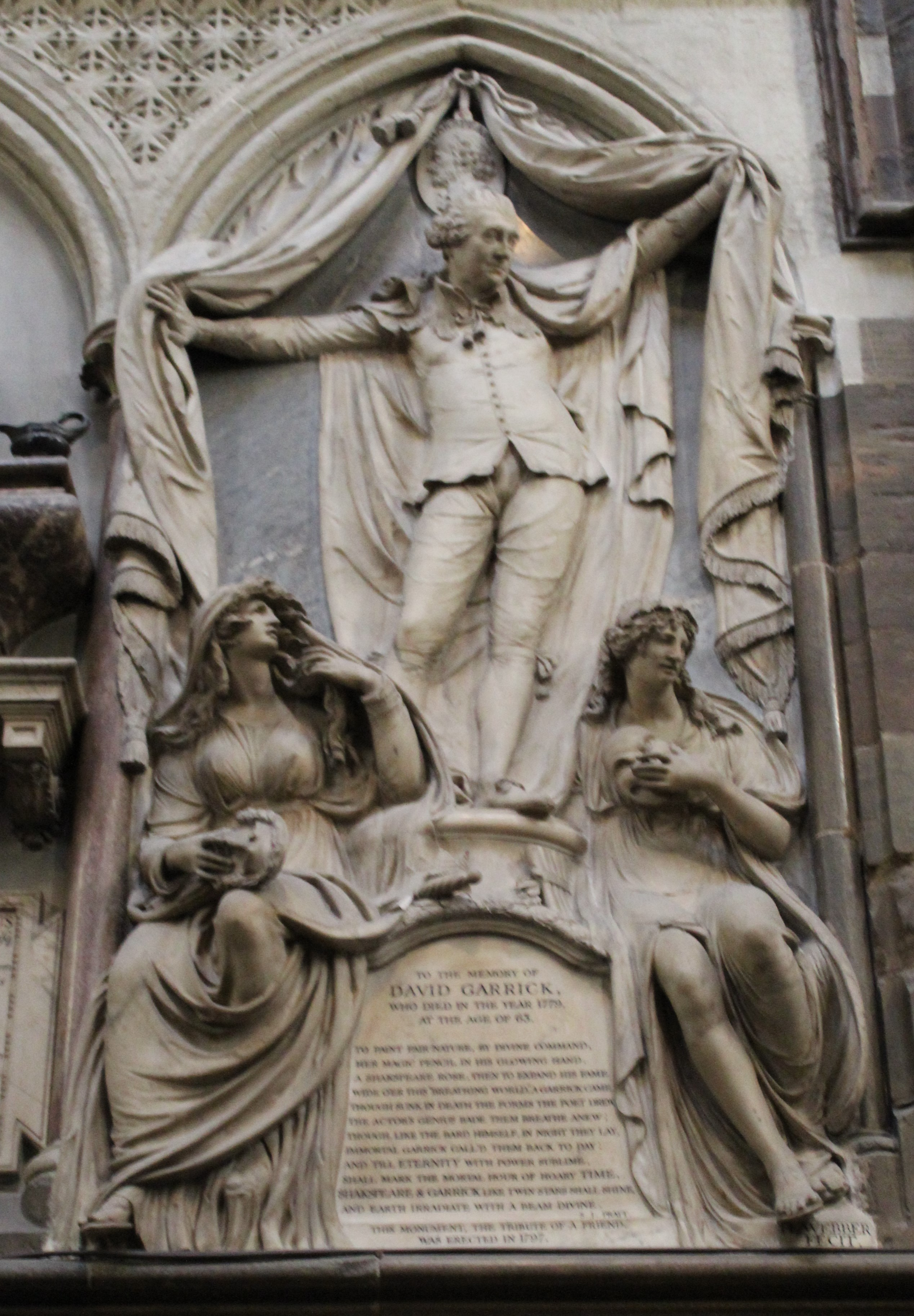
Memorial to Garrick in Westminster Abbey

- A two-volume biography, Memoirs of the life of David Garrick, Esq. : interspersed with characters and anecdotes of his theatrical contemporaries : the whole forming a history of the stage, which includes a period of thirty-six years, was written by Thomas Davies (c. 1712–1785)
- The Garrick Club in London, named in his honour.
- Garrick's Temple to Shakespeare, built on Garrick's Lawn in the riverside gardens of his Villa near Hampton Court, now restored as a memorial to David Garrick and his life in Hampton, London.
- A monument to Garrick in Lichfield Cathedral bears Johnson's famous comment:

I am disappointed by that stroke of death that has eclipsed the gaiety of nations, and impoverished the public stock of harmless pleasure.

- A carved stone medallion showing Garrick, a metre or more in diameter, is on display at Birmingham Central Library.

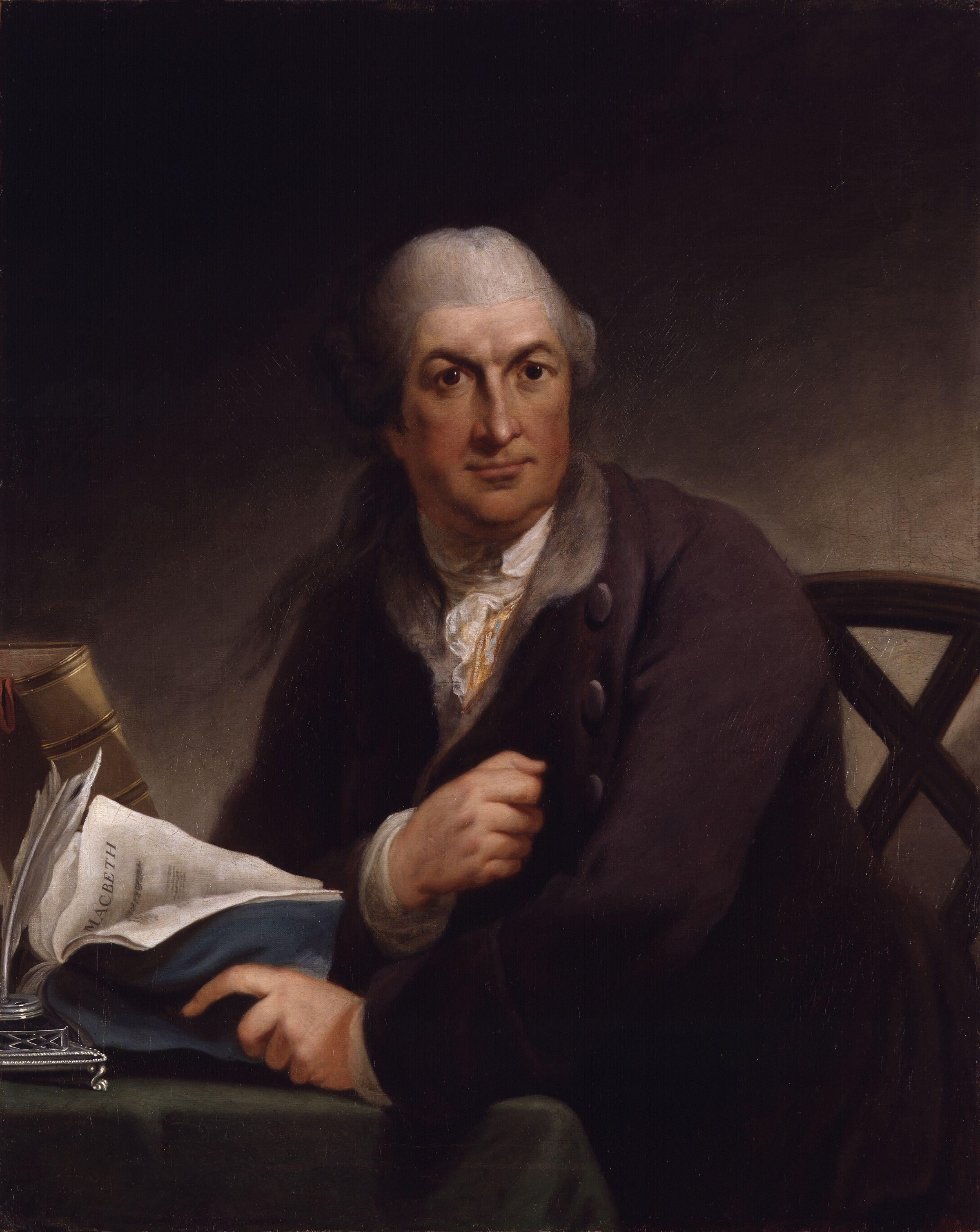
c. 1775 portrait of Garrick by Robert Edge Pine

- Garrick was the first actor to be granted the honour of being buried in Westminster Abbey, in Poets' Corner, in the ground in front of the monument to William Shakespeare. Later Henry Irving, the first actor to be knighted, was buried beside Garrick on the same spot. In 1989, Laurence Olivier was the third to be given that honour.
- In 1797, a sculptural memorial by Henry Webber to Garrick was installed on the west wall of Poet’s Corner; it features the following poem by Samuel Jackson Pratt:

To paint fair Nature, by divine command,
Her magic pencil in his glowing hand,
A Shakespeare rose: then, to expand his fame
Wide o’er this breathing world, a Garrick came.
Though sunk in death the forms the Poet drew,
The Actor’s genius made them breathe anew;
Though, like the bard himself, in night they lay,
Immortal Garrick call’d them back to day:
And till Eternity with power sublime
Shall mark the mortal hour of hoary Time,
Shakespeare and Garrick like twin-stars shall shine,
And earth irradiate with a beam divine.

— Text of plaque on site of Garrick Theatre, Hereford

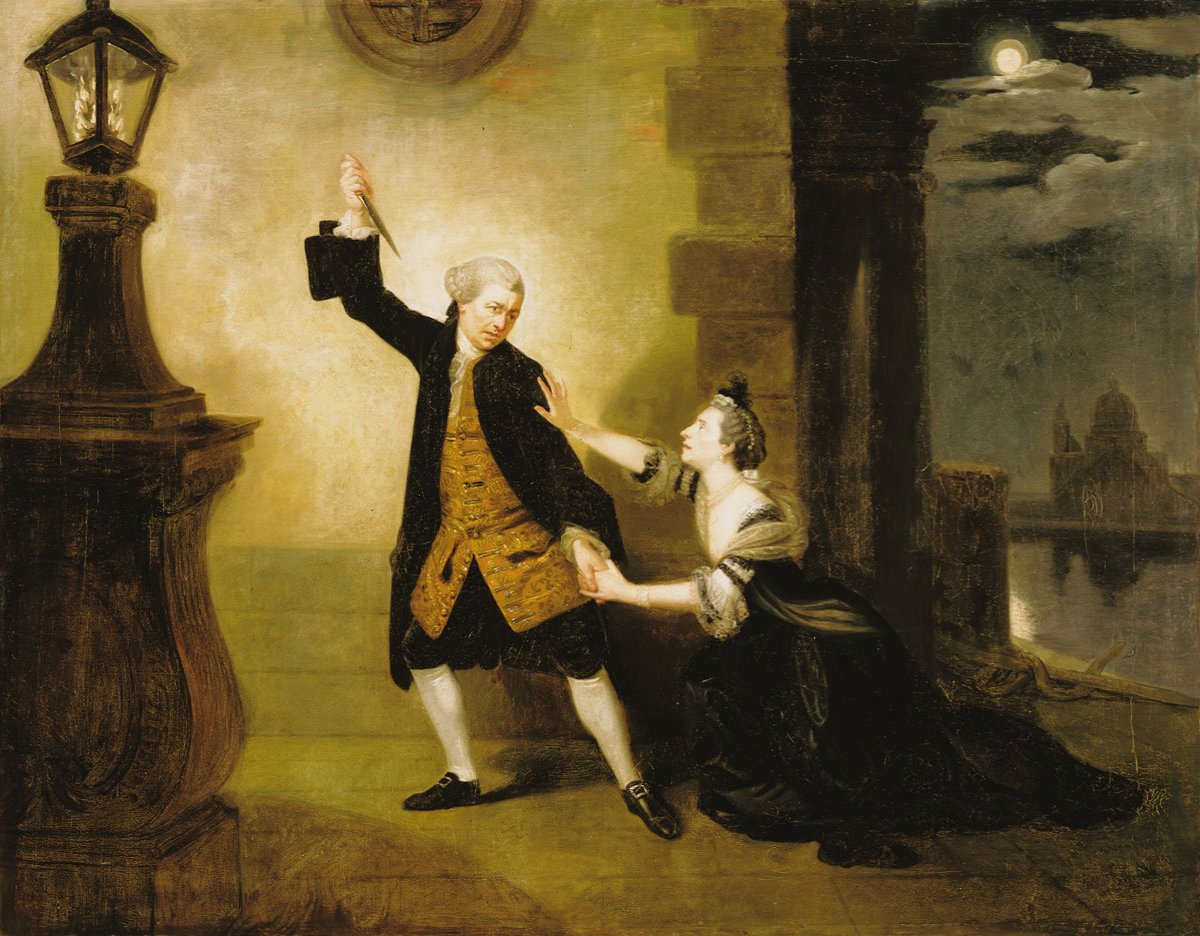
Venice Preserv'd by Johan Zoffany, 1763. Garrick in the role of Jaffier alongside Susannah Maria Cibber

- In 1811, the poet and essayist Charles Lamb published "On Garrick, and Acting"—better known as "On the Tragedies of Shakespeare: Considered with Reference to Their Fitness for Stage Representation" (1818)—in response to his encounter with the Westminster Abbey Garrick memorial and inscription.
- The Mexican author Juan de Dios Peza wrote Reír llorando ("To laugh crying"), a poem in which the actor "Garrik" [sic] is presented as a sad clown.
- Cedric Hardwicke portrayed Garrick in the 1935 British film Peg of Old Drury.
- A 1937 film called The Great Garrick, directed by James Whale, is a fictional story of how Garrick's acting skills and ego inspire the actors of the Comédie-Française to try and teach him a lesson. Brian Aherne stars as Garrick.
- In 1969, Ian McShane played Garrick in an episode of the British television series Rogues' Gallery.
- He appears as a character in the plays David Garrick (1864) and Mr Foote's Other Leg (2015).
- A School House at King Edward VI School, Lichfield, is named after him.
- The lyrics he penned for "Heart of Oak" remain, with William Boyce's music, the official March of the Royal Navy.
- Legend has it that he was so engrossed in a performance of Richard III that he was oblivious to a bone fracture, inspiring the theatrical felicitation "Break a leg!".
- There was a pub in Milton Keynes named after him in the Theatre District, open from 2000 and closed in 2016.
- The Garrick Inn, reputedly Stratford-upon-Avon's oldest pub, is named after him.
- The Garrick Bar, a Belfast pub named after him since 1870.
- The Garrick's Head, an Urmston, Manchester pub named after him since 1830.
- Garrick's Head pub in Bath, behind the Georgian Theatre Royal, Bath is named after him.
- Five early Lodges of the Royal Antediluvian Order of Buffaloes were named after Garrick.
- In 2007, the Spanish theatre troupe Tricicle presented the comedy "Garrick".
- David Garrick appears as an important character in the graphic novel La pièce manquante ("The Missing Play", 2023) by Jean Harambat. The novel stars actress Peg Woffington on a quest to find William Shakespeare's missing play The History of Cardenio, with Garrick being her insistent suitor and sometime opponent, trying to get his hands on the text before she does - but, as revealed at the end, only so that he can gift it to her in an attempt to woo her.

=== Theatre names ===
Several theatres have been named after Garrick:

- Two theatres, in London, have been named for him. The first, Garrick Theatre (Leman St) in Whitechapel opened in 1831, and closed in 1881. The second, opened in 1889 as the Garrick Theatre, still survives.
- The Lichfield Garrick Theatre takes its name from David Garrick, as does the Garrick Room, the main function suite in Lichfield's George Hotel.
- Two amateur dramatic theatres in Greater Manchester, the Altrincham Garrick Theatre and the Stockport Garrick Theatre (1901), also take his name.
- The arts and theatre building at Hampton School is named after him.
- A Community Theatre located in Guildford (north of Perth) in Western Australia, is named after Garrick. Established in 1932, the Garrick Theatre Club is the longest continually running amateur theatre in metropolitan Perth.
- A Community Theatre located in Bonavista, Newfoundland, Canada, is named after Garrick.
- The Garrick Theatre in Hereford (David Garrick's birthplace) was built in 1882 and took its name in 1909, before becoming a fulltime cinema in 1929, and unfortunately being demolished in 1978.
- The Courtyard Theatre, in Hereford (David Garrick's birthplace) has a room titled "Garrick Room" after David Garrick.

== Major works ==
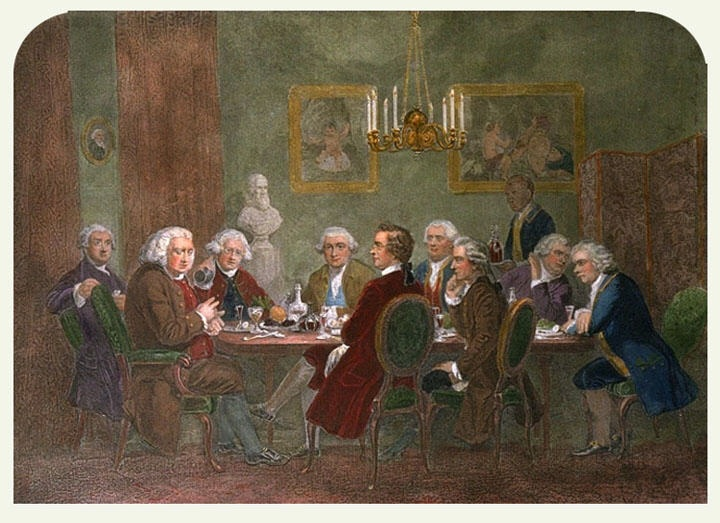
A literary party at Sir Joshua Reynolds's. Left to right: James Boswell, Samuel Johnson, Joshua Reynolds, David Garrick, Edmund Burke, Pasquale Paoli, Charles Burney, a servant (possibly Francis Barber), Thomas Warton, Oliver Goldsmith. (select a detail of the image for more information)

- Lethe: or, Aesop in the Shades (1740)
- The Lying Valet (1741)
- Miss in Her Teens; or, The Medley of Lovers (1747)
- Lilliput (1756)
- The Male Coquette; or, Seventeen Fifty Seven (1757)
- The Guardian (1759)
- Harlequin's Invasion (1759)
- The Enchanter; or, Love and Magic (1760)
- The Farmer's Return from London (1762)
- The Clandestine Marriage (1766)
- The Country Girl (1766)
- Neck or Nothing (1766)
- Cymon (1767)
- Linco's Travels (1767)
- A Peep Behind the Curtain, or The New Rehearsal (1767)
- The Jubilee (1769)
- The Irish Widow (1772)
- A Christmas Tale (1773)
- The Meeting of the Company; or, Bayes's Art of Acting (1774)
- Bon Ton; or, High Life Above Stairs (1775)
- The Theatrical Candidates (1775)
- May-Day; or, The Little Gypsy (1775)

== Bibliography ==
- Batty, Mark (2004), "Hippisley, John (1696–1748)", Oxford Dictionary of National Biography (online ed.), Oxford University Press, doi:10.1093/ref:odnb/13359 (Subscription, Wikipedia Library access or UK public library membership required.)
- Bellot, H. Hale (1956). "Presidential Address: The Leighs in South Carolina". Transactions of the Royal Historical Society. 6. Royal Historical Society: 161–187. doi:10.2307/3678845. eISSN 1474-0648. ISSN 0080-4401. JSTOR 3678845. S2CID 159699219.
- BSO staff (1909), Boston Symphony Orchestra Program also published in the Boston Music Hall Bulletin, p. 554
- Carruthers, Robert; Ward, Adolphus William (1911), "Garrick, David" , in Chisholm, Hugh (ed.), Encyclopædia Britannica, vol. 11 (11th ed.), Cambridge University Press, pp. 475–477
- Ennis, Daniel J.; Slagle, Judith Bailey (2007), Prologues, Epilogues, Curtain-Raisers and Afterpieces, Rosemont Publishing
- Greenway, Diana E., ed. (1999), "List 30: Prebendaries, Husthwaite", Fasti Ecclesiae Anglicanae 1066–1300: Volume 6, York, London: Institute of Historical Research, pp. 81–82
- Freedley, George and Reeves, John A. (1968). A History of the Theatre. New York, Crown.
- Hartnoll, Phyllis (1983), The Oxford Companion to the Theatre, Oxford University Press
- Holland, Peter (1995), Banham, Martin (ed.), "David Garrick", The Cambridge Guide to Theatre, London: Cambridge University Press: 411–412
- Keever, Tom Dale (18 December 1995), "Richard III as rewritten by Colley Cibber", Primary Texts and Secondary Sources On-line, Richard III Society – American Branch, archived from the original on 17 March 2013
- Kendall, Alan (1985), David Garrick: A Biography, London: Harrap, ISBN 978-0-245-54252-7
- Nichols, John; Bentley, Samuel (1812), Literary Anecdotes of the Eighteenth Century: Comprizing Biographical Memoirs of William Bowyer, Printer, F.S.A., and Many of His Learned Friends; an Incidental View of the Progress and Advancement of Literature in this Kingdom During the Last Century; and Biographical Anecdotes of a Considerable Number of Eminent Writers and Ingenious Artists; with a Very Copious Index, Printed for the author, by Nichols, son, and Bentley, p. 515
- Pierce, Patricia (2005), The Great Shakespeare Fraud: The Strange, True Story of William Henry-Ireland, Sutton Publishing
- Richmond Library staff (2011), Local History Notes – Garrick's Villa and Temple to Shakespeare (PDF), Richmond Libraries
- Sechelski, Denise S. (1996). "Garrick's Body and the Labor of Art in Eighteenth-Century Theater". Eighteenth-Century Studies. 29 (4). American Society for Eighteenth-Century Studies: 369–389. doi:10.1353/ecs.1996.0028. eISSN 1086-315X. ISSN 0013-2586. JSTOR 30053837. S2CID 162269723.
- Robinson, Terry F. (2023). "The David Garrick Monument, Westminster Abbey". RĚVE: The Virtual Exhibition. European Romanticisms in Association.
- Sheaf, John; Howe, Ken (1995), Hampton and Teddington Past, Historical Publications, p. 55, ISBN 0-948667-25-7
- Simon, Robin Shakespeare, Hogarth and Garrick: Plays, Painting and Performance (London, 2023)
- Stochholm, Johanne (1964), Garrick's Folly: The Shakespeare Jubilee of 1769 at Stratford and Drury Lane, New York: Barnes & Noble Inc.
- Woods, Leigh (1996), Pickering, David (ed.), "David Garrick", International Dictionary of Theatre, 3, New York: St. James Press
