= Anthony Rose (wine) =

British wine journalist

Anthony Rose is a British wine journalist known for his column in The Independent, which ran for the length of the print version from 1986 to 2016. He also contributes to publications such as Decanter, The Real Review , The Financial Times How to Spend It online and The Oxford Companion to Wine . Rose has contributed to several wine books including Wine Report, The Oxford Companion to Wine, and for five years co-authored the annual consumer guide Grapevine with Tim Atkin. Rose was one of four UK wine writers, along with Joanna Simon, David Williams and Jane Parkinson, to launch an online wine ratings magazine for the UK called The Wine Gang. He is the panel chair for Southern Italy at the Decanter World Wine Awards.

== Accomplishments ==
Among the awards Rose has received are the Prix de Lanson Black Label Award 2000, the Prix de Lanson Champagne Writer of the Year 2002 and the Glenfiddich Wine Writer of the Year Award 2005. In September 2008 he won the inaugural International Wine Columnist of the Year Award, at the Louis Roederer awards, for his columns in The Independent. Judge chairman Steven Spurrier explained the reasoning behind the selection as, "Most wine columns in the national press aren't really columns but lists of recommendations. We wanted to reward writers who get across some personality and colour in their column."

In February 2013 Rose was awarded the prize for top wine taster at the Oxford-v-Cambridge 60th anniversary blind wine tasting competition run by Pol Roger Champagne.

Rose also functions as a worldwide wine tasting judge, has resided as a judge in the Cambridge Noses vs. Oxford Palates contest alongside Jancis Robinson and Hugh Johnson. and taught the Leiths School of Food & Wine Certificate course in schools.

Rose has also been co-chairman of the International Sake Challenge held each year in Tokyo. In his capacity as a sake professional, he taught sake to restaurant staff and co-created a sake course for consumers which he ran jointly with Christine Parkinson of the Hakkasan Group at Sake No Hana in St.James's Street, London.

In 2018, Rose published Sake and the Wines of Japan (Infinite Ideas), which was one of three books nominated for Drink Book of the Year at the 2019 Fortnum & Mason Food & Drink Awards. His book Fizz! Champagne and Sparkling Wines of the World in the same series was published in November 2021 and nominated in the Drinks Book category in the Guild of Food Writers Annual Awards 2022.

He has his own website and blog at www.anthonyrosewine.com

== See also ==
- List of wine personalities
