= Garrick Theatre (disambiguation) =

Garrick Theatre is a West End theatre built 1889 commissioned by W. S. Gilbert.

Garrick Theatre may also refer to:

- Altrincham Garrick Playhouse
- Garrick Cinema, a movie house in New York City
- Garrick Theater (Chicago) (1891–1961), built by Louis Sullivan
- Garrick Theatre (Guildford), an amateur theatre in Western Australia
- Garrick Theatre (Leman St) (1831–1881), a London theatre in Whitechapel
- Garrick Theatre (Los Angeles), a former 900-seat movie house in Los Angeles
- Garrick Theatre (Melbourne) (1912–1937), a former theatre in Melbourne, Australia
- Garrick Theatre (New York City) (1890–1932), 910-seat theatre
- Garrick Theatre (Philadelphia) (1901–1936), 1,561-seat theatre designed by Willis G. Hale
- Garrick Theatre, Southport (built 1932), a former theatre, cinema and bingo hall in Southport, Merseyside
- Garrick Theatre, Stockport (founded 1901), oldest "little theatre" in the U.K.
- Garrick Theatre, Sydney (1890-1920), renamed the Tivoli Theatre in 1893
- Lichfield Garrick Theatre (built 2003), a theatre in Lichfield, Staffordshire
