= The Master of Man =

1921 novel by Hall Caine

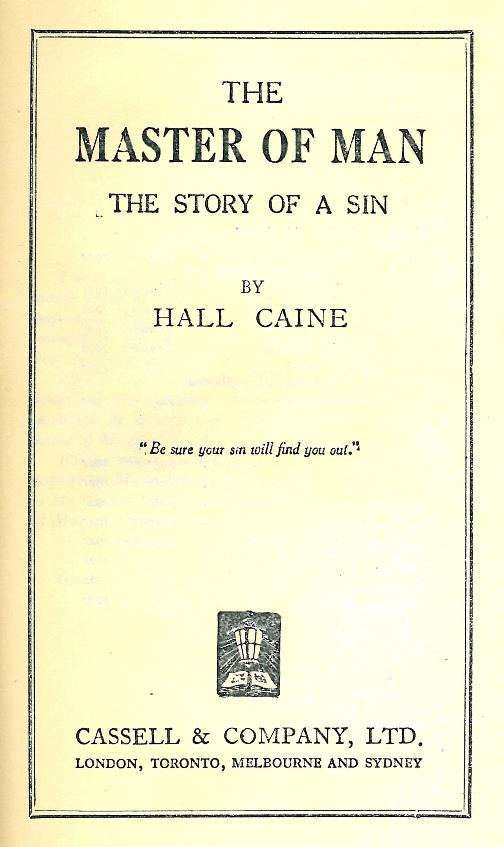
- The title page of the 1924 Cassell & Co. reprint
- Author: Hall Caine
- Language: English
- Published: 1921 (Heinemann)
- Publication place: UK
- Media type: Print (hardcover)
- Pages: 432 pp

The Master of Man: The Story of a Sin was a best-selling 1921 novel by Hall Caine. The fictional story is set on the Isle of Man and is concerned with Victor Stowell, the Deemster's son, who commits a romantic indiscretion and then gives up on all of his principles in order to keep it a secret. However, in the face of the mounting consequences, Victor confesses publicly to his crime and is punished, but redemption comes through a woman's love. The penultimate of Caine's novels, it is romantic and moralistic, returning to his regular themes of sin, justice and atonement, whilst also addressing "the woman question." It was adapted for a film entitled Name the Man in 1924 by Victor Sjöström.

== Genesis ==
The central idea for the plot of The Master of Man came from a correspondence which Hall Caine had in September 1908. Following a performance of the theatrical version of his earlier novel, The Christian, Caine was identified as a likely signatory in a petition against the harsh punishment of a woman named Daisy Lord. After giving birth to a child out of wedlock the young woman had killed the child secretly but was discovered and arrested. At the trial she explained that "I thought I would put an end to it so that it should not have the trouble I have had." Caine signed the petition but he kept the accompanying letter as a record of its story.

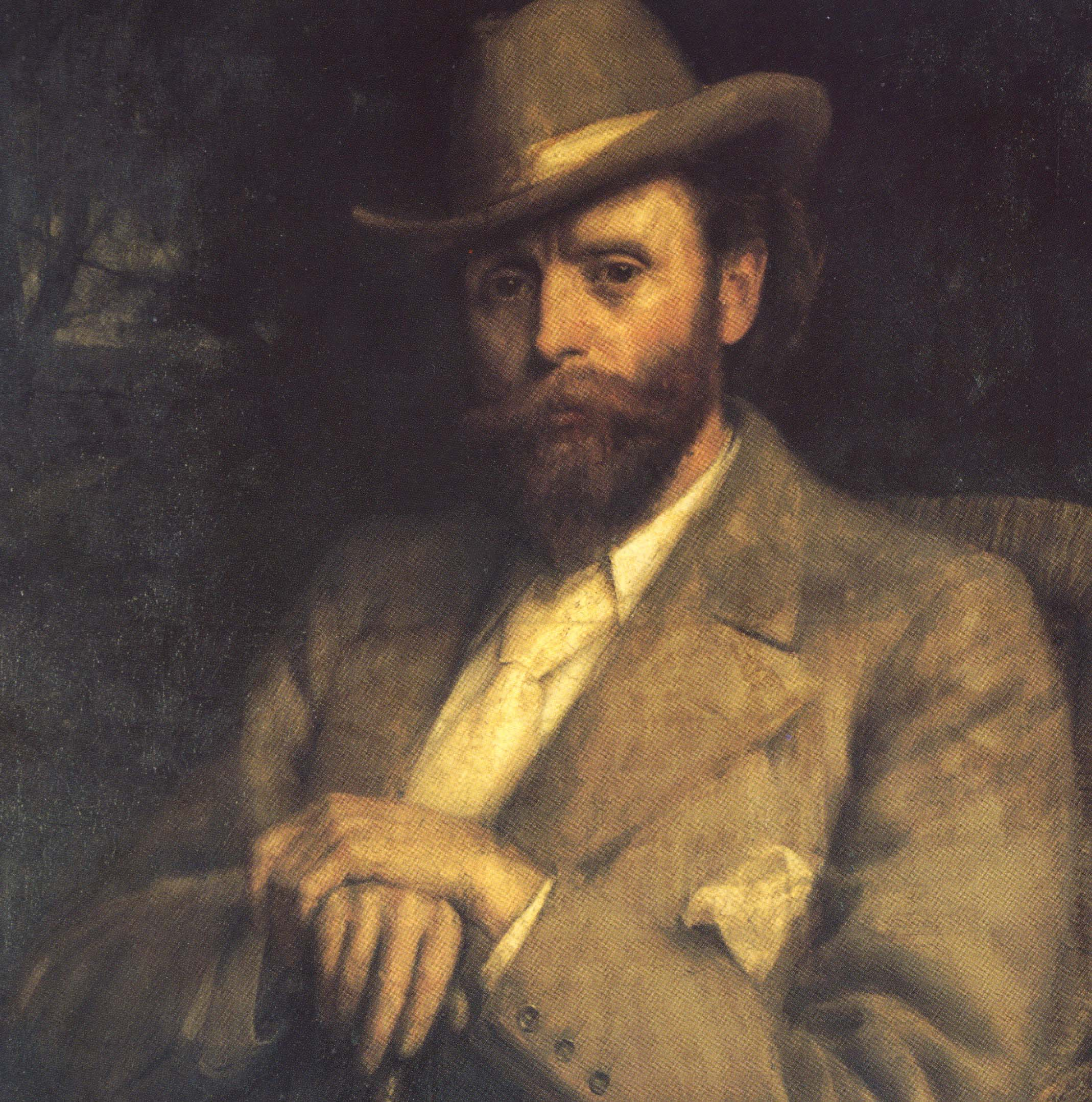
Hall Caine

In writing about the novel for promotional purposes, however, Caine makes no mention of this English case of Daisy Lord. Instead, he attributed his inspiration to a vague story from Manx legal history:

There was [a] judicial scandal in the Isle of Man, which [...] somehow entered into the region of the heroic, partly by reason of the part played in it by a great and noble woman. That was the scandal whereof the main features form the groundwork of the following story - the story of a sin, perhaps a little or at least a natural and pardonable sin, which, being concealed and denied at the beginning, went on and on from consequence to consequence (as all hidden sins must), increasing like a snowball in weight and momentum until it was in danger of submerging with an avalanche the entire community.

Described as a Roman à clef by Caine's modern biographer, the novel also used many themes and occurrences from Caine's own life. One notable instance of this is the episode where Bessie is sent away to be educated before she would be fit to marry the educated and higher-class Victor Stowell, which clearly recalls Caine's having set up Mary Chandler in Sevenoaks in order to be educated before their own marriage. As was usual in Caine's work, he makes no acknowledgement of his main sources, instead writing that "while the principal incidents of the tale I have now to tell owe something to reminiscence, I have exercised so freely the storyteller's licence in telling them [...] that I can claim no better authority for my story than that of an independent creation, with a general background of fact."

Caine first spoke of his ideas for the novel to Bram Stoker in 1912 shortly before his death. Although Caine then began work on the novel in 1913, he put it aside in order to concentrate on writing in support of the Allies during World War I, apparently not picking it up again until one day after the Armistice, on 12 November 1918. By the autumn of 1919 the book had begun to appear in serial form in magazines in America and in the UK, although the episodes had to be later interrupted and held back due to problems with Caine's health and personal life (through strain on his marriage and also at the death of his publisher, William Heinemann). After working on the novel in St. Moritz, the Savoy Hotel in London and at his home, Greeba Castle, in the Isle of Man, the book was completed and ready for publishing in book form in July 1921.

== Plot ==
=== Book I: The Sin ===
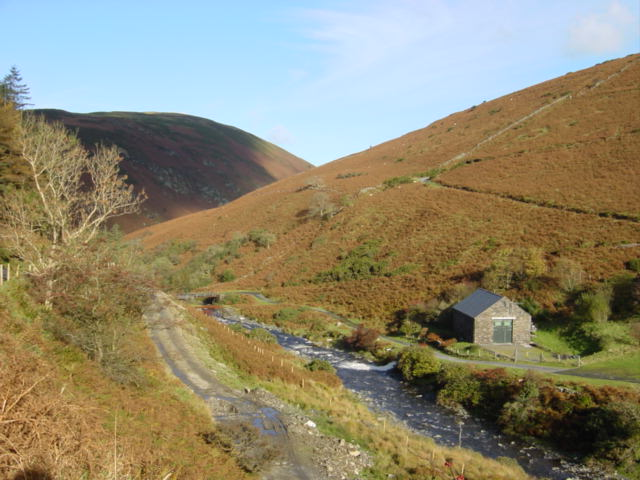
Sulby Glen, the apparent location of Bessie's home

Victor Stowell, the son of the Deemster (judge), was letting his talents go to waste until he met Fenella Stanley, the Lieutenant Governor's daughter, who inspires him to try to make something of himself. His progress in studying to become an advocate is halted when he learns that Fenella has become a Warden at a Lady's Settlement in London. Understanding that her seven-year contract means that she therefore cannot marry him, Victor slides into disrepute. This leads eventually to his giving into the temptation to sleep with Bessie Collister, who he meets at a dance hall in Douglas.

=== Book II: The Reckoning ===
Determined to marry Bessie for the sake of honour, Victor looks to prepare her for her rise in society by enrolling her at a school in Derbyhaven. The only person he tells of this to is his friend, Alick Gell, who regularly visits Bessie on Victor's behalf. Unaware of Victor's night with Bessie, Fenella unexpectedly returns to the island in order to win Victor's heart. He is able to become engaged to Fenella when Alick admits to being in love with Bessie. By this time Victor has proven himself as a uniquely gifted lawyer, both in his oration and sense of justice. In recognition of this he is put forward for the position of Deemster.

=== Book III: The Consequence ===
Bessie realises that she is pregnant by Victor and flees to have the baby secretly at her mother's house. However, when the baby is born she kills it by mistake as she tries to smother its cries in order to avoid discovery. When the baby's body is found, she is arrested and charged with infanticide. Alick agrees to defend her in court, believing emphatically her denial of the charges. Victor is to sit as Deemster for the first time on this case, unaware of who it concerns.

=== Book IV: The Retribution ===
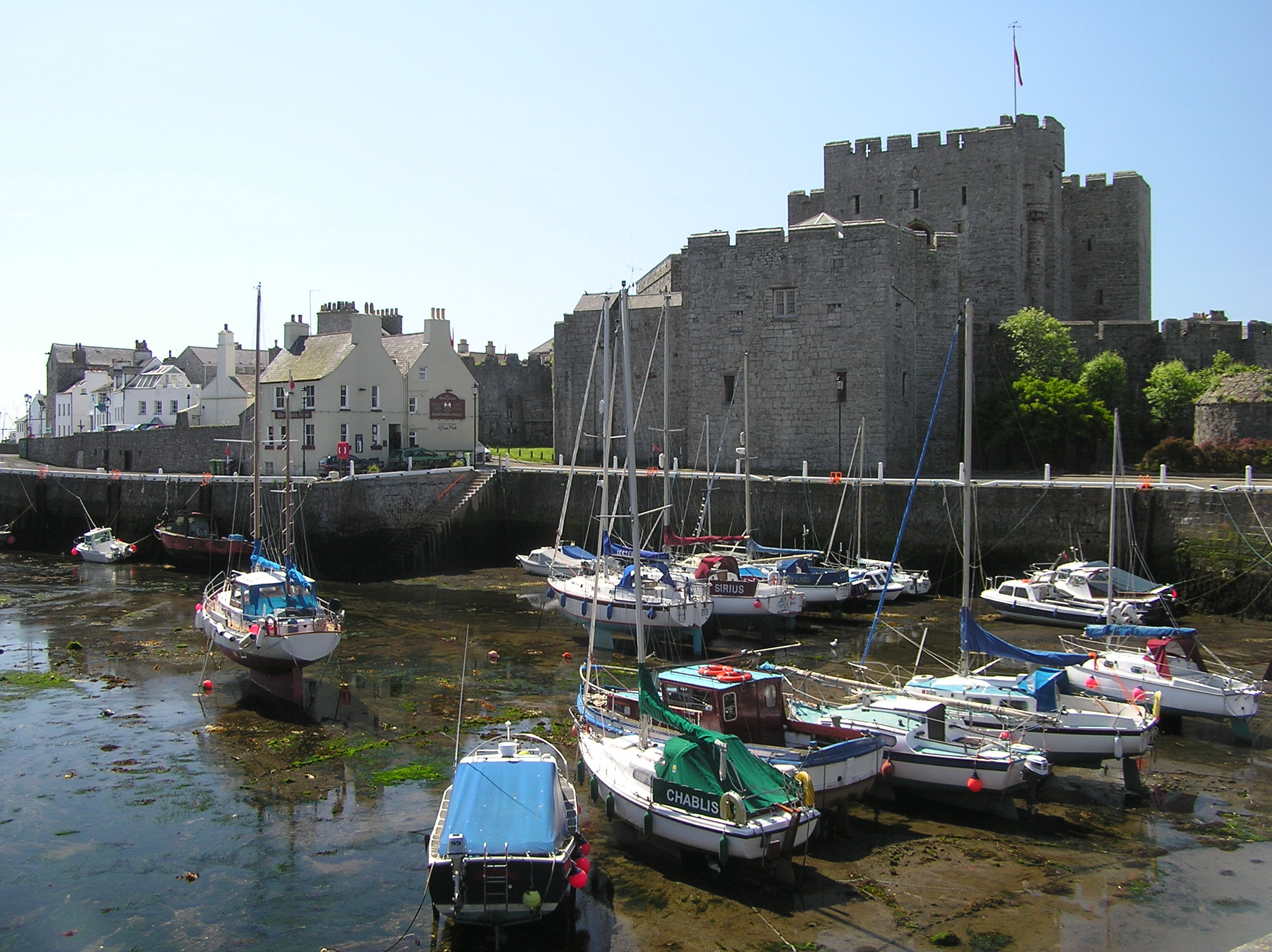
Castle Rushen, where the trials and imprisonments of the novel take place

Victor discovers that the trial is of Bessie but there is no way for him to avoid sitting on the trial. He determines to get the best judgement possible for Bessie in order to mitigate his guilt, even if it compromises justice. However, despite Victor's interfering to support Alick's defence, incontestable evidence appears which links Bessie to the murder. Bound by the law, Victor gives the necessary judgement of execution, with the expectation of the customary mitigation of punishment being issued by the Crown. Both Fenella and Alick leave the courtroom aware of Victor's true involvement with the case.

=== Book V: The Reparation ===
Victor visits Fenella but she tempestuously refuses to forgive him as long as Bessie is imprisoned. Victor then discovers that the Governor has not passed on his request for clemency and so Bessie is to be hanged. Convincing himself that the law is thus unjust and so correct to be overturned, Victor contrives a way of enabling Bessie to escape. He delivers Bessie to Alick, who escapes with her from the island.

=== Book VI: The Redemption ===
When it is discovered that Alick is missing, the Manx people begin to riot, attributing Bessie's escape to him under the tacit blessing of the authorities. The Governor responds by asking Victor to sign a warrant for Alick's arrest. However, realising the rising magnitude of the effects of his crime, Victor confesses to the Governor and asks to resign. When the Governor refuses to accept his resignation, Victor realises that he must make a public declaration of his sins to the people. Fenella realises the extent of her feelings for him and promises to stand by him.

=== Book VII: The Resurrection ===
Victor hands himself in to the police and admits to everything. He is sentenced to two years in the prison at Castle Rushen and is only saved from despair by Fenella's taking a job as a warder in the prison in order to be close to him. The novel concludes with their commitment to one another through marriage, the ceremony being carried out within the prison walls.

== Publication and reception ==
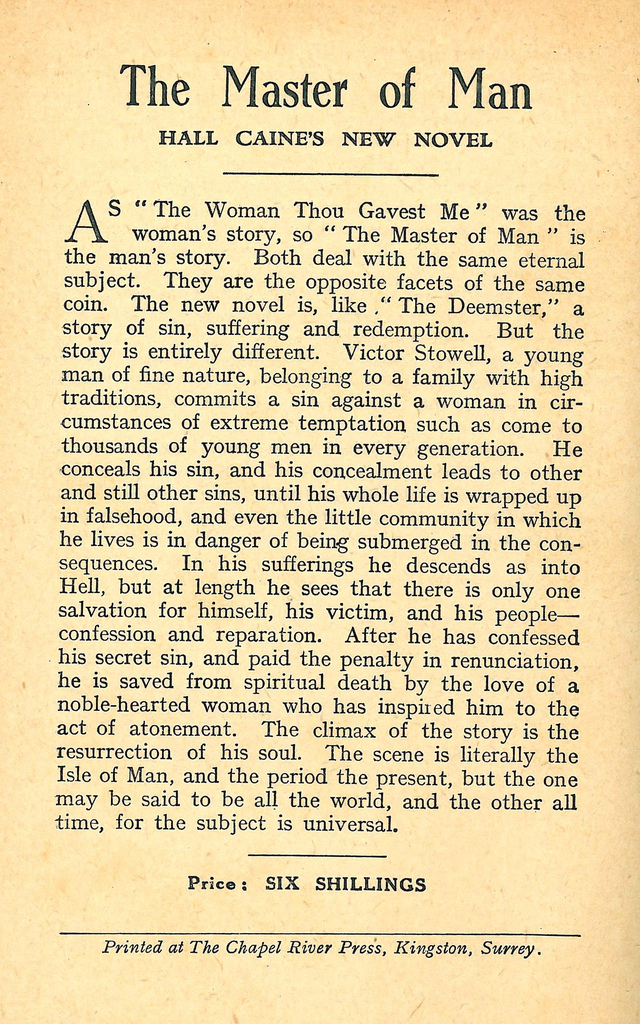
The advert which appeared in re-prints of Caine's other novels

Whilst writing the book, Caine gave it the working title of The Manx Woman. He was convinced to change the title at the suggestion of his agent at Heinemann, Charly Evans, who wrote: "I am convinced that the title The Master of Man has a ring to it like the chimes of Big Ben - something that stirs one to the utmost, and arouses every element of curiosity."

Towards the end of its serialisation in magazines, a draft version of the completed book was sent to various friends, critics and public figures to obtain their responses for use in promotional material for the book. His good friend, Robert Leighton, responded emphatically, calling the book "your supreme achievement… the greatest and most perfect thing you have done. It seems to me you know human nature with absolute success." However, the majority of those who received the book sent acknowledgements that were merely brief and polite. The most flattering extracts from these letters were included at the back of a limited edition of 100 copies of the book that were presented to Caine's family and friends.

The book went on sale in July 1921 with an initial printing of 100,000 copies, announced in the Manx press as "to be immediately made available for the vast English holiday crowd that sets out on its annual vacation about the last week of July." The entirety of this print run sold out within a matter of days and the book immediately topped the best-seller list. However, Caine was bemused and annoyed to find that it held the top-selling spot for only for a short space of time.

The book was published in twelve translations in fifteen countries simultaneously with the British edition; in Australia, Bohemia, Canada, Denmark, Finland, France, Germany, Italy, Japan, the Netherlands, Norway, Russia, Spain, Sweden and the United States. Unlike previous Caine novels, this book failed to reach the top-selling spot in the United States, where the highest place it reached was third.

Quotes from the press reaction to the novel, included in later editions of the book, were remarkable for drawing comparisons between Caine and Tolstoy:

- "A great novel. Will stand as the English Anna Karenina." (The Daily Graphic)
- "Sir Hall Caine in The Master of Man has shown himself to be the English Tolstoy." (J. Cuming Walters in the Manchester City News)
- "It places him to the same rank, as a great world novelist, with Zola, Hugo and Tolstoy." (Leeds Mercury)

However, the general critical response was less positive. In the 27 years since Caine's great success of The Manxman, literary tastes had moved on and his didactic and melodramatic style was now distinctly out of fashion. This was put starkly in a review in The North American Review, where it was noted that "the sentiment aroused by the story depends in large measure upon an arbitrary and unreal contrast between Stowell's character and the things he does and suffers," and that "the novel as a whole is condemned by its sham inevitableness and its reckless idealizations." Caine's modern biographer observes that even just the central plot point of Victor Stowell becoming Deemster "seems so unlikely as to vitiate the story at its central point."

Coming ten years before his death, during which time only The Woman of Knockaloe was published, this novel is considered to "effectively round off the Hall Caine canon."

== Adaptations ==
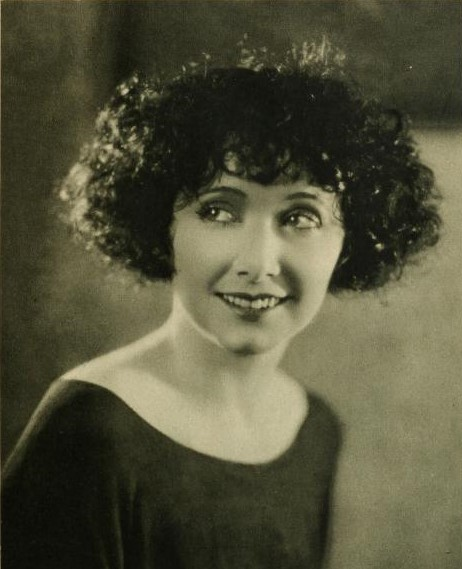
Mae Busch, who played Bessie Collister in the 1924 film adaptation

As for previous Hall Caine novels, a play adaptation was planned. However, it never materialised for The Master of Man. The film version of the book was negotiated by Caine's son, Derwent Hall Caine, who received a call on the matter directly from Samuel Goldwyn even before the book had been published.

The film adaptation, released in America under the title Name the Man, initially had Maurice Tourneur as the director, having shot a film version of Caine's The Christian the previous year. However, he was replaced by Victor Sjöström before filming began. Sjöström wanted to change the leading actress, but Goldwyn Pictures was already committed to a contract with Mae Busch, who was to star as Bessie Collister. The other leading actors in the film included Conrad Nagel as Victor Stowell, Hobart Bosworth as Christian Stowell (Victor's father), Creighton Hale as Alick Gell, and Patsy Ruth Miller as Fenella Stanley. After filming in Hollywood, the film was released in America on 27 January 1924. The advertising for the film's release included the following notable description of the story:

"It is a bit of Reality carved right out of life itself - as real as the face of your mother, or your own hand. It convinces you of its Humanness, of its stature through its Simplicity. [...] No human heart can escape the Drama and the Emotion which Seastrom has lifted from life and transferred to the screen. It speaks the universal language of the heart, no matter how noble or ignoble that heart may be."

== Locations ==
Jurby Church

- Ballamoar: the family home of Victor Stowell, described as a 1,000 acre estate "on the seaward side of the Curraghs." This is an accurate description of the actual house on the Isle of Man.
- Jurby Church: the family church of the Stowell family since the 16th Century. This is accurately described in the novel, and it is also clearly the model for the separate ruined church of Chapter 4, described as "on a lonesome spot by the sea" with an old Norse burial mound marked off by railing.
- Baldromma flour mill: the home of Bessie Collister. Although it is not mentioned which glen this is located in, it is almost certainly to be understood as Sulby Glen. A mill actually named Baldromma on the Isle of Man was in fact located in Maughold.
- Government House: the home of Fenella Stanley and her father. This is a genuine description of the house in Onchan which has been the home of the Lieutenant Governor since 1904.
- Athol Street, Douglas: the street where Victor and Alick lodge whilst students-at-law at the Attorney-General's Office. It is also here that Alick rents a house in preparation for marrying Bessie.
- Old Post Office Street, Ramsey: the location of Victor's lodgings and law practice, where he commits the crucial act of the novel with Bessie.
- Castle Mona, Douglas: the place where Victor and Alick relax before they go to the dancehall where Victor encounters Bessie. This was built in 1804 as a mansion for John Murray, 4th Duke of Atholl. It is evocatively described by Caine in Chapter 8 in its form as a popular destination for English tourists.
- Prospect Hill, Douglas: the focal point of the uprisings that follow Bessie and Alick's escape.
- Derbyhaven: the home of the Brown sisters, where Bessie is sent to be educated.
- Castle Rushen: the location of the trials and imprisonments of both Bessie and Victor.

== Quotations ==
- Love might be the light of life, but men and women all the world over had for one reason or other to marry without it. Millions of hearts in all ages were like old battlefields, with dead things, which nobody knew of, lying about in the dark places. And yet the world went on. [Book I, Chapter 10, p. 113]
- Crime was contagious like disease, and there was an epidemic of violence in the world now. If society was to be saved from anarchy the law alone could save it. [Book II, Chapter 18, p. 192]
- The memory of its great men was a nation's greatest inheritance. [Book III, Chapter 20, p. 208]
- You've opened my ears to the cry of the suffering of woman, and that is the saddest sound, perhaps, that breaks on the shores of life. [Book III, Chapter 23, p. 245]
- A bad man counts on a woman's silence. [Book IV, Chapter 27, III, p. 297]
- With love lost and hope quenched, the soul of the world was dead, and the heavens were dark above him. [Book V, Chapter 32, p. 351]
- There was something childlike in sudden joy; Paradise itself must be a place of children. [Book V, Chapter 37, II, p. 401]
- Was this the mystery of sin - that it must go on and on, from consequence to consequence, deep as the sea and unsearchable as the night? [Book VI, Chapter 41, p. 432]
- Resist this great temptation and peace will come to you. Do the right, and no matter how low you may fall in the eyes of men, you will look upon the face of God. [Book VI, Chapter 42, p. 440]

== Manx cultural references ==
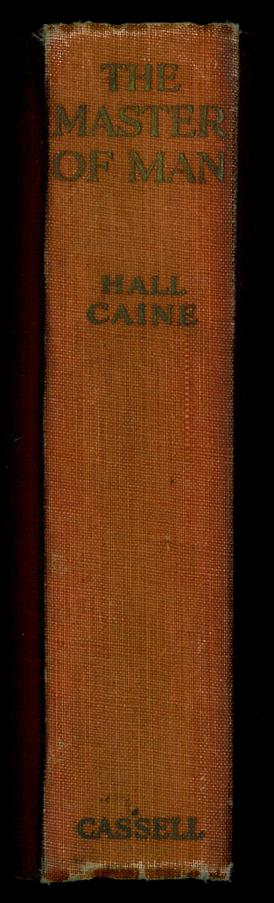
The spine of the 1924 Cassell reprint of the novel

As with his other novels set in the Isle of Man, Caine uses a great many unreferenced sources for the various episodes through which he gives the novel "a rather thin though persuasive effect of primitiveness in the Manx environment," as one American reviewer described it. The more prominent Manx references within the novel include the following:

- Whilst on the Governor's boat Victor and Fenella sing two traditional Manx songs, Mylecharaine ("Molla-caraine" in the text) and "Kiree fo naighty" ("Sheep Under the Snow" in English). The latter Victor reports as having been written in Castle Rushen "by a poor wretch whose life had been sworn away by a vindictive woman." This story behind Kiree fo naighty comes from William Harrison's 1869 Mona Miscellany.
- Whilst on the Governor's ship Victor tells the tale of the Mauthe Dhoo of Peel Castle (Chapter 13, II). This is a well-known story on the island with many variants, but the main sources for Caine would be George Waldron's 1731 History and Description of the Isle of Man and Sophia Morrison's Manx Fairy Tales.
- Whilst in Derbyhaven, Bessie visits the Oie'l Verry Manx language service on Christmas Eve. The Carvel of Bad Women that is sung, described by Caine as a "catalogue of all the bad women mentioned in the Bible, from Eve, the mother of mankind, who brought evil into the world, to 'that graceless wench, Salome,'" can be found in the 1873 Second Series of William Harrison's Mona Miscellany.
- When Bessie visits the "witch" in Cregneash in order to discover her future, she notes a crosh cuirn, a cross of mountain ash, on the back of the door (Chapter 19, II). This it was a common traditional folk practice to ward off witches and fairies, mentioned in numerous sources, including A. W. Moore's 1891 The Folklore of the Isle of Man.
- The episode where Victor imagines himself being judged in the afterlife by Bessie for his sins (Chapter 32) is a clear reference to the poem, 'Catherine Kinrade', by T. E. Brown. The poem imagines Bishop Wilson being judged at heaven's gates by Catherine Kinrade who he punished severely for giving birth to a child out of wedlock, as was described by Caine in Chapter 13.
- In Chapter 25, Victor speaks to Fenella of the belief that a town lies beneath the sea off the coast of the Isle of Man. This is a reference to the story of 'The Enchanted Isle', best known from its inclusion in the 1925 edition of Manx Fairy Tales by Sophia Morrison. The story had earlier appeared in George Waldron's A Description of the Isle of Man in 1731.
- In Chapter 32, Bessie's mother hears a child crying as she walks around the area where Bessie had deposited the body of her child. The crying only stops when she calls out to name the child. This story is taken directly from 'The Child Without A Name', collected by Sophia Morrison in Manx Fairy Tales. The original has the location as by Lag-ny-Killey near Eary Cushlin, with the names for the child as Juan or Joanny, rather than Caine's anglicised versions of the same names, John or Joney.
- When Fenella becomes a warder at Castle Rushen, the rooms allocated to her are those of "Charlotte de la Tremouille (Countess of Derby), when, in the absence of her husband, she held the fortress for weeks against the siege of Cromwell’s forces." This is a reference to Charlotte Stanley (1599–1664). However, her successful repelling of Parliamentarian forces took place in Lancashire at the Siege of Lathom House; she was forced to surrender Castle Rushen to the Parliamentarians upon their arrival on the Isle of Man.

== Trivia ==
- Some of Bessie's phrases and expressions are taken directly from letters that Caine had kept from correspondences with a sweetheart named Marie Lange, from back in 1877.
- 'Baldromma', the name of the mill where Bessie lived with her parents, was actually the name of a farm near Maughold Head. Caine bought some land from the farm in September 1908 with the idea of erecting a 'Caine Memorial Tower' in his own memory. However, the idea never came to fruition.
- Caine's wife was frustrated that the novel should be set in the Isle of Man, a nation that she by this time disliked, writing to him that she wished he'd drop it and "write another Eternal City" (referring to his 1901 novel set in Rome).
- In Chapter 47, Parson Cowley makes the decision to marry Fenella and Victor only after considering a picture of a consumptive sailor who his wife refers to as John James. This is a reference by Caine to his own brother named John James who died of consumption in 1877.
- Caine's first full-length Manx novel, The Deemster, is alluded to in Chapter 29 when he writes: "A man might carry his sin out to sea, and bury it in the deepest part of the deep, but some day it would come [...] to lie open and naked on the beach." This occurs as a central event in the earlier novel, when a murdered body floats to the surface of the sea.
