= Joanna Simon (wine writer) =

British author and wine journalist

- Born: Joanna Simon
- Citizenship: United Kingdom
- Occupations: Author, wine journalist
- Years active: 1987–present
- Known for: Wine column in The Sunday Times
- Notable work: Discovering Wine; Wine With Food; The Sunday Times Book of Wine; Wine: An Introduction; Harrods Book of Fine Wine
- Spouse: Robin Simon

Joanna Simon is a British author and wine journalist known for her column in The Sunday Times for 22 years from 1987 to 2009, where she was also a cookery writer from 2004 to 2009.

She is founding editor of Waitrose Drinks magazine and writes for The World of Fine Wine and Decanter. She is a wine taster for international competitions and presented BBC Radio 4's series The Bottle Uncorked. She has previously been wine and food editor of House & Garden and editor of both Wine and Wine & Spirit magazines.

Simon's books include Discovering Wine, Wine With Food, The Sunday Times Book of Wine, Wine: An Introduction and Harrods Book of Fine Wine.

In September 2008, Simon was one of five UK wine writers, along with Tim Atkin MW, Anthony Rose, Tom Cannavan and Olly Smith, to launch an online wine ratings magazine for the UK called The Wine Gang.

As a lecturer, she has urged Chilean winemakers to "'lighten up' on alcohol levels and the use of oak".

She is married to the art historian and critic Robin Simon.

== See also ==
- List of wine personalities
