= Name the Man =

1924 film by Victor Sjöström

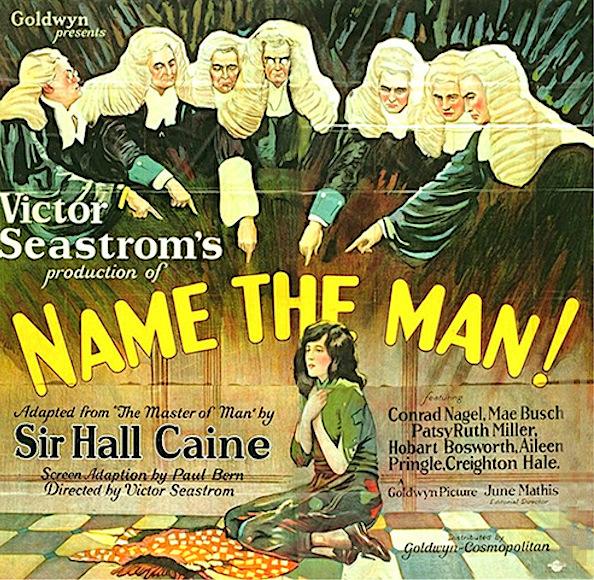
- Directed by: Victor Sjöström
- Written by: Paul Bern
- Based on: The Master of Man by Hall Caine
- Produced by: Goldwyn Pictures
- Starring: Mae Busch
- Cinematography: Charles Van Enger
- Edited by: June Mathis
- Distributed by: Goldwyn Pictures
- Release date: January 27, 1924
- Running time: 80 minutes
- Country: United States
- Language: Silent (English intertitles)

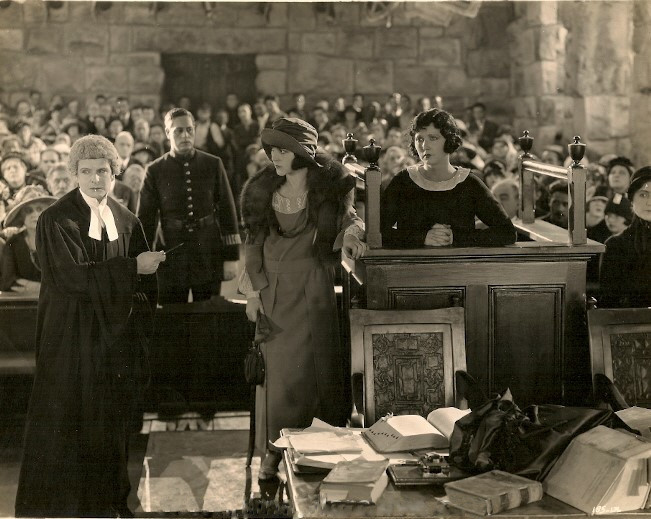
Scene from the film.

Name the Man is a surviving 1924 American silent drama film directed by Victor Sjöström and starring Mae Busch. It was produced and distributed by Goldwyn Pictures in association with Cosmopolitan Productions.

== Plot ==
Arriving home late one evening Bessie is turned out of her home by her stepfather Dan Collister. She has nowhere to go. Bessie is befriended by Victor Stowell, son of the Deemster or Judge of the Isle of Man. Victor is engaged to Fenella Stanley, the daughter of the Island's governor. Bessie stays the night in Victor's apartments. Victor's best friend Alick Gell, tells Victor of his love for Bessie. Victor sees an opportunity for ending his affair with Bessie. Victor's father dies and he succeeds him as Deemster. Later Bessie is arrested and tried for killing her child. The judge trying the case is Victor, the child's father. Bessie is found guilty and is to be executed. An infuriated mob gathers around the prison demanding the name of the man. There are two women who know, Bessie and Fenella who had challenged Victor and obtained his confession. Bessie escapes from prison, where she is awaiting the death sentence. Victor is caught and stoned by the crowd for his share in helping her to escape.

== Cast ==
- Mae Busch as Bessie Collister
- Conrad Nagel as Victor Stowell
- Hobart Bosworth as Christian Stowell
- Creighton Hale as Alick Gell
- Patsy Ruth Miller as Fenella Stanley
- Winter Hall as Gov. Stanley
- Aileen Pringle as Isabelle
- DeWitt Jennings as Dan Collister
- Evelyn Selbie as Lisa Collister
- Mark Fenton as Constable Cain
- Anna Dodge as Mrs. Quayle (credited as Anna Hernandez)
- Mrs. Charles Craig as Mrs. Brown
- Cecil Holland as Coroner
- Lucien Littlefield as Sharf
- William Orlamond as Taubmam
- Charles Hill Mailes as Attorney General (credited as Charles Mailes)
- Andrew Arbuckle as Vondy

== Preservation status ==
Name the Man survives in the Cinematheque royale de Belgique in Brussels, Cinemateket-Svenska Filminstitutet in Stockholm, and the Gosfilmofond archive in Moscow.
