= The British Art Journal =

- Discipline: Art history; British art
- Language: English
- Edited by: Robin Simon

Publication details
- History: 1999–2023
- Publisher: Art Journals Ltd (UK)
- Frequency: Triannual

Standard abbreviations
- ISO 4: Br. Art J.

Indexing
- ISSN: 1467-2006
- JSTOR: britartj
- OCLC no.: 43427170

Links
- Journal homepage

The British Art Journal is now published online only as The British Art Journal: Online.

The British Art Journal was a triannual journal/magazine publishing research on British art from all periods. Its last print volume, XXIV, was published in 2024. On 18 March 2025 it relaunched with Volume XXV, online only, as The British Art Journal: Online. The change in typographical emphasis indicates that, while retaining a focus on the history of British art, the journal now publishes research and reviews on western art more widely.

== History ==
The publication was launched on 1 July 1999 at a reception held at the Thomas Coram Foundation (which became the Foundling Museum) in London. Two issues were published in the initial year. Since then, three issues have been published each year. The journal ceased print publication in December 2023 but will re-appear as an occasional online publication, beginning in March 2025, featuring research, news and reviews.

The Founding Editor is the Welsh art historian and critic, Robin Simon, who established it in collaboration with David N Hodgson as Art Director. The journal is accessible online through JSTOR.

== See also ==
- The Art Journal
