= J. Cuming Walters =

English journalist and writer

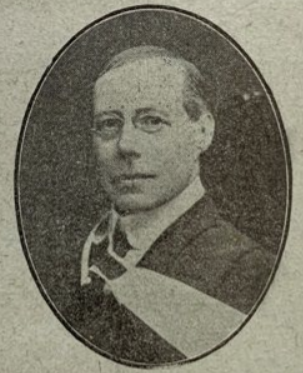
- Born: John Cuming Walters; 1863; Birmingham, England
- Died: 16 July 1933 (aged 69–70); Manchester, England
- Occupations: Journalist; writer

John Cuming Walters (1863 – 16 July 1933) was an English journalist and writer.

== Career ==
Walters was born in Birmingham and was educated at King Edward's School. He began working for the Birmingham Gazette at the age of 17 and joined the sub-editorial staff. He remained working for the Birmingham Gazette for 20 years where he was promoted as lead writer and assistant editor under Alexander W. Still. He was also the editor of Weekly Mercury. He moved to Manchester in 1903 to become editor of the Evening Chronicle. From 1906 to 1932 he was editor of Manchester City News.

Walters was awarded an M.A. by the University of Manchester for his thesis "William Hazlitt and the Early Essayists". He wrote on numerous subjects including English topography, social housing and King Arthur. Walters was president of the Dickens Fellowship from 1910 to 1911. He edited and wrote works on Charles Dickens, Alfred Tennyson and Marie Corelli. He was active in the Lancashire Shakespeare community and in 1889 authored The Mystery of Shakespeare's Sonnets. He lectured on Shakespeare throughout northern England. Walters was president of the Manchester Humane Society and the Stockport Garrick Society. He died in Manchester in 1933.

== Personal life ==
Walters was an anti-vivisectionist, spiritualist and vegetarian. He was a member of the Vegetarian Society.

== Selected publications ==
- The Mystery of Shakespeare's Sonnets (1889)
- Tennyson: Poet, Philosopher, Idealist (1893)
- Clues to Dickens's Mystery of Edwin Drood (1905)
- The Lost Land of King Arthur (1911)
- Phases of Dickens: The Man, His Message, And His Mission (1911)
- Some Proofs of Personal Identity (1924)
- The Charm of Lancashire (1929)
- Romantic Cheshire (1930)
- The Spell of Yorkshire (1931)
- Lancashire Ways (1932)
