= Garrick Theatre (Leman St) =

Former theatre in Whitechapel, London, England

Coordinates: 51°30′43″N 0°4′9″W

The Garrick Theatre, also known as Garrick's Subscription, was a small theatre located in Leman St, Whitechapel. The theatre opened in 1831, and closed in about 1881. The theatre was named for the actor, David Garrick, who had made his début at the nearby Goodman's Fields Theatre on 9 October 1741, playing the role of Richard III.

The performance on 11 May 1840 was Marie! and Virginius the Rum’un!, from an existent playbill. The plays were probably melodramas and some indication of the fare available at the time.

The first theatre burned down in 1846, and was rebuilt to open as The Albert and Garrick Royal Amphitheatre. During rebuilding from 1852 to 1854, the neighbour, a gun manufacturer, obtained an injunction against the proprietor, Lawrence Levy, to restrict the height of the adjacent wall so as not to impede light to his premises. The theatre was managed by Lawrence Levy from 1854 until 1864. He returned to manage the theatre between 1867 and 1868. In 1856 E.B. Gaston was Stage Manager. The second theatre had a capacity of 462, although when Lawrence Levy put the theatre up for sale in 1866–1868, he claimed it "will hold 1,600 persons" and "can be made to hold 2,500", and then in 1868 was claiming "Was built for a circus" and "Holds 1,700 persons; can be made for 8,000".

A young Barney Barnato is reputed to have begged pass outs from theatre leavers, to sell them on to others for a halfpenny.

After actor-manager J. B. Howe's bankruptcy in 1875, the theatre remained empty until 1879. Actress-manageress May Bulmer then ran the theatre until it was demolished, having a personal success in the light opera A Cruise to China. Although Lawrence Levy had died in 1873, the theatre was still part of his estate in 1882 when his trustee testified at the Old Bailey in the trial of two men called Culver and Jacobs. They had been claiming to hold the lease of the theatre, and had fraudulently been taking payments from actors on the promise of providing them with engagements. The site of the theatre is today occupied by the old Leman Street Police Station, built in 1891 and the Garrick Pub.
