= Robin Simon (critic) =

Welsh art historian and critic

Robin Simon (born 23 July 1947) is a Welsh art historian and critic, and editor of the British Art Journal.

Simon was a tenured academic at the University of Nottingham, teaching both English Literature and Art History, and was then Director of the Institute of European Studies in London before becoming editor of Apollo magazine in 1990, where he remained until 1997. In 1999 he founded The British Art Journal (with art director David N Hodgson). He has written and lectured extensively on Italian art of the fourteenth century and on British art, especially of the eighteenth century, on theatre and music, and on the history of cricket. He was art critic of the Daily Mail from 1987 until 2023. He writes about art for The Spectator. From 2007 until 2023 he was visiting professor in the Department of English at University College London and Honorary Professor of Practice from March 2023 to May 2026. Since 2018 he has been Professorial Research Fellow in Art History at Buckingham University.

Simon is the son of the late Archbishop of Wales Glyn Simon; he is married to the wine and food writer Joanna Simon.

== Selected books and publications ==
- The Art of Cricket (with Alastair Smart) (1983)
- The Portrait in Britain and America (1987)
- Buckingham Palace: A complete guide (ed) (1993)
- The King’s Apartments, Hampton Court Palace (ed) (1994)
- The National Trust 1895–1995: 100 great treasures (co-ed) (1995)
- Lord Leighton 1830–1896 and Leighton House (ed) (1996)
- A Rake’s Progress: From Hogarth to Hockney (co-ed) (1997)
- Enlightened Self-interest: The Foundling Hospital and Hogarth (co-ed) (1997)
- Oxford: Art and architecture (ed) (1997)
- Somerset House: The building and collections (ed) (2001)
- Public Artist, Private Passions: The world of Edward Linley Sambourne (ed) (2001)
- The Tyranny of Treatment: Samuel Johnson, his friends, and Georgian medicine (co-ed) (2003)
- Hogarth, France and British Art: The Rise of the Arts in Eighteenth-Century Britain (2007)
- Johan Zoffany: Society Observed (contrib) (2011)
- Richard Wilson and the Transformation of European Landscape Painting (ed with Martin Postle) (2014)
- Hogarth Reynolds Turner: Pittura inglese verso la modernità (contrib) (2014)
- The Royal Academy of Arts: History and Collections (ed) (2018)
- Shakespeare, Hogarth and Garrick: Plays, Painting and Performance (April 2023)
