= Tim Atkin =

British Master of Wine, wine journalist, broadcaster and commentator

- Citizenship: British
- Education: Durham University, London School of Economics
- Occupation: Writer
- Writing career
- Language: English
- Website: timatkin.com

Tim Atkin is a British Master of Wine, and a wine journalist, broadcaster and commentator. He is also a judge of several international wine competitions and a photographer.

== Career ==
Atkin writes for a number of publications, including: a monthly column in Woman and Home, the Wine List Inspector for The Economist's Intelligent Life and Wine Editor at Large at Off Licence News. He also regularly contributes to: The World of Fine Wines, Imbibe, and Australian Gourmet Traveller Wine. On television, he appears regularly on BBC One's Saturday Kitchen as one of the programme's wine experts. In September 2012, Atkin appeared on a BBC One Inside Out programme about the English wine industry. On radio, he does interviews on Radio 4's Today Programme and Eddie Mair's PM show, among others.

Atkin judges several international wine competitions: he is as co-chairman of the International Wine Challenge and chairman of the New Wave Spain Awards, the South African Top 100 and the Vins de Pays Top 100. He speaks and teaches at wine conferences, wine associations, consumer, corporate and charity events.

Atkin is one of the Three Wine Men (together with Olly Smith and Oz Clarke), which holds events around the UK to bring wine consumers together with wine and food retailers and producers. Atkin's have been published in The Guardian, The Telegraph and The World of Fine Wines and exhibited in Beirut, Gigondas and London.

Previously, Atkin published a column in The Observer, Observer Food Monthly, and his interviews were published in The Guardian and The Observer.

In early 2010, Atkin's weekly column in The Observer was reduced to two or three wine recommendations and he moved to The Times the following month, where he had a weekly column for a year. Atkin commented: "I am sad that The Observer has decided to reduce the scope of its wine coverage at a time when people need reliable advice more than ever. I will miss the challenge of writing what was (I hope) an engaging, informed and entertaining piece each week". In protest, a Facebook group called "Save the Wine Column" was formed and quickly amassed considerable support. At the time several newspapers had slashed their wine columns, for example The Sunday Times (Joanna Simon), The Independent on Sunday (Richard Ehrlich), and The Wall Street Journal (Dorothy Gaiter and John Brecher).

== Education ==
Atkin holds a BA from Durham University in Modern Languages and a master's degree from the London School of Economics in European Studies. He became a Master of Wine in 2001, winning the Robert Mondavi Award for the best theory examination. He is a Caballero del Vino, a Chevalier du Tastevin and a member of the Ordre du Bontemps.

== Awards ==
- 1988, 1990, 1993, 2004, 2006: Glenfiddich Wine Writer of the Year
- 1991, 1992, 1994, 1996: UK Wine Guild Wine Correspondent of the Year
- 1994: Wines of France Award
- 1995: The Bunch Award for Wine Journalism
- 1995: Waterford Crystal Wine Correspondent of the Year
- 1999, 2002, 2003, 2004: Lanson Black Label Award
- 2005: Wines of Portugal Award
- 2007: International Wine & Spirit Communicator of the Year
- 2007: World Food Media Awards Best Drink Journalist
- 2009: Louis Roederer International Wine Columnist of the Year
- 2011: Born Digital Award for www.timatkin.com and Louis Roederer Wine Website of the Year
- 2013: Louis Roederer Wine Website of the Year
- 2014: Fortnum & Mason Awards Online Drink Writer of the Year, Louis Roederer Online Communicator of the Year Award, Harpers' French Wine Awards Best French Wine Writer/Critic Award
- 2015: Louis Roederer Feature Writer of the Year Award
- 2018: Louis Roederer Online Communicator of the Year Award

== See also ==
- List of wine personalities
