= Garrick Bar =

Pub in Northern Ireland

Coordinates: 54.59724°N 5.92666°W

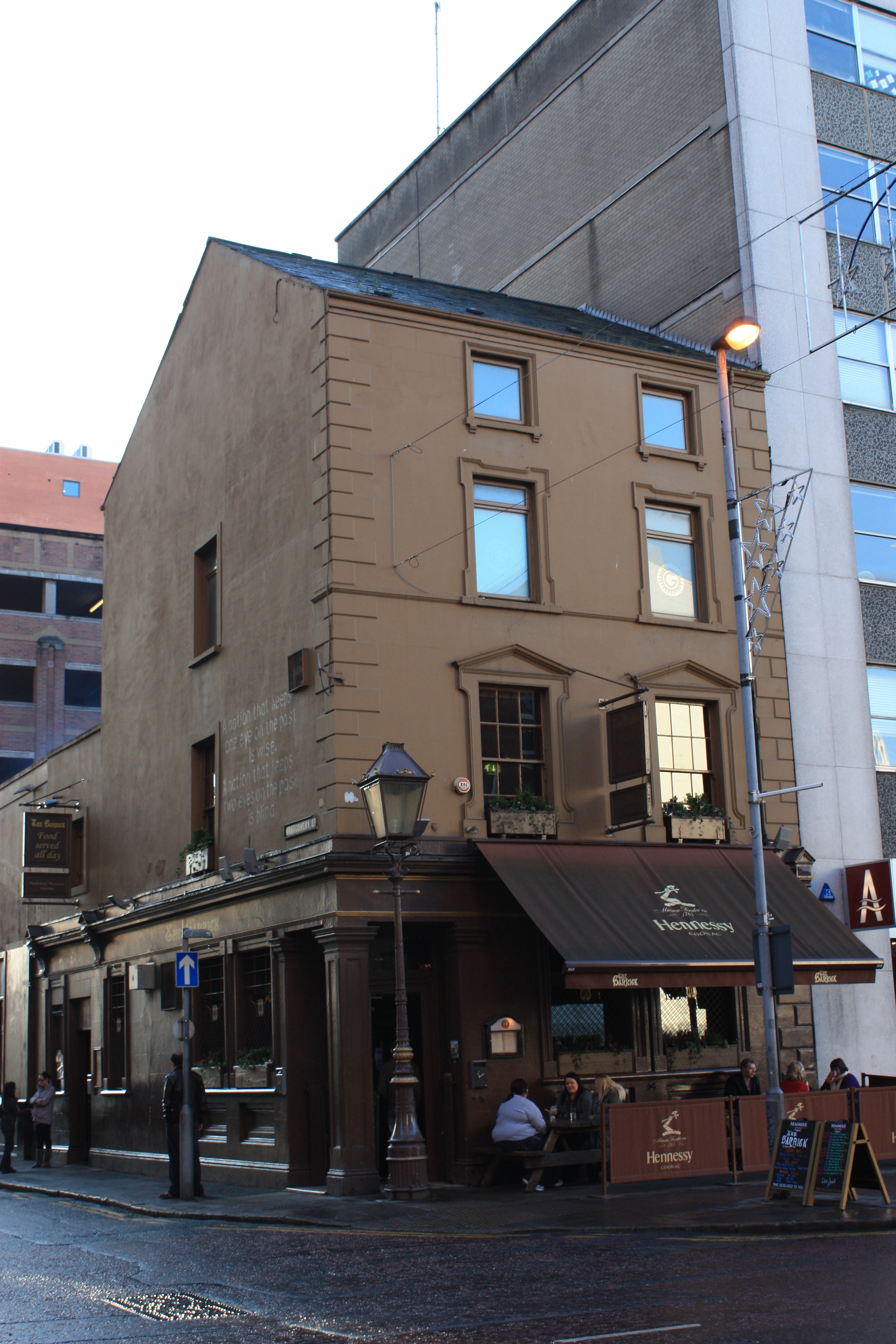
Garrick Bar, December 2009

The Garrick Bar is a pub in Belfast, Northern Ireland, situated at 29 Chichester Street in the city centre. It was established in 1870 and is one of the oldest pubs in Belfast. It serves a range of locally sourced pub food. The Front Bar in the Garrick hosts traditional music sessions, while the Back Bar hosts the Belfast Music Club and resident and guest DJs.

It is a traditional pub with a Victorian decor, dark wood ceilings and panelling, booths with leather benches, tiled floors, and brass oil lamps. The traditional top floor room features a display of barometers and Venetian mirrors. In 2006, the bar was sold for £1.7 million to Bangor entrepreneur Bill Wolsley’s Beannchor Group. It was then closed for six weeks for refurbishment, taking out all the gambling machines, TV's, and jukeboxes to create a classic pub with music rooms.
