= Garrick Theatre, Stockport =

Theatre in Stockport, England

Coordinates: 53.4081°N 2.1616°W

Garrick Theatre
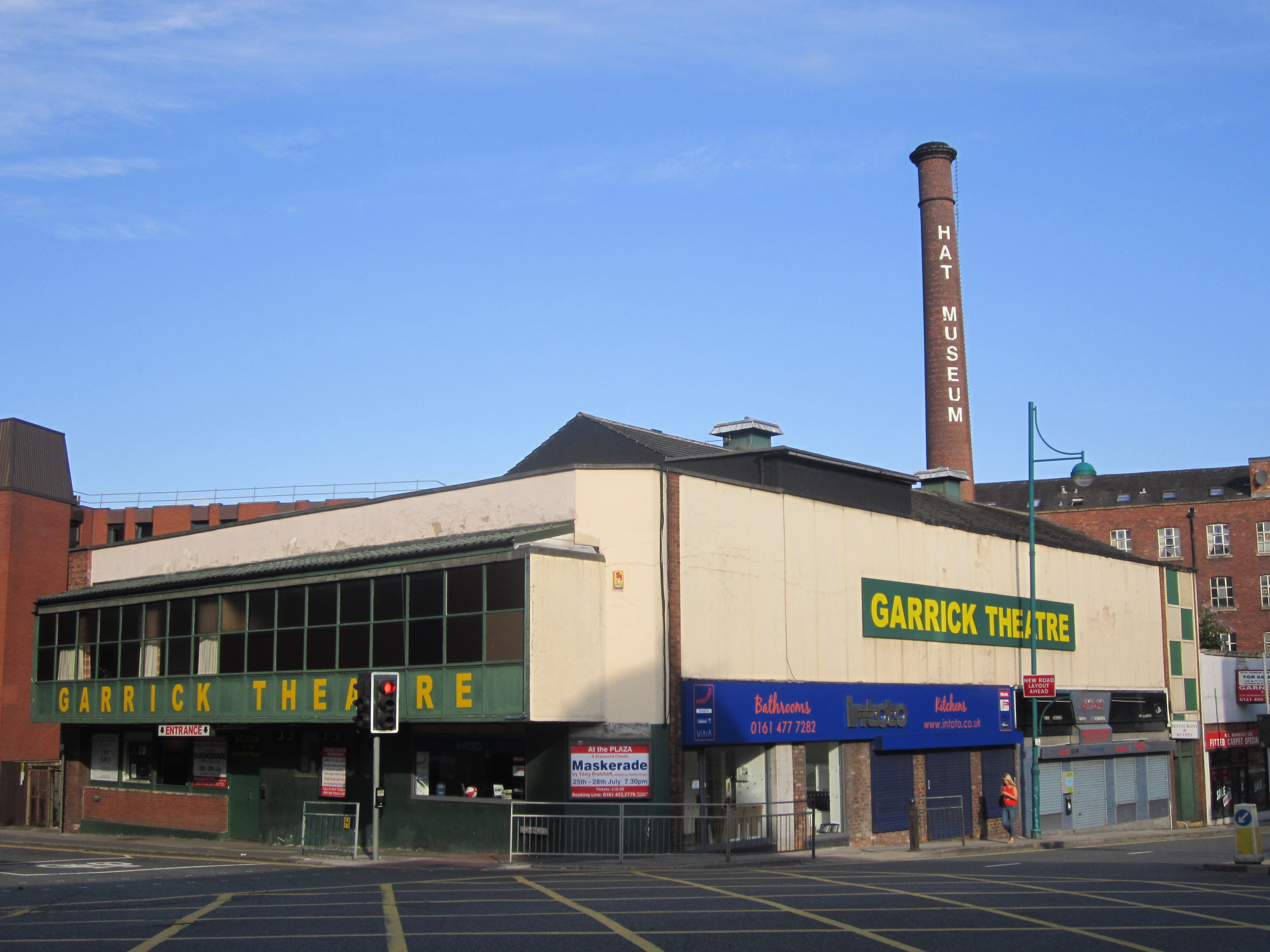
- The theatre in 2012
- Interactive map of Garrick Theatre
- Address: Exchange Street; Wellington Road South; Stockport, Greater Manchester; England
- Type: Theatre

Construction
- Opened: 24 October 1901
- Years active: 1901–present

Website
- stockportgarrick.co.uk

Garrick Theatre is a theatre in Stockport, Greater Manchester, England, founded in 1901. In 1904 it obtained its own premises in Cobden Place, Wellington Street. It is the oldest "little theatre" in the United Kingdom, being defined as being an amateur theatre that owns, leases or otherwise has control of its own premises.

== History ==
=== Foundation and early years ===
In the summer and autumn of 1901, the drama group that was based at the Stockport Unitarian Sunday School on Petersgate was rehearsing a production of The Merchant of Venice. The church organist who was also directing the production and who was a qualified engineer, Edwin T. Heys, decided that to avoid the tortuous trek through the church on the floor above the playing space to get from one wing to the other, the solution would be to dig a tunnel under the stage. This he and his headstrong colleagues proceeded to do until the excavations were discovered by the authorities and put a stop to. The incensed actors gathered at the Church Coffee Tavern opposite under the chairmanship of Heys on 24 October and formed themselves into an independent dramatic literary company which they decided to call the Garrick Society. Journalist J. Cuming Walters was president.

It was decided that the production in rehearsal would be the first play presented by the new society and a semi-professional director, Ryder Boys, was engaged to produce the work at the Mechanics Institute at the end of February and the beginning of March 1902. It played to great acclaim and was followed in the same year by Richard Brinsley Sheridan's The School for Scandal and then by Macbeth and The Rivals. Some of the larger scale plays were performed at Stockport's Frank Matcham theatre, the Theatre Royal. The premises on Wellington Street were used for more intimate productions and ones which had not been licensed by the Lord Chamberlain such as Maurice Maeterlinck's Monna Vanna and several works by Ibsen and Shaw.

Despite the calling up of many of the society's young men during the First World War, the society continued its work during the war years and seems to have escaped relatively unscathed, continuing to present between four and eight plays per season until peace came in November 1918.

=== 1920–1962 ===
During the First World War, a scheme for acquiring new larger premises was being mooted. This came to fruition in 1920 with the formation of a limited company, the chairman of which was Edwin Heys. The building which was acquired was on the corner of Exchange Street and Wellington Road South where the present theatre stands today. It was then an engineering works and contained various other enterprises including a Spiritualist Church. In 1925 funds were raised to raise the roof, which was until then supported on low beams and in 1935–1936 new rooms were constructed above what was then called the Minor Hall and which is now the bar and studio theatre.

As well as continuing to present productions of the classics, especially Shakespeare, Ibsen and Shaw, the 1920s and 1930s saw a flowering of home-grown talent in the presentation of works by Garrick members including Ross Hills, Channon Collinge, Percy Corry and Alfred Jepson. The Second World War seems to have been more traumatic for the society than the First, with many members who had joined the forces not returning and several of the founder members dying during the war years. However, the seasons of plays continued throughout, boosted it would seem by an influx of members of Stockport Operatic Society who had ceased to function for the time being, enabling the Garrick to put on several Gilbert and Sullivans and a couple of other operas.

After the war, a general sense of exhaustion and depression seemed to have set in, relieved somewhat by the 50th-anniversary celebrations in 1951 and even more so by the extensive rebuilding and refurbishment work in 1962, necessitated and financed by the local council's compulsory purchase of a "slice" of the building to enable the widening of Exchange Street. The cantilevered extension over the Exchange Street pavement was constructed, the auditorium was raked, new seats installed, the windows closed off and open fireplaces removed. The name of the building, which had until then been known as the Garrick Hall, was changed to the Garrick Theatre as it has been known ever since.

=== 1962–present ===
The installation of a bar in 1973, despite strong opposition from certain die-hard members, further lifted the spirits as did another major reconstruction of the auditorium and the creation of further rooms at the rear in 1984; much of the preparatory work was carried out by members themselves. Most recently a major reconstruction of the bar area, providing facilities for it to double as a studio theatre, took place in 2010.

From the outset the Garrick Theatre has often been adventurous in its choice of plays, with a particular love of Shakespeare which continues to this day (recently being involved with the RSC's Open Stages project), early productions of Ibsen, Shaw, Synge, Yeats, Hauptmann and Tagore gradually giving way in the middle years of the century to the more frivolous offerings of Noël Coward, W. Somerset Maugham, Alan Melville and the like. After the radical shift in theatrical tastes caused by the 1956 production of John Osborne's Look Back in Anger the Garrick gradually began to come up to date with productions of Osborne himself, Samuel Beckett, Arnold Wesker, Arthur Miller, David Hare and Simon Gray whilst continuing to lighten the mix with Alan Ayckbourn, popular West End hits and the occasional musical when the membership's talents lay in that direction. In the 1980s and 1990s, a number of amateur premieres were secured, including A Little Night Music (Sondheim & Wheeler), My Mother Said I Never Should (Charlotte Keatley), Corpse (Gerald Moon), Fools and Star-Spangled Girl (both by Neil Simon) and also from the mid-1970s to the late 1990s the theatre took several productions on tour to Buxton Opera House, the Isle of Man Festival, the Dundalk Festival in Ireland, several venues in the US and also two trips to Stockport's twin town in Germany, Heilbronn.

Since the bar refurbishment the Garrick Studio has produced a wider variety of plays, presenting intimate, exciting and sometimes controversial plays by playwrights such as David Mamet, David Harrower, Jean-Paul Sartre, Yasmina Reza, Andrew Bovell, John Godber, Laura Wade, Dennis Kelly, Joe Penhall and Simon Stephens.

The Youth Theatre has flourished in the past few years, presenting main stage productions and showcase performances each year. In recent years, Garrick Youth has grown from one weekly group of 20 students (aged 14–18) to five weekly groups for around 100 students (aged 7–18).

In 2016 BBC Radio 4 recorded Mark Steel's in Town from the theatre.

In May 2018, Stockport Garrick hosted their first Stockport Festival of New Writing. A week long festival championing new writing for the stage. It included development performances of brand new plays by Stockport and Greater Manchester playwrights and talks and workshops by theatre makers. Simon Stephens, patron for the festival, gave a talk discussing his Stockport plays (Port, On the Shore of the Wide World, Punk Rock and Blindsided) with Stockport actor Katie West. Extracts from the Stockport plays were directed and performed by Garrick members.

== Notable honorary members ==
- Harley Granville-Barker (1877–1946), actor, director, playwright, manager, critic, and theorist
- Peter Barkworth (1929–2006), actor
- Sir Johnston Forbes-Robertson (1853–1937), actor and theatre manager
- John Galsworthy (1867–1933), novelist and playwright
- Dame Wendy Hiller (1912–2003), film and stage actress
- Sir Ian McKellen (b. 1939), actor
- Simon Stephens (b. 1971), playwright
- Dame Ellen Terry (1847–1928), actress
- Dame Sybil Thorndike (1882–1976), actress
