= Sparkling wine =

Wine with significant levels of carbon dioxide

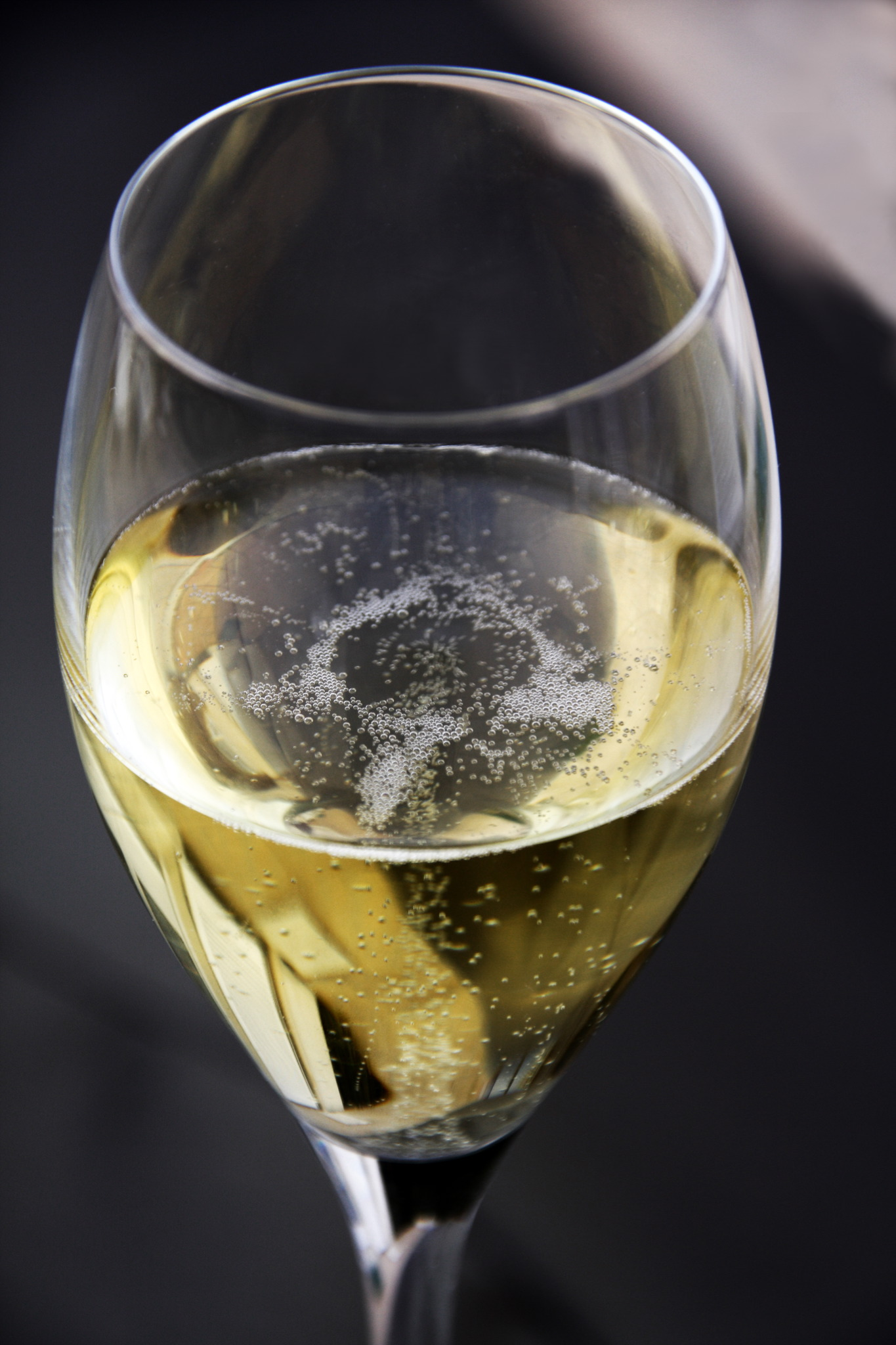
A glass of champagne

Sparkling wine is a wine with significant levels of carbon dioxide in it, making it fizzy, unlike a still wine. While it is common to refer to this as champagne, European Union countries legally reserve that word for products exclusively produced in the Champagne region of France. Sparkling wine is usually either white or rosé, but there are examples of red sparkling wines such as the Italian Brachetto, Bonarda and Lambrusco, and the Australian sparkling Shiraz. The sweetness of sparkling wine can range from very dry brut styles to sweeter doux varieties (French for 'hard' and 'soft', respectively).

The sparkling quality of these wines comes from their carbon dioxide content and may be the result of natural fermentation, either in a bottle, as with the traditional method, in a large tank designed to withstand the pressures involved (as in the Charmat process), or as a result of simple carbon dioxide injection in some cheaper sparkling wines.

In European Union countries, the word "champagne" is reserved by law only for sparkling wine from the Champagne region of France. The French terms mousseux and crémant refer to sparkling wine not made in the Champagne region, such as Blanquette de Limoux produced in southern France. Sparkling wines are produced around the world, and are often referred to by their local name or region, such as Prosecco, Franciacorta, Trento DOC, Oltrepò Pavese Metodo Classico and Asti from Italy (the generic Italian term for sparkling wine being spumante), espumante from Portugal, cava from Spain, and Cap Classique from South Africa. Sparkling wines have been produced in Central and Eastern Europe since the early 19th century. "Champagne" was further popularised in the region late in the century, when József Törley started production in Hungary using French methods, learned as an apprentice in Reims. Törley has since become one of the largest European producers of sparkling wine. The United States is a significant producer of sparkling wine today, with producers in numerous states. Recently, production of sparkling wine was restarted by United Kingdom winemakers after a long hiatus.

== History ==
Effervescence has been observed in wine throughout history and has been noted by Ancient Greek and Roman writers, but the cause of this mysterious appearance of bubbles was not understood. Over time it has been attributed to phases of the moon as well as both good and evil spirits.

The tendency of still wine from the Champagne region to lightly sparkle was noted in the Middle Ages but this was considered a wine fault and was disdained in early Champagne winemaking although it was the pride of other historic sparkling wine production areas like Limoux. Blanquette de Limoux, from Languedoc, shows up in writings from as early as 1531 by the Abbey monks of Saint-Hilaire.

Dom Pérignon was originally charged by his superiors at the Abbey of Hautvillers to get rid of the bubbles since the pressure in the bottles caused many of them to burst in the cellar. Later, when deliberate sparkling wine production increased in the early 18th century, cellar workers would still have to wear a heavy iron mask that resembled a baseball catcher's mask to prevent injury from spontaneously bursting bottles. The disturbance caused by one bottle's disintegration could cause a chain reaction, with it being routine for cellars to lose 20–90% of their bottles to instability. The mysterious circumstance surrounding the then unknown process of fermentation and carbonic gas caused some critics to call the sparkling creations "The Devil's Wine".

The British were the first to see the tendency of wines from Champagne to sparkle as a desirable trait and tried to understand why it produced bubbles. Wine was often transported to England in wooden wine barrels where merchant houses would then bottle the wine for sale. During the 17th century, English glass production used coal-fueled ovens and produced stronger, more durable glass bottles than the wood-fired French glass. The English also rediscovered the use of cork stoppers, once used by the Romans but forgotten for centuries after the fall of the Western Roman Empire. During the cold winters of the Champagne region, temperatures would drop so low that the fermentation process was prematurely halted—leaving some residual sugar and dormant yeast. When the wine was shipped to and bottled in England, the fermentation process would restart when the weather warmed and the cork-stoppered wine would begin to build pressure from carbon dioxide gas. When the wine was opened, it would be bubbly. In 1662, the English scientist Christopher Merret presented a paper detailing how the presence of sugar in a wine led to it eventually sparkling and that by adding sugar to a wine before bottling it, nearly any wine could be made to sparkle. This is one of the first known accounts of understanding the process of sparkling wine and even suggests that British merchants were producing "sparkling Champagne" before the French Champenois were deliberately making it.

== Semi-sparkling wine ==
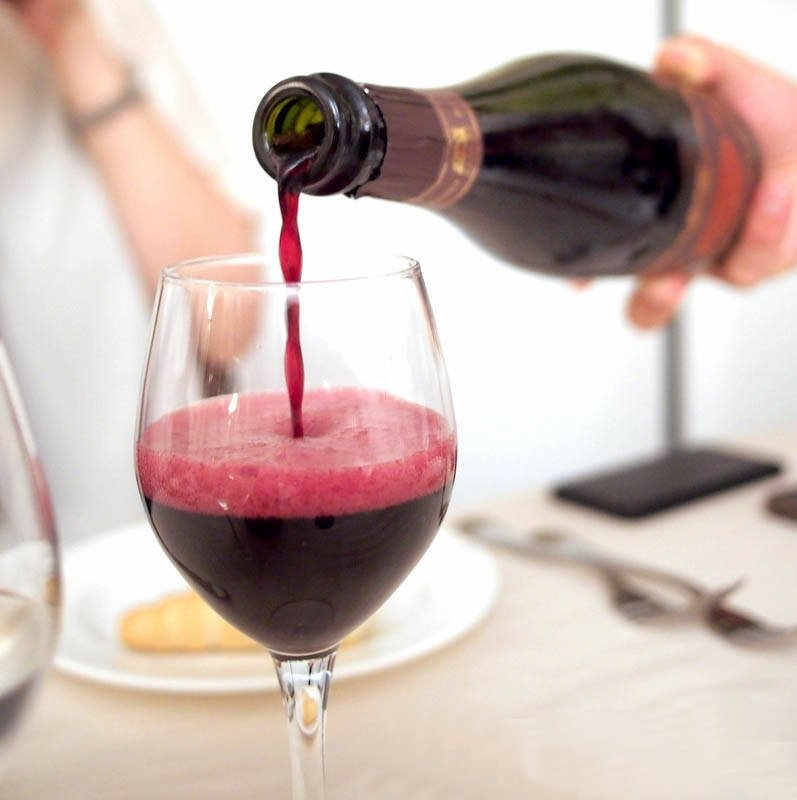
A glass of Lambrusco from Italy

Fully sparkling wines, such as champagne, are generally sold with 5 to 6 standard atmospheres (73 to 88 psi; 510 to 610 kPa) of pressure in the bottle. This is more than twice the pressure found in an automobile tire. European Union regulations define a sparkling wine as any wine with an excess of 3 atmospheres in pressure. These include German sekt, Spanish espumoso, Italian spumante and French crémant or mousseux wines. Semi-sparkling wines are defined as those with between 1 and 2.5 atmospheres of pressures and include German spritzig, Italian frizzante and French pétillant wines. The amount of pressure in the wine is determined by the amount of sugar added during the tirage stage at the beginning of the secondary fermentation with more sugar producing an increased amount of carbon dioxide gas and thus pressure in the wine.

== Red sparkling wine ==
While the majority of sparkling wines are white or rosé, Australia, Italy and Moldova each have a sizable production of red sparkling wines. Of these, Italy has the longest tradition in red sparkling wine-making, particularly along the Apennine side of the Po Valley. Notable wines include Brachetto and Lambrusco. Also very well known and with rich tradition are Gutturnio, Bonarda and sparkling Barbera; in central Italy, lesser known Red Vernaccia produces semi-sweet sparkling reds. In Australia, red sparkling wines are often made from the Shiraz grape.

== Production ==
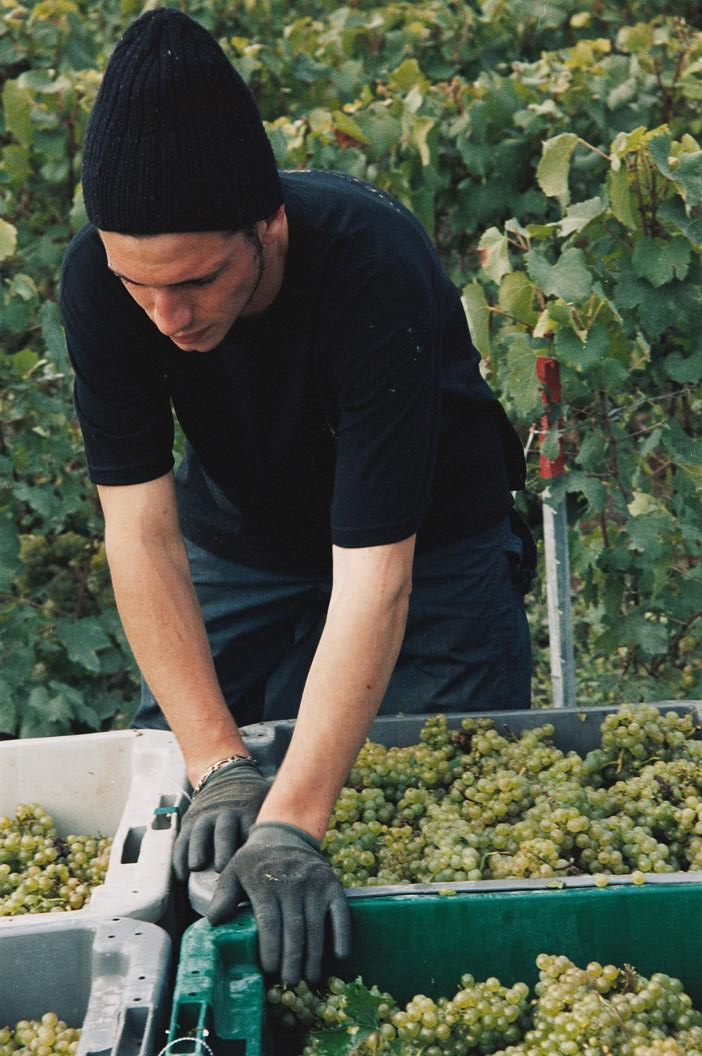
While harvesting grapes destined for sparkling wine, premium producers will take extra care to handle the grapes as gently as possible in order to minimize the extraction of harsh phenolic compounds from the skin.

The viticultural and winemaking practices of making sparkling wine have many similarities to the production of still wine with some noted divergence. At the vineyard, grapes are harvested early when there is still high acid levels. In areas like Australia, winemakers aim to harvest the grapes at 17 to 20° brix (the sugar content of a solution). Unlike still wine production, high sugar levels are not ideal and grapes destined for sparkling wine production may be harvested at higher yields. Care is taken to avoid tannins and other phenolic compounds with many premium producers still choosing to harvest by hand rather than risk mechanical harvesting which may split the berries and encourage maceration between the skins and juice. The press house is often close by the vineyard to where the grapes can be quickly pressed and separated from their skins. Red wine grapes like Pinot noir can be used in the production of white sparkling wines because their juice is initially clear and is only later tinted red through exposure to the color pigments in grape skins. While some skin exposure may be desirable in the production of rosé sparkling wines and some blanc de noirs (white of blacks), most sparkling wine producers take extended precautions to limit the amount of skin contact.

The primary fermentation of sparkling wine begins like most other wines, though winemakers may choose to use specially cultivated sparkling wine yeasts. The wines may go through malolactic fermentation, though producers wishing to make fruitier, simpler wines will usually forgo this step. After fermentation the base wines are then blended to form a cuvée. While there are examples of varietal sparkling wines, such as blanc de blancs (white of whites) made from 100% Chardonnay, most sparkling wines are blends of several grape varieties, vineyards and vintages. Producers with wide access to grapes will use wines from several hundred base wines to create a blend that reflect the "house style" of their non-vintage wine. It is through the initiation of a secondary fermentation that distinguishes sparkling wine production and gives the wine its characteristic bubbles. One of the by-products of fermentation is the creation of carbon dioxide gas. While this is able to be released during the first fermentation, efforts are taken during the second fermentation to retain the gas and have it dissolve into the wine. This creates high pressure within the wine bottle (on average around 5 atmospheres) and wine producers take care to package the wine in strong glass bottles. When the wine is opened and poured into a glass, the gas is released and the wine becomes sparkling.

=== Secondary fermentation ===
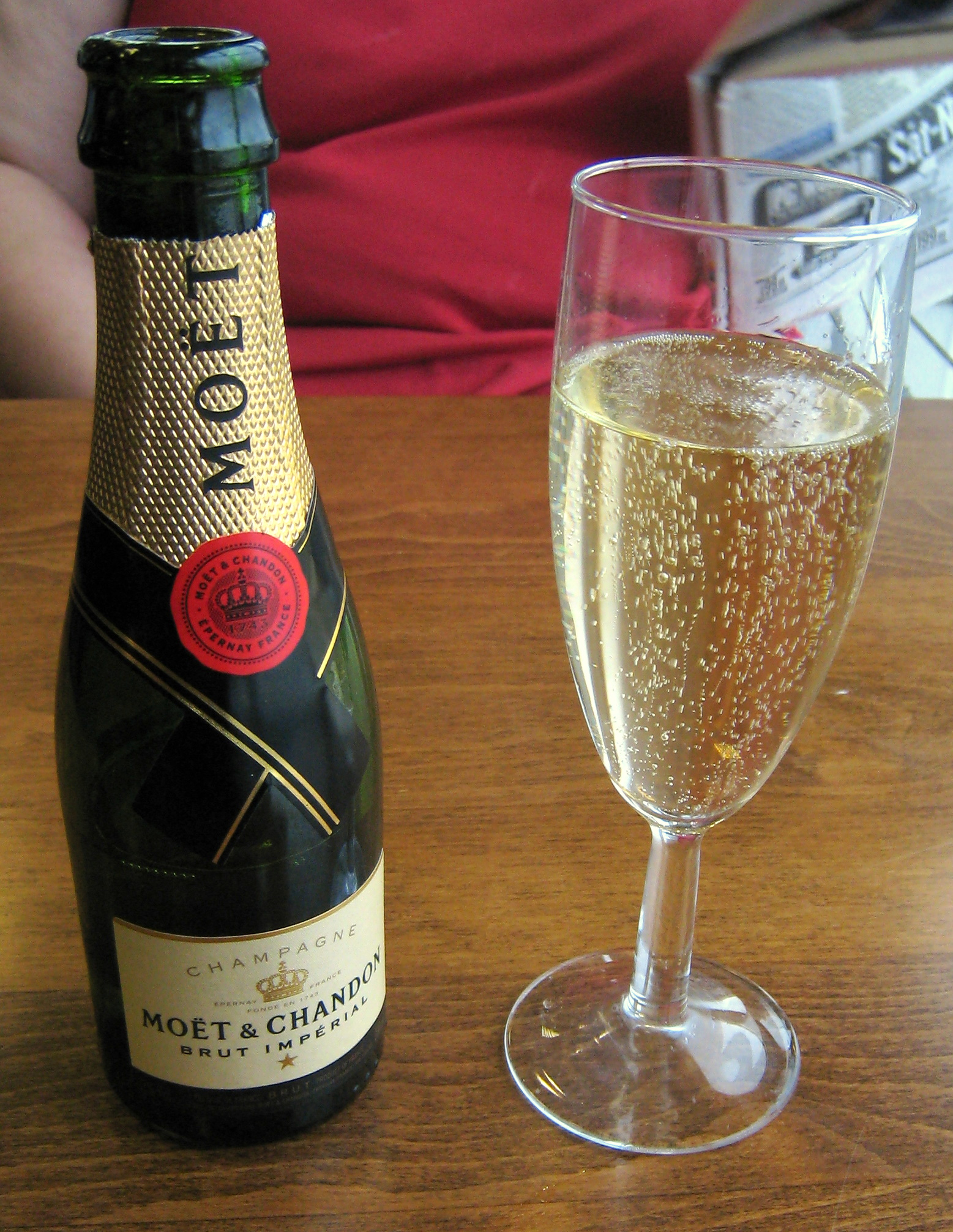
The transfer method is used to make small and large format bottles of sparkling wine, such as this split (quarter bottle) of champagne.

There are several methods used to carry out this secondary fermentation. The most well known is the traditional or "champagne method" where the base cuvée is bottled with a mixture of sugar and yeast. The introduction of a fresh yeast and food source (the sugar) triggers the fermentation process in the bottle that the wine will eventually be sold in. Through the process of riddling and eventually disgorgement, the dead yeast cells (called lees) are removed from the wine while still maintaining the dissolved carbon dioxide gas. A dosage mixture of fresh wine and some sugar syrup is used to adjust the sweetness level of the wine after it has been disgorged.

In the methode ancestrale (ancestral method), the disgorgement step is skipped and the wine is sold with the lees still present as sediment in the wine. In the transfer method, after the wines have gone through the traditional method including riddling and disgorgement, the bottles are emptied into a large tank where they are then transferred to small and large format wine bottles such as 3-litre jeroboam and small split sizes used on airlines. Numerous quality producers worldwide use the "Traditional" method to make their sparkling wines.

The Charmat method takes place in stainless steel fermentation tanks that are pressurized. The fresh yeast and sugar mixture is added to the wine which rapidly stimulates fermentation in the pressurized environment. The wine is then cooled, clarified, and bottled using a counter pressure filler.

The process of carbon injection (or carbonation), the method used to make soda pop fizzy, does not involve initiating a secondary fermentation but rather injecting carbon dioxide gas directly into the wine. This method produces large bubbles that quickly dissipate and is generally only used in the cheapest sparkling wines.

=== Bubbles ===
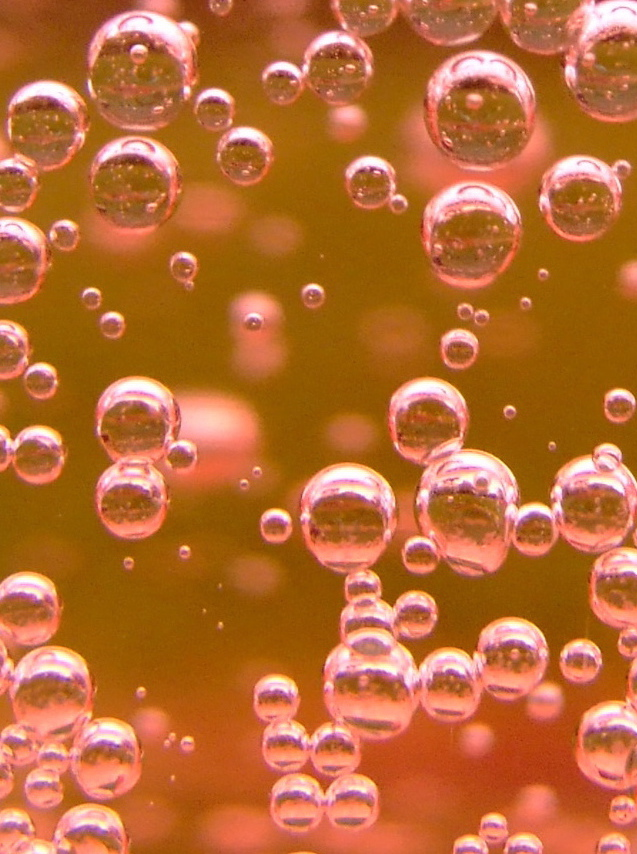
Bubbles in a rosé sparkling wine

An initial burst of effervescence occurs when the sparkling wine contacts the dry glass on pouring. These bubbles form on imperfections in the glass that facilitate nucleation. Nucleations are needed to stimulate the formation of bubbles because carbon dioxide has first to diffuse from the wine solution before it can rise out of the glass and into the air. A poured glass of sparkling wine will lose its bubbliness and carbon dioxide gas much more quickly than an open bottle alone would. The frothiness or "mousse" of the wine, along with the average size and consistency of the bubbles, can vary depending on the quality of the wine and the type of glass used.

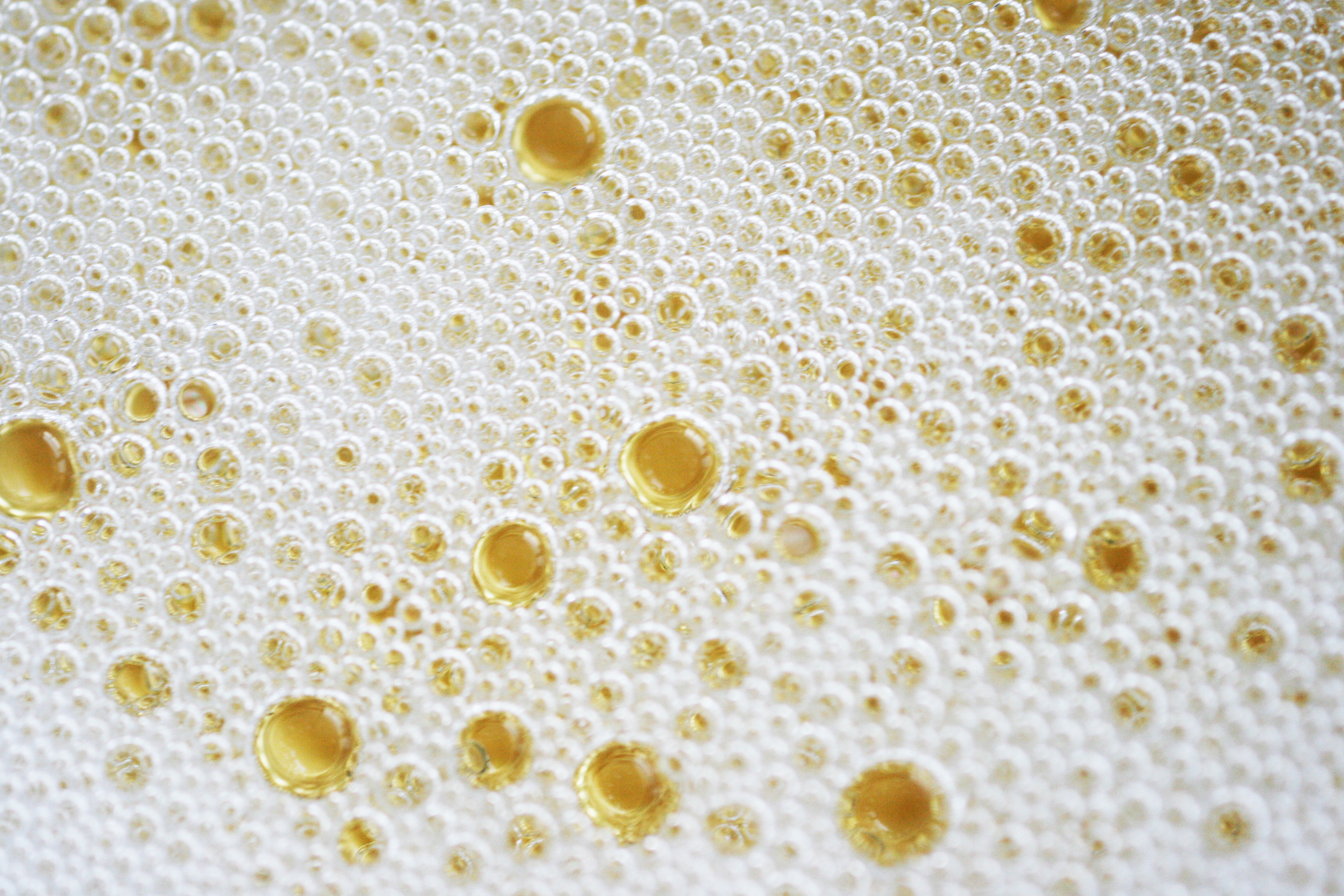
As the bubbles rise to the surface of the glass, they form a frothy mousse.

According to the wine academic Graham Harding, the average bottle of champagne contains enough carbon dioxide to potentially produce 49 million bubbles. Wine expert Tom Stevenson puts the number at 250 million. The bubbles initially form at 20 micrometers in diameter and expand as they gain buoyancy and rise to the surface. When they reach the surface they are approximately 1 millimeter in size. It is speculated that the bubbles in sparkling wine may speed up alcohol intoxication by helping the alcohol to reach the bloodstream faster. A study conducted at the University of Surrey in the United Kingdom gave subjects equal amounts of flat and sparkling champagne which contained the same levels of alcohol. After 5 minutes following consumption, the group that had the sparkling wine had 54 milligrams of alcohol in their blood while the group that had the same sparkling wine, only flat, had 39 milligrams.

Putting a spoon in an open bottle of sparkling wine to keep it bubbly is a myth. A proper stopper is much more effective.

=== Sweetness ===
The amount of sugar (dosage) added after the second fermentation and aging varies and will dictate the sweetness level of the sparkling wine. Wines produced within the European Union must include the sweetness level on the wine label. For wines produced outside the EU, the sweetness level is not required but if it is included on the label the terms used must conform to EU guidelines.

A French champagne designated as "extra dry"

- Brut natural or brut zéro: Less than 3 grams of sugar per litre.
- Extra brut: Less than 6 grams of sugar per litre.
- Brut: Less than 12 grams of sugar per litre.
- Extra dry or extra sec: 12–17 grams of sugar per litre. Despite its name, this is sweeter than brut.
- Dry or sec: 17–32 grams of sugar per litre.
- Demi-sec: 32–50 grams of sugar per litre. This is a sweet style.
- Doux: More than 50 grams of sugar per litre. This is the sweetest category.

== French sparkling wine ==
The most well-known example of sparkling wine is that of champagne from the Champagne wine region of France. On average, champagne is responsible for about 8% of worldwide sparkling wine production with many other regions emulating the "champagne style" in both grapes used (generally Chardonnay, Pinot noir and Pinot Meunier) and production methods—sometimes referred to as the "champagne method". French sparkling wines made according to the champagne method of fermentation in the bottle, but sometimes use different grape varieties, are known as crémants and are governed under their own Appellation d'origine contrôlée (AOC) regulations. Another style of sparkling wine found in France are those made according to the methode ancestrale which skips the process of disgorgement and produces wines with slight sweetness and still containing the particles of dead yeast matter in the form of lees in the bottle. The regions of Gaillac, Limoux and Clairette de Die are the most well-known producers of methode ancestrale wines.

=== Champagne ===
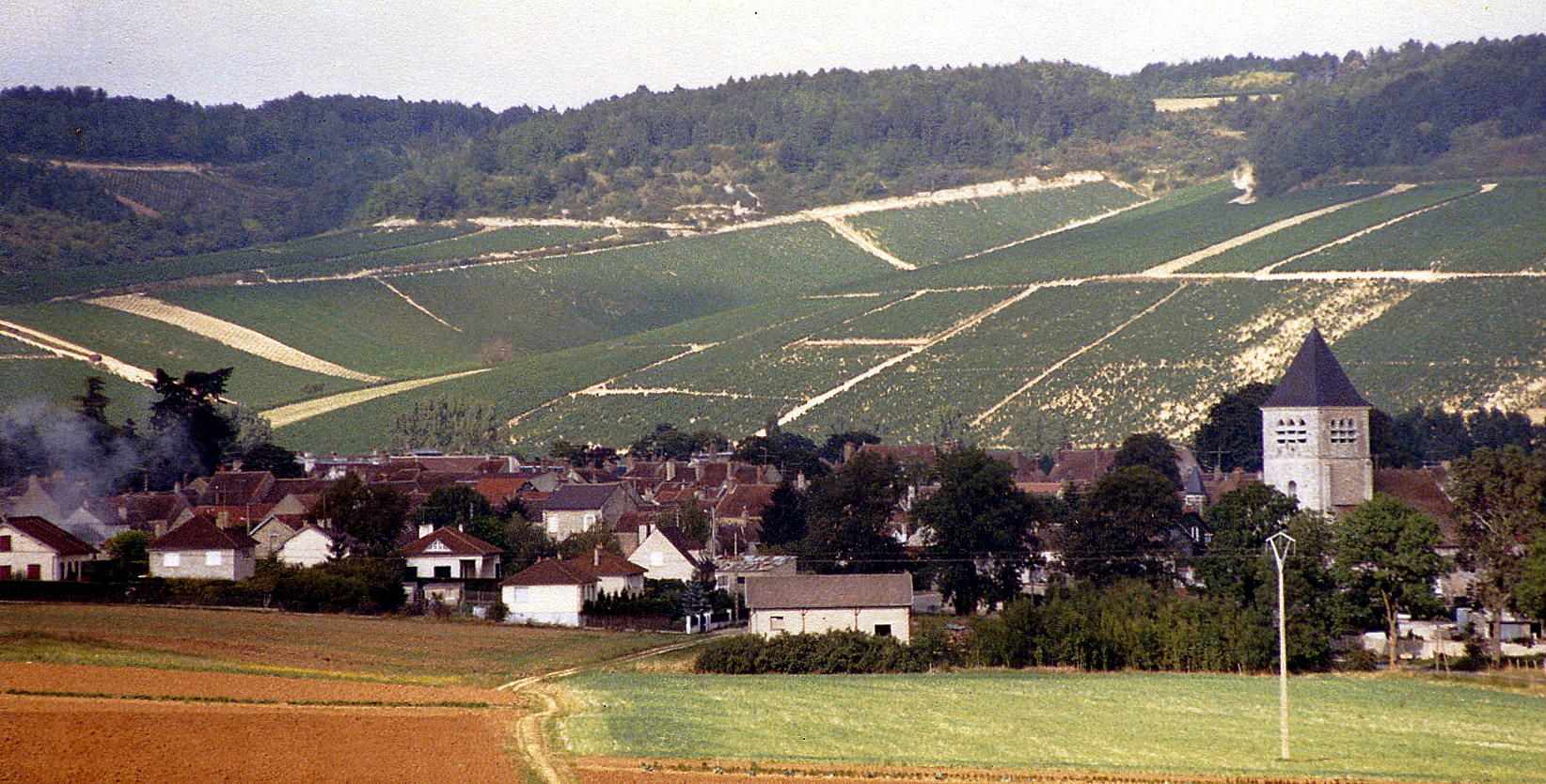
Champagne can only come from the Champagne region of France.

Champagne is produced at the far extreme of viticultural circumstances, where the grape struggles to ripen in a long drawn out growing season. Cool climate weather limits the varieties of grape, and the types of wine that can be made, but it is in this region that sparkling wine has found its standard bearer. The limestone–chalk soil produces grapes that have a certain balance of acidity, extract and richness that is difficult to replicate in other parts of the world. The Champenois vigorously defend use of the term "Champagne" to relate the specific wine produced in the Champagne wine region. This includes objection to the term "champagne style" to refer to sparkling wines produced outside the Champagne region. Since 1985, use of the term methode champenoise has been banned in all wines produced or sold in the European Union.

Blending is the hallmark of champagne wine, with most champagnes being the assembled product of several vineyards and vintages. In Champagne there are over 19,000 vineyard owners, only 5,000 of which are owned by champagne producers. The rest sell their grapes to the various champagne houses, négociants and co-operatives. The grapes, most commonly Chardonnay, Pinot noir and Pinot meunier, are used to make several base wines that are assembled together to make champagne. Each grape adds its own unique imprint to the result. Chardonnay is prized for its finesse and aging ability. Pinot noir adds body and fruit while Pinot meunier contributes substantially to the aroma, adding fruit and floral notes. The majority of champagnes produced are non-vintage (or rather, multi-vintage) blends. Vintage champagne, often a house's most prestigious and expensive wine, is also produced, but only in years when the producers feel that the grapes have the complexity and richness to warrant it.

=== Crémant ===
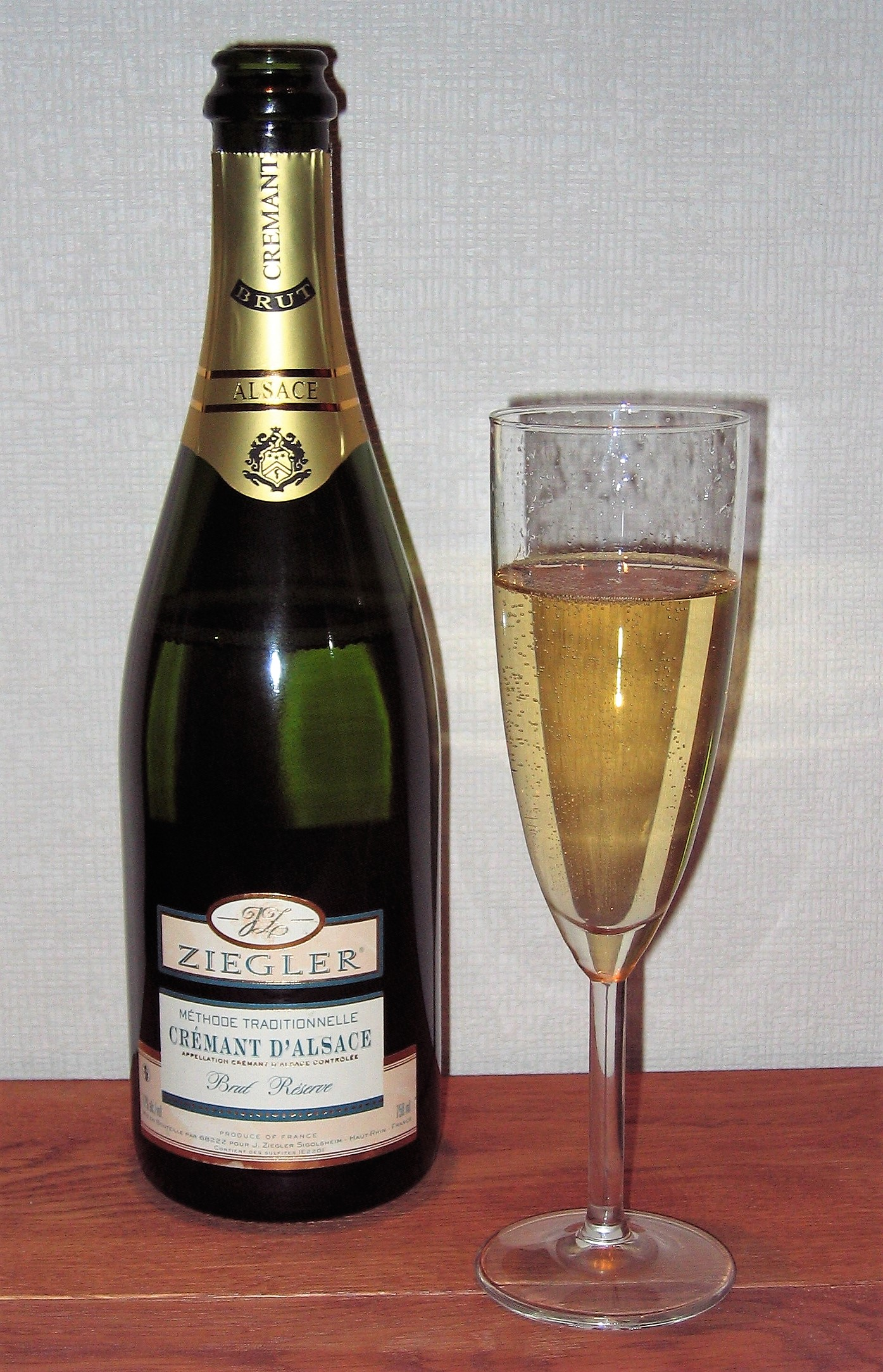
A Crémant d'Alsace

Sparkling wines designated crémant ("creamy") were originally named because their lower carbon dioxide pressures were thought to give them a creamy rather than fizzy mouth-feel. Though they may have full pressures today, they are still produced using the traditional method, and have to fulfill strict production criteria. In France, there are eight appellations for sparkling wine which include the designation crémant in their name:

- Crémant d'Alsace
- Crémant de Bordeaux
- Crémant de Bourgogne
- Crémant de Die
- Crémant du Jura
- Crémant de Limoux
- Crémant de Loire
- Crémant de Savoie

There are also crémant designations outside France:

- Crémant de Luxembourg
- Crémant de Wallonie (Belgium)
- Baden Crémant (Germany)

French appellation laws dictate that a crémant must be harvested by hand with yields not exceeding a set amount for their AOC. The wines must also be aged for a minimum of one year. The Loire Valley is France's largest producer of sparkling wines outside of the Champagne region. The majority of these Crémant de Loire are produced around the city of Saumur and are a blend of the Chardonnay, Chenin blanc and Cabernet franc. AOC laws do allow cuvées with Sauvignon blanc, Cabernet Sauvignon, Pinot noir, Gamay, Côt, Pineau d'aunis and Grolleau but those grapes are rarely used in a significant amount. In Burgundy, AOC laws require that Crémant de Bourgogne be composed of at least thirty percent Pinot noir, Chardonnay, Pinot blanc or Pinot gris. Aligoté is often used to fill out the remaining parts of the blend. The Languedoc wine Crémant de Limoux is produced in the forty one villages around the village of Limoux in the south of France. The wine is composed primarily of the indigenous grape Mauzac with some Chenin blanc and Chardonnay. The wine must spend a minimum of nine months aging on its lees. The sparkling Blanquette de Limoux is composed predominately of Mauzac and is aged for nine months.

As noted above, the designation crémant was previously used for sparkling wines from the Champagne region which were produced with slightly less carbon dioxide and somewhat lower bottle pressure (typically 2–3 atmospheres instead of 5–6). These wines were rare in comparison to regular, full-pressure champagne. The crémant designation was also used for sparkling wines from the Loire valley, in the form of Crémant de Saumur and Crémant de Vouvray, without being defined as separate appellations. In 1975, Crémant de Loire was given formal recognition as an AOC, and was followed by Crémant de Bourgogne (1975) and Crémant d'Alsace (1976). When in the late 1980s lobbying by champagne producers led to méthode champenoise being forbidden within the European Union as a designation for the traditional method, the term crémant was given its present definition. This meant that the use of "crémant" in the Champagne region was discontinued and additional French crémant AOCs were created from 1990, starting with Bordeaux and Limoux.

Since the designation crémant is not reserved exclusively for French use (as a result of it replacing méthode champenoise), it may also be used by producers in other EU countries which fulfill the production criteria. Although such usage is rare, for example in Luxembourg, Crémant de Luxembourg is a designation within the Moselle Luxembourgeoise appellation, rather than a separate appellation, but otherwise follows the same rules as French crémant.

Sula Vineyards produce "Sula Brut Crémant de Nashik" (up To 80% Chenin Blanc, the remainder Riesling and Viognier) and "Sula Brut Tropicale Crémant de Nashik" (60% Chenin Blanc, 40% Shiraz, Viognier) in India, which they differentiate from their "Méthode Classique" and "Méthode Traditionnelle" products.

=== Other French sparkling wine ===
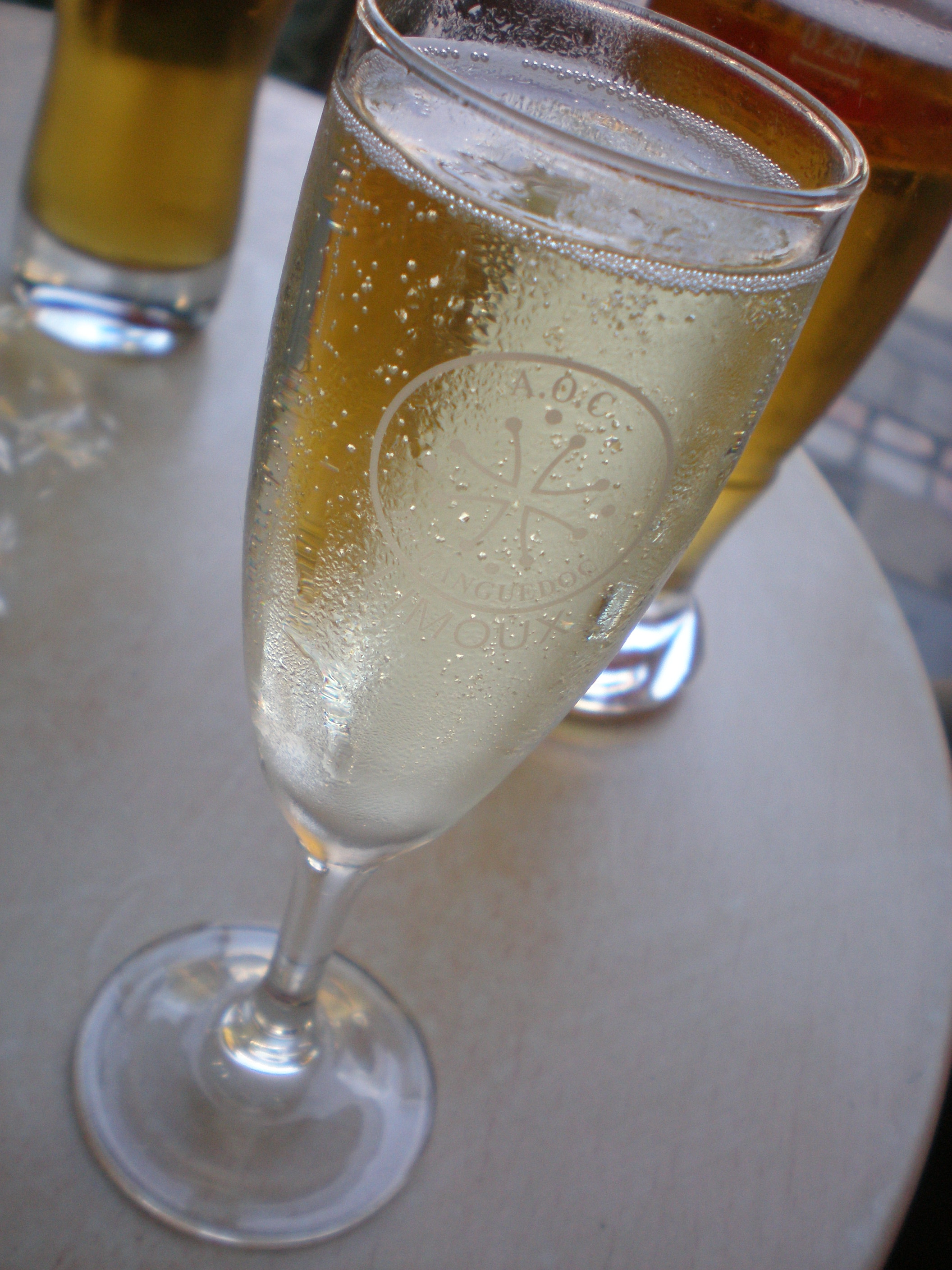
Blanquette de Limoux wine from the Languedoc region of France

There are also some other French appellations for sparkling wines, which do not carry the name crémant. Some of these are exclusively sparkling wine appellations, and some are appellations allowing both still and sparkling wine to be made. The term mousseux is French for "sparkling" and can refer to a sparkling wine made using methods other than the méthode champenoise such as the Charmat method, while Crémant can only be used for wines that have been made using the méthode champenoise.

Sparkling-only are:

- Anjou mousseux AOC
- Blanquette de Limoux AOC
- Blanquette méthode ancestrale AOC
- Bourgogne mousseux AOC
- Clairette de Die AOC
- Saumur mousseux AOC
- Touraine mousseux AOC

Either still or sparkling are:

- Gaillac AOC
- Saint-Péray AOC
- Vouvray AOC
- Montlouis AOC

== Other European sparkling wine ==
=== Cava ===
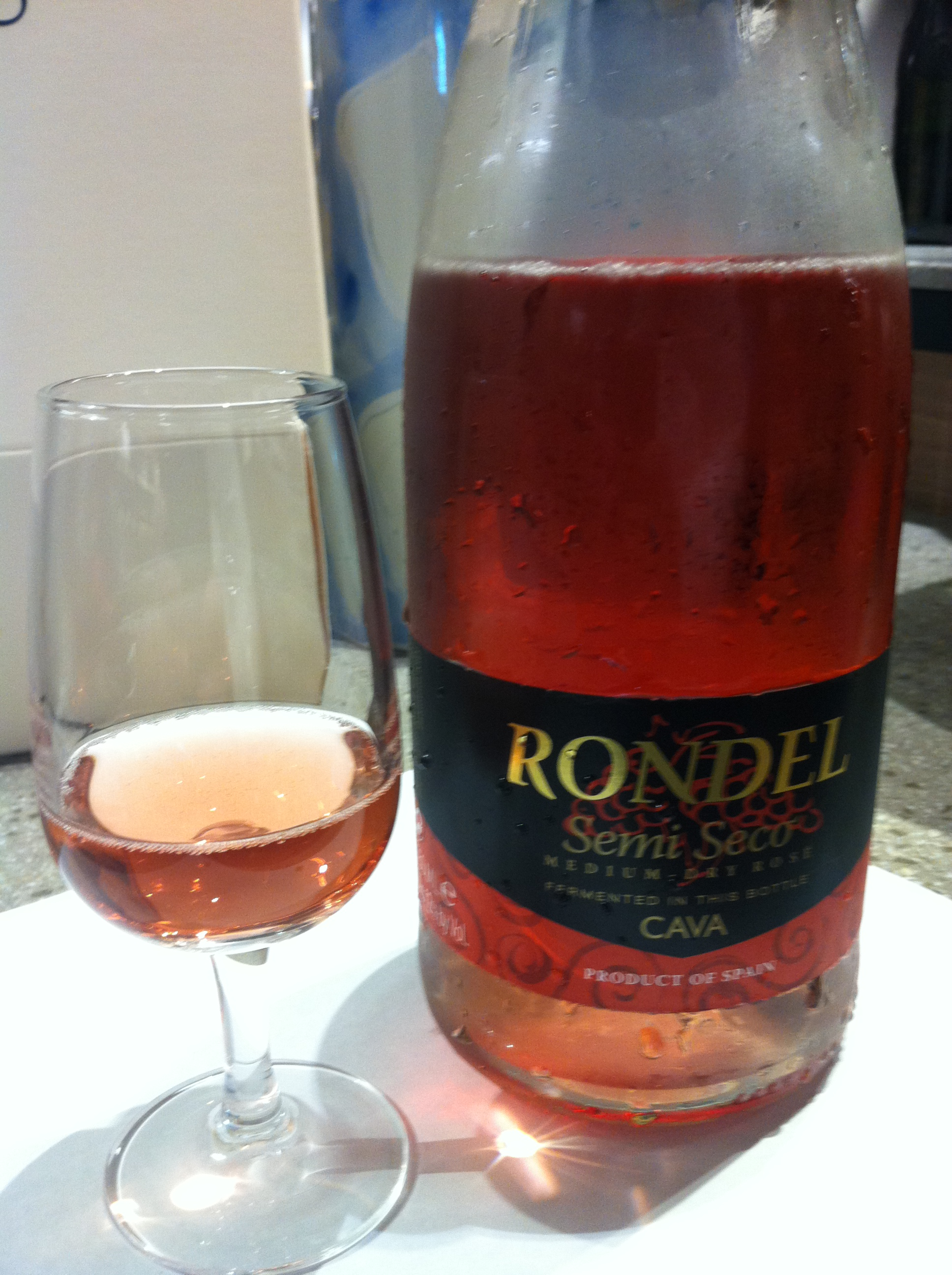
A semi-seco (semi-dry) rosado Cava

Cava is the name of a type of Spanish (mostly in Catalonia but also in other regions such as Valencia, La Rioja, Aragon, Extremadura) white or pink sparkling wine produced mainly in the Alt Penedès in Catalonia, 40 km to the south west of Barcelona, with the méthode champenoise but grape varieties different from grapes used in Champagne making. Cava is a Greek term that was used to refer to a "high end" table wine or wine cellar, and comes from the Latin word "cava" which means cave in English. Caves were used in the early days of Cava production for the preservation or aging of wine. Today Cavas have become integrated with Catalan and also Spanish family traditions and is often consumed at any kind of celebrations (baptism, marriages, banquets, dinners and parties). The sparkling wine of Cava was created in 1872 by Josep Raventós. The vineyards of Penedès were devastated by the phylloxera plague, and the predominantly red vines were being replaced by large numbers of vines producing white grapes. After seeing the success of the Champagne region, Raventós decided to create the dry sparkling wine that has become the reason for the region's continued success. In the past the wine was referred to as Spanish Champagne (no longer permitted under EU law), or colloquially as champaña in Spanish.

Cava is produced in varying levels of dryness of the wine which are: brut nature, brut (extra dry), seco (dry), semiseco (medium) and dulce (sweet). Under Spanish denominación de origen laws, Cava can be produced in six wine regions and must be made according to the Traditional Method with second fermentation in the bottle and uses a selection of the grapes Macabeu, Parellada, Xarel·lo, Chardonnay, Pinot noir, and Subirat. Despite being a traditional Champagne grape, Chardonnay was not used in the production of Cava until the 1980s.

=== Portuguese sparkling wine ===
Espumante (Portuguese pronunciation: [ɨʃpuˈmɐ̃tɨ]) is the Portuguese version of a sparkling wine. Unlike Cava, which is produced solely in northern climates, Espumante is not only produced in the northern wet region of Vinho Verde, but also throughout Portugal all the way to the southern region of the Alentejo, known for its extreme temperatures and arid climate.

While Spain has one regulating body, DOC Cava, spread across several different political regions, quality Espumante is produced solely in DOC Bairrada, located just south of Vinho Verde. In order for a wine to be certified as a quality Espumante from DOC Bairrada, it must be made in the traditional champagne (indicating the year of harvest) and stamped with the VEQPRD (Vinho Espumante de Qualidade Produzido em Região Determinada) certification.

VFQPRD is a regional sparkling wine made in the traditional champagne, charmat or transfer method in one of the following determined regions: Douro, Ribatejo, Minho, Alentejo or Estremadura.

VQPRD is a sparkling wine that can be made by injecting the wine with gas in the traditional champagne, charmat, transfer method anywhere in Portugal.

Espumoso is the cheapest and lowest level of sparkling wine, made by injecting the wine with CO_{2}.

Top-quality Espumantes can be found in Bairrada region and in Távora-Varosa sub region – Murganheira is an example of high-quality Espumante from this region.

=== Italian sparkling wine ===
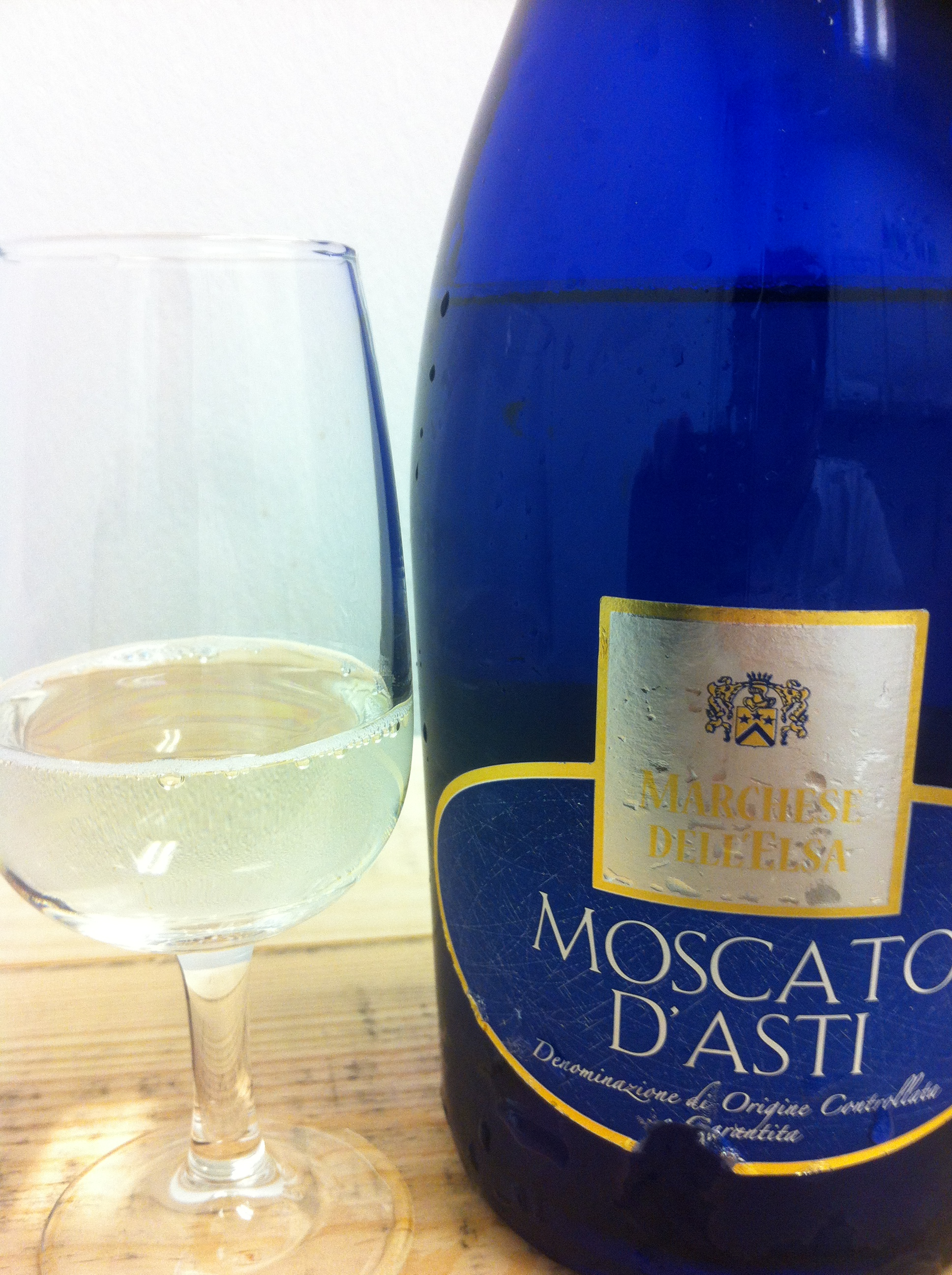
A lightly sparkling Moscato d'Asti

According to etymological sources, the term spumante was not used in a wine context until 1908, more than 40 years following the first Italian sparkling wine using the méthode champenoise produced by Carlo Gancia which was then sold as "Moscato Champagne".

Sparkling wines are made throughout Italy but the Italian sparkling wines most widely seen on the world market are the Prosecco from Veneto, Franciacorta from Lombardy, Asti from Piedmont and Lambrusco from Emilia. Though Franciacorta wines are made according to the traditional method, most Italian sparkling wines, in particular Asti and Prosecco, are made with the Charmat method.

Asti is a slightly sweet wine made from the Moscato grape in the province of Asti. The wine is noted for its low alcohol levels around 8% and fresh, grapey flavors. Moscato d'Asti is a frizzante style slightly sparkling version of Asti; it is sweeter and contains even less alcohol, typically around 5.5%.

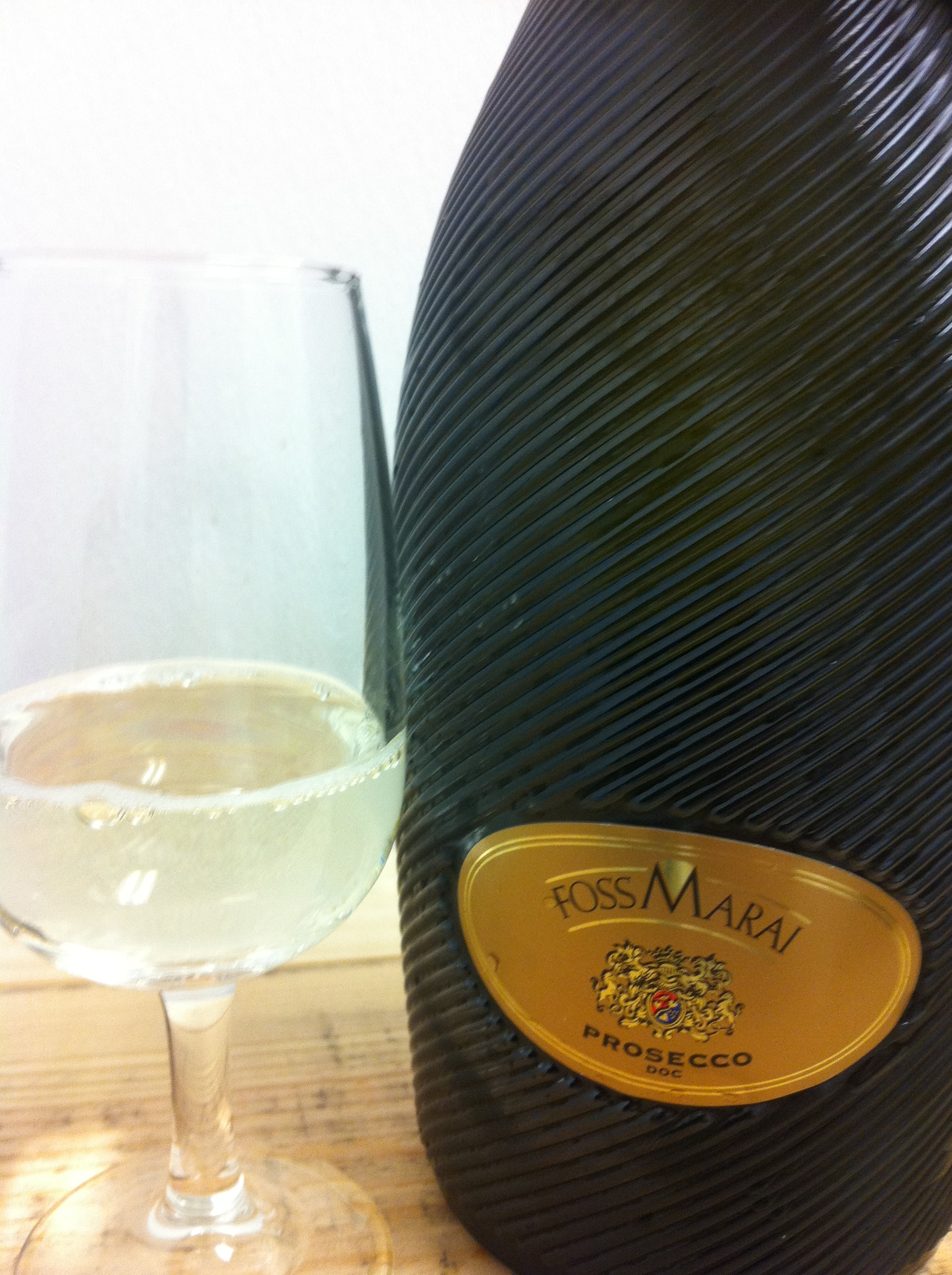
A Prosecco sparkling wine from Italy

The Franciacorta region, located northwest of Brescia, is home to the largest segment of Italian sparkling wine production. Made predominately from Chardonnay and Pinot bianco, sparkling wine labeled under the Franciacorta DOCG is permitted to include no more than 15% Pinot nero. Both vintage and non-vintage Franciacorta sparkling wines are made which require 30 and 18 months, respectively, of aging on the lees. Franciacorta Satèn, a Blanc de blancs, is produced with the reduced 4.5 atmospheres of pressure instead of 6 for an expression of softness.

Trento DOC is an appellation for white and rosé sparkling wines made according to the méthode traditionnelle. Chardonnay, Pinot noir, Pinot blanc and Pinot Meunier grapes are used. There is a maximum vine yield of 150 q.l. per hectare for all varietals, and a maximum grape yield of 70%. The wines must rest for a minimum of 15 months on their lees for non-vintage, 24 months for vintage, and 36 for riserva. Minimum alcohol content must be of 11.5%, or 12% for riserva. Trento DOC wines are distinguished by their straw-yellow color.

Prosecco is made in both fully sparkling (spumante) and lightly sparkling (frizzante) styles. The wine is produced in the cool hills around the town of Valdobbiadene and are generally dry but sweeter examples are produced.

v.f.q.p.r.d. (Vini frizzanti di qualità prodotti in regioni determinate): quality vini frizzanti made within defined regions are generally labeled as such.

=== Sekt ===
Sekt is a German term for certain sparkling wines. The majority of Sekt produced (around 95%) is made by the Charmat method with the remaining premium Sekt being made according to the méthode traditionnelle. Cheap sparkling wine made with CO_{2} injection must not be called Sekt, but rather Schaumwein (German for sparkling wine, literally "foam wine"), while semi-sparkling wine is called Perlwein. According to CJEU (Court of Justice of the European Union) regulation, Sekt and the Term „Qualitätsschaumwein“ (German for quality sparkling wine) are the same. Quality sparkling wine is defined by means of precise specifications, including at least 10 per cent alcohol content and 3 bars (44 psi) pressure in the bottle, among other things. For quality sparkling wines PSR (produced in specified regions), additional geographical regions (storage sparkling wine) and vintage specifications (vintage sparkling wine) are permitted. Around 90 percent of Sekt is made at least partially from imported wines from Italy, Spain and France. Sekt labeled as Deutscher Sekt is made exclusively from German grapes, and Sekt b.A. (bestimmter Anbaugebiete, in parallel to Qualitätswein b.A.) only from grapes from one of the 13 quality wine regions in Germany.

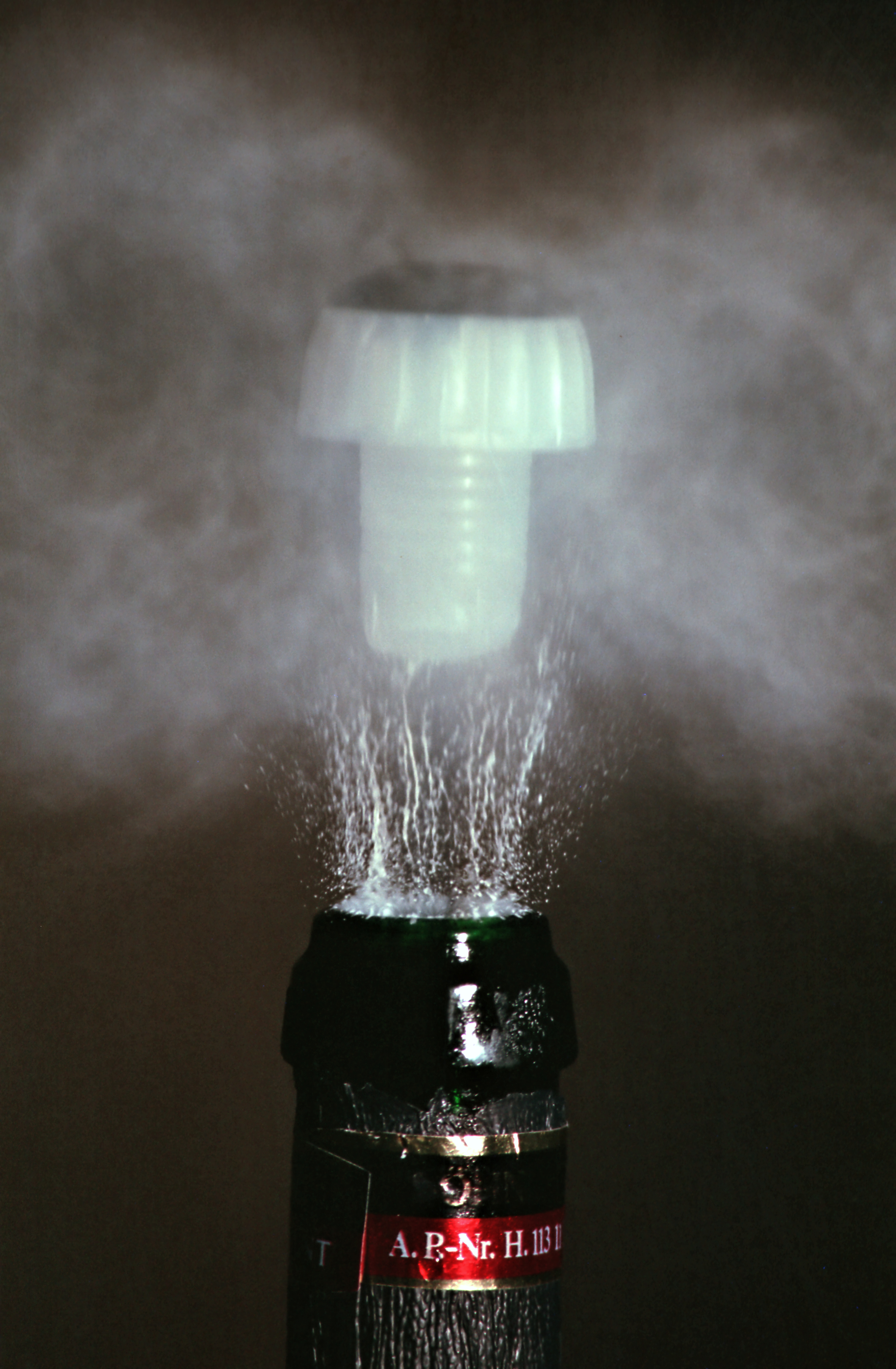
Opening a bottle of Sekt (high-speed photography). The sudden drop of pressure causes a huge drop of temperature. The moisture in the air freezes, creating a smoke of tiny ice crystals.

Some of the premium wines are often made using the Riesling, Pinot blanc, Pinot gris and Pinot noir grapes, with much of it drunk locally rather than exported. These Sekts are usually vintage dated with the village and vineyards that the grapes are from. Premium Sekt b.A. produced in smaller lots is often referred to as Winzersekt (winegrower's Sekt), since it is typically produced by a producer which has vineyards of his own, rather than by the large Sekt-producing companies (Sektkellereien) which buy grapes or base wine on a large scale for their production. In Austria, the corresponding term is Hauersekt.

German production of sparkling wines dates back to 1826, when G. C. Kessler & Co. was founded in Esslingen am Neckar by Georg Christian Kessler (1787–1842), who had previously worked at the Champagne house Veuve Clicquot from 1807 to 1826. The names used by the German producers for their sparkling wines in the 19th century were "Mousseux", "Sect" or "Champagne" (or Champagner), although "Sekt" already appears as a term and spelling in 1805 (see Weltsekttag) and from the late 18th century onwards begins to appear in technical manuals published for the use of wine merchants, vintners and oenophiles in general. The 1919 Treaty of Versailles forbade Germany the use of this name, long before European Union regulations prohibited its use outside the Champagne region. Sekt was initially an informal German name for sparkling wine, coined in Berlin 1825, but was in common use by the 1890s. Germany long attempted to have the name Sekt reserved for sparkling wine from countries with German as an official language, but these regulations were annulled by the European Court of Justice in 1975. Another legal decision in the 1970s abolished the large producers' monopoly on Sekt production, allowing winemaking cooperatives and individual winegrowers to produce and sell their own sparkling wines. Together, these two decision produced the situation of the name Sekt being possible to apply to sparkling wines of varying quality level.

Sekt typically comes with a muselet (safety cage) to hold the cork in place despite its considerable CO_{2} pressure. It also comes with a Schaumwein tax, which since 2005 has been €136 per hectolitre (€5.15/US gal; €6.18/imp gal), corresponding to €1.02 per 0.75-litre (25 US fl oz) bottle. This tax was famously introduced by Emperor Wilhelm II in 1902 to fund the expansion of the Imperial Navy.

Germans also call some similar foreign wines Sekt, like Krimsekt (often red) from Crimea.

In Austria, Sekt is often made in the méthode champenoise with the Welschriesling and Grüner Veltliner grapes giving the wine a golden hue color. Sparkling rosé are made from the Blaufränkisch grape. Austria's history of producing sparkling wine dates back to the Austro-Hungarian empire. Most Austrian Sekt producers are based in Vienna and source their grapes from the Weinviertel region in Lower Austria. Like its German counterpart, Austrian Sekt can be made trocken (dry) or halbtrocken (medium dry).

The first Austrian producer of sparkling wine was Robert Alwin Schlumberger, who presented his first sparkling wine in 1846 under the name Vöslauer weißer Schaumwein (White sparkling wine of Vöslau). It was produced from Blauer Portugieser grapes growing in vineyards in Bad Vöslau which Schlumberger bought in 1843, and the sparkling wine was an immediate success. Stuttgart-born Schlumberger had worked in the Champagne house Ruinart before he moved to Vienna in 1842.

The first facility to produce Sekt following the original French recipe was founded in 1825 in Pressburg (today Bratislava, Slovakia) by Johann Fischer and Michael Schönbauer, both local burghers. The company, later renamed Hubert J. E. after J. E. Hubert of the Hubert family, which bought the company from Johann Fischer in 1877, continues to produce Sekt in Slovakia today.

=== Pezsgő ===
The Hungarian equivalent for sparkling wine is pezsgő. The beginning of significant sparkling wine production in Hungary is dated back to the first half of the 19th century. The first wineries of sparkling wine were founded near Pozsony (today Bratislava, Slovakia) by Johann Fischer and Dr. Michael Schönbauer in 1825 (the first in Central-Europe) and Esch és Társa in 1835. A couple of decades later the main producers moved to the Buda Hills and Budafok nearby the capital creating a new center of production, the so-called "Hungarian Champagne" still existing nowadays. At the end of the 19th century the two most important wineries were József Törley és Társa moving from Reims, France to Budafok in 1882 and Louis és César-François founded in 1886. After the Soviet era the Hungarian wine sector was reborn. New and old wineries are seeking for the forgotten roots. Most of the Hungarian sparkling wines are made by the charmat and transvasée methods and a small but steadily growing amount by the traditional, champagneois method. The sorts of grape used during production can be international like Chardonnay, Pinot noir, Riesling, Muscat Ottonel, Muscat Lunel or natives like Olaszrizling, Kékfrankos, Furmint, Királyleányka, Hárslevelű, Kéknyelű and Juhfark.

=== Sovetskoye Shampanskoye ===
In the Soviet Union, sparkling wine was produced under the name Soviet Champagne, or Sovetskoye Shampanskoye. Most of this variety is sweet. This designation continued to be used for sparkling wine produced in several countries formerly part of the Soviet Union, including Georgia, Armenia, Belarus, Moldova, Russia and Ukraine. Most likely, the name has stuck since Sovetskoye Shampanskoye was one of the few products or brands of the Soviet era which were seen as luxurious. Often the names have been altered to fit the exact country, e.g. Georgian Champagne. Nowadays, it is more common to encounter Sovetskoye Shampanskoye produced in a dry or semi-dry style. The products have some international popularity, thus Russian made dry and semi-dry versions can be found in the European markets and Moldovan made semi-sweet version from Muscat grapes has been regularly available in the United States.

=== Romanian sparkling wine ===
In Romania, sparkling wine is mostly made in Panciu. The same traditional method is used in Azuga, where the mountain climate is perfect for the second fermentation of white and rose sparkling wines in passively cooled above-ground cellars. Grapes used (obviously not grown in this climate) are Chardonnay and a mix of Chardonnay and a Romanian variety called Fetească Regală. Rhein Azuga Cellars, now owned by Domeniile Alexandrion Rhein 1892, was established in 1892 and still uses the same methods and even tools from that era. In 2006, they have become once again official supplier to the Royal House of Romania, after having this honor between 1920 and 1947. Their Rhein Extra, still produced in the same building, was served at the coronation of King Ferdinand I at Alba Iulia in October 1922. Another well known producer of sparkling wine is Carastelec; their brand is called Carassia, they use traditional method and they make Blanc de Blanc Classic Brut, Rose Classic Brut (from Chardonnay, Pinot Noir & Meunier), a Classic Brut (from Chardonnay, Pinot Noir & Meunier) and Carassia Vintage 773 Brut. All their sparkling wines received numerous medals.

=== English sparkling wine ===
Commercial production of bottle fermented sparkling wines from grapes grown in England started in the 1960s, although there has been a longer history of sparkling wines made in the UK from imported grapes. In the 1980s, some English winemakers started to grow the grape varieties as used in Champagne – Chardonnay, Pinot noir and Pinot Meunier – and in the ensuing decades availability of English sparkling wines made from these varieties increased. Today, there are over 100 vineyards in England producing sparkling wines with Nyetimber, Ridgeview and Chapel Down being some of the largest producers. In 2010, Chardonnay and Pinot noir were the two most commonly planted grape varieties in English vineyards. Along with Pinot Meunier, the three varieties combined accounted for around 40% of vines planted, which appears to reflect a significant growth in interest in English sparkling wines. Other varietals used are Auxerrois, Seyval blanc, Müller-Thurgau, Reichensteiner, and Bacchus. To put that in context, the current yield for all types of English wine averages to around 2 million bottles annually.

=== Ukrainian sparkling wine ===
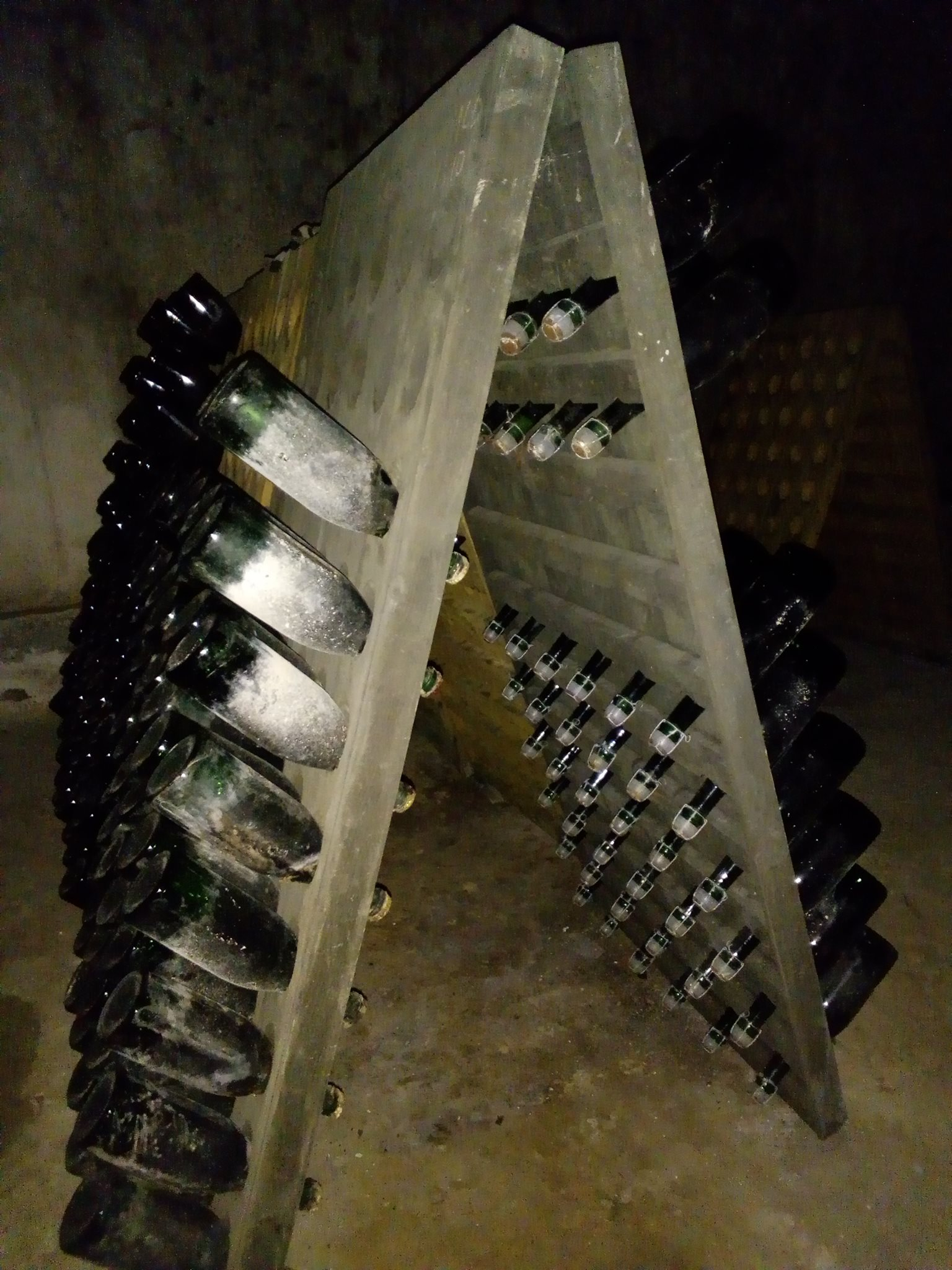
Sparkling wine in Christof Lacarin winery in Shabo

In Ukraine, sparkling wine (Ukrainian: ігристе вино, ihryste vyno) is mostly being produced in the south of the country, particularly in Bessarabia, Prychornomoria and Crimea. Those regions are located around the 46th parallel north, just as Champagne in France, which allows the production of the highest quality wine. Transcarpathia is also an important wine-making region in Ukraine. The varietal diversity of grapes in Ukraine is represented by the international and autochthonous varieties. The most renowned autochthonous variety is Telti Kuruk, cultivated on the Shabo terroir. The most widely planted selected variety is Odeskyi Chornyi (Alibernet) and Sukholymanskyi Bilyi, while Saperavi, Aligote, Rkatsiteli, Cabernet Sauvignon, Chardonnay, and Riesling are the most popular international varieties. One of the most popular Ukrainian sparkling wine manufacturers is Artwinery, which is the largest manufacturer in Eastern Europe of sparkling wines created according to the traditional (Champenoise) method. Another famous Ukrainian winery, Shabo, has a sparkling wine house near its terroir that covers a total area of 1.4 hectares and ensures quality at all stages of production.

== New World sparkling wine ==
=== American sparkling wine ===
Sparkling wines produced in the United States can be made in both the méthode traditionnelle and the charmat method. Lower cost sparkling wines, such as André, often employ the latter method with more premium sparkling wines utilizing the former. The history of producing quality sparkling wine in California can be traced to the Russian River Valley of Sonoma County where, in 1892, the Korbel brothers (emigrated from Bohemia in 1852) began producing sparkling wine according to the méthode champenoise. The first wines produced were made from Riesling, Muscatel, Traminer and Chasselas grapes. Partly aided by foreign influence, the overall quality of Californian sparkling wine increased with the introduction of the more traditional sparkling wine grapes of Chardonnay, Pinot noir, Pinot Meunier and Pinot blanc into production. US AVA requirements and wine laws do not regulate sugar levels and sweetness of wine though most producers tend to follow European standards with Brut wine having less than 1.5% sugar up to Doux having more than 5%. As the sparkling wine industry in California grew, foreign investments from some of the Champagne region's most noted champagne houses came to set up wineries in the area. These include Moët et Chandon's Domaine Chandon, Louis Roederer's Roederer Estate, and Taittinger's Domaine Carneros.

While many top American sparkling wine producers utilize the traditional methods of production, there are distinct differences in their wine making techniques that have a considerable effect on the taste of the wines. In Champagne, the cuvée blend will rarely have less than 30 wines and sometimes as many as 60 that are taken from grapes spanning 4–6 years of different vintages. In California, cuvees are typically derived from around 20 wines taken from 1 to 2 years worth of vintages. Champagne laws require that the wine spend a minimum of 15 months on the lees for non-vintage and minimum 3 years for vintage Champagne. It is not uncommon for a premium Champagne to age for 7 years or more prior to release. In the US, there are no minimum requirements, and aging length can vary from 8 months to 6 years. Another distinct difference for Californian sparkling wines is the favorable Californian climate which allows a vintage wine to be produced nearly every year.

Current US regulations ban the use of the term "champagne" on any wines not produced in Champagne except if the label was in use before 2006. No new labels including the term "champagne" will be approved by the US Government for wines produced outside of the Champagne region of France after 2006. Those "grandfathered labels" can only use the term on a wine label if there appears next to that name the appellation of "the actual place of origin".

The growth of the Finger Lakes wine industry in New York (state) and the success of Riesling wines from the region has resulted in an increasing number of producers making méthode champenoise sparkling wines from primarily or 100% Riesling. Finger Lakes producers such as Glenora and Casa Larga are also producing méthode champenoise sparkling wine from other grapes such as the traditional Chardonnay and Pinot noir.

=== Argentina ===
Argentina produces an estimated 10 to 12 million bottles of sparkling wine annually, with a growing share being exported to international markets. Although sparkling wine production began in the early 20th century, it has gained significant momentum in recent decades, especially in the high-altitude vineyards of Mendoza and the cooler regions of Patagonia. The majority of Argentina's sparkling wines are made using the Charmat method, though traditional method styles—particularly from Pinot Noir and Chardonnay—have seen increased investment and acclaim. A wide range of styles is produced, from dry extra brut to demi-sec, including blanc de blancs, blanc de noirs, and rosé. Notable producers such as Bodega Chandon (a Moët & Chandon subsidiary) have played a key role in establishing Argentina as a serious player in the sparkling wine category. In Patagonia, boutique wineries are crafting elegant and mineral-driven sparkling wines that reflect the region's cool climate. With rising domestic consumption and international recognition, Argentine espumantes are carving out a growing niche in the global sparkling wine market.

=== Canada ===
Canada's sparkling wine producers are found in Southern Ontario, British Columbia, Quebec and Nova Scotia, where growing conditions mirror that of Champagne, Provence and Languedoc of France. In particular, Ontario's appellations are emerging as strong producers of dry sparkling wines as their cooler climate conditions are very conducive to producing excellent, flavourful and not-too-ripe grapes.

While traditionally aimed at the domestic market, Canadian sparkling wines have recently gained prominence internationally. In 2011, L'Acadie Vineyards won a silver medal at an international competition for sparkling wines in France and in 2012, Benjamin Bridge winery's 2004 Brut Reserve placed higher than a Louis Roederer 2004 Cristal (wine) champagne at a blind tasting held with noted critics, bringing attention to the country's wine industry. In Ontario, wineries recognized for their sparkling wines include Henry of Pelham Winery, Jackson-Triggs and Inniskillin.

Ontario, and in particular the Niagara Peninsula, is the largest wine growing region in Canada. Approximately 26 of the Niagara Peninsula wineries produce some sparkling wine, where annual production averages about 55,000 cases (500,000 litres). Sparkling wine is largely produced in the Traditional Method (65%), and a smaller proportion is produced in the Charmat method (35%). The Niagara Peninsula region's micro-climate is well suited for the growth of Chardonnay, Riesling, Vidal Blanc, Pinot Noir and Gamay grapes, which are the prominent varietals for Ontario sparkling wine. Ontario sparkling wines are often noted for having a character and aroma comparable to that of traditional Champagne, including biscuit, subtle yeast and palate cleansing bubbles.

An emerging sparkling wine-focused region in Ontario is Prince Edward County, Ontario. The county is noted for its Prince Edward County Wine and is the fourth and newest Designated Viticultural Area (DVA) in the Province. Like the Niagara Peninsula, Prince Edward County's terroir and micro-climate are well suited for cool climate grapes where wineries, such as The Hinterland Wine Company, specialize in the production of sparkling wines.

Sparkling icewine in Ontario was first crafted by Canadian wine writer Konrad Ejbich in his home cellar in Toronto. Unique to Ontario and generally referred to as Icewine Dosage, this sparkling wine is produced by topping a Traditional Method dry sparkling wine with a dosage of Icewine, which is slightly off-dry with a hint of Icewine.

=== Australia ===
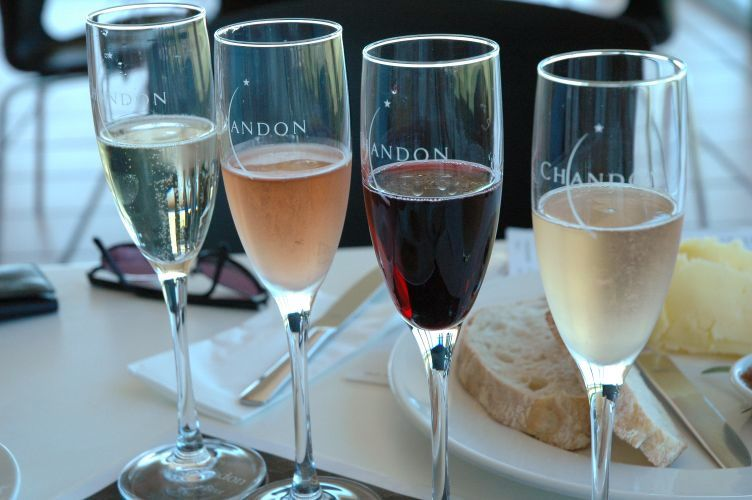
Australian sparkling wines from Domaine Chandon in the Yarra Valley

Australian sparkling wine production has come a long way in a very short period of time, according to Wine Australia's 2014–2015 annual report with several notable French Champagne houses investing in production.

Tasmania is a centre of Australian sparkling wine production. Wine commentator James Halliday states "the clear majority of the best sparkling wines are now solely sourced from Tasmania", and Tyson Stelzer says "Tasmania confidently holds its place as Australia's sparkling capital" with both the traditional grape varieties and method of secondary fermentation being employed.

Whilst most sparkling wine is produced from Chardonnay, Pinot noir and possibly Pinot Meuniere, an Australian speciality is sparkling Shiraz, a red sparkling wine produced from Shiraz grapes. Most sparkling Shiraz is traditionally somewhat sweet, but some producers make it dry, full-bodied and tannic.

=== Chile ===
Chile produces around 12 million bottles of sparkling wine per year of which only around 1.6 million bottles are exported to overseas markets. Although sparkling wines have been made since 1879, they have not yet established a significant place in Chile's wine portfolio. In recent years, the Pais grape variety has been creatively employed on its own or in blends, to make modern wines that have received favorable reviews. A rise in consumer demand and an ever-broadening selection of cool climate grapes has led to an increase in fresh and delightful sparkling wines ranging from bone dry extra brut to off-dry demi-secs, from blanc de blanc to blanc de noir to sparkling rosé. Valdivieso produce 60% of all sparkling wine in Chile. Most is inexpensive tank method fizz, but 20% is very good quality Champagne method from Pinot and Chardonnay. There is also a product made from a blend of sparkling Pinot wine and fresh handpicked strawberry pulp.

=== South Africa ===
Méthode Cap Classique or MCC is any sparkling wine made by the classic method of undergoing second fermentation in the bottle. There are quality standards that all producers adhere to voluntarily, apart from the minimum time on the lees (nine months) and the bars of pressure, which are mandatory in order to use MCC on the label. Traditional Champagne varieties such as Chardonnay and Pinot noir are mostly used for MCC production, however the use of other varieties are becoming increasingly popular and local MCC labels are seen with the likes of Sauvignon blanc and Chenin blanc. Sparkling wine is also made according to the Charmat method and red sparkling Pinotage can also be found. Methode Cap Classique tends to be very fruity due to the high temperatures of the South African Wine lands. The quality of MCC in South Africa can be compared to the wines produced in Champagne.

== See also ==
- Muselet
