= Törökbálint =

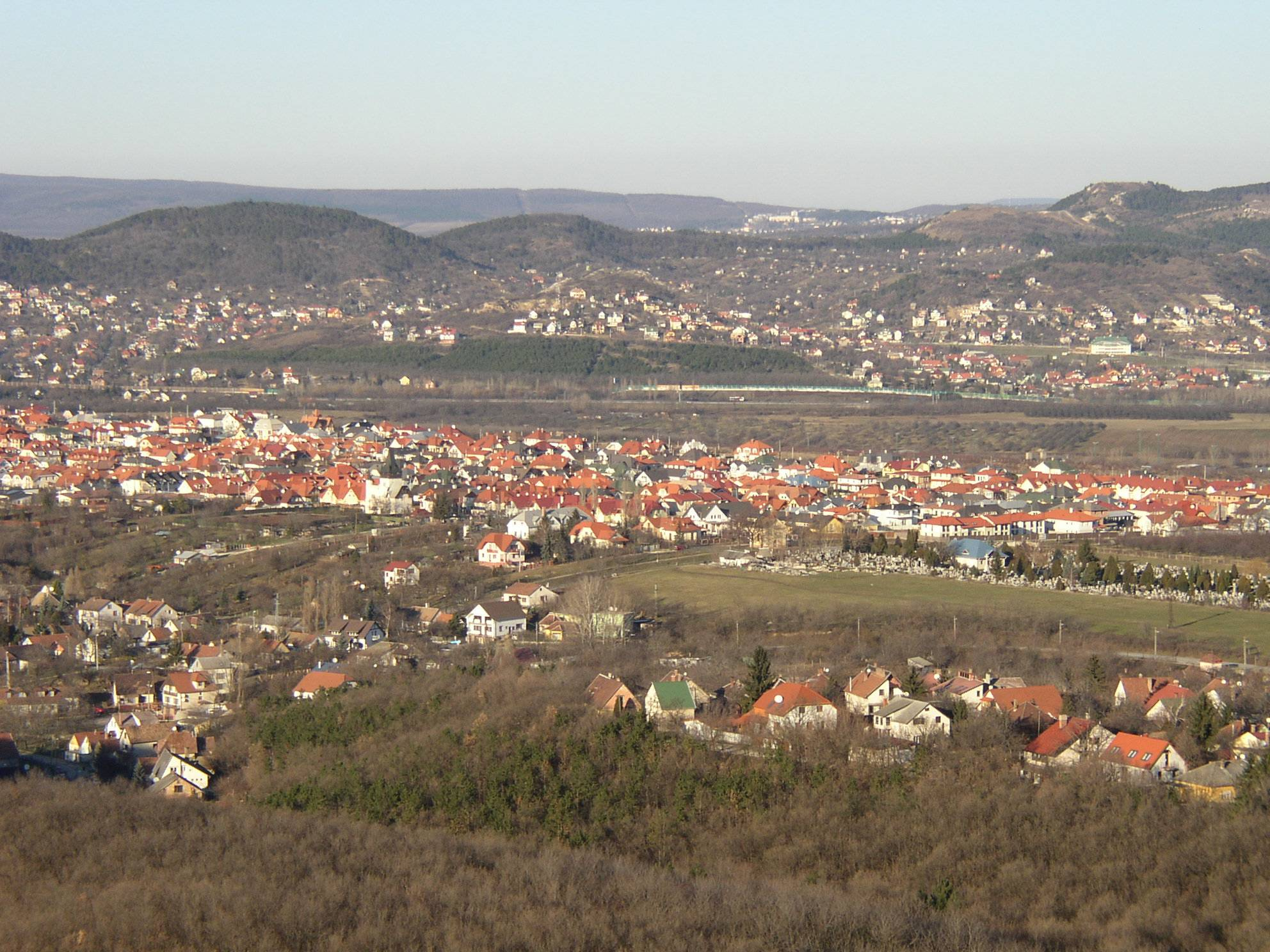
- Törökbálint

- Flag Coat of arms

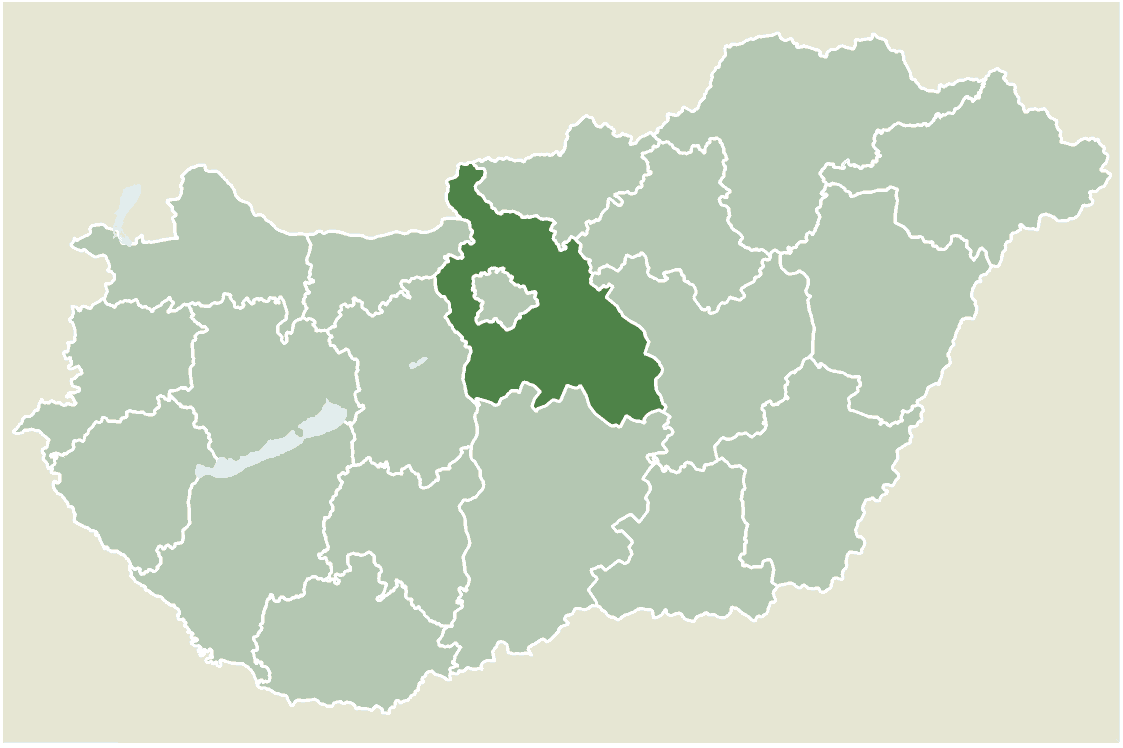
- Location of Pest county in Hungary

- Location of Törökbálint
- Coordinates: 47°26′12″N 18°54′44″E
- Country: Hungary
- County: Pest

Area
  - Total: 29.4 km^{2} (11.4 sq mi)

Population (2024)
  - Total: 14,517
  - Density: 455.27/km^{2} (1,179.1/sq mi)
- Time zone: UTC+1 (CET)
  - Summer (DST): UTC+2 (CEST)
- Postal code: 2045
- Area code: 23
- Motorways: M0, M1, M7
- Distance from Budapest: 16.2 km (10.1 mi) Northeast

Törökbálint [ˈtørøɡbaːlint] is a town in Pest county, Hungary. Törökbálint received town status on 1 July 2007.

The city also has a German name, Großturwall, which originates from the times of the Swabian immigration after the Ottoman times of Hungary.

== Geographic position ==
Törökbálint is c. 15 kilometres (9 miles) westwards from Budapest, between Diósd and Budakeszi, which were also Swabian settlements.

Törökbálint can be directly approached from the motorways M0, M1 and M7.

== History ==
=== Early history ===
Until the 1st century, the Avaric peoples were the inhabitants of Hungary, which the Romans chased away. Both nations left their footprint over the entirety of Hungary, and in Törökbálint as well, though the region was uninhabited until the 6th century, well after the Roman invasion. The Germanic tribes settled around this time.

After the Magyar settlement in the 9th century, the main leader of the Hungarians, Árpád, gave the lands around the present Törökbálint to prince Kond, whose son, Csörsz built the first castle in the area. Its name was Torbágy (Turobag), which is probably the ancient form of the present German name of the settlement.

Only in the early modern age, c. the 16th century, was the village renamed to Török-Bálint, with a Hungarian landlord and poet, Bálint Török (in Hungarian form Török Bálint) giving the name to it.

=== 16th to 19th centuries ===
In the 16th century, the lands around Törökbálint were given to the Jesuits, who built a number of buildings in Baroque style. They possessed the lands until 1773. By this time, the area was hardly inhabited, which was partly the result of the Turkish wars two hundred years before. In the 18th century, the first Danube Swabians began to arrive. The latter became the major population group in the area in a few decades.

After the order of the Jesuits was dissolved, Maria Theresa, the Kaiserin of Austria and Queen of Hungary gave the lands to Josef Majláth, her chamber counselor.

The first transportation contact with the capital, Budapest was established in 1884 with the opening of a railway.

=== Recent history ===
In 1900, the township obtained a new name. Instead of Török-Bálint, the name Törökbálint became official.

The next important step in the development of the settlement was the opening of the suburban railway, in 1912, which was, however, closed after World War I.

After World War II, the Danube Swabians, who had been living there for hundreds of years, were expelled from Hungary.

Nowadays, Törökbálint is part of the suburban Budapest. The township is growing in population, migrants often coming for a "peaceful atmosphere." Tükörhegy (mirror hill or Spiegelberg in German), an area in the outskirts of Törökbálint, a former orchard, has been, for instance, almost fully built in.

In the outskirts of Törökbálint, multinational companies, like Cora and Telenor give work for many inhabitants of the settlement.

== Twin towns – sister cities ==
Törökbálint is twinned with:

- Bük, Hungary
- Odorheiu Secuiesc, Romania
- Soroksár (Budapest), Hungary
- Süßen, Germany
- Veľké Trakany, Slovakia

== Main sights ==
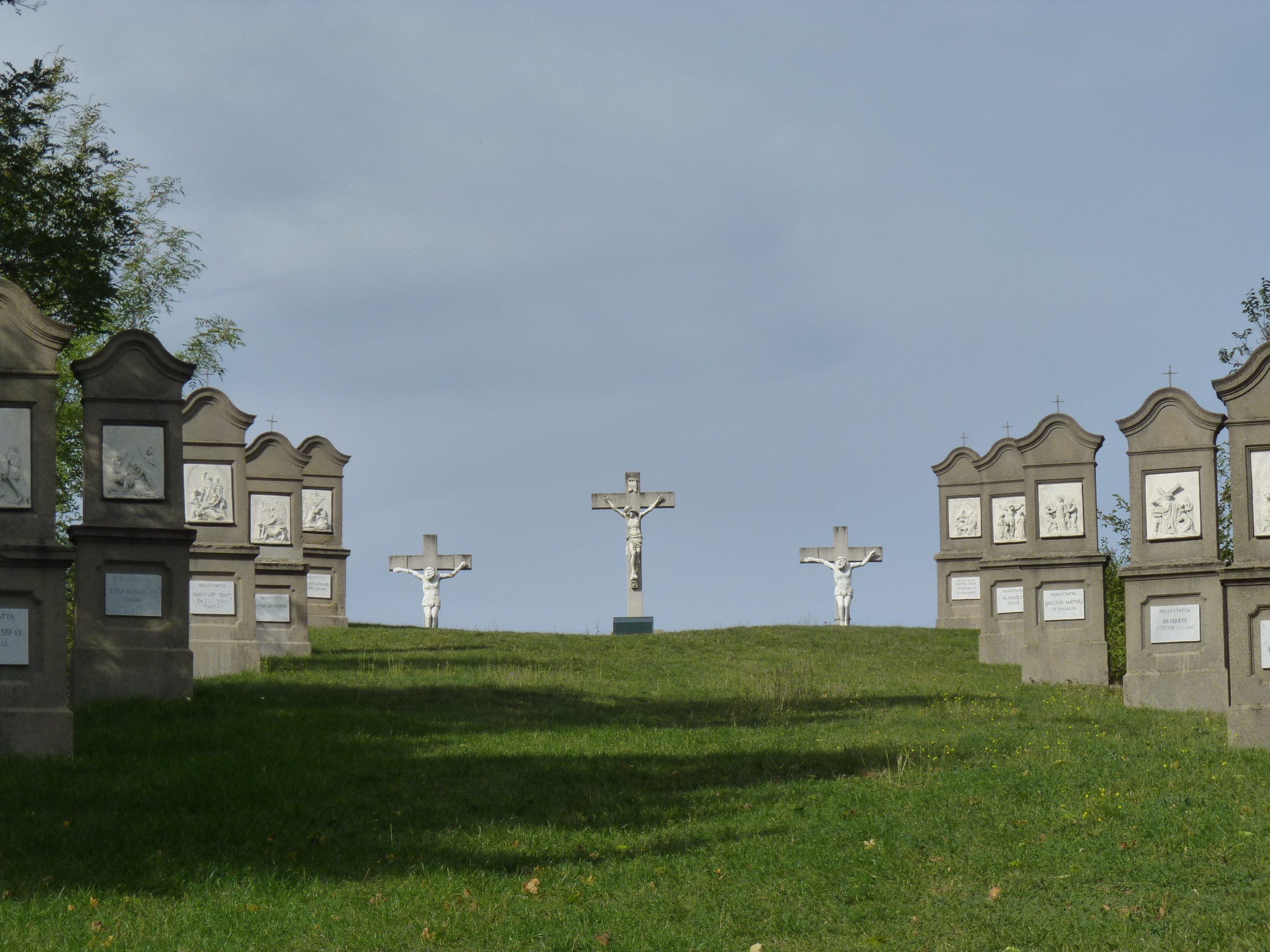
The Calvary

- Walla castle
- Lung sanatorium, which was the former castle of the Jesuits
- Calvary-row
- The Roman Catholic Church, which was first mentioned in 1422
- The historic building of the Ignác Zimándy School
- The Calvinistic Church, which was built 1994 in partnership with the German town of Süßen
- Village Museum

== Notable residents ==
- Imre Menyhay, Hungarian-Austrian economist
- György Pásztor, Ice hockey player, Order of Merit of the Republic of Hungary
- Zoltán Takács, Hungarian musician

== See also ==
- Klein-Turwall
