= Törley =

Sparkling wine producer

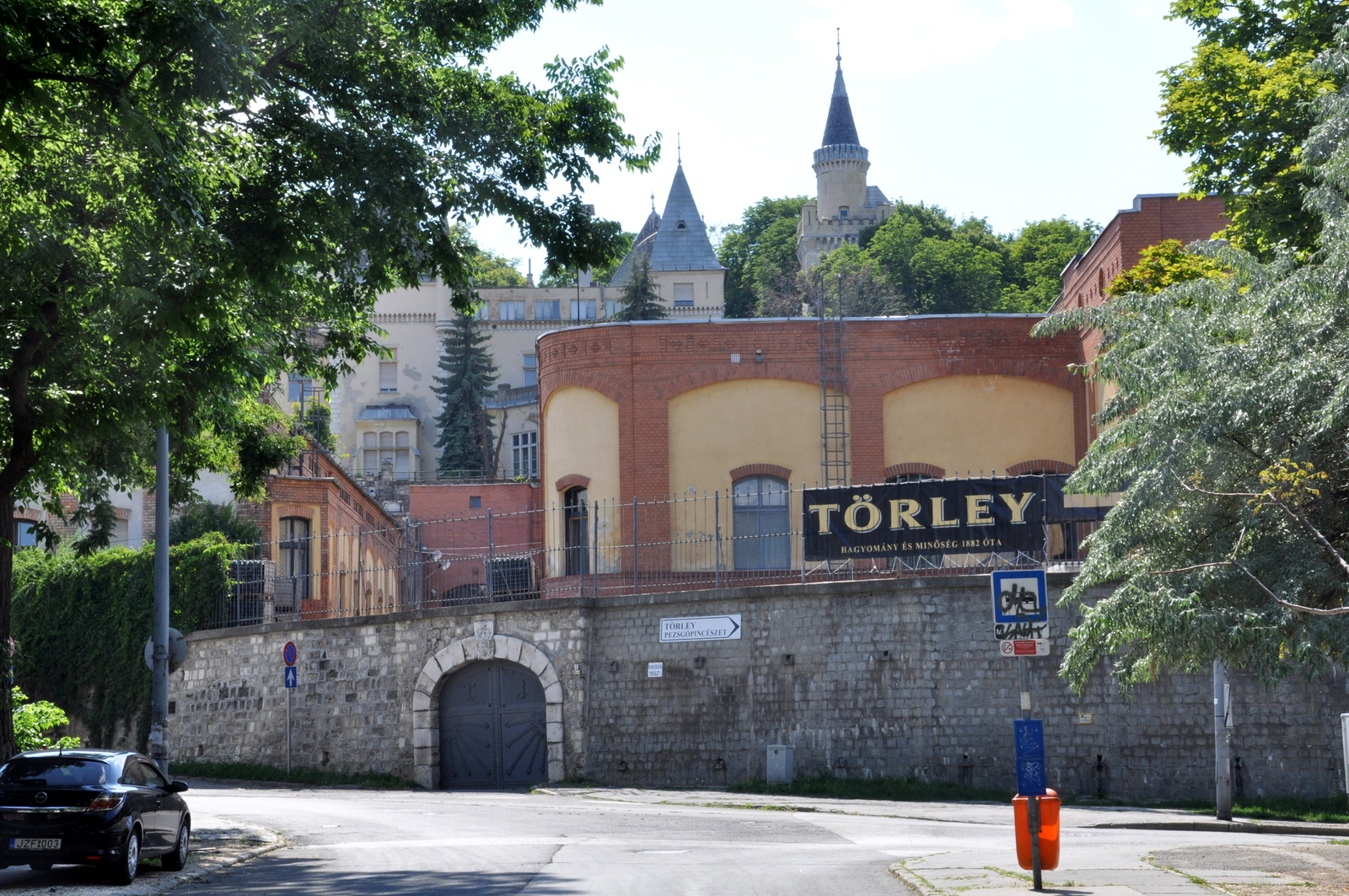
- Industry: sparkling wine
- Founded: 1882
- Founder: József Törley
- Headquarters: Budafok, Hungary; 47°25′52″N 19°02′08″E

Törley is the leading sparkling wine producer in Hungary. It was founded by József Törley in 1882 in Budafok and over the course of the following years became one of the leading sparkling wine producers in Europe.

== History ==
József Törley had no children, so the factory was inherited by his brothers and their sons. Under the management of these heirs, the factory continued to flourish.

By 1910, there was significant competition from other sparkling wine producers in Hungary. Budafok alone had 18 different producers operating, but the Törley plant still had the greatest market share in Hungary. The winery's output reached 2 million bottles and Törley had become one of the leading brands of sparkling wine in Europe.

After World War I ended and the Trianon Peace Treaty was signed, the level of sparkling wine production by the Törley plant significantly decreased and touched bottom during the Great Depression. In 1929-30, the annual production barely reached 200,000 bottles. In the 1930s, the demand for sparkling wine increased again and during the Second World War production again reached 1 million bottles annually. During the wartime boom, the demand became far greater than the quantity which could be produced by the existing technology. Likewise, the war made it difficult to estimate what demand would be in three years time – the gestation period of the Törley sparkling wine. Despite the demand that the war had created, the hostilities quickly reversed the Törley plant’s fortune when a bomb destroyed the main building and the majority of the factory’s stocks in July 1944.

== Post World War II era ==
After World War II ended, Communism took control of Hungary and the winery was subsequently nationalized in 1949. Under nationalization, the government merged the François brothers' winery into Törley's. The resulting Törley winery shrank to only four employees and the scope of the business was limited to selling what wine remained in stock. Production resumed in 1951 with Törley becoming the only sparkling wine factory in Hungary and operating under the supervision of the Unicum Likőrgyár (the Unicum Liqueur Factory). The constantly increasing demand and the export possibilities encouraged the factory to develop an annual capacity of 30 million bottles by the end of the 1980s through continuous expansion and purchasing production lines of the latest technology. Today, the Törley factory produces some 12 to 14 million bottles each year and has close to a 50% domestic market share in Hungary. In the 21st century, Törley has developed a popular following in Asian countries. Törley currently produces sparkling wine using both the méthode traditionelle of in-bottle fermentation and the Charmat process which uses large vats for the second fermentation. On October 29, 2004, The Wall Street Journal's wine critics rated Törley's Grand Cuvee the second best sparkling wine in the world.

The world’s first champagne order, the Chevaliers Torley, was established at the Törley factory in 1987. Members are accepted into the order after an initiation procedure known by its French name “dégorgement.” Part of initiation requires members to remove sediment in the neck of a bottle according to a method devised by Törley himself.

Hungarian State Wine-cellars appropriated the champagne factory in 1955, predecessor of today’s Hungária, which took over Törley champagne factory from Unicum. In 1987, Hungarovin became owner of Törley. Since 1992, Henkell & Söhnlein Hungaria Kft, a subsidiary of Henkell & Söhnlein Sektkellerei AG of Wiesbaden, Germany has owned and produced the Törley brand.
