= József Törley =

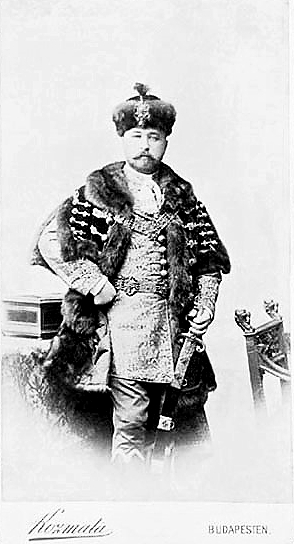
- József Törley in the late 19th century
- Born: 10 January 1858; Csantavér, Hungary, Austrian Empire
- Died: 28 July 1907 (aged 49); Ostend, Belgium
- Citizenship: Hungarian
- Education: University of Graz, Graz
- Occupation: CEO (Törley)
- Known for: Holdings in Törley
- Spouse: Irén Sacelláry de Székas

József Törley (10 January 1858 – 28 July 1907) is credited as having established one of the most successful brands of sparkling wine outside of the Champagne region in the late 19th and early 20th centuries.

In the 19th century, production of Champagne-style sparkling wines became popular in Europe and rapidly spread across the continent. J. E. Hubert established the first Hungarian sparkling wine factory in Pozsony, Hungary (today Bratislava, Slovakia), in 1825, and by 1876, Littke was producing sparkling wine in Pécs. In 1882, a new sparkling-wine producing center emerged in Budafok, Hungary, under the name of József Törley and Co.

== Biography ==
József Törley was born in Csantavér, Austrian Empire. While studying at the Academy of Trade in Graz, Austria-Hungary, Törley met Theophilus Roederer (1843–1888). Roederer invited Törley to Reims, France to learn the production of champagne. In the 1870s Törley apprenticed in Reims; at first for the Roederer plant and later for Delbeck and as a result, he became very knowledgeable about Sparkling wine production. In Reims, Törley set up his own champagne factory and began to bottle. He would buy base wine from local French producers and then proceed to turn the base wine into champagne.

Upon one of his base wine acquisition trips to Budafok, Austria-Hungary, Törley realized that the conditions there were perfect for the production of sparkling wine. Törley determined that the soils of Budafok, more closely than anywhere else in Europe, resembled the chalky limestone soil extant in the Champagne region of France which was necessary for producing the characteristics in the base wine of champagne. In 1882, Törley moved his factory from Reims to Budafok and proceeded to replicate every aspect of the champagne production he had learned in France, including the methods used to grow grapes at his vineyards in Etyek, Hungary. Törley also had 45 miles worth of cellars carved out of Budafok's limestone hills to ensure the uniform temperature required for maintaining the quality of the wine throughout production. Törley's quarried limestone went into the construction of Hungary's Parliament which, upon completion in 1904, was the largest building on earth.

Törley was apparently successful from the start. In 1882, after the first production of champagne in Hungary, he wrote, "With great diligence and persistence I succeeded in producing something far superior to the Champagne sparkling wines known so far." Törley continuously developed his winery and the production technology, and introduced refrigerative disgorging in Hungary.

In producing champagne, Törley did not work alone; rather he employed French experts who installed the winery as well as worked it throughout production, taking instructions from Törley himself as to the details of production. Louis François, who had come from Reims to Hungary at Törley's invitation, worked as Törley's cellar master until he set up his own winery in Hungary with his brother César François in 1886, after Louis had a falling out with Törley.

In addition to having produced a high quality crémant (called pezsgő in Hungarian) and remaining innovative, Törley also had keen insight into the marketing of the beverage. With his great emphasis on marketing and advertising, by around the start of the 20th century, Törley's plant was one of the most modern wine producing facilities in the world. By the time of the World Expo held in Budapest in 1896, the Törley cellars had been granted the title of "suppliers to the imperial and royal court" since Törley was supplying the Habsburgs with his sparkling wine. Törley himself was granted the title of nobility by Franz Joseph, Emperor of the Austro-Hungarian Monarchy. On New Year's Eve 1899 Törley commented, "They will also be welcoming in the next turn of the century with my champagne."

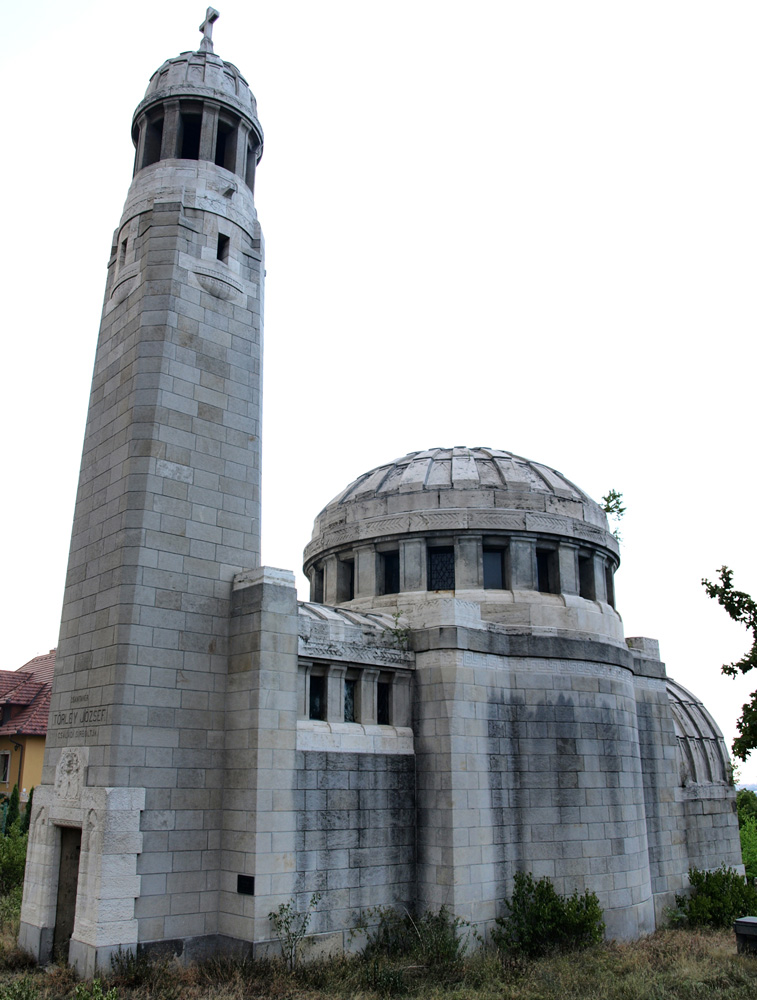
Törley had a large mausoleum built for himself in Budafok

By the beginning of the 20th century, Törley had expanded distribution throughout the world, and ironically, his sparkling wine had become quite popular in Paris, France. By 1905, production reached 1 million bottles. As the business grew, Törley built a huge mansion above the factory. The two buildings were linked by a secret tunnel allowing Törley, much like Henry Ford would do, to make a sudden, unannounced appearance at any time in the factory. The progressive industrialist Törley was also the first to buy trucks in Hungary for the transportation of goods, and was the founding member of the Royal Hungarian Automobile Club.

In 1907 the winery celebrated its 25th anniversary and Törley's sparkling wines were known from America to Australia. The firm now had warehouses in Hamburg, Berlin and Copenhagen. Törley himself did not long outlive the 25th anniversary of the factory as in the summer of 1907, he died in Ostend, Belgium. Törley, a Roman Catholic, left instructions for his body to be buried in Budafok. As Törley had no children, the factory was inherited by his brothers and their sons. Under the management of these heirs, the factory continued to flourish.

By 1910, there was competition from other champagne producers in Hungary. Budafok alone had 18 different producer operating, but the Törley plant still had the greatest market share in Hungary. The winery's output reached 2 million bottles and Törley had become one of the leading brands of sparkling wine in Europe.

After World War I ended and the Trianon Peace Treaty was signed, the level of champagne production by the Törley plant significantly decreased and touched bottom during the Great Depression. In 1929–30, the annual production barely reached 200,000 bottles. In the 1930s, the demand for sparkling wine increased again and during World War II production again reached 1 million bottles annually. During the wartime boom, the demand became far greater than the quantity which could be produced by the existing technology. Likewise, the war made it was difficult to estimate what demand would be in three years' time – the gestation period of the Törley champagne. Despite the demand that the war had created, the hostilities quickly reversed the Törley plant's fortune when a bomb destroyed the main building and the majority of the factory's stocks in July 1944.

After World War II ended, Communism took control of Hungary and the winery shrank to only four employees and the scope of the business was limited to selling what wine remained in stock. In 1949, the factory was nationalized and production resumed in 1951 with Törley becoming the only champagne factory in Hungary and operating under the supervision of the Unicum Likõrgyár (the Unicum Liqueur Factory). The constantly increasing demand and the export possibilities encouraged the factory to develop an annual capacity of 30 million bottles by the end of the 1980s through continuous expansion and purchasing production lines of the latest technology. Today, the Törley factory produces some 12 to 14 million bottles each year and has close to a 50% domestic market share in Hungary. In the 21st century, Törley has developed a popular following in Asian countries.

The world's first champagne order, the Chevaliers Torley was established at the Törley factory in 1987. Members are accepted into the order after an initiation procedure known by its French name "dégorgement". Part of initiation requires members to remove sediment in the neck of a bottle according to a method devised by Törley himself.

Hungarian State Wine-cellars appropriated the champagne factory in 1955, predecessor of today's Hungária, which took over Törley champagne factory from Unicum. In 1987, Hungarovin became owner of Törley. Since 1992, Henkell & Söhnlein Hungaria Kft, a subsidiary of Henkell & Söhnlein Sektkellerei AG of Wiesbaden, Germany has owned and produced the Törley brand.
