= Imre Menyhay =

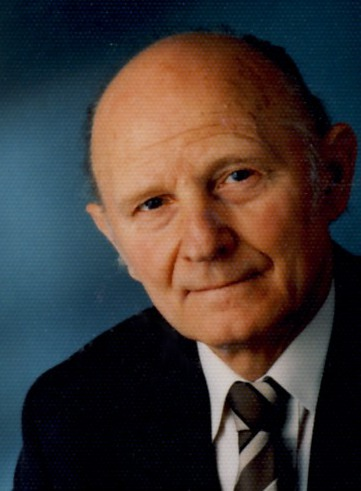
- Imre Menyhay in 1985
- Born: May 12, 1931; Budafok, Hungary
- Died: October 23, 2018 (aged 87); Styria, Austria.
- Spouse: Ilona Murányi (1996–2018)
- Children: Melanie (1998); Stefan (2004)

Imre (Emmerich) Menyhay (12 May 1931, in Budafok – 23 October 2018) was a Hungarian-Austrian economist, pedagogue, sociologist, and psychologist of economics. His fields of research are pedagogy, economic psychology, and economic sociology development. His key works are Management, Business, Ethics - Social Theory and Background by the Application of Economic Sociology, dealing with social theoretical economic sociology, and Homo Oeconomicus And Unfinished Creation - The Analytical Background by Economic Psychology and Its Application, dealing with psychoanalytical economic psychology.

== His family ==
With his wife Ilona Murányi he has two children: Melanie és Stefan.

== Studies and scientific degrees ==
He graduated from the Civic School of Budafok with an excellent grade and the Márvány Street Economic High-School of Budapest with a superior grade. In the latter one, he studied under the Kossuth Prize winning writer, Miklós Szentkuthy, who befriended this pupil who excelled in Hungarian literature and held school celebration speeches. The bonds of this friendship tied them together until the writer's death.

He completed his studies at the Corvinus University at the then Karl Marx University of Economics, Faculty of Pedagogy in Budapest with a pre-degree certificate, later acquiring a doctoral degree in pedagogy with summa cum laude. On 6 November 1956, due to his journalistic activity, he had to flee to Austria.

In Vienna, after preliminary studies at the Institute for International Economic Studies, he acquired a teacher's degree in economics and a Master's title before the Austrian State Examination Committee. Afterwards, he pursued studies at the Faculty of Social and Economic Sciences of the University of Graz, where he obtained a master's degree in business economics, then a Doctor of Science (PhD) degree in sociology. He obtained the Doctor Habilitatus degree with a hundred-per cent qualification.

== Young years ==
As a student, he earned his living from his teachers’ support, scholarships, and work. He worked as an unskilled worker in the Hutera Brick Factory in Törökbálint, as a payroll clerk in the Tool and Machine Factory of Budapest, and as a cashier paying wins at the Horse Racing Track. On assignment by the TIT (Scientific Educational Society), he held lectures in plants in Budapest and its surroundings. He returned to this historic Society half a century later, publishing several studies in the Society's journal called Valóság (Reality).

During the late 1940s and early 1950s, he acted as the leader of the 1915 Astrik the Blessed Scout Team and clerk of the youth organization of the Catholic vicarage of Budafok Fourth District. He attended the demonstrations in support of Cardinal Mindszenty. He was monitored by the State Security Authority.

During the school-year 1955/56, he taught in the Sopron High-School of Economics, and benefiting from the support of the local council, he established the technical conditions and licensing for relaunching the Soproni Napló (Sopron Journal). At that time, the press was controlled by the Communist Party. The Győr Party Committee excluded him from the editorial committee of the newspaper. He was included after the onset of the revolution. Because of this activity, he and the students and professors of the University of Sopron were forced to flee in 1956. He returned to Sopron – to the university – forty years later in 1996, from the Budapest University of Economic Sciences where he taught since 1991.

== Years of immigration 1956 – 1991 ==
In November 1956, children of refugee families ran about like rootless in the bombed barrack courtyard of Traiskirchen township in Lower Austria, a place provided hastily by the Austrian government for Hungarian refugees. Here he spoke to the administrator of the refugee camp, pointing out that the lack of regular activities caused children to be vulnerable. He requested an appointment with a competent person in this case. The next day the then Austrian minister of education, Heinrich Drimmel, sent an office car for him, and assigned him to set up a school for the Hungarian refugee children. He obtained parental consent to place the children under the care of the school to be set up, prepared the organization plan, the curriculum by disciplines, the schedule, and the list of teachers. A teacher of religion was found only in the last minute, right before the buses full of children and educators left the barrack courtyard heading to Obertraun in Upper Austria. There, before the assembly of students and teachers, the minister's aide assigned him to manage the school, which was a short assignment. The priest teaching divinity thought that a pedagogue schooled at the Marx Károly University of Economic Sciences wasn't fit as a pedagogue, took over the school management, gave him 500 schillings, and placed him on a train to Vienna.

In 1957, after many adversities, he arrived in the old castle of the Schwechat Beer Factory near Vienna, adapted for intellectual refugees, where he spent five years. He studied with a Rockefeller scholarship for a year, then obtained a Kéthly Anna scholarship; during this time, he also worked as an entrepreneur, trying to obtain the minimum two years of practice necessary to obtain the professor of economics certificate according to the Austrian higher educational requirements in force at that time.

With his own hands, he restored an abandoned old house on the Old Danube in Vienna (Elidagasse 10), where in 1962 he moved in. He lived there only for a short time, because after the successful teacher's certificate examination, he applied and won the position of the professor of economics of the Austrian federal government in the economics school of the Styrian town of Leoben, whereby the government intended to support the town school ("live subvention"). He was elected first representative of the faculty, then appointed school director in 1976. He filled this position until 1991.

At the late 1980s, the Communist regime was heading to its fall. Hungary needed support, especially in the social and economic sciences. He tried to help by setting up the reception of academic tours for the interested Hungarian delegations in Austria. On the Hungarian side, the academic tours were organized by the Komunitas Enterprise and its director, Zoltán Pálfalvy. The academic tours benefited from support through the collaboration of staff from Leoben. They readily provided insight into the municipal road network maintenance, energy and water supply, and funeral services, among others. He tried to extend the relationships to the Hungarian institutions of higher education as well. This contact was established in 1991, thanks to input from István Bakos, head of department in the Ministry of Culture and Public Education. Afterwards, he was elected guest professor by the teaching staff of the Faculty of Commerce, Catering, and Tourism of Budapest. This appointment was followed by invitations from other higher education institutions. Led by Miklós Horn, and later László Csizmadia, general directors of the Faculty of Commerce, Catering, and Tourism, leading professors of the teaching staff visited Leoben and the competent minister in Vienna, Austria several times on academic and contact-making tours. In 1992, the Convention of Rectors from Hungarian Economic Teaching Universities and Colleges held a delegate meeting in Leoben, where the participants were hosted by the town of Leoben, the Montana University, and him personally. At the joint session of the leading professors from the Montana University and the Hungarian Rectors Convention, Rudolf Andorka, Rector of the Budapest University of Economic Sciences, held a lecture on the impact of Hungarian changes on higher education.

During his position as a director, he pursued postgraduate studies at the University of Graz, lectured at the Montana University of Leoben (Montana-University of Austria: Managerial Preparation, Self-development, Communication, and Leadership Theories (1983-1991)) and was active as a forensic economic expert and journalist. In Graz, he had his own column at the Wochenpost with the title "Reflexionen". He authored roughly 600 articles in economics and social criticism. He published three scientific books during this period.

== After 1991 ==
Teaching positions in Hungary

- 1991–2004. College of Economics, Faculty Commercial, Catering and Tourism (KVIF). Today: Budapest University of Economics: psychology of economics/marketing and commerce, in both Hungarian and German languages
- 1991-2004 German College of Commercial, Catering and Tourism, Budapest. (Hochschule für Handel und Fremdenverkehr in Budapest): psychology, sociology
- 1991-1996 Corvinus University of Budapest: Psychology of economics/marketing and commerce
- 1991-1994 University of Pannonia (University of Veszprem): Corporate management of economics/marketing and commerce
- 1996–2004. University of West Hungary - Sopron: sociology, socioeconomics, psychology of economics/marketing and commerce, social and commercial systems, ethics/moral principles of economics/marketing and commerce – in both Hungarian and German languages
- As of 2004. University of West Hungary – Sopron, Professor Emeritus.

== Hungarian and German publications ==
Imre Menyhay published his research and his scientific papers in periodical scientific journals including in Gazdaság és Társadalom (Economy and Society - Journal of Social and Economic Sciences), Valóság (periodicity: reality), and Kapu Folyóirat (The Goal - Hungarian journal of the intellectuals)

=== Books ===
- Europäische Union aus Sicht psychischer Hygiene und der Sozialmechanismen. Auf dem Weg zu Vereinigten Staaten von Europa (European Union from the point of view of mental hygiene and the social mechanisms. On the way to United States of Europe) Trediton Publisher Germany, 20017. ISBN 978-3-7439-5050-4.
- Autoritásvákuum, pénzügyi válság és a dzsungel törvényei. Az etika aktuális kérdéseinek elemzése. (Authority-Vacuum, Financial Crisis And The Law Of The jungle. - The current ethical issues in the analysis.) Püski Publisher, 2009. ISBN 978 963 9592 82 7.
- Homo oeconomikus és a befejezetlen teremtés. Az analitikus gazdaságpszichológia alapvetése és alkalmazása. ( Homo Oeconomikus And Unfinished Creation. - The analytical background by economic psychology and its application.) Academic Publisher, Budapest, 2004. ISBN 963 05 8075 6.
- Gazdálkodás, vállalkozás, etika. Társadalomelméleti gazdaságszociológia alapvetése és alkalmazása. (Management, business, ethics.- Social Theory and background by the application of economic sociology.) Academic Publisher, Budapest, 2002. ISBN 963 05 7868 9.
- Bevezetés az általános szociológiába. A társadalomelmélet alapvető kérdései. (Introduction to General Sociology. - The fundamental questions of social theory.) Publisher: University of West Hungary, Sopron 2000. Second edition: 2001. ISBN 963 7180 75 3.
- . Adalékok Káin "esti meséjéhez". Gazdaság és szocializáció a jelenkori liberális társadalomban. (Addendum To Cain's Fairy Tales. Economics and socialization in contemporary liberal society). Academic Publisher, Budapest, 1998. ISBN 963 05 7458 6 Can be downloaded Direkt:
- Voltunk, megvolnánk – leszünk? Nevelés ideológiák kereszttüzében. (We Were, We Are, And Will We Be? Educational Ideologies In Crossfire.) Püski Publisher 1996. ISBN 963 8256 88 5.
- Vezetés, nevelés, neurozis. Társadalmi valóságok, szükségletek és szükségletkielégítés. (Leadership, Education, neurosis. Social realities, needs and satisfying needs. (BKE.) Hall Press, 1995, ISBN 9635030150.
- Ich erzähle meine Sorgen. Kindergedanken für Kinder und Erwachsene. (I'll tell my worries. - Children's Thoughts on children and adults) Graz 1991. Publisher Steirische Wochenpost Ges.m.b.H. I
- Kreativ-innovatives Denken und pädagogische Einsichten. (Creative, Innovative Thinking and Educational Insight) Frankfurt am Main - Bern - New York - Paris, 1990.. ISBN 3-631-41755-1. ISSN 0930-0848.
- Gibt es die ideale Pädagogik? Kritik der pädagogischen Praxis unter besonderer Berücksichtigung der Leistungsbeurteilung und der Kunsterziehung. (Is There an Ideal Pedagogy?) Frankfurt am Main - Bern - New York - Paris, 1990th. ISBN 3-8204-1524-6. ISSN 0930-0848.
- Führung - Erziehung - Neurose. (Desires, Needs, Neuroses.) Maudrich Publisher, Vienna - Munich - Bern 1985, ISBN 385 175 413 1.
- Amplituden. Thorsten Knabbe Publisher, Bahlingen, Germany, 1986. ISBN 3 924129 06 1

=== Book Sektion ===
- Elidegenedés, elidegenítés, pénz-elidegenítés Marx és Weber elméletében. (Estrangement, Alienation, - Money Exploitation in the Theory of Marx and Weber.) In: Dr. Csaba Lentner (Editor): Tudományos értékeink. (Scientific Values.) 285–299. ISBN 963-00-8852-5.
- A piaci vállalkozás buktatói. Homo sapiens a mérlegen. A Magyar Tudományos Akadémia kötete. (Second The Enterprise Market Pitfalls. - Homo Sapiens On The Scale. The volume of the Hungarian Academy of Sciences.) In: Gidai Erzsébet, Nováky Erzsébet, Toth Attiláné / Editors/: Hungary after the Turn of the Millennium. Budapest, 1999. 233–255. ISBN 963-508-150-2.
- Transzendente soziale Dimension und pädagogische Autorität. In: Elmar Lechner und Johannes Zilienski (Red.): Wirkungssysteme und Reformsätze in der Pädagogik. (Transcendental Dimension of Social and Pedagogical Authority. Publisher: Peter Lang, Frankfurt am Main - Bern - New York - Paris, 1988, 256–262. ISSN 0930-0848, ISBN 978-3-8204-1546-9.
- Europäische Union aus Sicht psychischer Hygiene und der Sozialmechanismen. Auf dem Weg zu Vereinigten Staaten von Europa.(European Union from the point of view of mental hygiene and social mechanisms. On the way to United States of Europe.) Fluentum. International economic and social science journals.ISSN 2064-6356. 2014 IV.

== Awards and acknowledgements ==
- Professor Emeritus status and title award. University of West Hungary, 2004th
- Szechenyi Memorial Award given by the University of West Hungary, Faculty of Economics. 2001.
- On the occasion of the seventieth birthday. Editor: Westungarian University
- Award for Hungarian Higher Education 1993.
- The Highest Degree of Legion of Honors for services of special value rendered to Steierland – Austria 1989.
