= Budafok =

Part of Budapest

- Neighbourhood in Budapest
- Motto: Hungarian: Kisváros a nagyvárosban (Small City in the Big City)
- Location within Budapest
- Coordinates: 47°25′12″N 19°01′42″E
- Country: Hungary
- Region: Central Hungary
- City: Budapest
- District: XXII. Budafok-Tétény
- Established: 1739 (Promontor)
- Gaining current name: 1886
- Becoming a city: 1926
- Becoming part of Budapest: January 1, 1950
- Named for: Hungarian: Buda-fok (Buda cape)

Government
  - Mayor: Ferenc Karsay (Fidesz-KDNP)

Area
  - Total: 11.35 km^{2} (4.38 sq mi)
  - Land: 9.46 km^{2} (3.65 sq mi)
  - Water: 1.89 km^{2} (0.73 sq mi)
- Elevation: 106 m (348 ft)

Population (2012)
  - Total: 26,782
  - Density: 2,831/km^{2} (7,330/sq mi)

Ethnicity (estimated)
  - Hungarian: 93.7%
  - German: 1.5%
  - Romani: 0.4%
- Postal code(s): 1221-1223
- Website: Budafok-Tétény

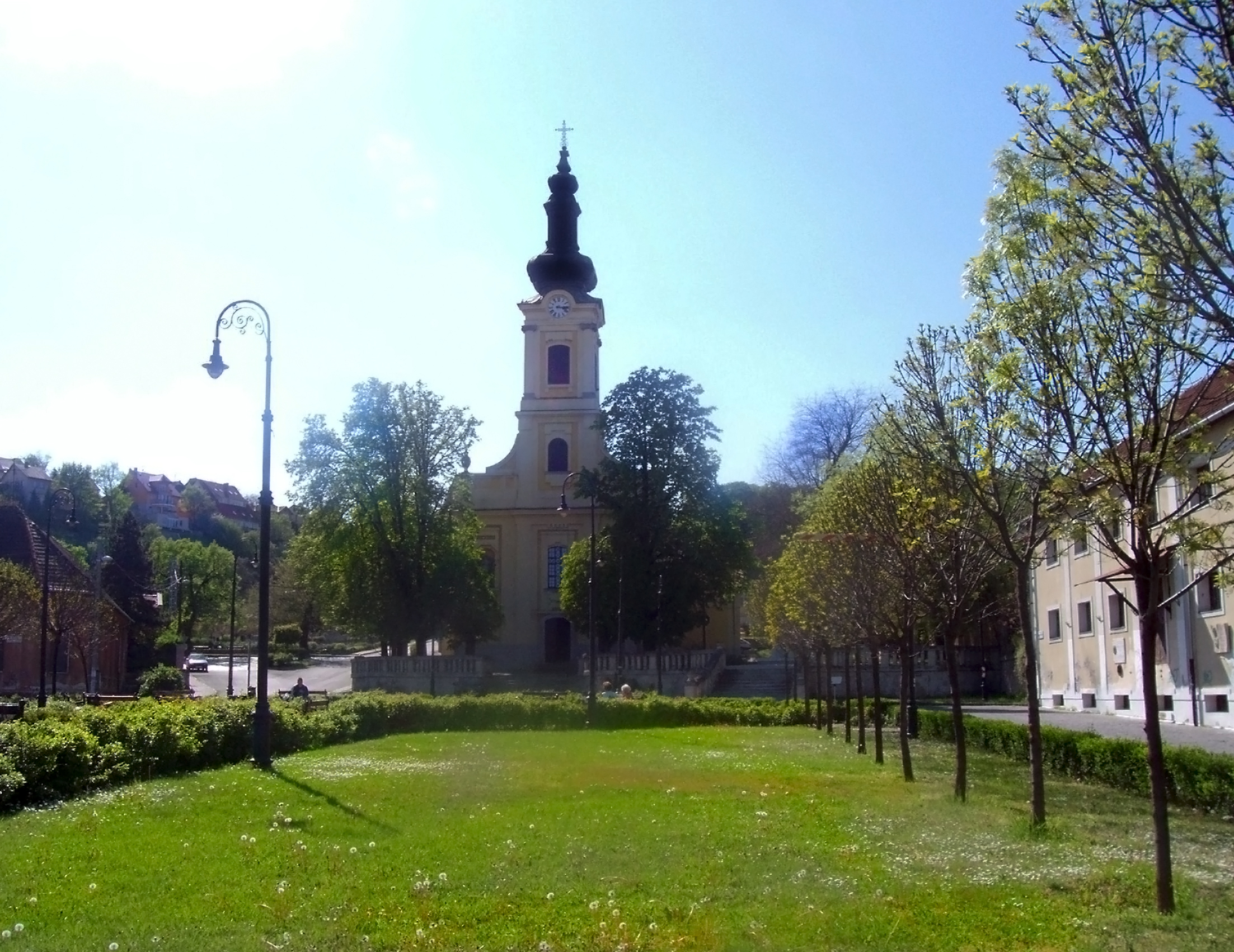
Budafok's Catholic church

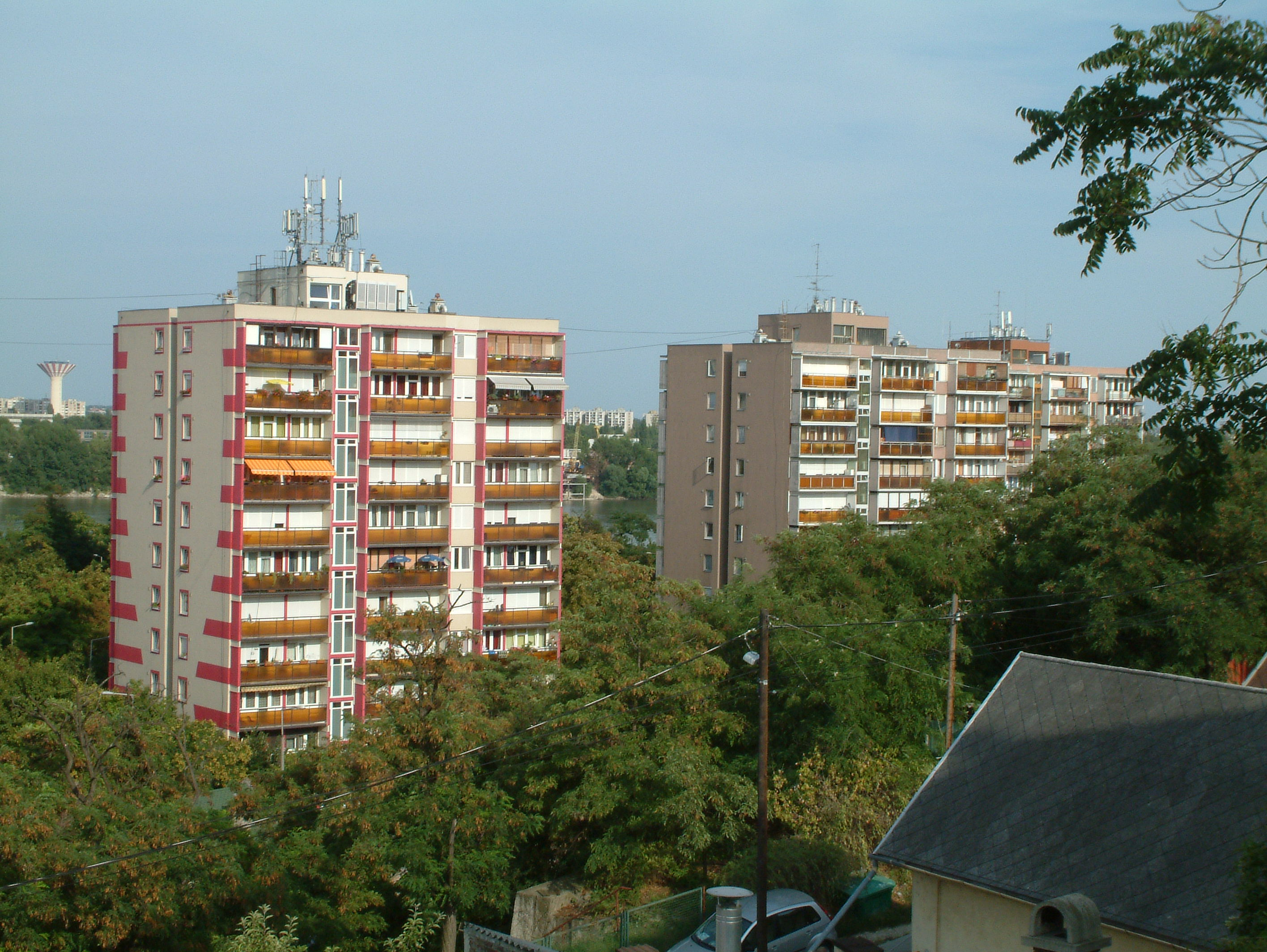
Budafok housing estate

Budafok (Latin: Promontor; literally "Promontory near Buda, or Buda Point") is a neighbourhood in Budapest, Hungary. It is situated in the southwestern part of Buda, near the Danube, and belongs to District XXII. Budafok was an independent municipality before 1950. The village was known for wine and champagne making. Prince Eugene of Savoy (1663–1736) constructed a palace between its vineyards, the Promontor palace.

== Name ==
Budafok was for many years known as ‘Promontor’ from the Latin Promontorium, meaning headland, but in 1886, the name was changed to its Hungarian equivalent, Budafok, meaning ‘Buda cape’. In 1950 Budafok was merged into Budapest together with Nagytétény and Budatétény, forming Budapest's district XXII. Budafok-Tétény is the official name of the district which covers 43 square kilometers and contains Budafok proper.

== Location ==
The borders of Budafok are: Ringló út from Horogszegi határsor - Méhész utca - railway line towards Érd - Hosszúréti patak - the Danube (including the islands) - Háros utca - Vöröskúti határsor - Horogszegi határsor.

== History ==
Historically, Budafok was ideal for wine production because of the Tétényi plateau and its slopes along the Danube. Budafok was home to what used to be the most important vineyard of the greater Budapest area as well as Central Hungary. In 1880, with increasing commercial wine production underway, a union of wine producing and bottling industries created a cellar network hollowed out of the limestone beneath Budafok. The cellar system, 25 kilometers in length and the largest in all of Europe, is still extant today. As such, Budafok is commonly referred to as "Cellar Town". Today, there is still a huge wine-cellar system with hundred-year old casks; among them the second largest cask in Hungary. The leading historical oenological site in Budafok is the wine cellars of József Törley & Co which can still be visited. Other wine producers still operating there are Hungarovin Rt, Promontorvin Rt and Budafokvin Kft. In 1899, Budafok was electrified by the Tiszántúli Áramszolgáltató Rt. (East-Hungarian Power Supply Company Ltd.).

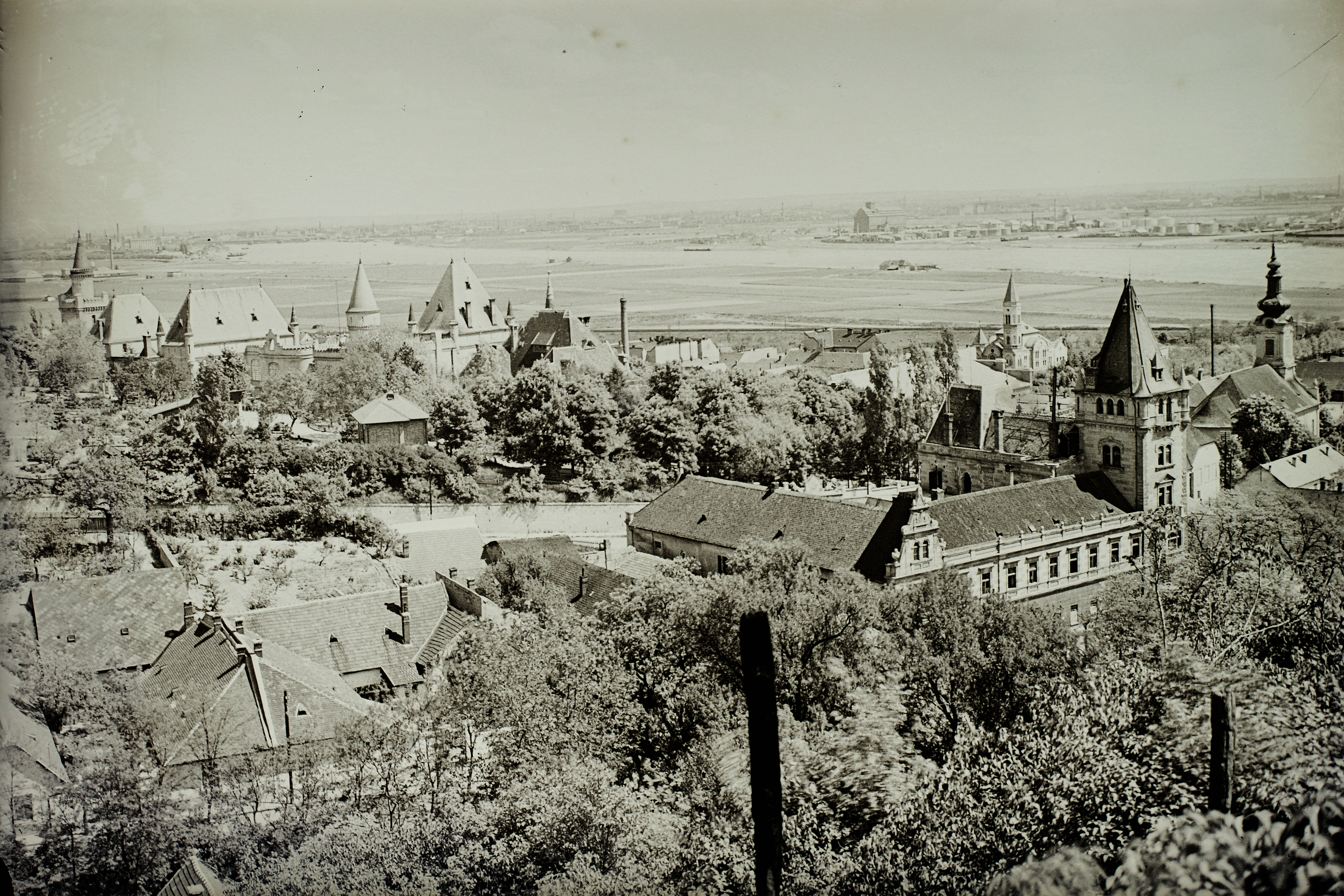
View of the Danube, Czuba-Durozier Mansion and Törley Mansion on the left in 1932

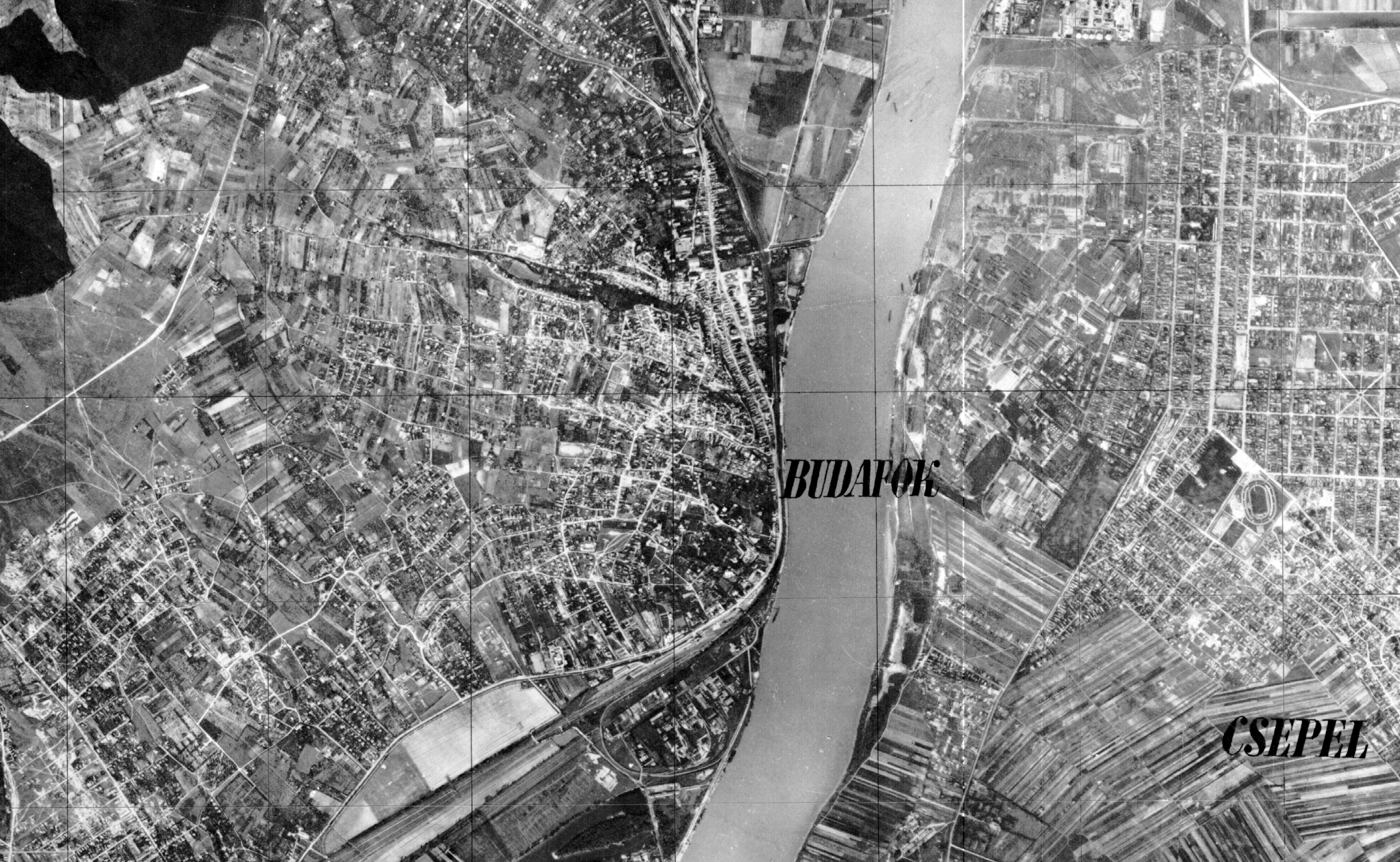
Aerial photo from 1940

== Sister cities ==
- (Germany) Bonn, Deutschland 1,300 kilometres (810 mi)
- Baraolt, Romania 640 kilometres (400 mi)
- Kristianstad, Sweden 1,220 kilometres (760 mi)
- Warsaw, Poland 680 kilometres (420 mi)
- Varna, Bulgaria 1,050 kilometres (650 mi)
- Wien, Austria 250 kilometres (160 mi)
- Koson, Ukraine 323 kilometres (201 mi)

== Notable people ==
- Imre Menyhay May 12, 1931 – October 23, 2018 (aged 87), Hungarian-Austrian economist, pedagogue and sociologist.

== Landmarks ==
- Budafok wine-cellars, 220-hectolitres Seybold-cask (Péter Pál utca 39.)
- Czuba-Durozier Mansion, Sacellary Mansion, Törley Mansion, György Villa
- Saint Leopold Church, St Peter and Paul Chapel, St. Michael Chapel, Budafok
- Nagyboldogasszony Parsonage
- Törley Champagne Factory Museum (1221 Budapest, Anna utca, Budafok 5–7).
- Törley Mausoleum (Sarló utca)
- Cave-dwelling Museum (Veréb utca 4)
- St. Christoph Jazz Gallery (Kossuth Lajos utca 88.)

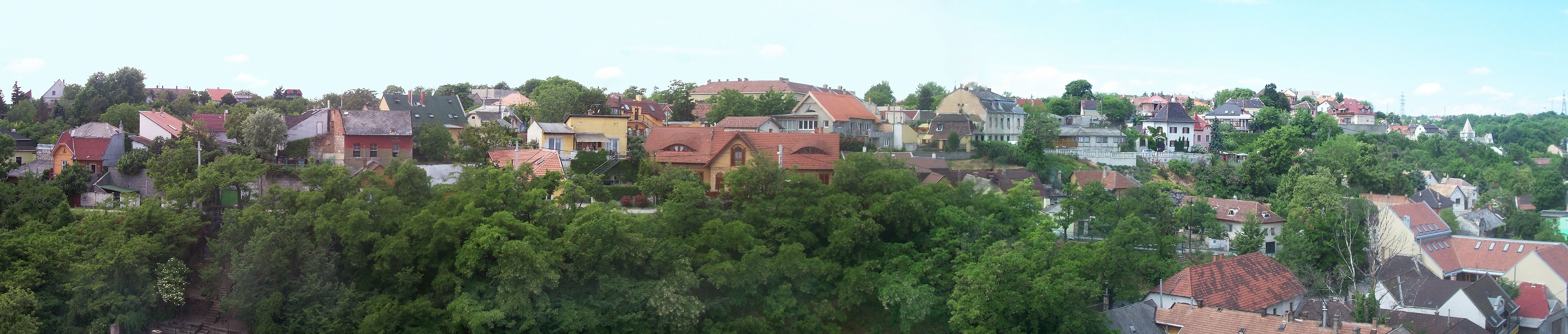
