= Blanquette =

Blanquette may refer to:

- A synonym for the name of various white grape varieties
  - In the southwest of France, alternatively Bourboulenc, Clairette, Graisse, Mauzac and Ondenc
  - In other parts of France, Colombard
  - In various European countries, Chasselas
  - In Australia, Clairette
- Blanquette rouge, another name for the French wine grape Canari noir
- Blanquette de Limoux, a French sparkling white wine
- Blanquette de veau, a veal dish
