= Mauzac (disambiguation) =

Mauzac is a grape variety mainly grown in the Limoux and Gaillac regions near Toulouse in France.

Mauzac may also refer to:

- Mauzac noir, another wine grape that is grown in Southwest France
- Mauzac, Haute-Garonne, a commune of the Haute-Garonne département in France
- Mauzac-et-Grand-Castang, a commune in the Dordogne department in Nouvelle-Aquitaine in southwestern France
