= Mauzac noir =

Variety of grape

- Grape (Vitis)
- Origin: France
- Notable regions: Southwest France

Mauzac noir is a red French wine grape variety that is grown in Southwest France. Despite the similarities in name, Mauzac noir is not a color mutation of the white Limoux wine grape Mauzac that is an important component in the Appellation d'origine contrôlée (AOC) sparkling wine Blanquette de Limoux. Today Mauzac noir is nearly extinct but at least one grower in the Gaillac AOC is attempting to revive the variety and make varietal examples of the grape.

== History ==
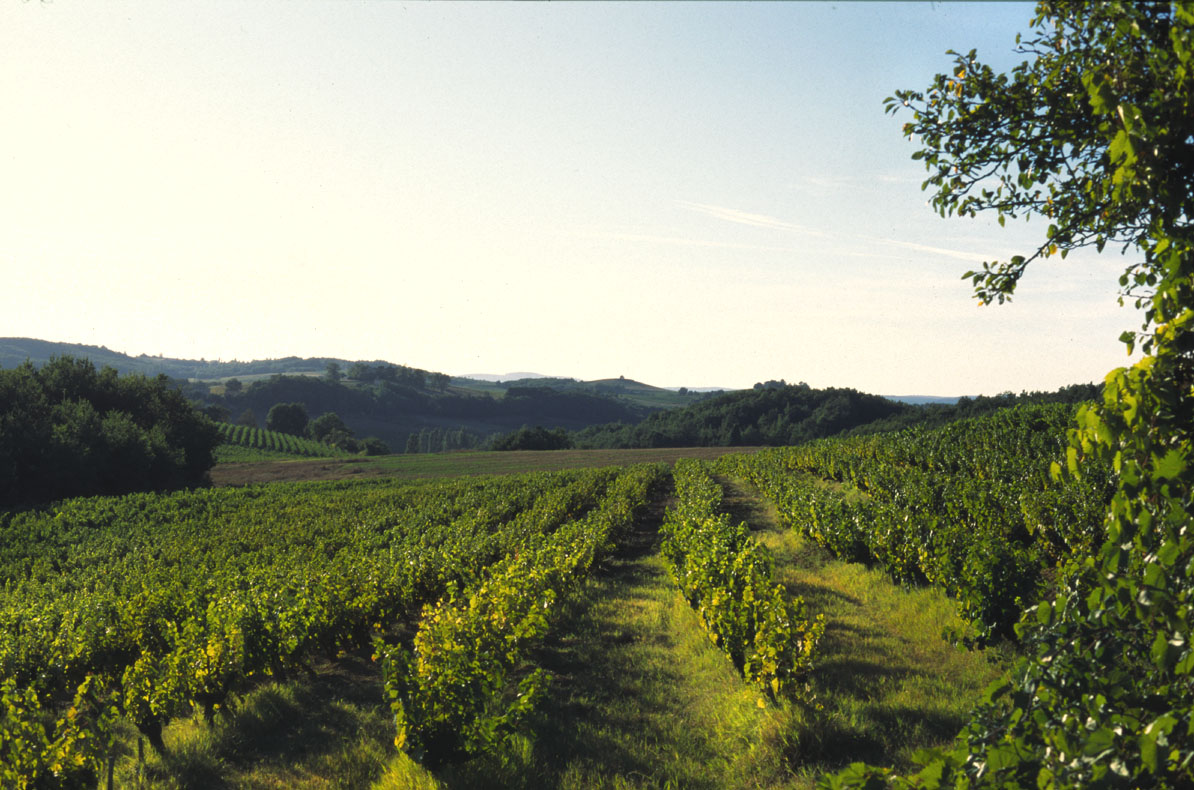
Vineyards in the Gaillac AOC in the Tarn department where Mauzac noir has been historically grown.

The earliest recorded mention of a Mauzac grape dates a 1525 document titled Livre de raison written by Antoine Antiquamareta who was the seigneur (or lord) of Villeneuve-lès-Lavaur in what is now the Tarn department. However, ampelographers and wine historians can not confirm which color Mauzac variety is being described in the document or in a similar 1564 document discovered by ampelographer Pierre Rézeau. Rézeau traced the first definitive mention of both Mauzac noir and Mauzac blanc to a 1736 report that described both grape varieties growing in the Languedoc wine region, producing round and "crunchy" berries.

The origins of the name Mauzac is difficult to confirm, especially since early synonyms for Mauzac blanc such as Mausague, Mausat and Mausax suggest that the commune of Mauzac, Haute-Garonne may not be the origin. Master of Wine Jancis Robinson notes that another commune, Meauzac, in the Tarn-et-Garonne may have a connection to the two grape varieties.

== Viticulture and relationship to other grapes ==
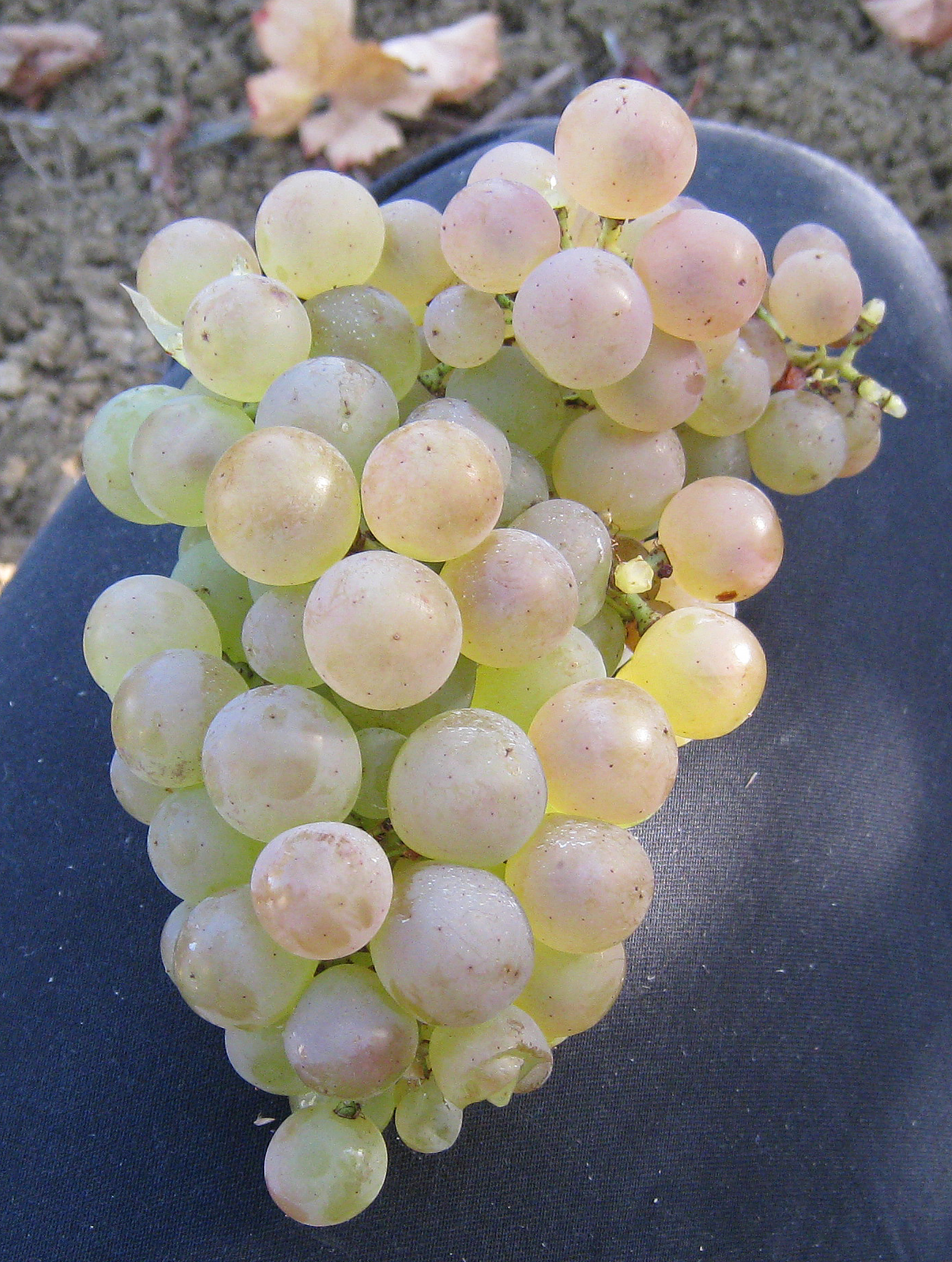
Ampelographers have confirmed that Mauzac noir is a not dark-berried color mutation of Mauzac blanc (pictured).

Mauzac noir is a mid-ripening grape variety that, what it can be very vigorous and produce expansive foliage, tends not to be very high yielding.

Unlike the relationship between Pinot blanc and Pinot noir or Grenache blanc and Grenache, Mauzac noir and Mauzac blanc are two distinct varieties and not a color mutation of one or the other. DNA profiling suggest that there may be a relationship between Mauzac noir and Fer but the exact nature of that relationship is not clear. Before it fell out of wine production, Négret Castrais, another local Southwest France wine grape, was often confused for Mauzac noir. While DNA analysis suggest that Négret Castrais may have a parent-offspring with Mauzac blanc, there is no known relationship with Mauzac noir.

== Wine regions ==
Despite its long history, Mauzac noir is not widely planted today. However, at least one wine grower in the Gaillac region, Domaine Plageoles has been cultivating the grape for use in blends and as a varietal wine.

== Styles ==
According to Jancis Robinson, Mauzac noir tends to produces fruity light-bodied wines that are often pale in color.

== Synonyms ==
A very rare variety that is not widely cultivated, Mauzac noir has not been known under many synonyms with only Feuille Ronde and Mauzac rouge being recognized by the Vitis International Variety Catalogue (VIVC) maintained by the Geilweilerhof Institute for Grape Breeding.
