= Duras (grape) =

Variety of grape

- Grape (Vitis)
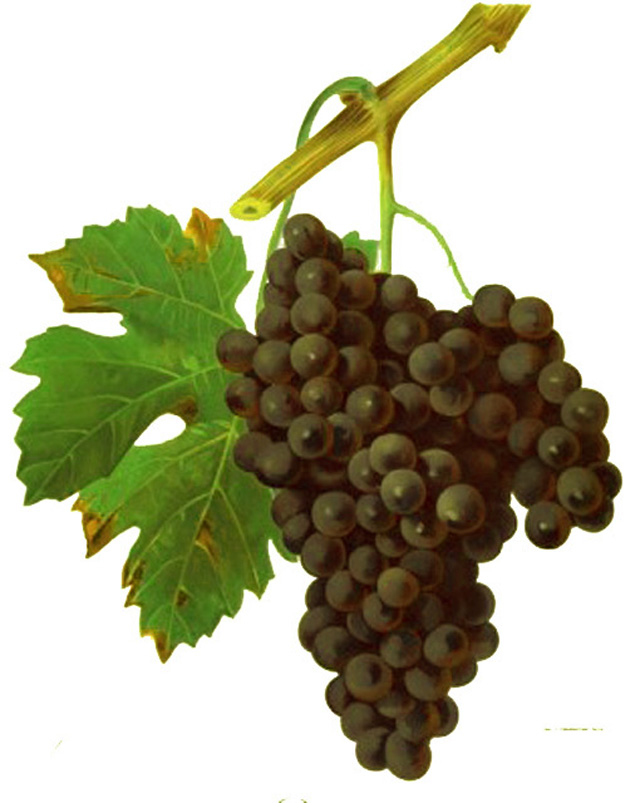
- Duras in Viala & Vermorel
- Species: Vitis vinifera
- Also called: Cabernet Duras (more)
- Origin: France
- Notable regions: Gaillac
- Hazards: Oidium
- VIVC number: 3735

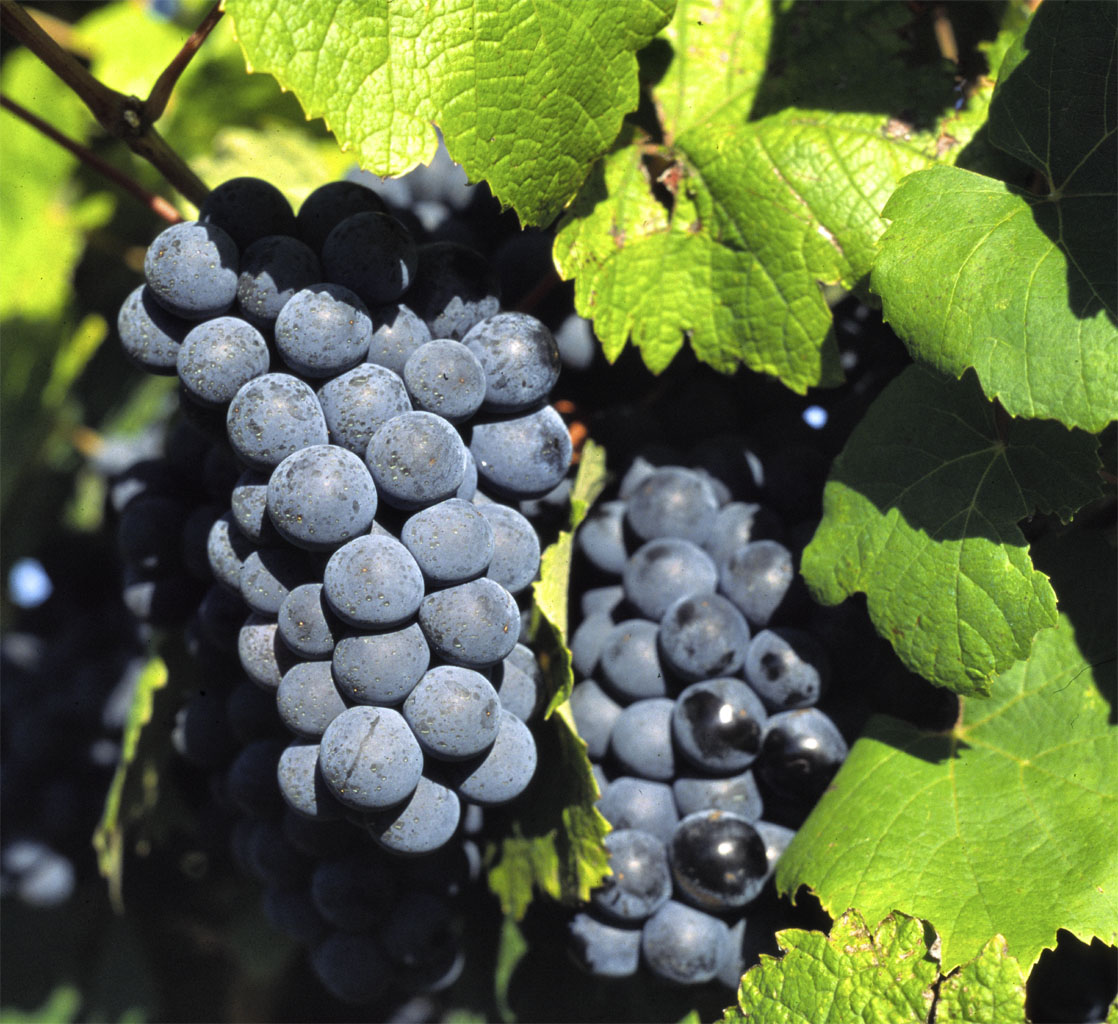
Duras grapes

Duras is a traditional French variety of red wine grape that is mostly grown around the river Tarn, northeast of Toulouse. It is usually blended with other traditional varieties, but production has been declining in recent years.

Despite the name the grape appears to have no connection with the Côtes de Duras east of Bordeaux, and is not grown there today. Nor is there any known link with the Durasa of Piedmont.

== History ==
Viticulture came to the Tarn with the Romans, but little is known of the history of Duras.

DNA fingerprinting has recently suggested that with Petit Verdot from Bordeaux, it is a parent of the Tressot variety.

== Distribution and Wines ==
Duras is only really found in the upper reaches of the Tarn, in Gaillac, the Côtes de Millau and the Vins d'Estaing north of Rodez. It makes robust red wines with a peppery note that are typically blended with other traditional varieties such as Fer and Négrette.

== Vine and Viticulture ==
The vine is susceptible to oidium and black rot with a tendency to bud early.

== Synonyms ==
Cabernet Duras, Durade, Duras Femelle, Duras Male, Duras Rouge, Durasca, Duraze

== See also ==
- Tannat
- Malbec
