= Savalan Wine Factory =

- Type: Private
- Founded: 2006; 20 years ago
- Headquarters: Azerbaijan
- Owner: “ASPI AGRO” LLC
- Website: https://www.savalan.az/

Savalan Wine Factory is one of the largest wine producers in the South Caucasus region. It is located in the Gabala district of the Republic of Azerbaijan.

== History ==
Savalan Wine Factory was established in December 2006 in the Gabala district of the Republic of Azerbaijan under the brand name “ASPI Winery” by “ASPI AGRO” LLC. The company’s main area of activity has been grape cultivation and the production of high-quality wines.

== Products ==
In the company’s vineyards located in the Gabala district, 22 typical grape varieties (“Chardonnay,” “Pinot Noir,” “Cabernet Sauvignon,” “Merlot,” “Grenache,” “Cabernet Franc,” “Syrah,” “Alicante Bouschet,” “Riesling,” “Viognier,” “Rebo,” “Arinarnoa,” “Floriesc,” “Verdejo,” “Marselan,” “Petit Verdot,” “Muscat Blanc,” “Montepulciano Aglianico,” “Traminer,” “Mourvèdre,” and “French Colombard”) and 14 table grape varieties (“Italia,” “Michele-Polleri,” “Crimson,” “Regina,” “Sultanina,” “Prima Cardinal,” “Victoria,” “Matilde,” “Muscat,” “Gambruski,” “Black Magic,” “Alphonse,” “Centennial,” and “Danlas”) are cultivated.

The company produces wines under brands such as Riesling, Verdejo, Moscatel, Traminer, and others.

== Guinness World Records ==
On December 18, 2024, the wine barrel of the “SAVALAN – ASPI Winery” was entered into the Guinness World Records as the “World’s Largest Wooden Wine Barrel.” The construction of this barrel took nearly five years. More than fifty highly skilled cooper craftsmen contributed to the design and production of this remarkable engineering project. Due to its size, standard robotic production lines could not be used, and all parts of the barrel were handcrafted. In June 2024, the barrel was installed on the premises of the winery's newly built museum complex.
