= Len de l'El =

Variety of grape

- Grape (Vitis)
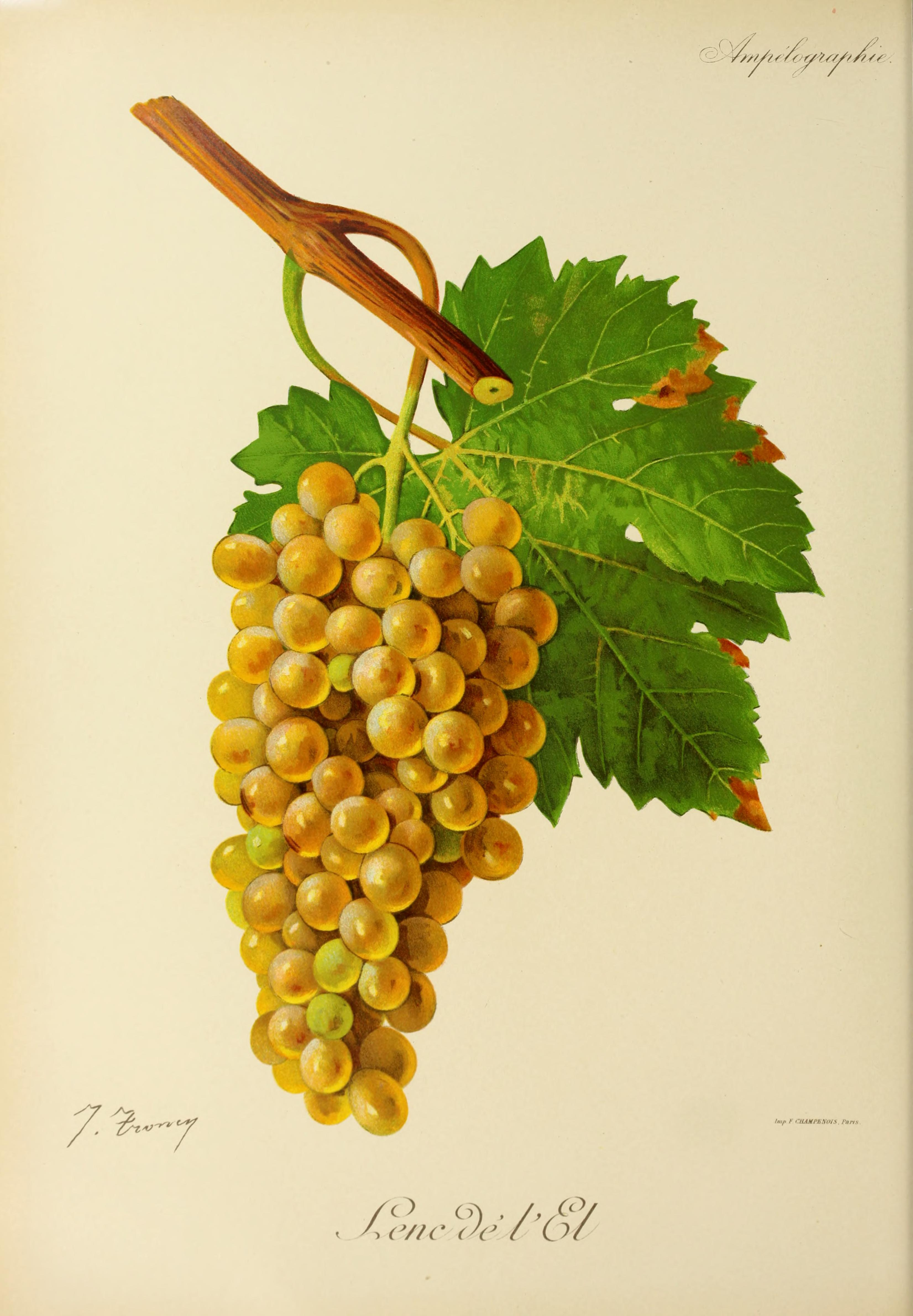
- Len de l'El in Viala & Vermorel
- Color of berry skin: White
- Species: Vitis vinifera
- Also called: see list of synonyms
- Origin: France
- Notable regions: South West France
- VIVC number: 6803

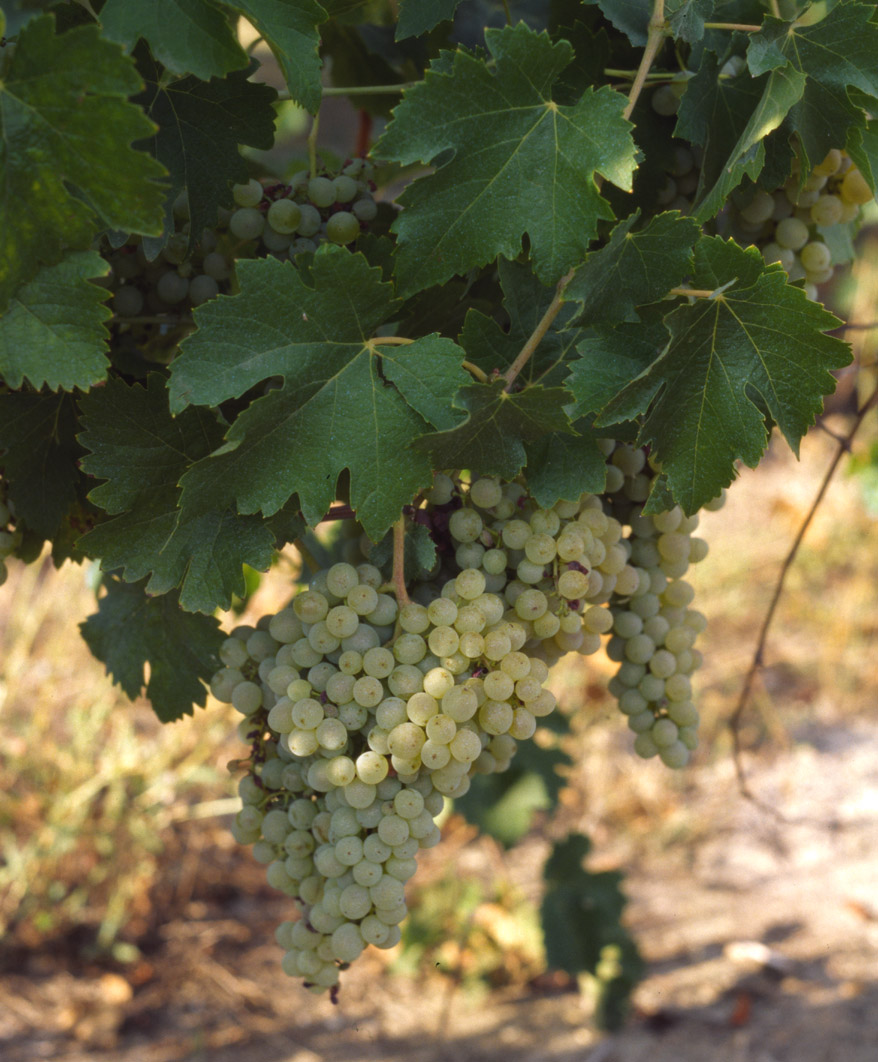
Len de l'El grapes

Len de l'El (various spellings have been reported: Len de l'Elh, Len del El, Lendelel, Loin-de-l'oeil; also known as cavalié or cavalier) is a white French wine grape variety native to South West France. Appellation d'origine contrôlée (AOC) regulation dictate that the white wines from Gaillac must include at least 15% Len de l'El blended with Mauzac, though there has been movements to allow substitution of Sauvignon blanc (and since 2007 growers have been officially permitted to do so).

Prior to the phylloxera epidemic, Len de l'El constituted more than 30% of all plantings in the Gaillac region. But the grapes are prone to rot and have been declining in plantings in recent times. The wines made from the grape are typically full bodied with low acidity but powerful fruit notes.

== History and name origins ==
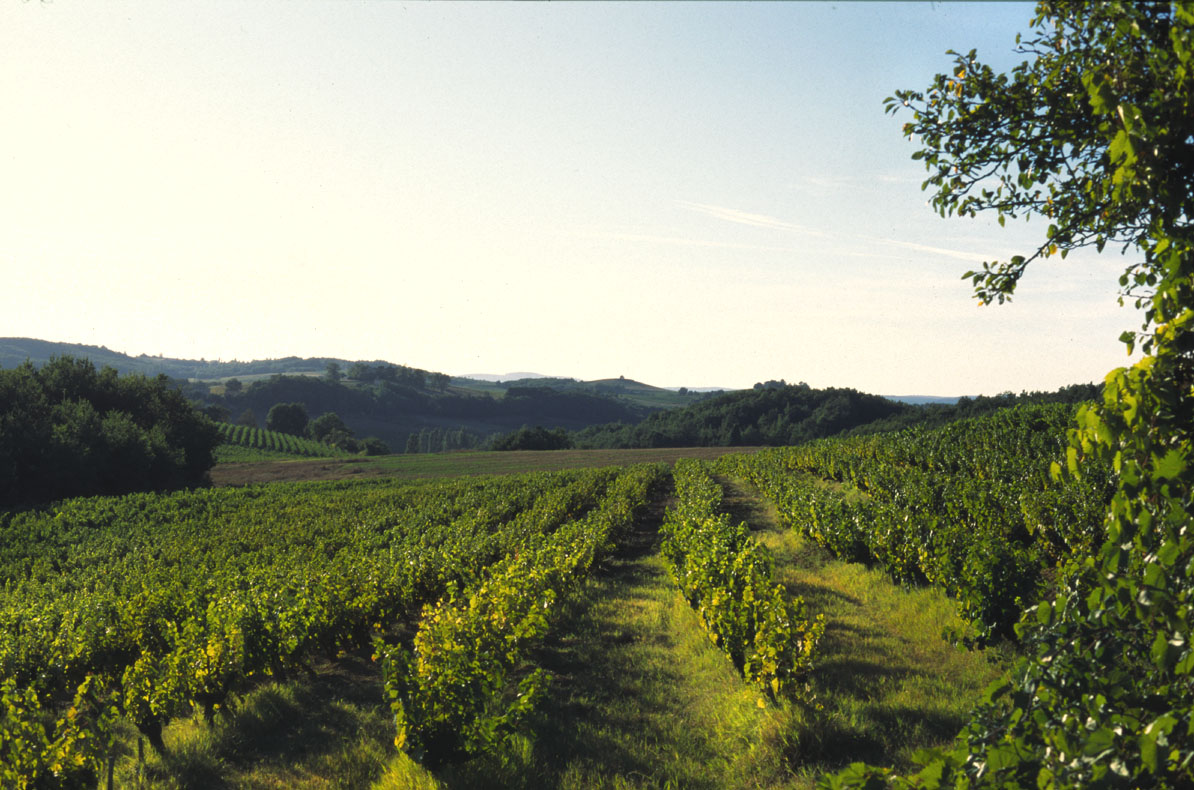
Len de l'El is found almost exclusively in the Gaillac region (pictured)

Ampelographers believe that Len de l'El is native to Gaillac region of Southwest France where it has had a long history of wine production. Even as the 20th century saw the introduction of new grape varieties and a push towards more international and marketable varieties, strong regional attachment to the variety has kept the grape from falling into obscurity. Like the Manseng family of grapes in the Jurançon, growers in the Gaillac region used the codification of wine laws for the Appellation d'origine contrôlée in 1938 to dictate a minimum usage of Len de l'El for all white blends produced in the area—thus sustaining its presence. While the laws were later amended in the 21st century to allow the substitution of Sauvignon blanc, the effects of the initial mandate for Len de l'El's use helped maintain the variety's presence in the region.

It is widely accepted that the name Len de l'El comes from the Toulouse Occitan dialect. Incidentally, it is phonetically similar to the French translation loin de l'œil meaning "far from the eye" with the synonym sometimes still seen on wine labels along with other alternative spellings. Wine expert Oz Clarke explains that the name refers to the position of the fruit in respect to the bud : the clustered grapes have long stalks that attach to the fruiting cane at a distance that is farther from the bud (or "eye", oeil in French) than most grape varieties. This explanation is supported by Gaillac wine growers and at least one French ampelography authority as well.

== Wine regions ==
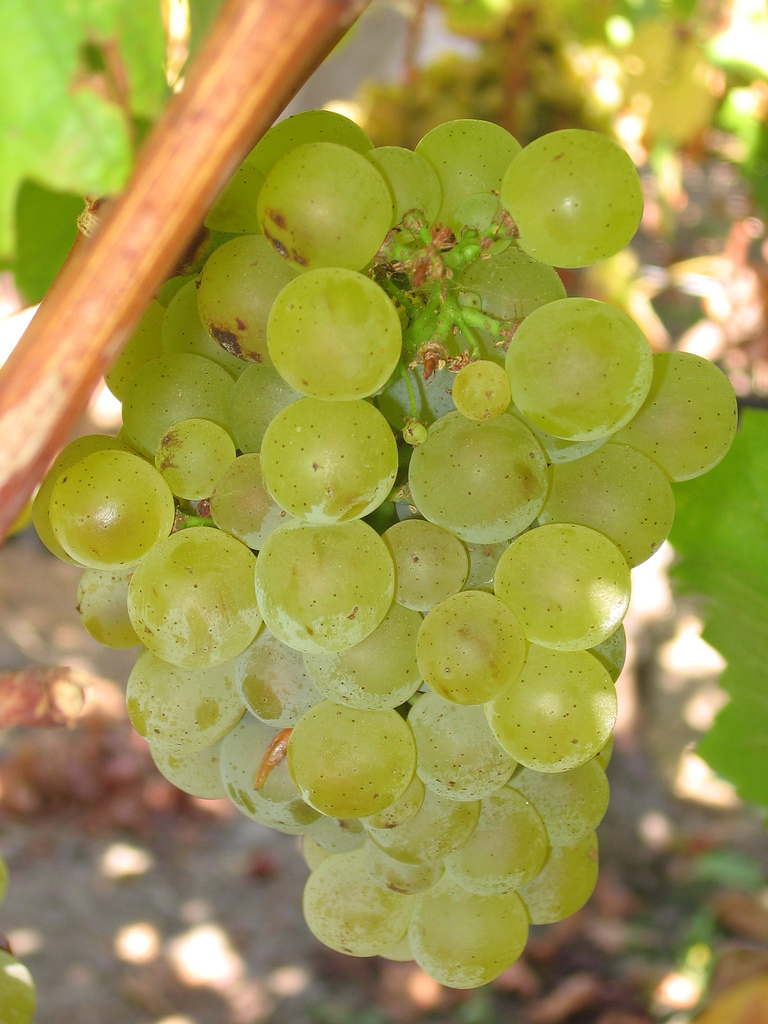
Gaillac growers can now substitute Sauvignon blanc (pictured) for the minimum 15% of Len de l'El required for AOC white wines.

Len de l'El is found virtually exclusively in the Gaillac AOC where it is a minor blending grape in the white and sparkling wine blends based primarily on the Mauzac grape. According to AOC regulations, at least 15% of the white blends must include either Len de l'El or Sauvignon blanc. Other grapes that may be blended with Len de l'El include Sémillon, Muscadelle and Ondenc.

The grape can also be found in the experimental wines of several vin de pays, most notably the major VDP of Southwest France Vin de Pays du Comté Tolosan where it is often blended with Muscadelle, Petit Manseng, Muscat blanc, Mauzac and Sauvignon blanc.

== Viticulture ==
Len de l'El is highly prone to various grape diseases, particularly the grape rots that can afflict vineyards in the moist maritime climate of Southwest France. Therefore, growers tend to limit plantings of the grapes to hillside locations with well draining vineyard soils and ventilation of air currents to keep the vines dry.

The vine can be quite vigorous and produce larger yields that can further dilute the character of the grape if not kept in check. While it is often blended with Mauzac, Len de l'El's tendency to ripen up to two weeks earlier than Mauzac can create some complications for growers which often requires Mauzauc to be harvested a little bit earlier so its acidity can balance the alcohol of Len de l'El.

== Wine styles ==
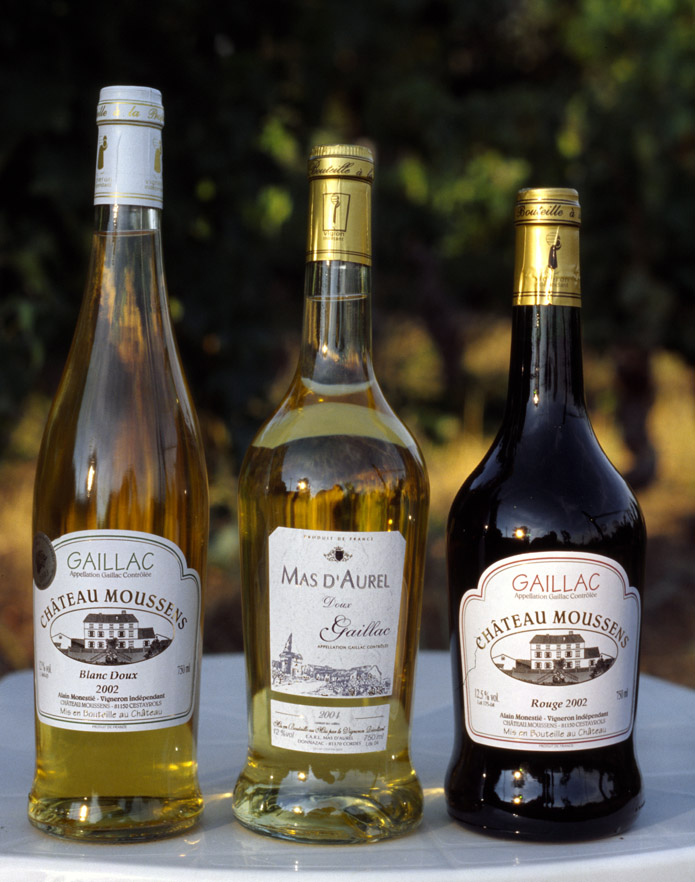
Despite the allowance of Sauvignon blanc to fulfill the minimum AOC requirement, Len de l'El can still be found in many white blends from the Gaillac AOC.

Len de l'El can ripen to high sugar levels but usually fails to retain the acidity needed to balance the wine and keep it from coming across as flabby. Still, it is a flexible grape that can be used in blends as well as sparkling and sweet dessert style wines. According to wine expert Jancis Robinson, the grape can produce "powerful and characterful" full bodied wines.

== Synonyms ==
Len de l'El and its wines are known under a variety of synonyms including Cavaille, Cavailles, Cavalie, Cavalier, Endelel, Kavale, Kavaler, L'Endelel, Len de l'Elh, Len del El, Lenc de l'El, Lendellet, Loin de l'oeil.
