= Limoux =

Subprefecture and commune in Occitanie, France

- Subprefecture and commune
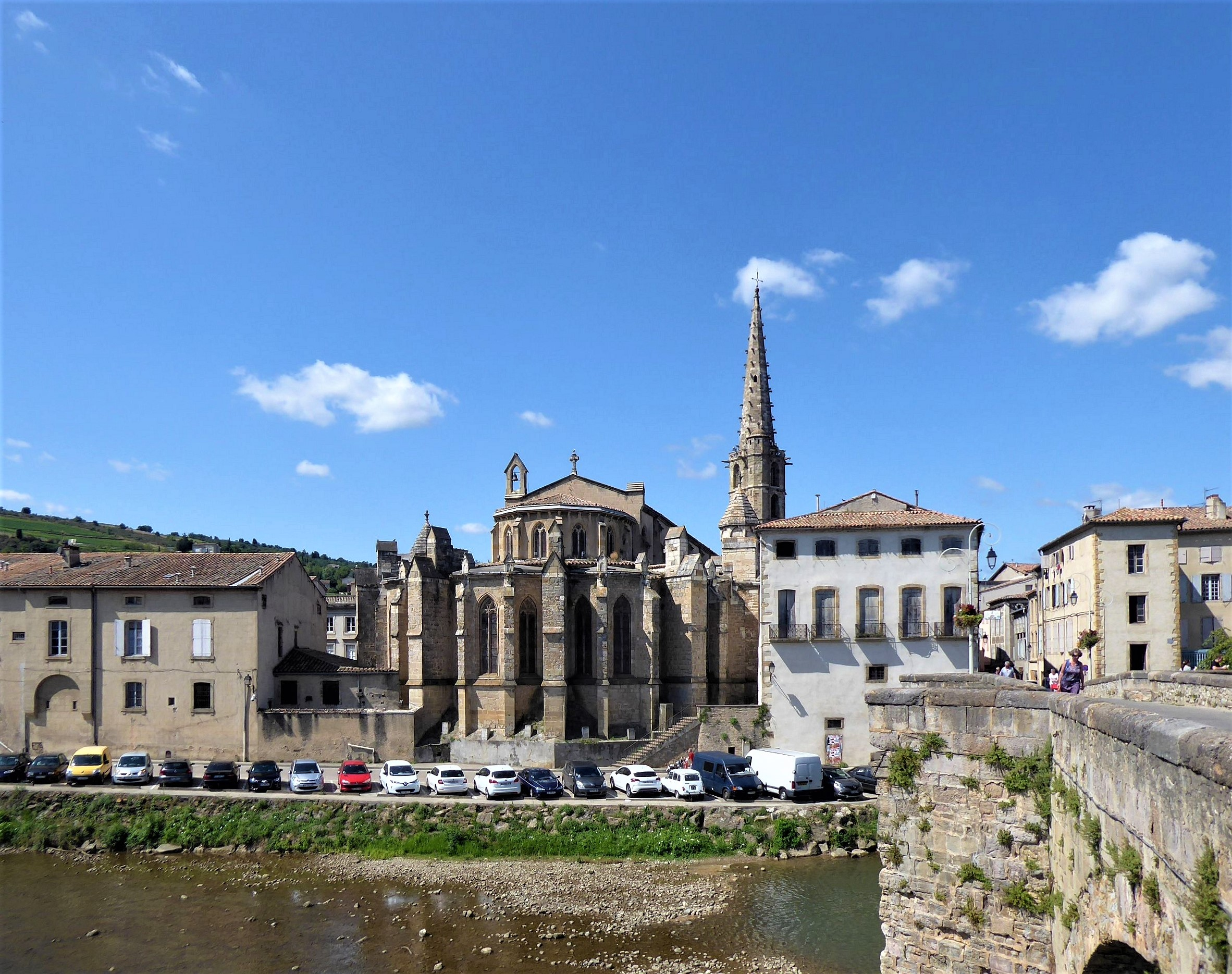
- Saint-Martin church and the Pont-neuf in Limoux

- Coat of arms
- Location of Limoux
- Location within France Location within Occitanie
- Coordinates: 43°03′28″N 2°13′09″E
- Country: France
- Region: Occitania
- Department: Aude
- Arrondissement: Limoux
- Canton: La Région Limouxine

Government
  - Mayor (2020–2026): Pierre Durand (PS)
- Area^{1}: 32.41 km^{2} (12.51 sq mi)
- Elevation: 172 m (564 ft)
- Highest elevation: 740 m (2,430 ft)
- Lowest elevation: 156 m (512 ft)
- Population (2023): 10,532
  - Density: 325.0/km^{2} (841.6/sq mi)
- Time zone: UTC+01:00 (CET)
  - Summer (DST): UTC+02:00 (CEST)
- INSEE/Postal code: 11206 /11300
- ^{1} French Land Register data, which excludes lakes, ponds, glaciers > 1 km^{2} (0.386 sq mi or 247 acres) and river estuaries.

Limoux (French pronunciation: [limu]; Occitan: Limós [liˈmus]) is a commune and subprefecture in the Aude department, a part of the ancient Languedoc province and the present-day Occitanie region in southern France. Its vineyards are famous for being first to produce sparkling wine known as Blanquette de Limoux.

== Geography ==
Limoux lies on the river Aude about 30 km (19 mi) due south of Carcassonne. In February 1965, it absorbed the former commune Vendémies. Limoux has two railway stations on the line to Carcassonne: Limoux station and Limoux-Flassian station.

== Population ==
Historical population

Year	Pop.	±% p.a.
1793	5,100	—
1800	5,142	+0.12%
1806	5,723	+1.80%
1821	5,915	+0.22%
1831	6,247	+0.55%
1836	7,105	+2.61%
1841	7,417	+0.86%
1846	7,444	+0.07%
1851	7,776	+0.88%
1856	6,835	−2.55%
1861	6,937	+0.30%
1866	6,770	−0.49%
1872	5,897	−2.27%
1876	6,661	+3.09%
1881	6,283	−1.16%
1886	6,810	+1.62%
1891	6,371	−1.32%
1896	6,684	+0.96%
1901	7,084	+1.17%

Year	Pop.	±% p.a.
1906	7,223	+0.39%
1911	7,010	−0.60%
1921	6,640	−0.54%
1926	7,639	+2.84%
1931	7,797	+0.41%
1936	8,193	+1.00%
1946	7,587	−0.77%
1954	8,334	+1.18%
1962	9,603	+1.79%
1968	10,824	+2.01%
1975	11,101	+0.36%
1982	10,206	−1.19%
1990	9,665	−0.68%
1999	9,411	−0.30%
2007	9,709	+0.39%
2012	10,180	+0.95%
2017	10,066	−0.22%
2023	10,532	+0.76%

Source: EHESS and INSEE (1968-2023)

== Blanquette de Limoux ==
Blanquette de Limoux is produced around the city of Limoux. The main grape of the wine is Mauzac, followed by Chardonnay and Chenin blanc. Wine historians believe that the world's first sparkling wine was produced in this region in 1531, by the monks at the abbey in Saint-Hilaire, Aude.

== Culture ==
The town is perhaps best known for its Winter festival called Fecos [ˈfekɔs], often referred to (inaccurately) as a Carnival or Fête. It is generally referred to as Carnival de Limoux in French language. It is known for its British expatriate population.

During the French Revolution, demonstrators forced officials to seal the granaries, demanded an end to dues and indirect taxes and then ransacked the tax-collector's offices and threw records into the River Aude.

== Images ==
Town square

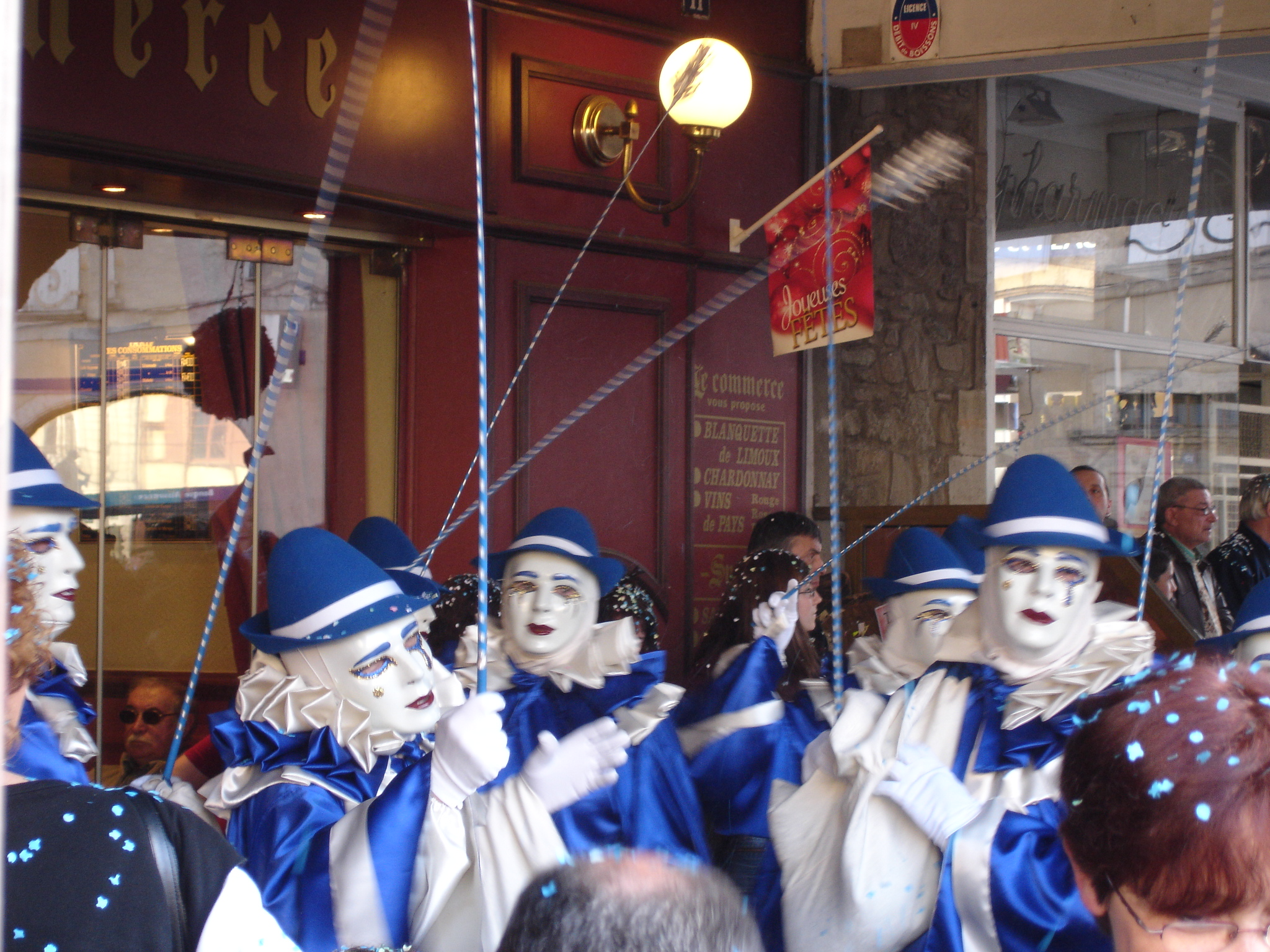
Carnival

== Sights ==
The heart of the town is the place de la République, a wide square with some fine stone arcading and a number of timber-framed houses. Limoux straddles the River Aude and the banks are lined with grand houses, especially on the eastern side, the so-called Petite Ville (lit. "Small City").

While worth visiting in itself, the town is also a good base for discovering the history of the region and is ideally placed for exploring the coast, the mountains and some good walking country.

=== Markets ===
- Weekly market every Friday (or Thursday if a public holiday falls on a Friday).
- Flea market or Brocante the first Sunday of each month on the Promenade du Tivoli.
- Evening markets on Tuesdays in July and August.

=== Other sights ===
- The Musée Petiet (Tourist Information Office),
- Musée du Piano (Museum of the piano)
- CathaRama (a history of the Cathar movement).
- Winery tours at Sieur d'Arques and Aimery.
- Jardin aux Plantes la Bouichère - Flassian, 2 hectares of gardens which is home to various collections of increasingly rare plant varieties. Currently closed, updated May 2024.

== Personalities ==
Limoux was the birthplace of:

- Francis de Gaston, Chevalier de Levis (1719–1787), Marshal of France
- Alexandre Guiraud (1788–1847), poet, dramatic author and novelist
- Bibiana Rossa (born 1960), Andorran politician

== Climate ==
Climate data for Limoux (1991–2020 normals, extremes 1945–present)
Month	Jan	Feb	Mar	Apr	May	Jun	Jul	Aug	Sep	Oct	Nov	Dec	Year
Record high °C (°F)	21.0 (69.8)	25.4 (77.7)	27.0 (80.6)	34.0 (93.2)	36.0 (96.8)	40.5 (104.9)	40.6 (105.1)	42.4 (108.3)	36.5 (97.7)	37.5 (99.5)	26.0 (78.8)	23.5 (74.3)	42.4 (108.3)
Mean daily maximum °C (°F)	9.9 (49.8)	11.2 (52.2)	14.9 (58.8)	17.6 (63.7)	21.4 (70.5)	25.7 (78.3)	28.6 (83.5)	29.0 (84.2)	24.8 (76.6)	19.9 (67.8)	13.9 (57.0)	10.7 (51.3)	19.0 (66.2)
Daily mean °C (°F)	5.7 (42.3)	6.5 (43.7)	9.6 (49.3)	12.1 (53.8)	15.7 (60.3)	19.6 (67.3)	22.2 (72.0)	22.4 (72.3)	18.6 (65.5)	14.6 (58.3)	9.4 (48.9)	6.4 (43.5)	13.6 (56.5)
Mean daily minimum °C (°F)	1.6 (34.9)	1.9 (35.4)	4.2 (39.6)	6.5 (43.7)	9.9 (49.8)	13.6 (56.5)	15.8 (60.4)	15.8 (60.4)	12.4 (54.3)	9.4 (48.9)	5.0 (41.0)	2.2 (36.0)	8.2 (46.8)
Record low °C (°F)	−15.5 (4.1)	−15.0 (5.0)	−10.0 (14.0)	−4.0 (24.8)	−0.2 (31.6)	3.5 (38.3)	7.0 (44.6)	5.0 (41.0)	1.0 (33.8)	−3.0 (26.6)	−11.0 (12.2)	−14.0 (6.8)	−15.5 (4.1)
Average precipitation mm (inches)	67.1 (2.64)	48.4 (1.91)	57.4 (2.26)	73.1 (2.88)	69.1 (2.72)	48.4 (1.91)	30.7 (1.21)	35.6 (1.40)	51.4 (2.02)	57.5 (2.26)	68.6 (2.70)	58.7 (2.31)	666.0 (26.22)
Average precipitation days (≥ 1.0 mm)	9.6	8.8	8.5	9.8	8.8	6.1	5.1	5.3	6.4	7.5	9.3	8.4	93.4
Source: Meteociel

== See also ==
- Corbières Massif
- Limoux Grizzlies, a rugby league club from Limoux
- Limoux wine, white wine, usually sparkling, produced in the area
- Communes of the Aude department
