= Tressot =

Variety of grape

- Grape (Vitis)
- Species: Vitis vinifera
- Also called: Tressot Noir, and see below
- Origin: France
- VIVC number: 12640

Tressot or Tressot noir is a variety of dark-skinned wine grape. Tressot has historically been grown in Burgundy but it is now almost extinct. Some small plantations still remain in the Chablis district of Burgundy.

The grape has been identified as a cross between Duras and Petit Verdot. Duras is a traditional French grape variety currently found only in the Tarn valley northeast of Toulouse. Petit Verdot is one of the classic grapes of Bordeaux.

In the literature it is often confused with the grape variety Trousseau, which is also known as Bastardo

== Synonyms ==
Tressot is also known under the following synonyms: Ancien Tresseau, Bon Tressot, Bourguignon noir, Bregin Panache, Foualliard, Fouallieux, Grand noir, Grand Tressiot, Grand Verrot, Gros Tressot, Guila noir, Morillon noir, Nairen noir, Nairien, Nairien noir, Nere noir, Neri Blau, Nerien Nerre Neuchateler, Noirien, Pendoulat, Petit Nerre, Petit Verot, Petite Nerre, Plant de Thoisey, Treceau, Treceault, Tresseau, Tresseau Ordinaire, Tressiot, Tressiot Enrage, Tressot noir, Vereau, Vero, Verot, Verrot, Verrot de Coulanges
