= Saint-Hilaire, Aude =

Commune in Occitanie, France

Saint-Hilaire
- Commune
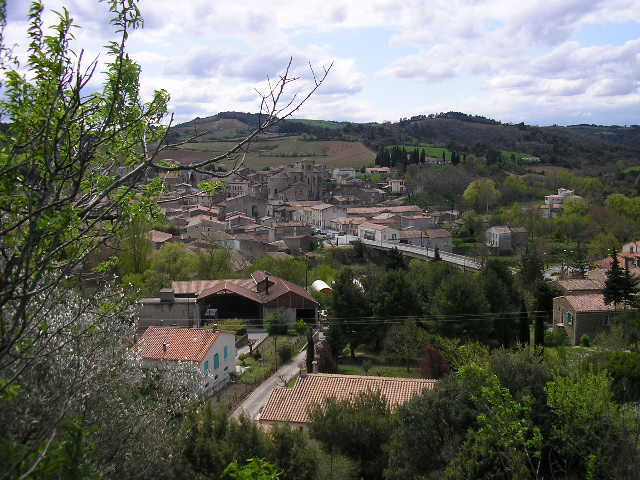
- A general view of Saint-Hilaire

- Coat of arms
- Location of Saint-Hilaire
- Location within France Location within Occitanie
- Coordinates: 43°05′38″N 2°18′38″E
- Country: France
- Region: Occitania
- Department: Aude
- Arrondissement: Limoux
- Canton: La Région Limouxine
- Intercommunality: Limouxin

Government
  - Mayor (2020–2026): Jean-Louis Carbonnel
- Area^{1}: 23.02 km^{2} (8.89 sq mi)
- Elevation: 170 m (560 ft)
- Highest elevation: 582 m (1,909 ft)
- Lowest elevation: 146 m (479 ft)
- Population (2023): 712
  - Density: 30.9/km^{2} (80.1/sq mi)
- Time zone: UTC+01:00 (CET)
  - Summer (DST): UTC+02:00 (CEST)
- INSEE/Postal code: 11344 /11250
- ^{1} French Land Register data, which excludes lakes, ponds, glaciers > 1 km^{2} (0.386 sq mi or 247 acres) and river estuaries.

Saint-Hilaire (French pronunciation: [sɛ̃.t‿ilɛʁ]; Occitan: Sant Ilari) is a commune in the Aude department in the Occitanie region in southern France.

== Geography ==
The commune of Saint-Hilaire is situated in the Aude department, midway between Limoux and Carcassonne in the region of the Carcassès. It is mostly covered by the forest of Crausse-Rabassié. The river Lauquet borders it to the north. It is crossed by the Meridian of Paris, otherwise known as the Green Meridian.

== History ==
The history of Saint-Hilaire is closely linked with that of the Benedictine abbey of the same name within its boundaries. It begins in the Roman era but the most important remains date from the Middle Ages. In the eighth century, the abbey was built under the name of St. Saturnin and then St. Hilaire, a former Bishop of Carcassonne in the sixth century. Over the course of centuries, the village grew to surround the abbey.

The abbots built fortifications around the village to protect it from the troubles of the Hundred Years War. A document of 1386 regulates the care of the keys of the village gates. In 1574, the village was burned and partly destroyed by the Protestants of the Lord of Villar.

During the French Revolution, Saint-Hilaire experienced some troubles. In 1792, troops had to be sent to maintain public order.

== Population ==
Historical population
Year	Pop.	±% p.a.
1968	751	—
1975	687	−1.26%
1982	595	−2.03%
1990	653	+1.17%
1999	699	+0.76%
2007	730	+0.54%
2012	766	+0.97%
2017	773	+0.18%
2023	712	−1.36%
Source: INSEE

Its inhabitants are known as Saint-Hilairois.

== Sights ==
=== Abbey of Saint-Hilaire ===
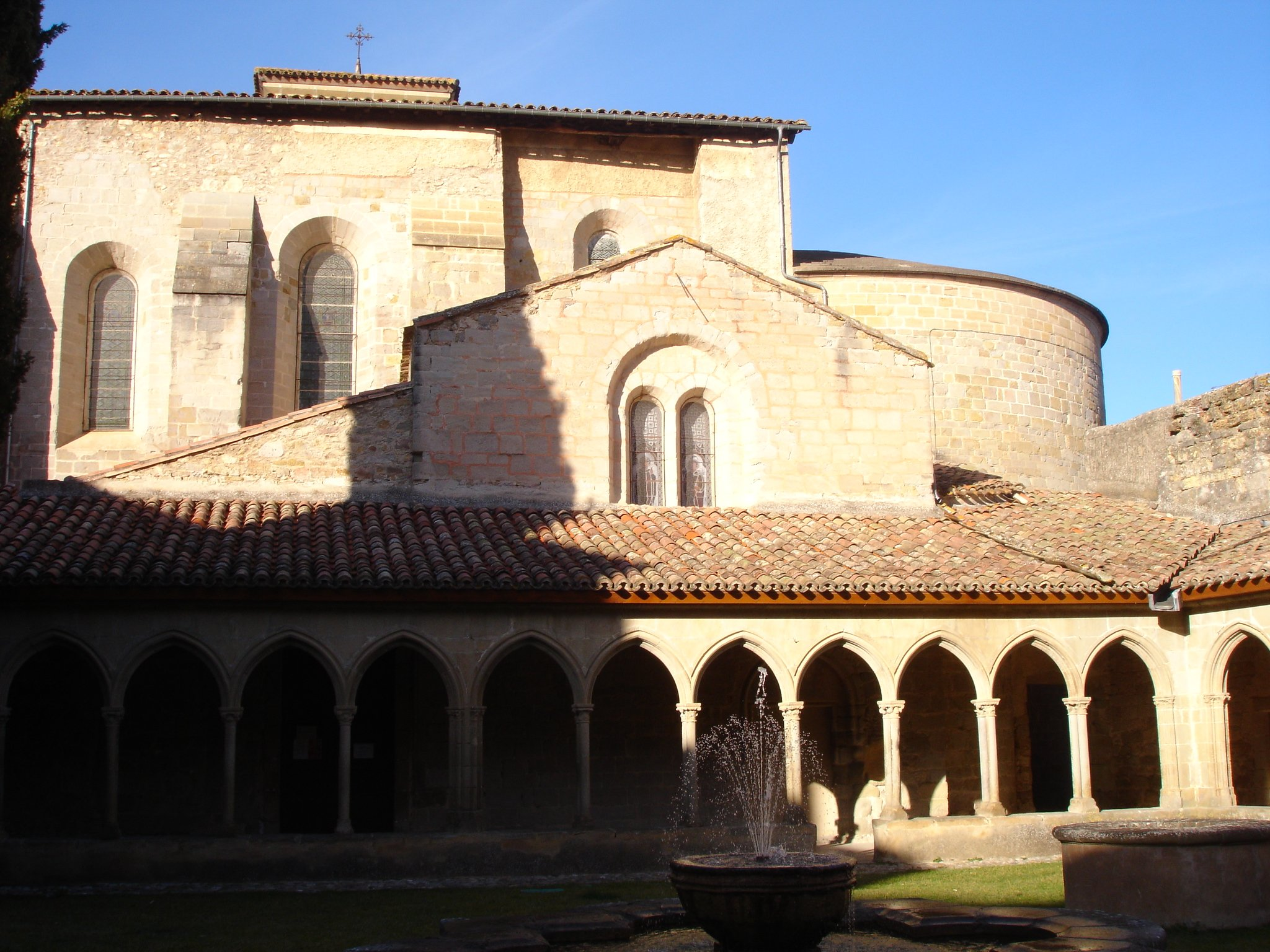
Abbey church of Saint-Hilaire

This ancient and fortified Benedictine abbey was founded at the end of the eighth century and dedicated to Saint Saturnin. In the tenth century, in obedience to the will of the Count of Carcassonne, the abbey changed its name and was dedicated to Saint Hilaire, the first Bishop of Carcassonne in the sixth century.

The monastery enjoyed a certain prosperity until the thirteenth century, but at the time of the Hundred Years War it suffered the devastations of war, the ravages of the Black Death and periods of famine.

The monastery, as it appears today, originated in the 14th century.

After a long period of decline, the abbey closed in 1748.

The monks of Saint-Hilaire discovered the first effervescent wine in the world, now known as Blanquette de Limoux. Blanquette de Limoux, shows up in writings from as early as 1531 by the monks of Saint-Hilaire.

Today it is possible to explore the ancient monastic buildings by guided visit.

== See also ==
- Limoux wine
- Communes of the Aude department
