= Alexandre Guiraud =

French poet, dramatic author and novelist

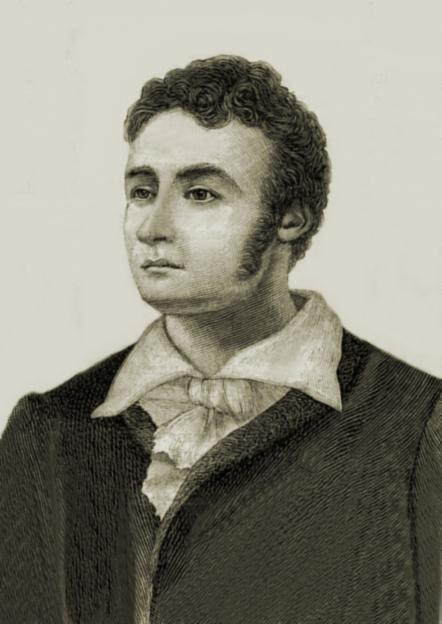
Alexandre Guiraud

Pierre Marie Jeanne Alexandre Thérèse Guiraud better known as Alexandre Guiraud (24 December 1788 – 24 February 1847) was a French poet, dramatic author and novelist.

== Biography ==
Guiraud was born in Limoux, in Languedoc (now in Aude), the son of a rich cloth merchant. He studied at the École de droit de Toulouse where he created a "Gymnase littéraire". He made frequent trips to Paris where the success of his poetry opened the doors to the Académie française to which he was elected against Alphonse de Lamartine in 1826. He was named Baron by Charles X in 1827 in reward for his contribution to the opera Pharamond. He was the author of many elegiac poems as well as tragedies and novels. He died in Paris.

== Works ==
- Élégies savoyardes (1822)
- Les Machabées, ou le Martyre, tragédie en 5 actes, Paris, Théâtre de l'Odéon, 14 June 1822
- Le Comte Julien, ou l'Expiation, tragédie en 5 actes, Paris, Théâtre de l'Odéon, 12 April 1823
- Cadix ou la délivrance de l'Espagne (1823)
- Chants hellènes, Byron, Ipsara (1824)
- Poèmes et chants élégiaques (1824)
- Pharamond, poème de MM. Ancelot, Guiraud, et Soumet, musique de MM. Boieldieu, Berton et Kreutzer, Paris, Académie royale de musique, 10 June 1825
- Le Prêtre (1826)
- Virginie, tragédie en 5 actes et en vers, Paris, Théâtre-Français, 28 April 1827
- Césaire, révélation (2 vol.) (1830)
- La Communion du duc de Bordeaux (1832)
- Les Deux Princes (1832)
- De la Vérité dans le système représentatif (1834)
- Flavien, ou De Rome au désert (3 vol.) (1835)
- Poésies dédiées à la jeunesse (1836)
- Philosophie catholique de l'histoire, ou l'Histoire expliquée; introduction renfermant l'histoire de la création universelle (3 vol.) (1839–41)
- Le Cloître de Villemartin, poésie (1843)
- Œuvres complètes (4 vol.) (1845)
