= Côtes de Duras =

French wine

- Wine region
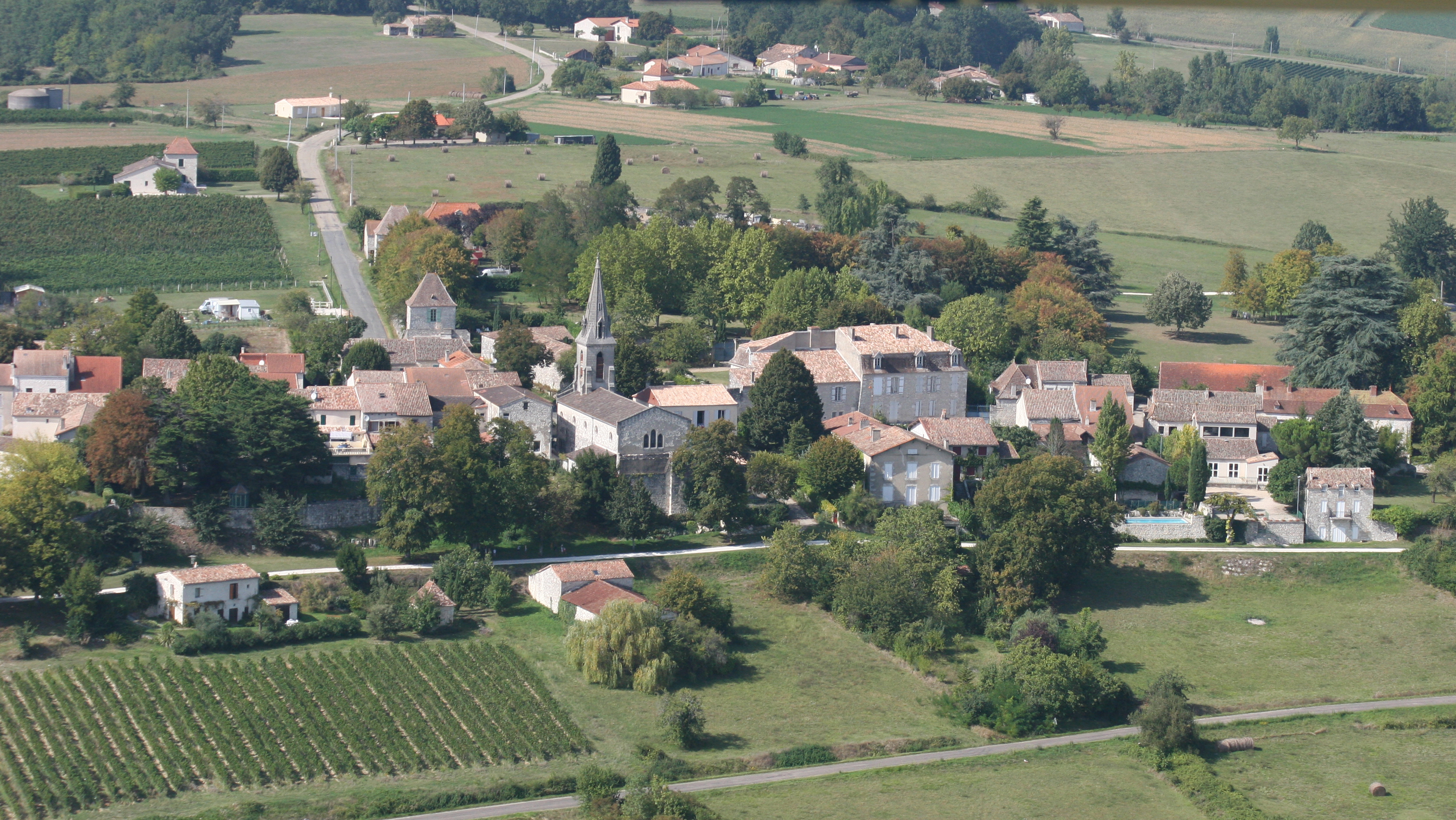
- Type: AOC
- Year established: 1937
- Country: France

Côtes de Duras is an Appellation d'Origine Contrôlée (AOC) for red and white wines in South West France. Côtes de Duras is located in the department of Lot-et-Garonne, and is located immediately adjacent to the Bordeaux wine region, which is restricted to the Gironde department, as an extension of Bordeaux immediately to the east of the departmental border.

== History ==
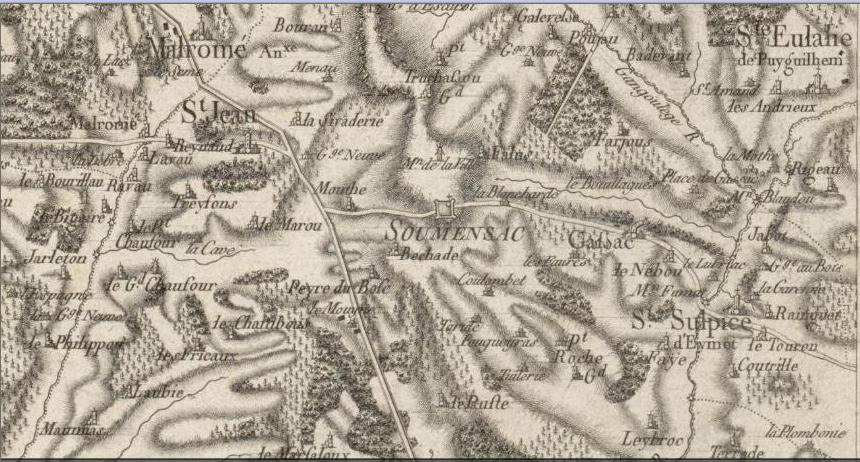
18th century map of the area that includes several communes in the Côtes de Duras.

Wine from the area around Duras have been famous since the time of the French monarch, Francis I. After the Edict of Nantes had been revoked and local French Protestants had moved to the Low Countries, wine exports to ports around the North Sea suddenly expanded.

Later this area became part of the Haut Pays Bordelais or upper Bordeaux wine country, and its exports were handled by merchants based in the Chartrons district of the city of Bordeaux, just like the wines produced closer to the city of Bordeaux itself. This was a golden age, which ended when use of the Bordeaux appellation was restricted to wines from the Gironde department in the 1930s.

This appellation was granted on 16 February 1937.

== Climate and geography ==
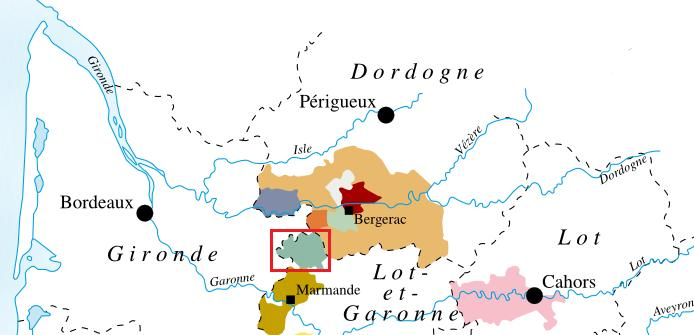
The Côtes de Duras (highlighted in red box) is almost equal distance between Bordeaux and Cahors and is just southwest of Bergerac.

The Côtes de Duras oceanic climate is identical to that of the Bordeaux region, except that it experiences slightly more extreme temperatures because of its distance from the ocean. This wine-growing area is situated in the north-west of Lot-et-Garonne where it borders the Gironde and Dordogne departments.

Wine from this appellation grows on tertiary fluvio-lacustrine sediments that occur in three different forms:

- Calcaire de Castillon (Castillon calcereous), which is white, chalky and contains cracks of varying depths.
- Molasses de l'Agenais (Agenais Molasses), which is layers of clay or clay-sand mix alternating with beds of gravel.
- Calcaire blanc de l'Agenais (Agenais white calcereous).

== Wine-growing area ==
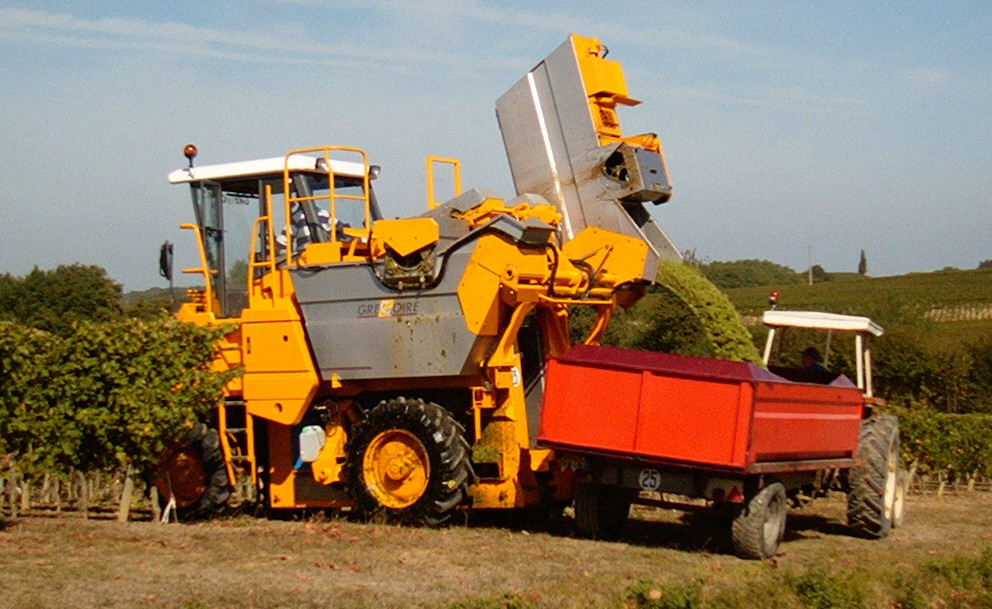
Harvesting Sauvignon blanc grapes in the Côtes de Duras with a mechanical harvester.

This terroir lies on the right bank of the Dropt and is divided into two by the Dourdèze valley. This wine-growing area is spread across 15 communes: Auriac-sur-Dropt, Baleyssagues, Duras, Esclottes, Loubes-Bernac, Moustier, Pardaillan, Saint-Astier, Sainte-Colombe-de-Duras, Saint-Jean-de-Duras, Saint-Sernin, La Sauvetat-du-Dropt, Savignac-de-Duras, Soumensac and Villeneuve-de-Duras.

=== Organizational structures ===
According to 2005 data provided by the INAO (Institut National des Appellations d'Origine), 121,948 hectolitres were produced from 2,038 hectares, and production was spread across 86 private cellars and 3 cooperative cellars and wine-merchants.

== Grape varieties and wines ==
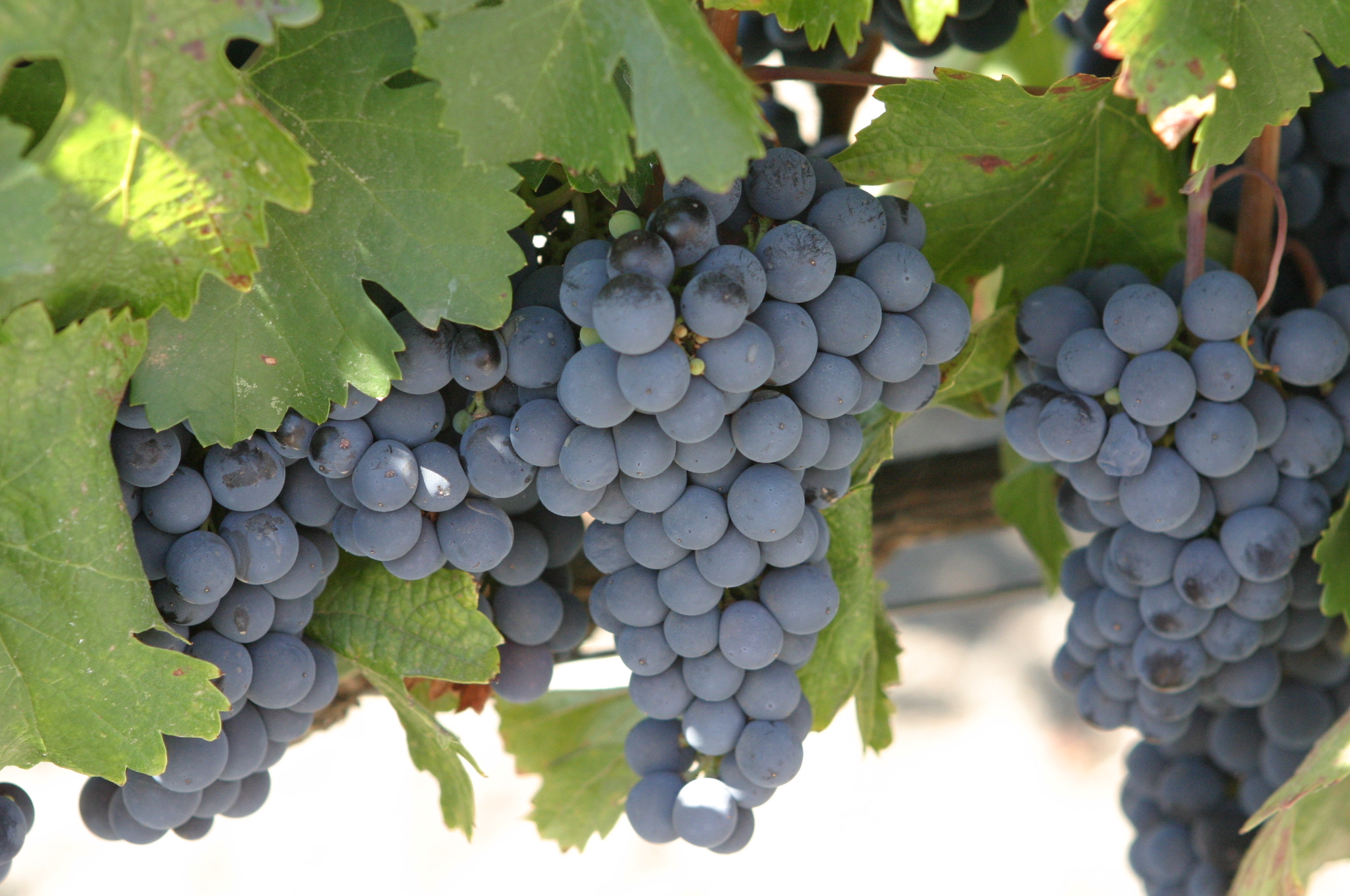
Malbec.

- White wines: Sauvignon blanc, Sémillon, Muscadelle, Mauzac, Rouchelein or Chenin blanc and Ondenc. Ugni blanc is a supplementary grape variety that may not exceed 25% of the total used.
- Red wines: Cabernet Sauvignon, Cabernet Franc, Merlot and Côt.
- Dry white wines: restricted to a yield of 60 hectolitres/hectare, these wines are characterized by their Sauvignon-like nose and vigorous flavours. They are produced at low temperatures and sometimes undergo pre-fermentation maceration or are matured on the lees.
- Medium-sweet white wines: restricted to 50 hectolitres/hectare, these wines have an aroma of candied fruit. Some batches are made into dessert wines using the sweetest grapes from the crop that have been harvested at regular intervals.
- Rosé wines: restricted to 55 hectolitres/hectare, these wines are fresh and fruity. They are made from juice that has been bled from red wine vats.
- Red wines: restricted to 55 hectolitres/hectare, they are usually supple and fruity, but some batches, in particular those that have been aged in oak casks, can be more robust. They are produced by a long maceration process.
