= Carnival of Limoux =

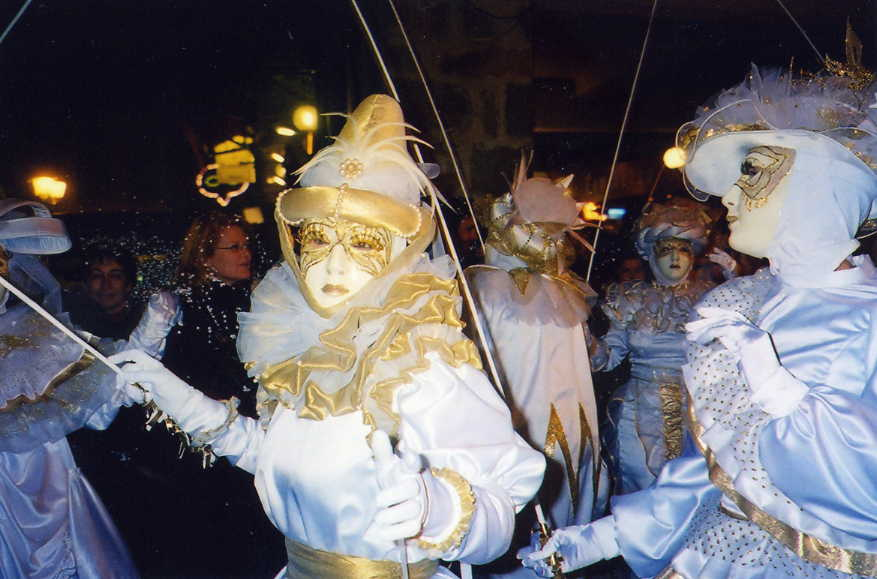
The Pierrots of the Carnival

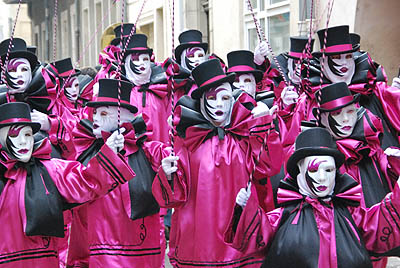
Bande Las Coudenos

The Carnival of Limoux (French: Carnaval de Limoux) is an annual festival held in Limoux, Languedoc-Roussillon, France. It takes place for three months on the weekends between January and Mardi Gras and is conducted in Occitan, the area's traditional language.

The festival is famous for its alternation of bands and pierrots.

== History ==
According to a tradition that dates to the 14th century, millers were released at Mardi Gras from their dues to the Dominican priory at Prouille and celebrated by walking through the streets scattering sugared almonds and flour, accompanied by minstrels. The carnival has been celebrated in Limoux since 1604.

The wine festival Toques & Clochers has been held in Limoux every spring since 2011. The café scene is dominant in Limoux where food and drink are the dominant cultural pastime.

== Gallery ==
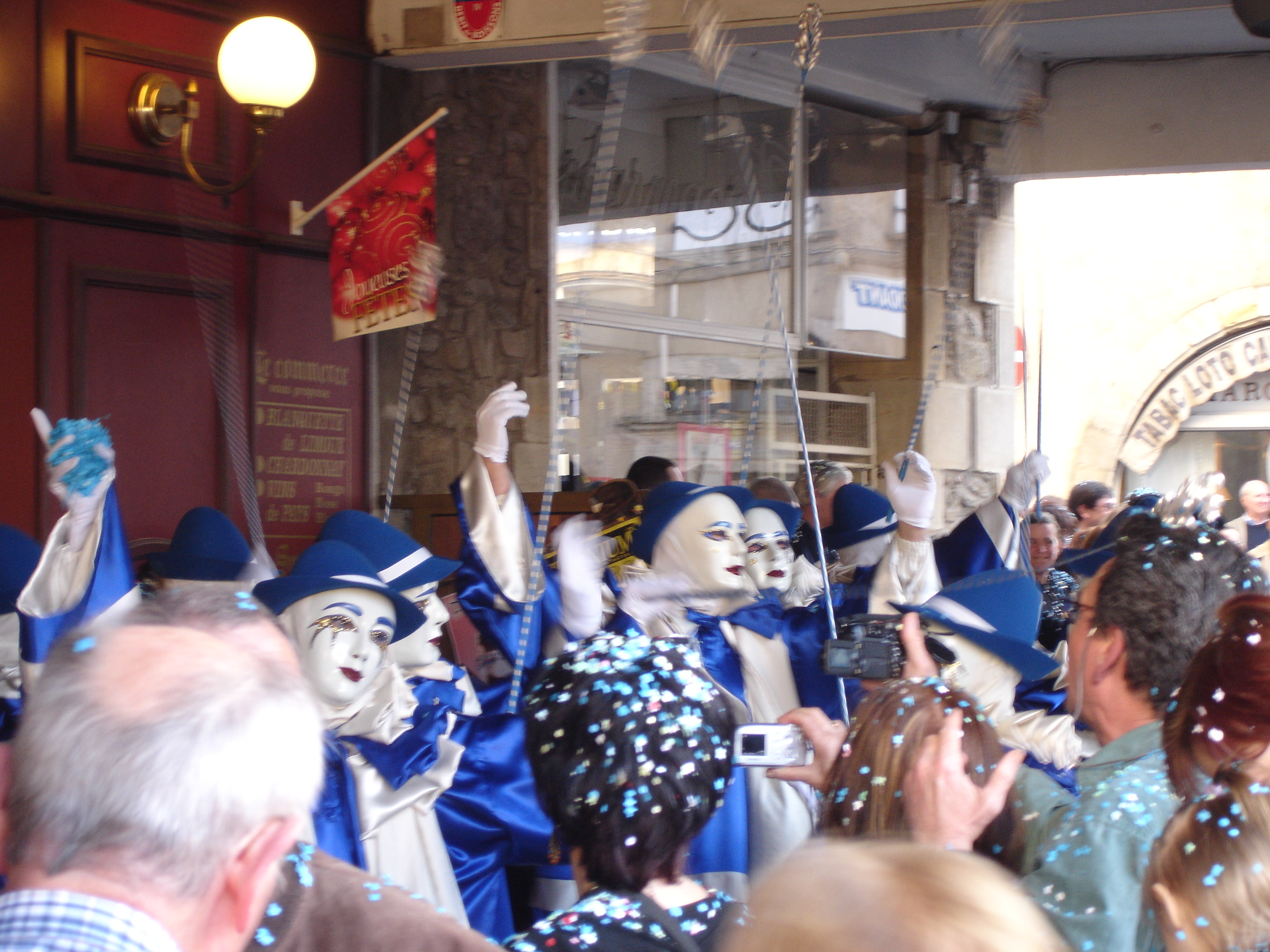
Characteristic scene

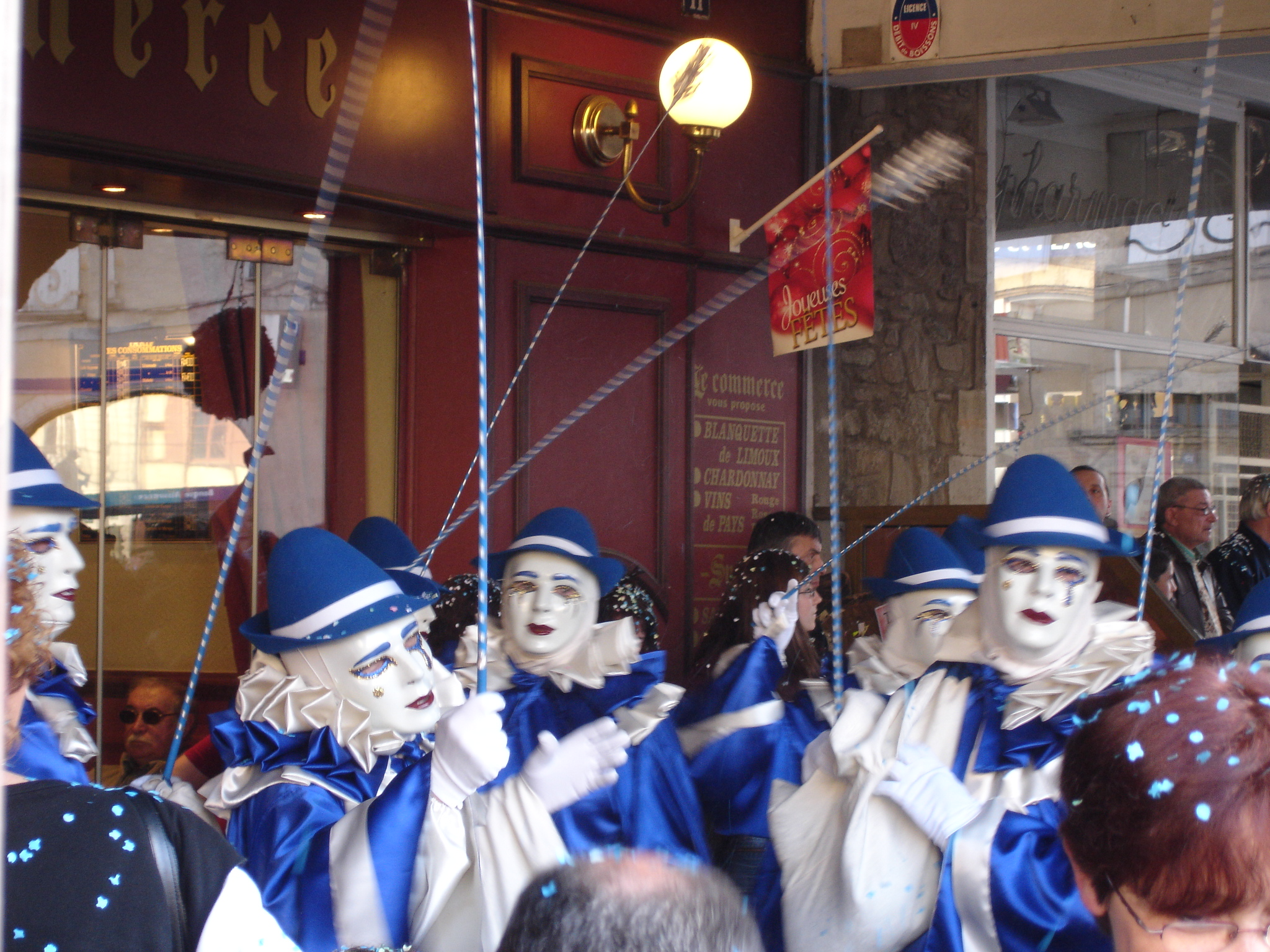
Characteristic scene

== Bibliography ==
- D. Fabre and Charles Camberoque: La Fête en Languedoc
- Georges Chaluleau and J.Luc Eluard: Le carnaval de limoux, Atelier du Gué Ed.
- Georges Chaluleau: Carnaval de Limoux au cœur (141 pp), Loubatières Ed. ISBN 2-86266-402-2
