= Jardin aux Plantes la Bouichère =

Botanical garden in Languedoc-Roussillon, France

Coordinates: 43.0692°N 2.2230°E

This park is listed on their website as closed since 2017. The Jardin aux Plantes la Bouichère (2 hectares) was a private botanical garden specializing in fragrant plants. It was located on the banks of the river Aude in the Domaine de Flassian, Rue Dewoitine, Limoux, Aude, Languedoc-Roussillon, France, and open Wednesday through Sunday in the warmer months; an admission fee is charged.

The garden was created circa 2001, and now contains some 2,500 perennials, shrubs, and trees, with a focus on aromatic plants, including 60 types of salvia and 30 types of mint. The garden is organized into a number of small areas: an exotic garden, garden of colors, vegetable garden, rose garden, moon garden, medieval garden, orchard, nursery, and vineyard. It also contains a collection of conifers and grasses, as well as an aviary of birds from Australia, Asia, and South America.

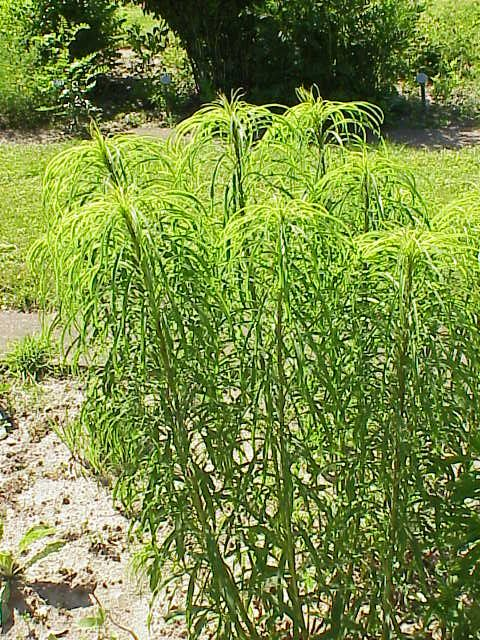
Jardin aux Plantes la Bouichère

== See also ==
- List of botanical gardens in France
