= Ondenc =

Variety of grape

- Grape (Vitis)
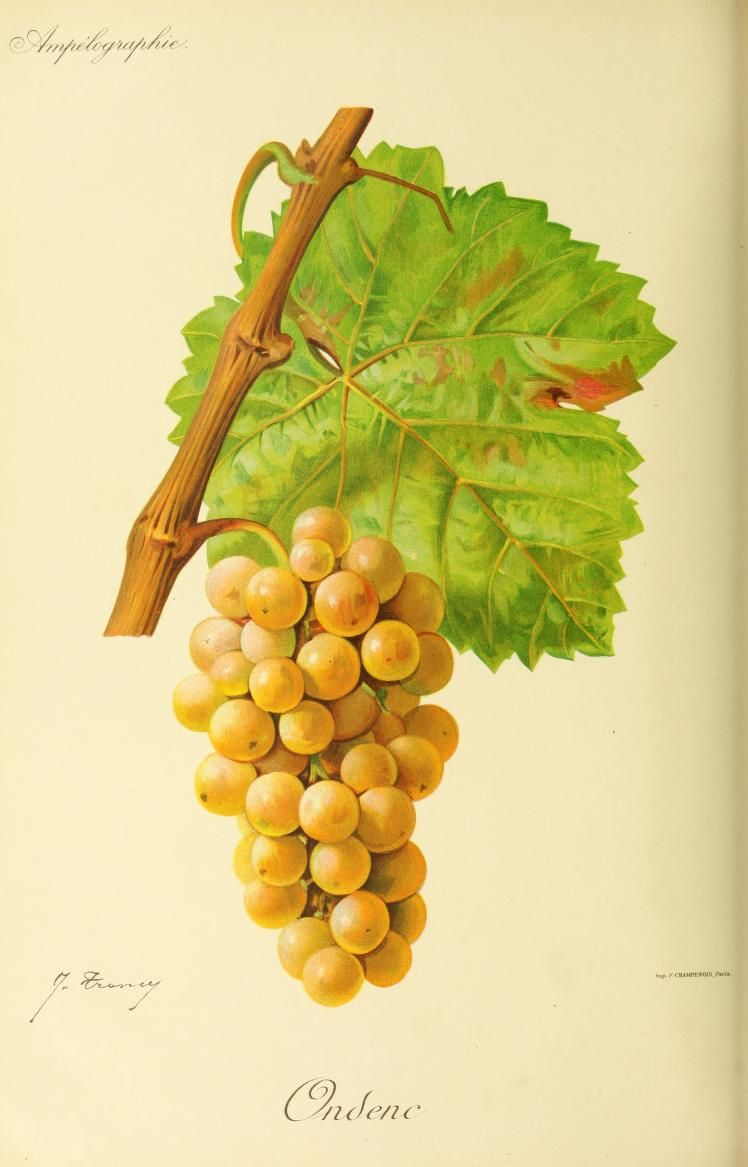
- Color of berry skin: Blanc
- Species: Vitis vinifera
- Also called: see list of synonyms
- Origin: France
- VIVC number: 8770

Ondenc is a white French wine grape found predominantly in the Gaillac region of southwest France. In the 19th century, it was a popular planting in Bordeaux but fell out of favor following the phylloxera epidemic due to poor yields and sensitivity to grape disease, though is still one of the seven white varieties permitted in Bordeaux. Prior to falling out of favor, vine cuttings were brought from Bordeaux to Australia where the grapes became known under the synonyms of Irvine's White in Victoria and Sercial in South Australia. The Australian grapes weren't identified as Ondenc till 1976 when French ampelographer Paul Truel identified the vine while visiting Australia. Today, the grape is nearly extinct in Australia except for a small amount of plantings in Victoria used in sparkling wine production.

== History ==
The grape is believed to have originated in southwestern France and at its peak production it was grown as far north as the Côtes-de-Blaye region and as far south as the foothills of the Pyrenees. In the early 19th century, Ondenc vines were taken to the Cognac region where the grape was known as Blanc Sélection Carrière. From Cognac, cuttings spread to California and Portugal. Ondenc cuttings, known as Blanc Select, were also among the grape varieties that James Busby brought to Australia in 1832. At the turn of the 20th century, plantings of Ondenc declined worldwide and in France it was soon limited to the Gaillac region and the Appellation d'origine contrôlée (AOC) regions of Bergerac, Côtes de Duras and Montravel.

== Wine ==
The Ondenc grape can produce a highly perfumed, full-bodied wine. It is also high in acidity which lends itself well to the production of sparkling wine.

== Synonyms ==
Synonyms of Ondenc include Austenq, Béquin, Bergeracois, Blanc de Gaillac, Blanc Select, Blanc Selection Carrière, Blanquette, Blanquette Sucrée, Chaloche, Chalosse, Cu de Brecherou, Doudant Blanc, Doundent, Dourec, Dourech, Fronsadais, Gaillac, Irvine's White, Mauzac, Œil de Tour, Ondain, Ondainc, Ondent, Ondin, Oundenc, Oundenq, Oustenc, Oustenq, Oustenque, Piquepout de Moissac, Plant de Gaillac, Prendiou, Prentiou, Primai, Primaic, Primard, Printiou, Riverain, Sable Blanc, Semis Blanc, Sencit Blanc, Sensit Blanc, and Sercial.
