= Limoux wine =

Type of French wine

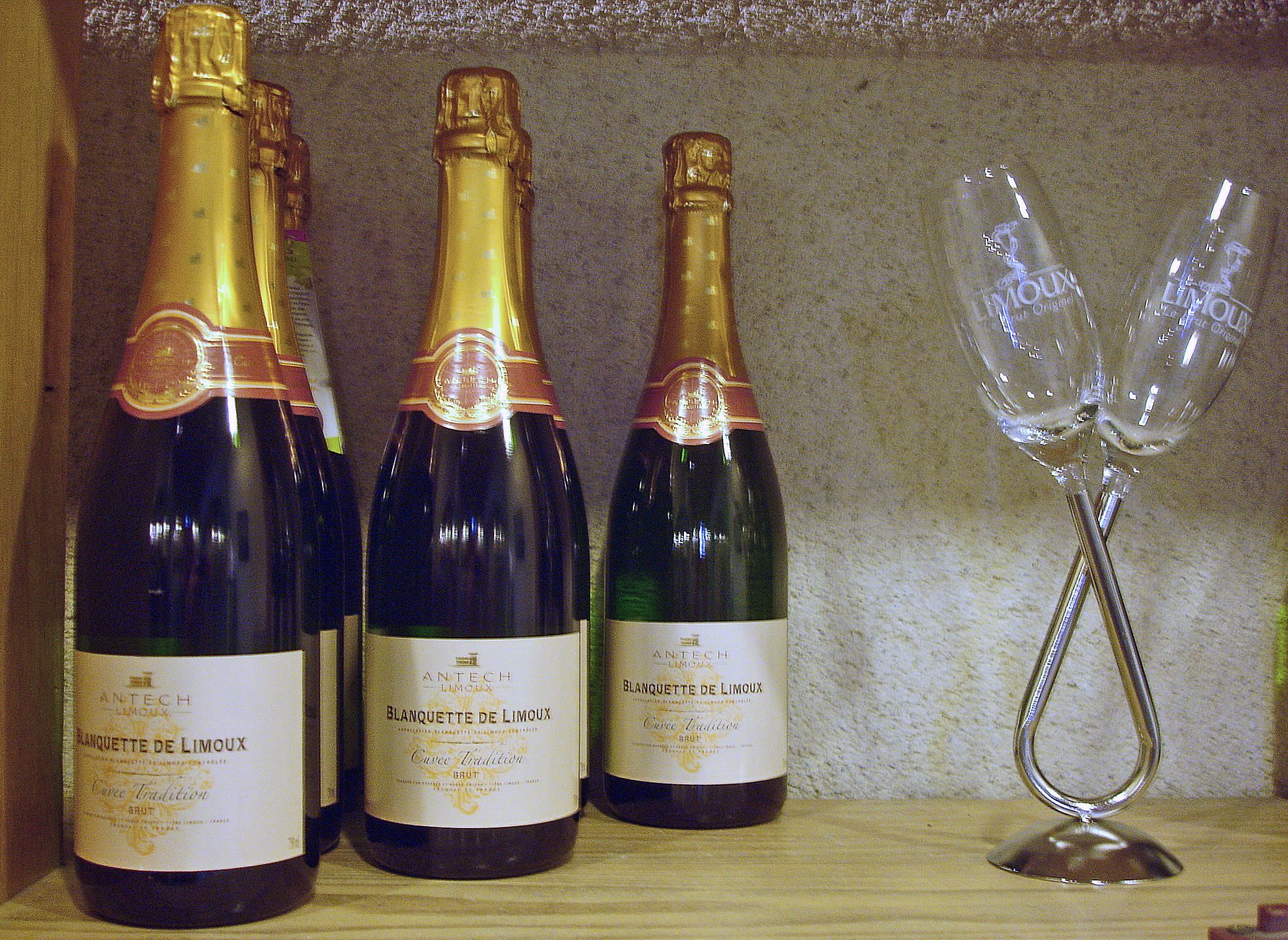
Bottles of Blanquette de Limoux

Limoux wine (Occitan: vin de Limós) is produced around Limoux in Languedoc in southwestern France. Limoux wine is produced under four Appellation d'origine contrôlée (AOC) designations: Blanquette de Limoux, Blanquette méthode ancestrale, Crémant de Limoux and Limoux, the first three of which are sparkling wines and dominate the production around Limoux. The region's main grape is the Mauzac, locally known as Blanquette, followed by Chardonnay and Chenin blanc. In 2005, the Limoux AOC was created to include red wine production, mostly Merlot. Wine historians believe the world's first sparkling wine was produced in this region in 1531 by the monks at the abbey in Saint-Hilaire.

== Climate and geography ==
The Limoux wine region is located in the eastern foothills of the Pyrénées in southern France, south of the fortified city of Carcassonne. The classified vineyards are all in the Aude département, in the vicinity of Limoux, west of the Corbières hills. The climate is dominated by the strong winds of the region, the dry Atlantic vent cers, and the warm Mediterranean vent marin. The Mediterranean climate has more Atlantic influences than other Languedoc wine regions. The soil in the area is rocky with clay, sandstone, and limestone, creating distinct terroir throughout the region depending on the degree of Mediterranean or Atlantic influences and clay composition.

The region's unique topography and the combination of Mediterranean and Atlantic influences have created ideal conditions for the slow, even ripening of the region's white wine grapes. Despite being located at a southerly latitude, the climate is cooler and warmer than most wine regions in southern France. Its location in the foothills of the Pyrénées allows the vineyards to be at a higher elevation and planted in optimal locations on hillsides.

== History ==
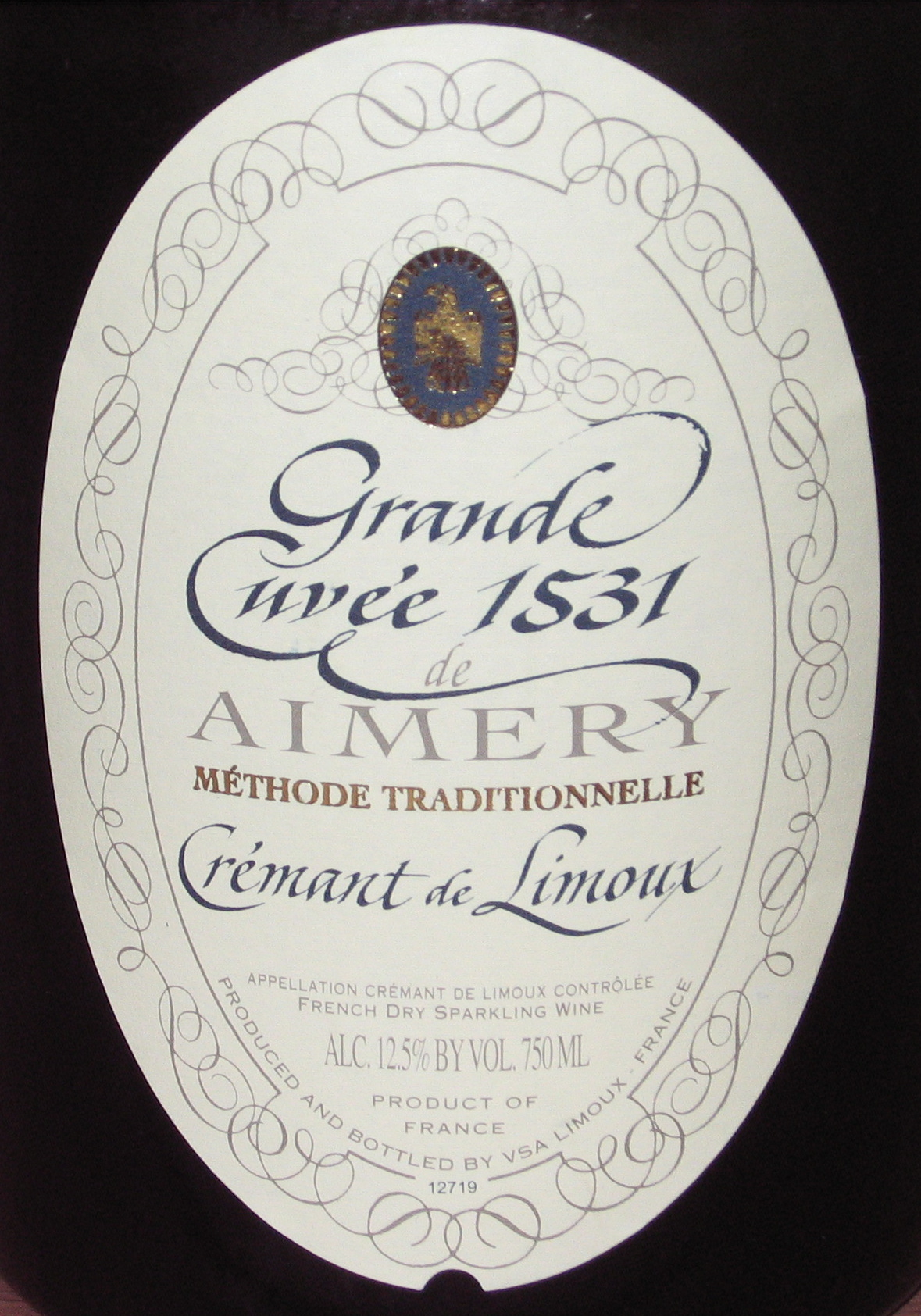
The Limoux area is described as the oldest sparkling wine region in the world. This Crémant de Limoux has been named after the year the first sparkling wines were mentioned – 1531.

Records show that Livy traded in non-sparkling white wines from Limoux as far back as the Roman occupation of the region.

Blanquette de Limoux is considered to be the first sparkling white wine produced in France, created long before the Champagne region became world-renowned for the sparkling wine Champagne. The first textual mention of "blanquette," from the Occitan expression for "the small white," appeared in 1531 in papers written by Benedictine monks at an abbey in Saint-Hilaire. They detail the production and distribution of Saint-Hilaire's blanquette in cork-stoppered flasks. The region's location, north of the cork oak forest of Catalunya, gave Limoux producers easy access to the material needed to produce secondary fermentation in the flask, which produces the bubbles necessary for sparkling wine.

Local lore suggests that Dom Pérignon learned to produce sparkling white wine while serving in this abbey before moving to the Champagne region and popularizing the drink. However, this is almost certainly false since Dom Pérignon was involved with improving Champagne's still wines, not the sparkling ones.

In 1938, Blanquette de Limoux became one of the first AOCs established in the Languedoc region (1936 AOCs included Muscat de Frontignan in the Languedoc and Rivesaltes, Maury, and Banyuls in the Roussillon). While the classification is recent, the wine has long been a traditional apéritif or dessert accompaniment in the area.

In recent decades, appellation rules have been relaxed to allow an increased use of international grape varieties, which have partially replaced Mauzac.

== Grapes ==
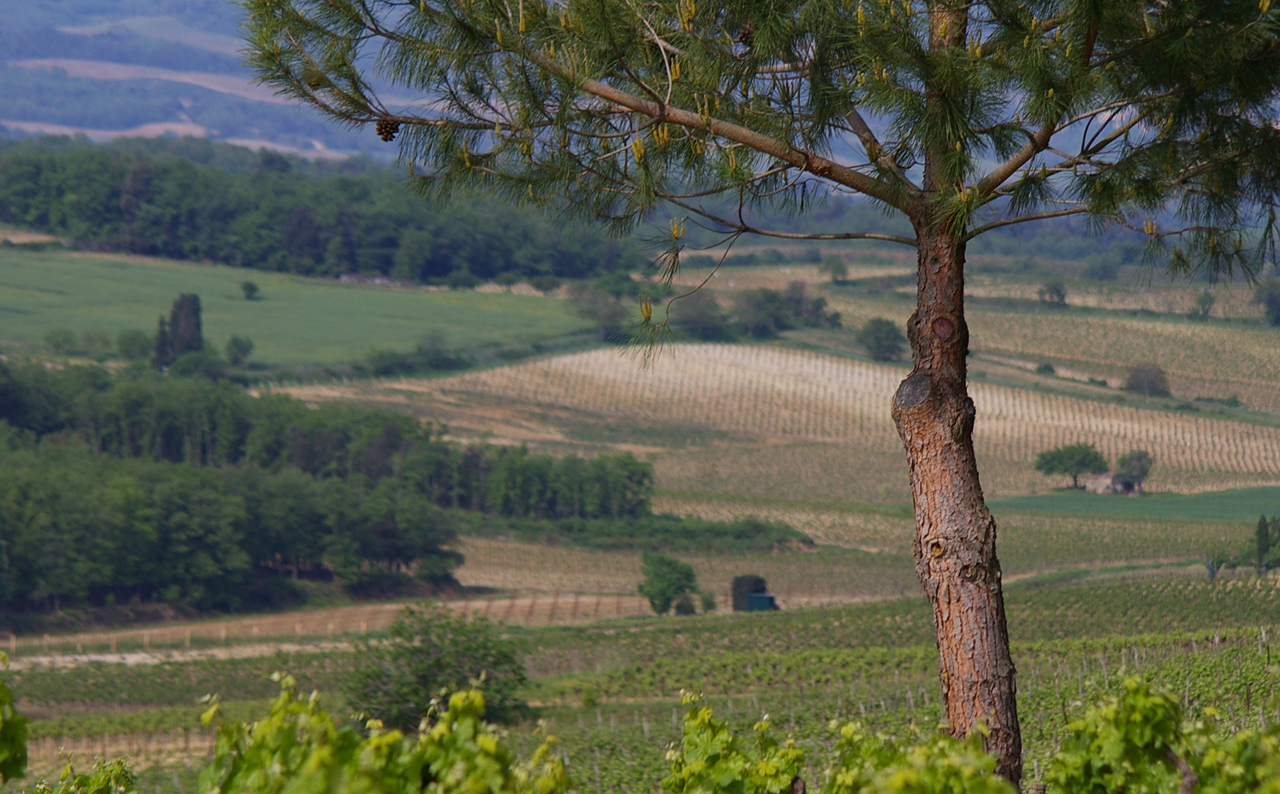
Limoux vineyard

The main grape of the Limoux region is the Mauzac grape, which produces a rustic wine with a characteristic apple-peel flavor reminiscent of sweet apple cider. The grape is declining in worldwide plantings, with Southwest France being one of the few places where Mauzac has a lasting presence. The use of Chardonnay and Chenin blanc is growing partly due to the more internationally recognized flavors of both grapes. The 1980s saw an increase in the plantings and popularity of Chardonnay. Limoux winemakers began developing a unique style of still wines made from Chardonnay and fermented in oak barrels, sold as Vin de pays. The reputation of these Chardonnay wines grew to where they are regarded as some of the best examples of French Chardonnay outside Burgundy. Barrel samplings were featured at the yearly Toques et Clochers charity auction modeled after the famous Hospices de Beaune. Prices of these Vins de pays soon exceeded what the French authorities thought was appropriate for this low classification, and in 1993, the Limoux AOC was revised to include the still wines made from Chardonnay. While made mainly of Chardonnay, these wines are permitted to include Chenin blanc and must consist of a minimum of 15% Mauzac.

The red wines of the Limoux AOC are composed of at least 50% Merlot with Carignan, Grenache, Malbec (known locally as Côt), and Syrah, making up at least 30% of the blend. Carignan is limited to a maximum of 10% as a component from the 2010 vintage. Cabernet Sauvignon and Cabernet Franc are also grown in the area and are restricted to a maximum of 20% together in red Limoux AOC wines. They are, however, also used in the Vin de pays wines sold as Vin de pays de la Haute Vallée de l'Aude.

== Blanquette de Limoux ==
The name Blanquette de Limoux has been used for a long time for the sparkling wines from Limoux. The word blanquette is borrowed from blanqueto, which means "small white" in the local Occitan language. Blanquette de Limoux can contain three grape varieties: Mauzac (which must constitute a minimum of 90% of the wine), Chardonnay, and Chenin blanc. Before the 1990 introduction of the Crémant de Limoux AOC, the use of Mauzac was optional. The change to the mandatory minimum of 90% Mauzac in the AOC regulations of Blanquette de Limoux was seen as a safeguard in maintaining the traditional style of Blanquette de Limoux and preserving the use of the local Mauzac grape, which is declining in worldwide plantings. This Mauzac-based wine tastes unique, with apple flavors and distinctive aromas of fresh-cut grass that can be identified in blind tastings. Wine writer Tom Stevenson notes a change in the profile of recent vintages with wines that are "developing finer, more flowery, autolytic aromas." The grape varieties are vinified separately before being assembled and bottled. Just before bottling, a tirage is added to the blend so that a second fermentation will take place in the bottle. The carbon dioxide produced during this second fermentation is trapped in the bottle, giving the wine its effervescence. After nine months, the bottles are opened and disgorged before a final corking.

== Blanquette méthode ancestrale ==
The wine that the St-Hilaire monks invented in 1531 was Vin de Blanquette and the méthode rurale wine became a separate AOC known as Blanquette méthode ancestrale. Today, this AOC is used for a sweetish sparkling wine made in a more old-fashioned way, without disgorgement. It is produced in the same area as Blanquette de Limoux and may only contain Mauzac. Due to the absence of disgorgement, these wines are generally very cloudy, with particles of the sediment of dead yeast cells, known as lees, still present in the wine. The winemaking method used to make Blanquette méthode ancestrale is also known as the méthode gaillacoise and is used to make the sparkling Mousseux wine of the Gaillac AOC. This method involves traditional hand-crafted winemaking, with minimum use of modern technology such as stainless-steel fermentation tanks. The resulting wines are typically low in alcohol (often less than 7% by volume), with sweet apple-like flavors and a slight sparkling fizz.

Bottling of this wine traditionally occurred on a day of astrological significance.

== Crémant de Limoux ==
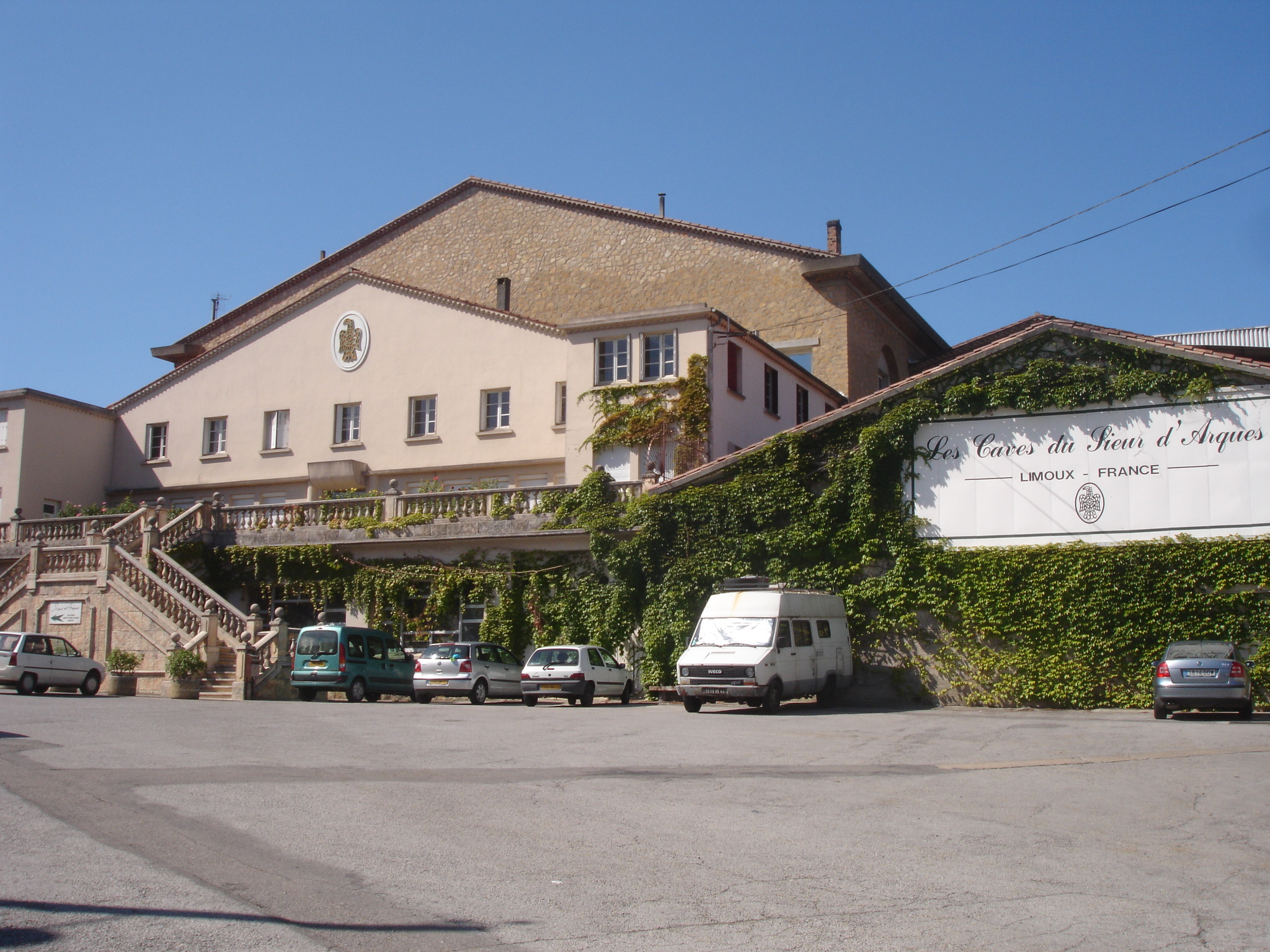
Winemaking cooperative Sieur d'Arques, the largest winery in Limoux

When the term Crémant was introduced for non-Champagne sparkling wines in France, an AOC for more "modern" or internationally styled sparkling wines was created in 1990. The origin of that decision occurred a year earlier, in 1989, when the producers of Limoux had to decide whether or not they wanted to maintain the traditional makings of Blanquette de Limoux based on Mauzac or relax the AOC regulations to allow the introduction of more Chenin blanc and Chardonnay to create internationally recognized flavors. Limoux producers were split on what direction they wanted to go, so the provisional appellation of Crémant de Limoux was introduced to allow the producers to make whichever style of sparkling wine they preferred and still sell it under an AOC designation. A deadline was set in 1994 for the least used AOC designation to be phased out; still, the deadline passed without Crémant de Limoux or Blanquette de Limoux making significant progress, and both AOCs continue to co-exist today. These Crémant de Limoux wines differ primarily from Blanquette de Limoux in their grape composition, with Chardonnay and Chenin blanc as the main varieties. Together, they are not to exceed 90% of the wines. For Chenin blanc, a minimum of 20% and a maximum of 40% must be used. Mauzac and Pinot noir are accessory grape varieties and may not exceed 20%; Pinot noir itself does not exceed 10%. This, Crémant de Limoux contains 40–70% Chardonnay, 20–40% Chenin blanc, 0–20% Mauzac and 0–10% Pinot noir. AOC regulations dictate that the wine be aged for at least a year on the lees before disgorgement. Over 40 villages around Limoux are permitted to make Crémant de Limoux.

== Limoux ==
Before 1993, the only non-sparkling still wine that Limoux producers could make under an AOC designation was Mauzac. The growing popularity and high prices of Vin de pays still wines made from Chardonnays prompted the French authorities to revise the Limoux appellation. Varietal versions of Chardonnay and Chenin blanc were permitted, but all white wines must contain a minimum of 15% Mauzac. European Union regulations dictate that a varietal wine must contain at least 85% of the variety listed on the wine label; hence, most Limoux AOC white wines are typically two grape blends-85% of the main variety, like Chardonnay and 15% Mauzac. Producers that wished to make a 100% Chardonnay wine or one without Mauzac, have to produce their wines as Vin de Pays d'Oc, with E & J Gallo Winery's Red Bicyclette being one of the more notable examples being made primarily with Chardonnay grapes from the Limoux region. The Limoux AOC was the first AOC to regulate mandatory barrel fermentation for its white wine.

The appellation was approved for the production of red varietal wines starting with the 2003 vintage. These wines must contain a minimum of 50% Merlot with Grenache, Malbec, and Syrah. Carignan is permitted at a maximum of 10% of the blend until 2010 when the variety is expected to be phased out completely of Limoux production. Altogether, at least 3 grape varieties must be in the blend, with no two single varieties exceeding 90% of the total blend. In recent years, the Limoux AOC has seen significant investment by negociants, cooperatives, and larger French wine estates, like Baroness Philippine de Rothschild of Château Mouton Rothschild, who see potential in the red wines from this traditionally sparkling white wine region.

=== Grape composition ===
The AOC specifies the following rules for the varietal composition of Limoux AOC wine:

- White wine can be made from Mauzac, Chardonnay, and Chenin blanc, with a minimum of 15% Mauzac.
- Red wine can be made from Merlot, Cabernet Franc, Cabernet Sauvignon, Grenache, Malbec (under the name Cot), Syrah, and Carignan. The wine must be a blend containing a minimum of three varieties, with no two varieties together exceeding 90% of the blend. Furthermore, Merlot must make up a minimum of 50%, and Grenache, Malbec, Syrah, and Carignan must make up a minimum of 30%. However, from the 2010 harvest, Carignan may not exceed 10%.

=== Wine styles ===
The white still wines of the Limoux AOC vary depending on the primary grape. Mauzac adds a zesty acidity and requires time in the bottle before some more subtle, floral flavors emerge. Wines that Chardonnay dominates are more approachable in their youth and tend to have a rich, whole body with lemon and oak flavors.

== Carnival ==
Limoux celebrates its historic wines with a historic carnival, the longest in the world, according to the locals, lasting from the end of January till April, when it ends in the celebration known as la nuit de la blanquette, the evening of the blanquette wine.

== See also ==
- List of appellations in Languedoc-Roussillon
- Dom Pérignon
- Crémant de Loire
