= Gaillac AOC =

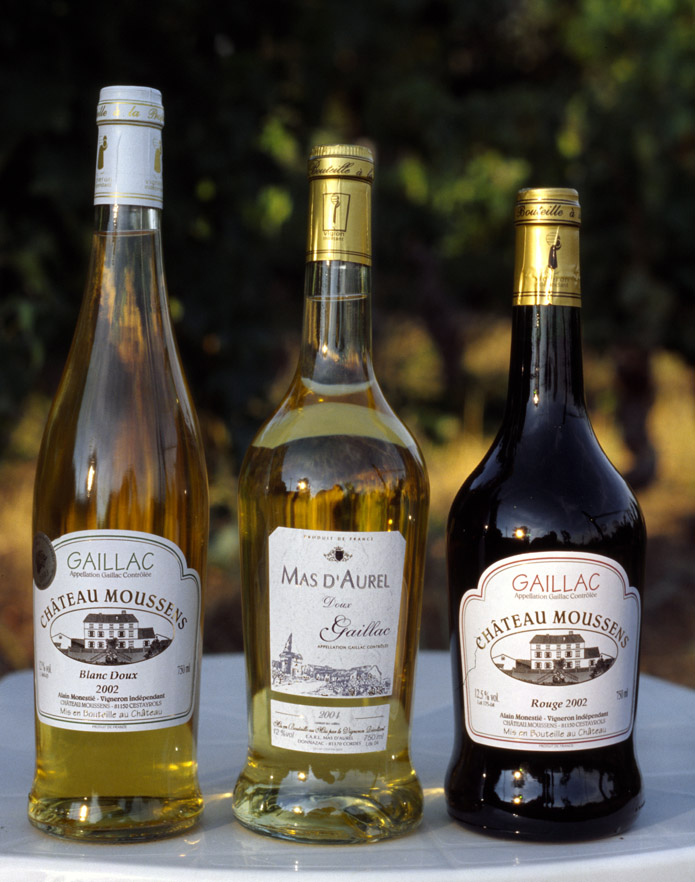
Three bottles of Gaillac wine

Gaillac AOC (French pronunciation: [ɡajak]; Occitan: Galhac AOC) is an Appellation d'Origine Contrôlée (AOC) in South West France in the département of Tarn, just north of Toulouse.

== History ==
The region makes claims to be among the earliest viticultural centres of ancient Gaul, though possibly after those of Languedoc around Narbonne, with wine production established in early 1st century. Roman merchants transported wine to Bordeaux and Northern Europe down the Tarn, and vineyards soon followed in the valley. Archaeologists have found Roman pottery in Montans.

The town of Gaillac grew up around the Benedictine monastery of Saint Michael, in the Tenth Century. As elsewhere, vineyards flourished in the care of the monks, who needed wine for religious purposes. By 1253, Gaillac was exporting its wine to England again, when Henry III bought 20 barrels. In 1387, the Counts of Toulouse granted Gaillac the right to put a rooster on the barrel in recognition of their wine, and le coq gaillacois continues in use as the town's emblem. King Francois I of France gave King Henry VIII 50 barrels of Gaillac red wine at the Field of the Cloth of Gold summit in 1520. Local lore in the region of Cunac claims that the gift came from the vineyard there.

The town's fortunes declined through several centuries, and only started to recover in the years after the Great War. Its white wines were awarded protected status in 1937 and the reds in 1970.

== Wines ==
- The traditional red wines of the region are considered able to be kept for 8–10 years. They are made of the grape varieties Cabernet Franc, Cabernet Sauvignon, Duras, Fer Servadou or Syrah. On the Gaillac terroir, the variety Fer Servadou is known as Braucol. Rosé is made from the same grapes.
- "Primeur" red wine is made for drinking young, it's a marketing scheme based on Beaujolais Nouveau. The template is followed so closely that primeur wines must be made from the Gamay grape and are released for sale on the third Thursday of November.
- The white wines are made of Mauzac, Sauvignon blanc or Muscadelle, Len de l'El and Ondenc, local grape varieties. Table wines, dessert wines and sparkling wines are all made.

== Production ==
The vineyards cover 4,200 hectares (10,000 acres). The production is between 110 and 150,000 hl of red wine, 45–60,000 hl of white wine, and 20,000 hl of rosé.

== Wineries ==
Renowned wineries include Domaine Croix des Marchands, Château Palvié, Domaine Barreau, Domaine Vayssette, Domaine d'Escausses, Château Clement Termes, Château de Saurs.

== See also ==
- Cahors AOC - a similar wine producing appellation on the river Lot to the north
- List of Vins de Primeur
- Tourism in Tarn
