= Mauzac =

Variety of grape

- Grape (Vitis)
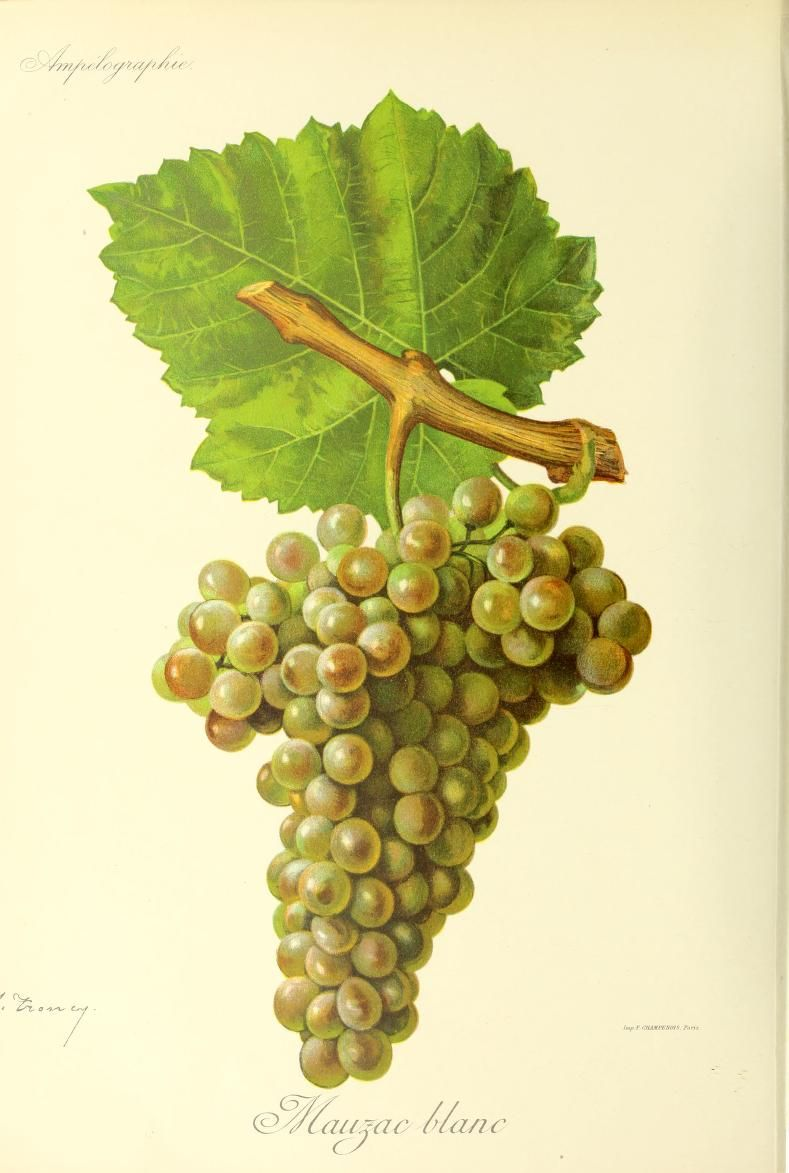
- Mauzac in Viala & Vermorel
- Color of berry skin: Blanc
- Species: Vitis vinifera
- Also called: Blanquette et cetera
- Origin: South West France
- Notable regions: Gaillac, Limoux
- Notable wines: Blanquette de Limoux
- VIVC number: 7522

Mauzac or Mauzac blanc is a white variety of grape used for wine, of the species Vitis vinifera. It is mainly grown in the Gaillac and Limoux regions in southwest France. Total French plantations of Mauzac stood at 3,200 hectares (7,900 acres) in the year 2000.

Gaillac's aromatic wines are blended with Len de l'El to create mildly sweet and sparkling white blended wines. Since the late 1980s, some Gaillac producers have created an interest in Mauzac by producing better wines. In Limoux, Mauzac is a compulsory part of the Blanquette de Limoux, where it may be blended with Chenin blanc and Chardonnay. However, in Limoux, plantations of Mauzac are decreasing as it is losing ground to Chardonnay. The grape is also one of the seven permitted white varieties in Bordeaux wine.

Mauzac buds and ripens late, and was traditionally picked quite late, when temperatures had dropped in Limoux. This allowed for slow fermentation preserving residual sugar for a "natural" second fermentation in the spring, creating a sparkling wine. Today, it is more common to pick Mauzac earlier, giving a more crisp wine with higher acidity, but also without much of its particular aromas.

== Other colors ==
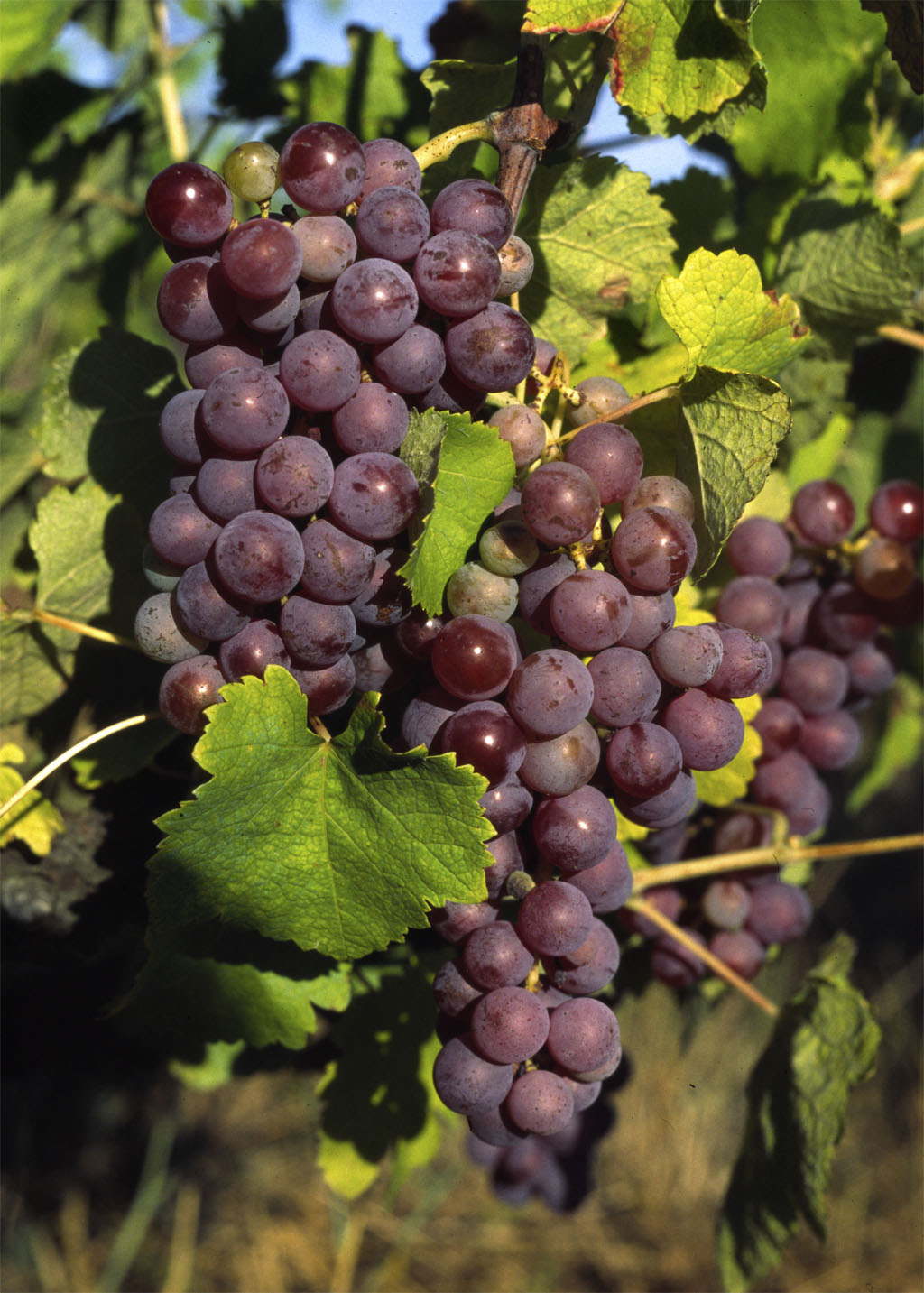
Mauzac Rose grapes

While Mauzac almost always refers to Mauzac blanc there are also Mauzac varieties with other skin colors; Mauzac rose and Mauzac noir. Both of these are very rare in cultivation. While Mauzac rose is a color mutation of Mauzac blanc, Mauzac noir is a distinct variety whose relationship to Mauzac is unclear. Some further distinguish other variants of Mauzac blanc, including Mauzac vert (green Mauzac), Mauzac roux (russet Mauzac), and Mauzac jaune (yellow Mauzac).

== Synonyms ==
Mauzac blanc, or wine made with substantial proportions of it, is known under the following synonyms: Aiguillon, Becquin, Bekin, Bequin, Blanc Lafitte, Blanquette, Blanquette Aventice, Blanquette de Limoux, Blanquette Sucrée, Caspre, Clairac, Feuille Ronde, Gaillac, Gaillade, Gamet blanc, Manzac, Maousac, Mausac, Maussac, Mauza, Mauza blanca, Meauzac, Moisac, Moissac, Moysac, Mozac, Mozak Belyi, Peron, Perrond, Pied Rond, Plant de Gaillac, Primard, Queue Fort, Queue Roide, and Sudunais.
