= Premature oxidation =

Premature oxidation, (sometimes shortened to premox, or POx) is a flaw that occurs in white wines, when the presumably ageworthy wine is expected to be in good condition yet is found to be oxidised and often undrinkable. In particular the affliction has received attention in connection to incidents of whites produced in Burgundy. The afflicted vintages are predominantly from the late 1990s, and in particular those of 96, 97 and 98, until 2002. There have also been reports of premature oxidation occurring in wines from Australia, Alsace, Germany, and Bordeaux.

== Hypotheses ==
Clive Coates, MW has stated that "Poorly-performing corks are the main culprits behind prematurely aged white Burgundy", while Pierre Rovani of The Wine Advocate has stated the contrary, "corks are not the issue". Allen Meadows has speculated that "based on what we know today, the most likely source of the problem is cork-related, though it appears this has been exacerbated by generally lower levels of SO_{2}", while Steve Tanzer believes it to be a combination of several factors that involve corks, global warming resulting in overripe fruit, excessive stirring of the lees, and insufficient use of sulfur dioxide. Roger Boulton, professor of UC Davis, agreed with the probability of multifactorial causality, stating, "there are likely to be both closure issues and wine chemistry issues, so looking for the [single] answer will be like missing the bus".

The French oenologists Denis Dubourdieu and Valérie Lavigne-Cruege launched a theory that with the recent trends of abstaining from the use of herbicides and letting grass grow freely in the vineyards of Burgundy, the grass competing with vines for water in conjunction with a warm vintage may cause the vines to endure extreme stress. As a result, grapes grown on highly stressed vines may have insufficient quantities of glutathione, a compound that functions as an essential antioxidant during the fermentation process.

According to Michel Bettane, Burgundy producers reacted by taking steps to address the possible causes by heightened scrutiny of cork quality, more awareness of possible sulfur dioxide insufficiency, and a decrease of the practice of batonnage, the stirring of the lees that adds richness to the wines but also increases oxygen contact.

In December 2006, Jamie Goode published an analysis of the problem of premature oxidation in The World of Fine Wine and explores some possible solutions.

== Organic winemaking ==
Premature oxidation is a risk in organic winemaking, in which a lowered sulfite content is stipulated. Use of bâtonnage is known to increase premature oxidation.
