= Peter Liem =

American wine critic

Peter Liem is an American wine critic, a senior correspondent for Wine & Spirits, and since 2009 the author and publisher of the online subscription guide to wines and producers of Champagne, ChampagneGuide.net, and has co-authored a book on the subject of Sherry. Liem has also contributed to publications such as San Francisco Chronicle, Zester Daily and The World of Fine Wine.

== Career ==
With a background in wine retail, Liem began his career in wine writing when he and Kirk Wille founded a bi-monthly e-magazine titled Riesling Report, which was published from 2000 to 2002. Liem joined Wine & Spirits in 2004 in a capacity as a senior editor and tasting director, and critic covering the wines of Alsace, Austria, Germany and the Loire. In 2006 Liem moved to the Champagne village Dizy, while establishing a reputation as "one of the keenest tasters around". Following the 2009 launch of his subscription website, the guide has been described to expand on works such as 4000 Champagnes by Richard Juhlin and Champagne by Tom Stevenson, and may grow to be for Champagne what Burghound.com is for Burgundy. From November 2007, Liem regularly maintained the blog "Besotted Ramblings and Other Drivel" until October 2009, when he announced he had decided to discontinue this blog due to other projects and time constraints.

Though not claiming to have invented it, Liem was in 2008 commended by Eric Asimov for discovering the word "gob-less" as a term for wines of grace, balance and finesse, in response to the trend among wine critics such as Robert Parker who frequently apply the word "gobs" to describe wines of overwhelming power and fruity sweetness. Similarly in 2009, Asimov expressed appreciation of a Liem column comparing wines made from ungrafted vines with cheese made from unpasteurized milk.

== Published works ==
In October 2012, Liem and co-author Jesús Barquín published the book Sherry, Manzanilla and Montilla: A Guide to the Traditional Wines of Andalucía. Liem has visited the Jerez region regularly since 1998 and began in earnest work on the book during the spring of 2011, eventually in tandem with Sherry expert Barquín, the founder of Equipo Navazos. The two collaborated on the historical and general portrait of the region, while a second part to the book which profiles specific producers remains the exclusive work of Liem, to avoid a conflict of interests as Barquín is himself a producer.

In October 2017 Liem published Champagne: The Essential Guide to the Wines, Producers, and Terroirs of the Iconic Region with Ten Speed Press.

== SherryFest ==
In conjunction with the launch of the book Sherry, Manzanilla and Montilla, Liem and organizer Rosemary Gray arranged the event SherryFest 2012 NYC over four days in October 2012 at various locations in New York City, drawing upon retailer in-store tastings, several educational seminars and producer dinner events, and a sherry tasting with 20 Sherry producers presenting in excess of 130 sherries.

== See also ==
- List of wine personalities
