= Bond (winery) =

Winery in Oakville, California, U.S.

Coordinates: 38.4119°N 122.4110°W

BOND is a Californian winery located in Oakville, California, in the Napa Valley. It was established in 1996 by Bill Harlan of Harlan Estate, and has been run by his son, Will since 2020. The winery lies in close proximity to the family's other wineries, Harlan Estate and Promontory, though its five "crus" (vineyard sites), are spread throughout the Napa Valley.

BOND produced its first wines in 1999 with Melbury and Vecina. Unlike the Harlan Estate wines, which are modelled on the wines of Bordeaux region of France, the BOND wines are made from cabernet sauvignon but inspired by the pinot noir farming and winemaking of Burgundy. Cory Empting has been the winemaker since 2012, though he has been working with the winery since the year 2000. In 2016, the wine critic Robert Parker named 2013 BOND Pluribus on his list of “20 Most Extraordinary Red Wines”.

== Production background ==
The name of the winery is derived from the maiden name of owner Bill Harlan's mother, and is also intended to be symbolic of the "bond" between the Harlan family and their winegrowing partners. The winery typically produces 450-600 cases per vintage of each cru, but the wines are among the most highly sought-after in California. The wines are frequently resold at auctions. and the winery has an 18-36 month-long waiting list of would-be customers.

The winery is part of Harlan's 200-year plan, with the stated intention to “create a first-growth in California”. James Laube, writing about BOND and Harlan in 2002, stated that Harlan had “added a new wrinkle” to his approach to the Napa Cabernet scene. While Harlan Estate is modelled after the prestigious wineries in the Bordeaux region of France, BOND wine is inspired by Burgundy, with a "diverse range of small, varied parcels, intended to showcase terroir on a micro-level", through the lens of 100% cabernet sauvignon.

== The Five "Crus" ==
Though BOND isn't the first winery in the valley to cultivate single-vineyard cabernet sauvignons, it's portfolio of grand cru (vineyard) sites spread across the valley make it unique in the Napa Valley. The five BOND vineyards and their dates of establishment are as follows: Melbury (1999), Vecina (1999), St. Eden (2001), Pluribus (2003) and Quella (2006). Of the roughly 100 candidate vineyards from which Bond purchased grapes over the last 30 years, five made the cut, said director of winemaking Cory Empting. One vineyard has been under trial at BOND for 11 years.

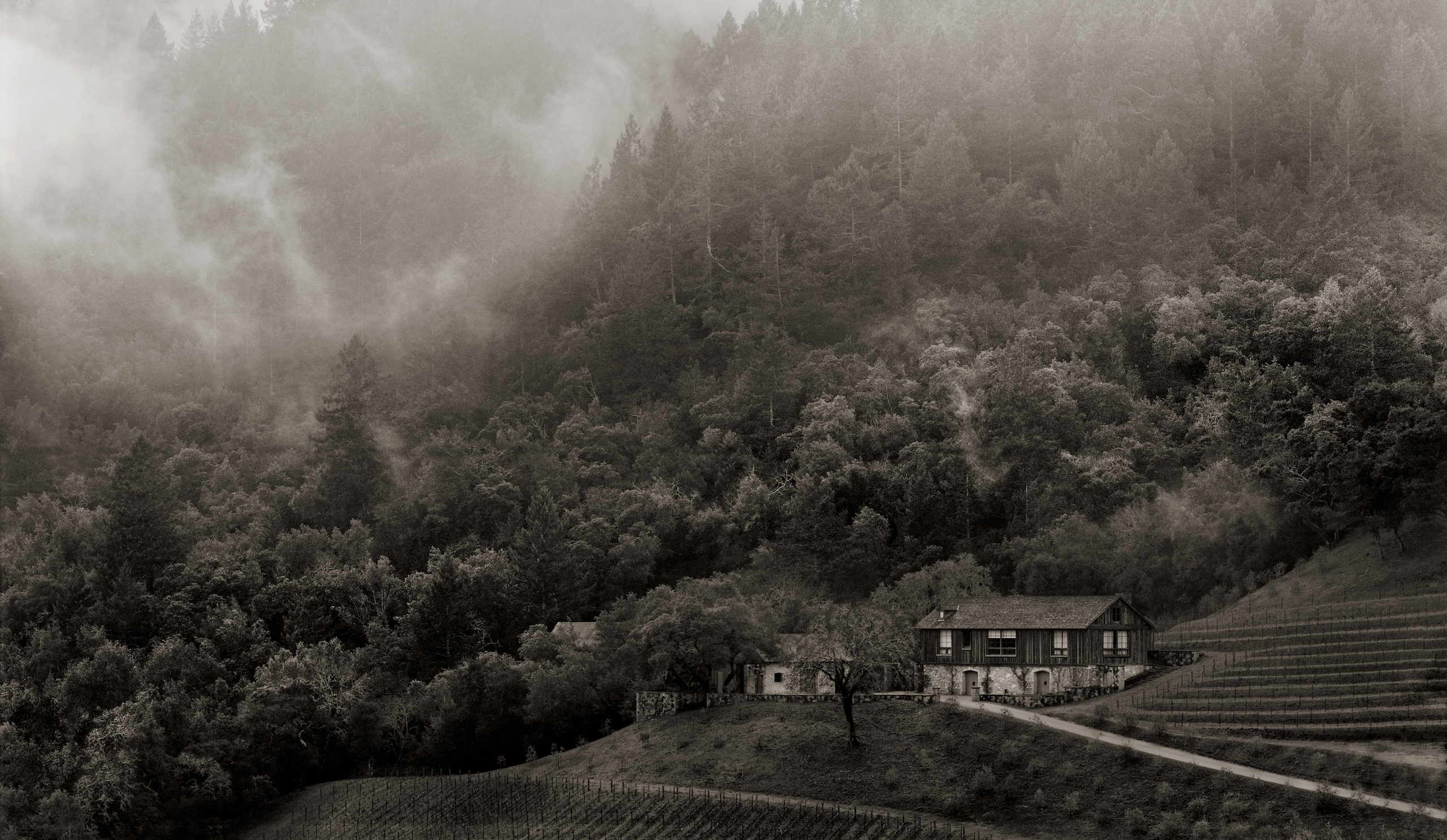
BOND winery

BOND produced its first wines in 1999 with Melbury and Vecina, with 225 cases produces of each. Melbury is named after the Melbury Road area of London and is opposite Pritchard Hill, near Lake Hennessy, on the northeastern side of the valley. Vecina is named after the Spanish word for "neighbor" in Spanish and is an 11 acres (4.5 ha), east-facing vineyard with alluvial soils, and is the nearest to the BOND winery, situated slightly southeast of the Vine Hill Ranch Vineyard.

The 11-acre St. Eden vineyard is situated on a north-facing knoll on the eastern side of the Napa Valley just north of Screaming Eagle. The name "St. Eden" appeared on 19th century maps of the vicinity. It is the lowest- lying of the BOND vineyards, at an elevation of between 145 feet (44 m) and 188 feet (57 m), and has iron-rich red rocky volcanic soils.

The name Quella is a derivative of the German word “quelle”, meaning a "pristine source or artesian aquifer". It lies to the northeast of the valley, to the west of Melbury, and its steep slopes are southwest facing”. The soils contains cobblestone from an ancient riverbed and composed of volcanic ash.

Pluribus is a 7- acre vineyard site on the slopes of Spring Mountain in the northwestern part of the Napa Valley, and the highest of the five BOND sites, at an elevation of over 1,000 feet (300 m). It is named after the Latin word for "many." The Harlan family is searching for a sixth cru to extend the range of the portfolio.

== Reception ==
2019 Vecina is described by the Napa Wine Project as being "deep ruby in color", with "notes of black raspberry, violets and dark cherry". The wine critic Robert Parker of Wine Advocate awarded 2016 BOND Vecina the full 100 points, writing that “this bright, energetic, incredibly nuanced beauty is built like a brick house and, while approachable in its youth, is easily a 50-year wine”.

Antonio Galloni of ‘’Vinous’’ wrote of 2009 BOND Quella: “Mocha, plum, bittersweet chocolate and raspberry jam give the wine its sumptuous, up-front personality. Exotic, ripe and racy to the core, the 2009 is a true joy to taste today.” James Suckling of ‘’Wine Spectator’’ awarded 2019 Quella 99 points, calling it “wonderfully polished and powdered”, and noting its “blackcurrants, stone and conifer” and “fine, velvety tannins”.

Robert Parker awarded 2001 BOND St. Eden a full 100 points, describing it as “perfect” and a “remarkably perfumed nose of crushed rocks, subtle barbecue smoke, and again, cedar wood intermixed with crème de cassis and blackberry”. Antonio Galloni wrote of 2008 St. Eden: “Black cherry, grilled herbs, tobacco, scorched earth and licorice all develop in the glass. Firm tannins suggest the 2008 will drink well for another decade plus.“

Parker awarded 2002 BOND Melbury a full 100 points, describing it as an “extraordinary aromatic profile of smoky meats intermixed with blackberry, crème de cassis, charcoal, lead pencil shavings and espresso“. Galloni wrote that the 2013 Melbury had a “striking vibrancy”, with black cherry, plum, mocha, pine, sage and crushed rocks”.

Lisa Perrotti-Brown of ‘’Wine Advocate’’ awarded 2015 Pluribus a full 100 points, describing it as “Big, rich, bold and decadent” and “deep purple-black colored with minted cassis, pencil shavings and tobacco over a core of black plums, black berry preserves and mulberries plus hints of Chinese five spice and dried lavender”. In 2016, Robert Parker named 2013 BOND Pluribus on his list of “20 Most Extraordinary Red Wines”. Galloni described 2014 Pluribus as “super-refined, sexy and polished”, noting its “bright floral notes, blueberry jam, spice, mint and lavender”.
