= David Schildknecht =

American wine critic

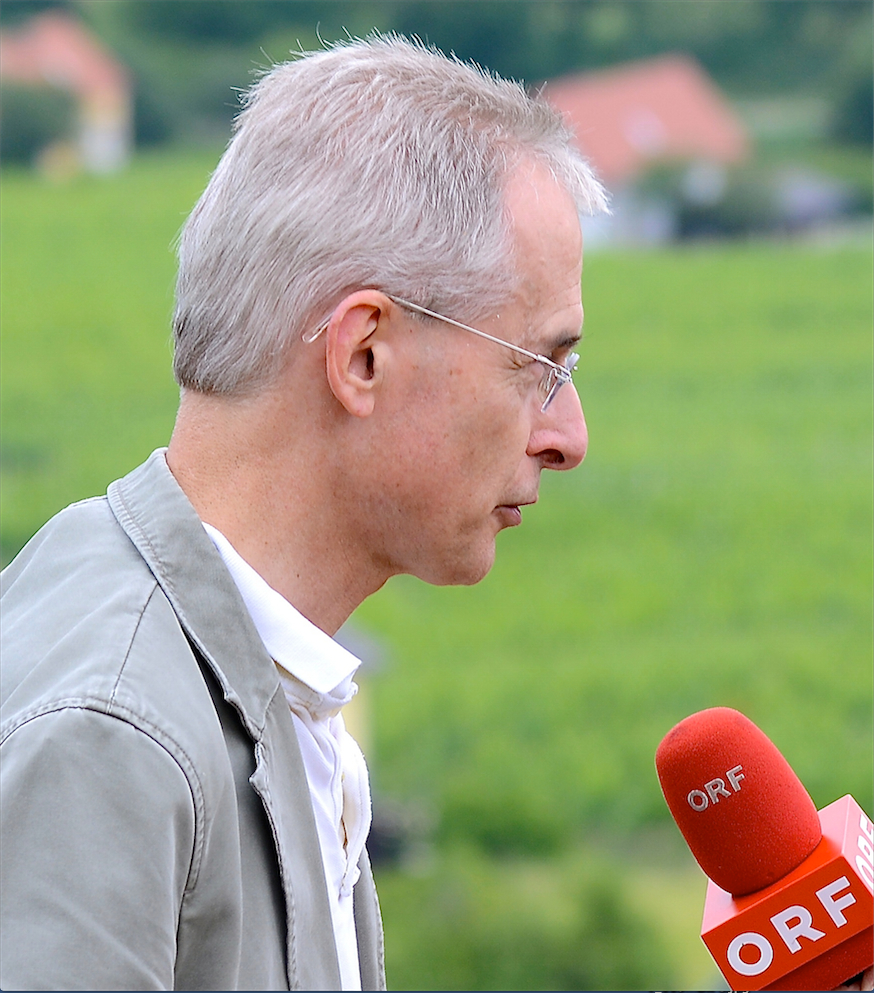
David Schildknecht

David Schildknecht is an American wine critic, a full-time member of "Vinous", and previous member of The Wine Advocate, contributor to recent editions of Robert Parker's Wine Buyer’s Guide. An authority on the wine of Germany and Austria, he also considers the Loire Valley a specialty, a wine region he has described as "the bargain garden of France". He currently covers the French regions of the Loire Valley, Alsace, Beaujolais, Burgundy, Champagne, the Jura, the Savoie and (through calendar 2013) the Languedoc-Roussillon, as well as Austria, Germany and other central Europe wine producing regions, and additionally Oregon, the American East Coast and Midwest wines.

Schildknecht - who worked in Washington DC with Rex Wine & Spirits from 1981, with Mayflower Wine and Spirits, and with Pearson's - regularly assembled and presented wines from German growers for Parker's reports in The Wine Advocate from 1990 through 1993. From 1985-1995, he reported from Austria, Germany, selected regions of France and Hungary for Stephen Tanzer's International Wine Cellar. From 1997 to early 2007, when his duties at The Wine Advocate were expanded to include French wines, Schildknecht imported wines of France for Ohio-based wine importer and distributor Vintner Select.

Schildknecht has authored substantial portions of the 7th edition of Robert Parker's Wine Buyer's Guide and Robert Parker's Wine Bargains as well as the material on German wines in the third edition of The Oxford Companion to Wine, and has contributed as feature writer and columnist to Wine & Spirits, The World of Fine Wine, and Austria's Vinaria. On the subject of TCA taint, Schildknecht has presented his views on stoppers on the website of Jancis Robinson.

Eric Asimov has described Schildknecht as "one of the most learned and thoughtful wine writers around".

== See also ==
- List of wine personalities
