= Monica Larner =

Italian wine critic and writer

- Born: November 5, 1970 (age 54); Los Angeles, California
- Education: Boston University; New York University
- Parent: Stevan Larner
- Website: erobertparker.com

Monica Larner is a wine critic and writer based in Rome. She is the Italian Reviewer for The Wine Advocate and eRobertParker.com, the bimonthly wine publication and website founded by wine critic, Robert Parker. She was selected in 2013 by Parker to replace the departing Antonio Galloni.

In 2003, Larner was selected to be the very first dedicated Italian wine editor for Wine Enthusiast. She is also a two-time winner of the Best Young Journalist of the Year (2008, 2010), one of the top honors given out yearly at the VinItaly exposition. In 2012, Larner won Best International Journalist also presented by the Comitato Grandi Cru d'Italia panel at VinItaly. As of 2013, Larner is the only wine journalist to have won one of these top prizes in wine journalism three times.

Through her work at The Wine Advocate, Larner's opinion on Italian wines is often cited by mainstream media publications like Forbes and Newsweek. She has been described by Robert Parker as "...one of the most comprehensive writers of Italian wines out there."

== Early life ==
A Los Angeles native, Larner's family moved to Rome when she was 11 years old for filming of the 1983 World War II television mini-series The Winds of War on which her father, Stevan Larner, worked as the director of photography.

After high school in both Italy and California, Larner earned her undergraduate and graduate degrees in journalism (an MA with a minor in Italian studies) from Boston University and New York University respectively.

== Career ==
Larner began her career working for the Italian daily La Repubblica, followed by four years as a reporter in the Rome bureau of BusinessWeek (her bylines include an in-depth look at the Antinori wine dynasty). She spent two years as a staff writer covering news and Italian wine for Italy Daily, a joint venture with the International Herald Tribune and Corriere della Sera that has since folded.

The next phase of her career was characterized by intense travel for four guidebooks she authored including Living, Studying and Working in Italy and In Love in Italy.

In 1997, Larner's father retired and her parents purchased a 134-acre ranch in Ballard Canyon, Santa Barbara, California. Monica helped to establish the vineyard; selecting clones, setting cordons and pruning vines. Stevan Larner died in a vineyard accident in 2005. Today, Monica's enologist brother Michael manages the family wine venture.

In 2003, Larner was approached by Wine Enthusiast to be the magazine's first Italy-based correspondent and was formally trained to use the 100-point scoring system by Managing Editor Joe Czerwinski. She was among the first American wine writers to bring attention to Italian indigenous grapes and up-and-coming wine regions such as Sicily's Mount Etna. Over the course of the next ten years, her tasting responsibilities grew to 3,000 wines per year (totaling 16,000 published reviews overall) and she was named the magazine's Italian Editor. Before leaving Wine Enthusiast, she published a 185-page special collector's edition dedicated to the wines of Italy.

In 2013, she joined The Wine Advocate team as the Italian reviewer. One of Larner's first changes at the publication was the addition of new regions to The Wine Advocate's "Vintage Chart" that lists the world's most cellar-worthy wines. In addition to Barbaresco, Barolo, Bolgheri, Brunello di Montalcino and Chianti Classico, Larner added Etna, Friuli, Taurasi, Trentino-Alto Adige and Valpolicella to the chart. In August 2013, Larner sparked controversy for refusing to taste the wines of an Italian producer who had used racial slurs against Italy's first African-Italian Minister Cécile Kyenge.

Larner is an active member of the Ordine dei Giornalisti and of Italy's Foreign Press Association community. She is a certified sommelier with the Italian Sommelier Association.

== Awards ==
- Awarded the "Best International Journalist" Silver Grape Leaf three times by the Comitato Grandi Cru d'Italia, an association of 130 top producers.
- Gambero Rosso recognized her as a "Leader of Italian Excellence," a rare achievement for a non-Italian.

== Works ==
- Living, Studying and Working in Italy
- Working & Living France, 2nd (Working & Living – Cadogan)
- Buying a Property: Italy (Buying a Property - Cadogan)
- In Love in Italy: A Traveller's Guide to the Most Romantic Destinations in the Country of Amore
- Wine Enthusiast magazine's Wines of Italy (Special Collector's Edition).

== See also ==
- List of wine personalities
