= The World of Fine Wine =

British quarterly wine magazine

- Cover of the 20th anniversary issue (June 2024)
- Editor: Neil Beckett
- Categories: Wine magazines
- Frequency: Quarterly
- Publisher: New Statesman Media Group
- First issue: May/June 2004
- Country: United Kingdom
- Language: English
- Website: www.worldoffinewine.com
- ISSN: 1743-503X

The World of Fine Wine, abbreviated WFW, is a British quarterly publication for a wealthy audience of wine enthusiasts and collectors. Originally published by Quarto Magazines Ltd, and now published by New Statesman Media Group (formerly Progressive Media International), the first issue was released in June 2004. It has been described as "an up-market Decanter, with longer, more in-depth features, more credible tastings and less advertising". Hugh Johnson describes The World of Fine Wine as "not a consumer magazine, but the first cultural journal of the wine world".

The World of Fine Wine won the 2009 Gourmand World Cookbook Award for Best Wine Magazine in the World. and in September 2010 and 2012 the journal won the Louis Roederer Award for International Wine Publication of the Year.

In July 2015 the magazine digitized its past issues.

== Contributors ==
The editorial team consists of Neil Beckett as editor with Andrew Jefford as contributing editor, David Williams as deputy editor, and Hugh Johnson as editorial advisor.

Among the content contributors are Michael Broadbent MW, Jancis Robinson MW, David Peppercorn MW, Serena Sutcliffe MW, Clive Coates MW, Nicolas Belfrage MW, Jasper Morris MW, James Halliday, Tim Atkin MW, Tom Stevenson, Michel Bettane, Franco Ziliani, Ann C. Noble, Oz Clarke, Tom Cannavan, Jamie Goode, Anthony Rose, Mike Steinberger, Antonio Galloni, Allen Meadows, David Schildknecht, Francois Mauss, Peter Liem, Roger Scruton, Anthony Hanson MW, and Jeannie Cho Lee MW.

In September 2010 The World of Fine Wine launched a weekly online blog updated every Friday, to be written by regular contributors Andrew Jefford, Peter Liem, Margaret Rand, and Bruce Schoenfeld, as well as other guest contributors.
