= Bill Harlan =

American entrepreneur and vintner (born 19400

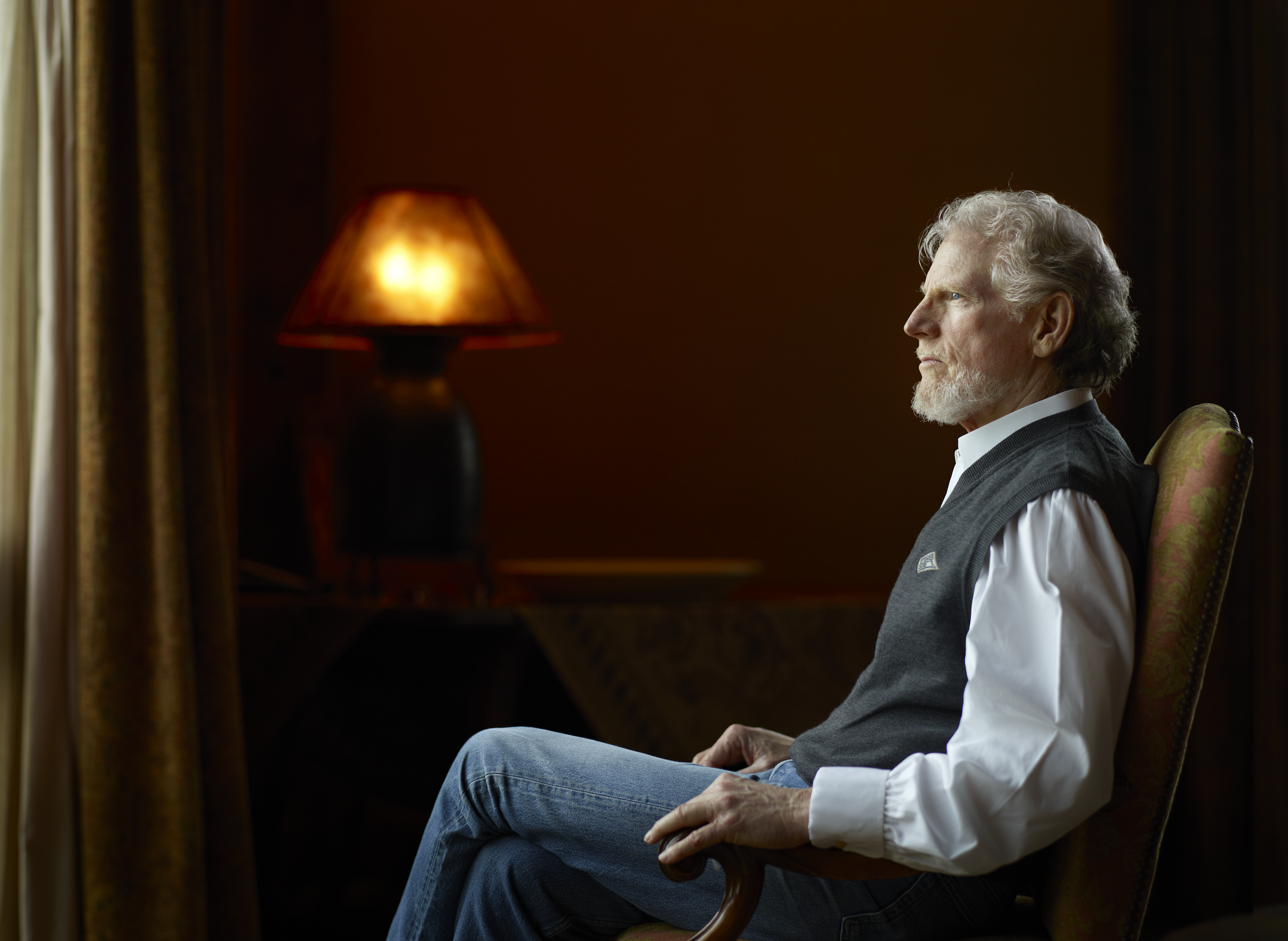
Bill Harlan at Harlan Estate in 2012.

Bill Harlan (born 1940) is an American entrepreneur and vintner who founded and owns Harlan Estate, Promontory and BOND wineries in the Oakville AVA of the Napa Valley, California.

He became successful having founded Pacific Union Company with former competitor Peter C. Stocker. In 1980, Harlan traveled on a three-week trip to the great châteaux of Bordeaux and grands crus of Burgundy, France, based on introductions provided by Robert Mondavi. In 1984, he bought and combined several parcels of land on the western slopes of Oakville in California's Napa Valley and founded Harlan Estate. The estate released its first vintage in 1996.

In March 2020, at the age of 80, Harlan announced that he had appointed his son, Will, as managing director of Harlan Estate and the family's other wineries at Promontory and BOND, while retaining his role as founder and chairman. The appointment was publicly announced in April 2021.

== Early life and background ==
Harlan was born in 1940, and grew up in Whittier, a southeastern suburb of Los Angeles. His father became the director of a meatpacking company after working in the slaughterhouse for many years. During World War II, Bill earned money for upkeeping his neighbour's victory gardens, and has said that this work may have impacted upon him in his later career as a vintner, saying "as a little kid, watching things grow, it's almost like magic". As a teenager in the late 1950s, he was a keen surfer and lifeguard. He attended University of California, Berkeley, where he became a member of the water polo team, with aspirations to compete in the Olympics. He parked cars at Trader Vic's and played card games to make ends meet. He graduated with a degree in communications and public policy in 1963.

Upon graduation, he went to Europe and then Morocco, where he commenced a trip from the north to the southern tip of Africa. A Canadian and an Australian driving a Volkswagen bus took him to Egypt, and he eventually made his way down to the Cape of Good Hope. While working for a Stanford University marine-research vessel in 1968, he decided to become a stockbroker.

== Career ==
In 1973, Harlan began a career in Lake Tahoe real estate and by the mid 1970s had founded his own company, Pacific Union, entering into a business agreement with former competitor Peter C. Stocker. The company started by converting condominiums. One of the company's projects included the development of the $100 million Opera Plaza complex in San Francisco. As Marvin Shanken writes in Wine Spectator, “[Harlan's] success in business, especially real estate, would finance his winegrowing dreams, which had germinated decades earlier [in the 1950s] when the young man visited then-quiet Napa Valley wine country.”

In 1979, Harlan purchased Meadowood, a floundering country club and nine-hole golf course, and turned it into a resort. After a conversation over lunch, Robert Mondavi introduced Bill Harlan to the leading producers of the Bordeaux and Burgundy regions of France. Harlan undertook the journey to France in the summer of 1980 and returned to California with the dream of producing the "California equivalent of a Bordeaux first growth" that would garner respect worldwide, and create a long-lasting legacy through the centuries over multiple generations of his family and team. He concluded that many of the best wines of Europe were produced from grapes grown on slopes, so began to only look at hillside plots. In 1984, when Harlan finally acquired his first parcel of land on the western slopes of Oakville in the Napa Valley, the site had never before been planted, and the vineyards had to be carved out of the raw land to cultivate grapes.

Harlan initially ventured into a partnership with Merryvale Vineyards in 1983, and commenced working with winemaker Bob Levy. At Harlan Estate, Harlan, Levy, and Don Weaver—later the property's director—began small-scale cultivation in 1987, producing the first vintage in 1990, with the guidance of French oenologist Michel Rolland. The wine was sold to the public six years later. Wine critic Robert Parker awarded the 1996 vintage 98 points, and the 2002 vintage a full 100 points.

In 1999, Harlan sold the mortgage and brokerage arm of Pacific Union to the General Motors Corporation's Home Services for an undisclosed figure, estimated to be around $40 million. Though many of his assets remain in real estate, most of his activity is centred around the family's wine ventures in the Napa Valley. In 2001, Harlan established the Napa Valley Reserve, a members-only club near Meadowood which has 60 acres (24 ha) under grape cultivation, orchards, gardens, a farmhouse-style winery and club facilities. Harlan told Wine Spectator in a June 2025 interview that the intention was to establish a wine club in the style of a golf club. At the club, around 500 wine connoisseur couple members can blend their own wines.

In April 2021, at the age of 81, Harlan announced that he had appointed his son, Will, as managing director of Harlan Estate and the family's other wineries at Promontory, BOND and The Mascot, but that he would retain his role as founder and chairman.

== Personal life ==
Jay Cheshes of The Wall Street Journal describes Harlan as "the sort of character you might encounter in a Victorian novel—a former adventurer and adrenaline junkie turned country squire, naturalist and homespun philosopher".

In 1985, Harlan met Deborah Beck, a spokeswoman in television commercials on a blind date. They married at a 12th-century villa in Verona, Italy the following year. Their son, Will, was born in 1987, and daughter Amanda in 1989.
