= Tom Cannavan =

Scottish wine journalist, internet wine site pioneer and author

Tom Cannavan is a Scottish author and a wine journalist. He is considered a pioneer presence on internet of the British wine writing establishment.

== Biography ==
In his youth, Tom had a foretaste of fame as lead vocalist and guitarist in the budding band Restricted Code. He co-wrote (in partnership with his schoolmate Frank Quadrelli) all the songs for this band, drawing on influences from punk, new wave, funk and soul. A promising early career was marked by recording, touring with The Human League in UK and Europe, leading to some John Peel sessions. Paul Morley in NME picked them as “band most likely to…” in 1980, and they were noted as the “best gig of 1980” in Sounds. Restricted Code reformed in 2018.

== Career ==
Cannavan has run the website wine-pages.com since November 1995, widely considered one of the best sites on wine, which received a recommendation by Robert Parker in his book The Wine Buyer's Guide.

Cannavan has published the book The Good Web Guide to Wine (2000) and is a contributor to the annual publications Which? Wine Guide and The Wine Report. He has also contributed to publications such as The Sunday Times, The Independent, The World of Fine Wine, Decanter and GrapesTALK.

In September 2008, Cannavan won International Online Writer of the Year at the Louis Roederer awards for his website. Upon accepting the award Cannavan joked, "I deserve it, I work bloody hard". In 2016 Cannavan launched The Festival of Wine with consumer wine tasting festivals in Glasgow, Edinburgh and London. In 2018 Cannavan was appointed IWSC Wine Communicator of the Year.

Cannavan has previously appeared on STV's The Hour programme as their resident wine expert, between 2009 and 2011, when the show came to an end. He is also the 'resident wine expert' on the BBC Radio Scotland show Macaulay & Co, hosted by Fred MacAulay.

== Awards ==
- 2008: Louis Roederer International Online Wine Writer of the Year
- 2010: Wine Journalist of the Year, Portuguese Wine Awards
- 2018: International Wine Communicator of the Year

== See also ==
- List of wine personalities
