= Lisa Perrotti-Brown =

American wine critic and author

Lisa Perrotti-Brown MW
- Born: 1968; Maine, United States
- Occupation: Wine critic
- Writing career
- Subject: Wine
- Notable awards: Madame Bollinger Foundation Award (2008); Tim Derouet Foundation Award
- Website: www.thewinepalate.com

Lisa Perrotti-Brown (born 1968) is a wine critic, author and Master of Wine based in Napa, California. She is the founder of the wine review publication The Wine Palate, launched in 2025. She was previously editor-in-chief of The Wine Advocate and RobertParker.com, the wine publication and website founded by wine critic Robert Parker, for which she also reviewed the wines of Bordeaux, Napa Valley and Sonoma County, and was a co-founder of the wine review website The Wine Independent. Perrotti-Brown has been interviewed on wine-related topics by mainstream media such as the BBC and CNBC.

== Career ==
Born in Maine, USA, Perrotti-Brown moved to London, UK in the early 1990s to become a playwright, having studied there during her junior year at Colby College. In 1992, she took a job as the manager of a wine bar in Pimlico. This kick-started her more than twenty-year stint in the wine trade, progressing through wine sales and marketing roles in the UK wine trade throughout the 1990s, before moving to Tokyo in 2002, where she worked as a wine buyer for a fine wine importer and a wine educator at Tokyo's Academie du Vin. In 2008, Perrotti-Brown moved to Singapore and began writing a column for Robert Parker's website, then known as eRobertParker.com. Later that year she achieved her Master of Wine (MW) qualification. In December 2012, she was named editor-in-chief for Robert Parker Wine Advocate and RobertParker.com, taking up the post the following year.

In 2015, Perrotti-Brown's first book, Taste Like a Wine Critic: A Guide to Understanding Wine Quality, was published. That year, she relocated to Napa, California, to set up the new USA office for Robert Parker Wine Advocate.

=== The Wine Independent ===
In December 2021, Perrotti-Brown left Robert Parker Wine Advocate after 13 years with the publication, eight of them as editor-in-chief; managing editor Joe Czerwinski succeeded her in the role. In January 2022 she announced The Wine Independent, a subscriber-funded wine review publication co-founded with Swedish photojournalist Johan Berglund, which launched in full in May 2022. The publication's stated editorial policy was to accept no revenue from wine-industry sources and to fund itself through subscriptions alone. Her first Bordeaux en primeur report for the title, covering the 2021 vintage, drew attention for its comparatively low scores, with about a fifth of the wines rated above 90 points.

=== The Wine Palate ===
In May 2025, Perrotti-Brown resigned her shareholding in The Wine Independent and founded The Wine Palate, a Napa-based subscription wine review publication. The site combines a database of wine reviews, winery profiles, and Bordeaux and Napa Valley vintage reports dating back to 1982 with a proprietary search tool, the "Palate Matcher", which filters reviews by stylistic preference.

== Education ==
Perrotti-Brown graduated from Colby College, achieving a B.A. in English and Performing Arts in 1989.

In 1998, she received her Diploma qualification from the Wine & Spirit Education Trust, London.

In 2008, Perrotti-Brown was awarded the Master of Wine qualification by the Institute of Masters of Wine in the United Kingdom.

== Awards and recognitions ==
- Recipient of the Masters of Wine Madame Bollinger Foundation Award.
- Recipient of the Masters of Wine Tim Derouet Foundation Award – the highest MW award given to a graduating MW who has excelled in every part of the exam.
- Ranked number 37 on IntoWine.com's "Top 100 Most Influential People in the U.S. Wine Industry", in 2018.

== See also ==
- List of wine professionals
