= Joshua Greene (wine) =

American wine critic

Joshua Greene is an American wine critic, and the publisher and editor-in-chief of Wine & Spirits.

Having graduated from Princeton University in 1981, Greene pursued a career in the magazine publication industry. After a period of acting as a consultant for Wine & Spirits, Greene eventually purchased the magazine in 1989.

Greene has been an outspoken critic of the 100 point wine rating system, though he has himself applied it in Wine & Spirits since 1994. He has stated, "I don’t think it's a very valuable piece of information", and, "Even though ratings of individual wines are meaningless, people think they are useful", although adding, "One can look at the average ratings of a spectrum of wines from a certain producer, region or year to identify useful trends". Greene will publish one Wine & Spirits issue annually which features no scores.

A Greene 2008 presentation talk at the Unified Wine and Grape Symposium in Sacramento, CA. titled "2008 Restaurant Wine Trends", addressed the changing patterns of the wine industry.

In 2025, Greene joined the British-based wine website JancisRobinson.com as Trade General Manager, according to a press release distributed by JancisRobinson.com.

== See also ==
- List of wine personalities
