= Promontory (winery) =

Coordinates: 38°25′19″N 122°24′52″W

Promontory is a Californian wine estate, based in the eastern foothills of the Napa Valley in Oakville, straddling the border between Oakville and Yountville. It was established in 2008 by the Harlan family of Harlan Estate and has been run by Will Harlan since 2015, with David Cilli as winemaker for the winery since 2012.

The estate is named after the natural formation which conceals the area from the rest of the Napa valley. With an average incline of 40%, it produces a wine which is unique in the Napa Valley. The first available vintage of Promontory was 2009.

== Geography and geology ==
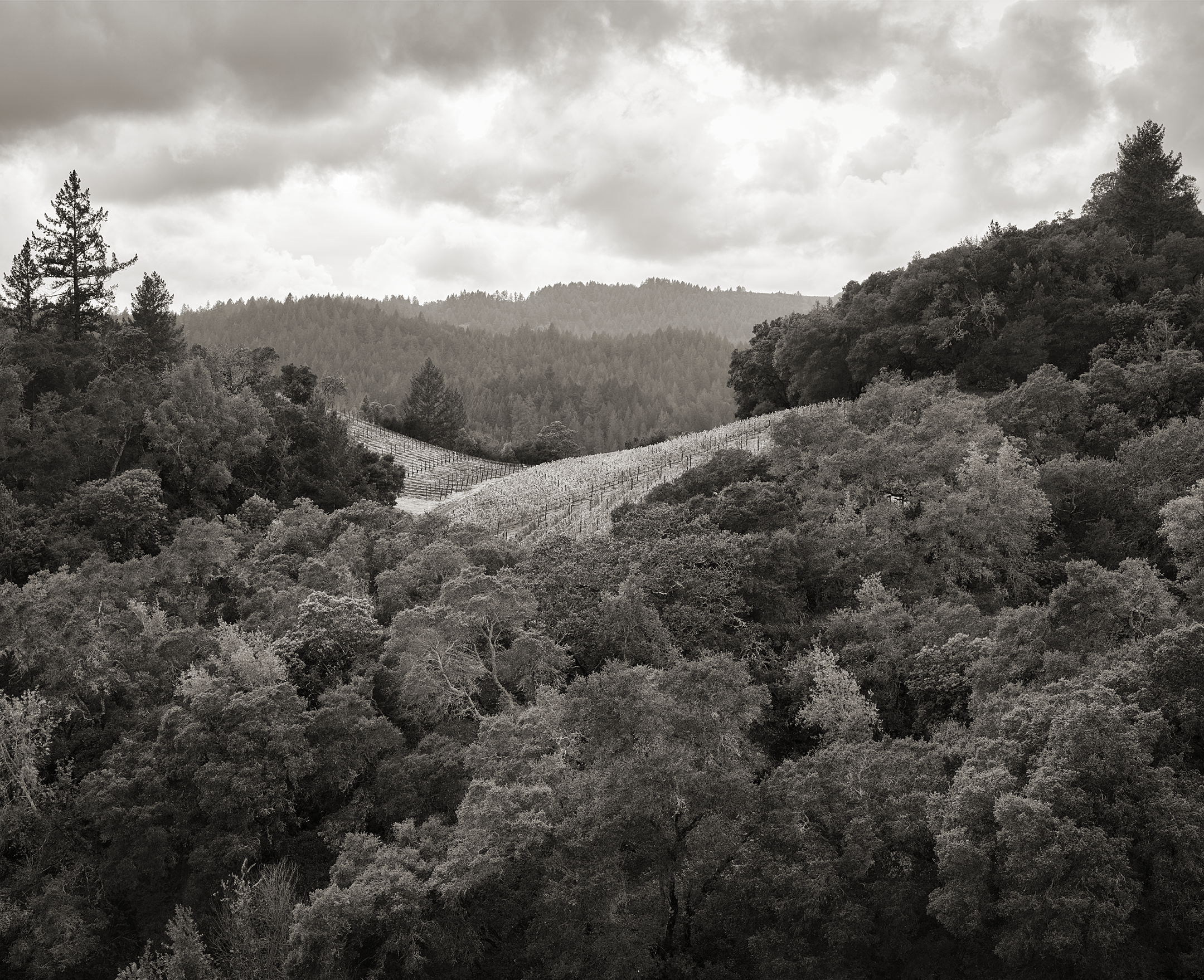
The terrain of the southern block of the Promontory estate

Promontory is a 840 acres (340 ha) territory among the east-facing foothills of the Mayacamas mountains range, near Oakville, in California's Napa Valley. According to The San Francisco Chronicle, the vineyard does not lie within the boundaries of any American Viticultural Area (AVA). The closest neighboring property to the north, just a few hundred yards away, is Harlan Estate.

The lands of Promontory are noted for their diversity in soil, climate, elevation and exposition. The terrain is rugged, likened to the Old West. The slopes average an incline of 40 percent, and less than ten percent of the property is planted to vineyards, lying mainly on the cooler east-facing slopes between 150 meters (490 ft) and 340 meters (1,120 ft) above sea-level. Due to it straddling two seismic fault lines, the estate uniquely has all three different geologic formations: volcanic, sedimentary and metamorphic. The metamorphic soils, consisting of schist, shale, slate, and clay, contribute to the unique character of the site. Fog in the valley has a cooling effect and brings moisture to the vines. Will Harlan is quoted as saying "We have a constant movement of air and fog throughout the year, even in the summer months, among the trees that cover more than 90 percent of the property. This feeling of moving through the cool forest canopy is how we think about its essence."

== Production ==
The Harlan family has described Promontory as a "missing shade of red", due to the wines being more rustic, tannic and acidic than those produced at Harlan Estate. Will Harlan noted that the soils are unique to the site, to the point that in cultivating the wine, practices used on the other family properties had to be reconsidered. The vineyards at Promontory are divided into blocks, which are individually assessed prior to the harvest. Grapes are selected in multiple passes to ensure ideal ripeness. Fermentation is done in separate batches, and there may be over 30 different fermentations.

The cabernet sauvignon wine is typically aged for 30-36 months in Austrian oak casks–ranging from 425 to 845 gallons in capacity–though not released until five and a half years after harvest. Promontory uses a training program known as "Vine Masters", where vineyard workers are promoted and assigned their own block to manage throughout the season, and are involved in the tasting process. The Promontory winery was completed in June 2017, designed by Napa valley architect Howard Backen in a style that is a testament to the early pioneering days of the valley. Situated in close proximity to the vineyard, it has a cellar, a tank room, a lab, and areas for wine tasting. The walls are built from thick concrete and reinforced with steel girders.

Unlike Harlan Estate, the winery allows visitors by appointment, and wine can be purchased at the winery itself. The winery also produces a wine known as Penultimate, from vines that are at their next-to-final stage before graduating into the Promontory wine, that is only sold at the winery. Fruit from the younger vines of Promontory, along with Harlan Estate, and BOND, averaging 10-years of age, contribute to the wine known as The Mascot.

== Reception ==
The wine is critically acclaimed, with critics such as Sara Schneider of Robb Report noting that wines produced in the Promontory vineyard are "unlike any other produced in the Napa Valley". Dr. Liz Thach of Forbes notes that Promontory wines are different from the cabernet-based wines made at the sister wineries of Harlan and BOND in that they "have the structure and pulsating energy of a mountain wine", but also have a "linearity, elegance and ethereal quality, all wrapped up in enticing flavors of blackberry, anise, bay leaves, spice and hints of stone and savory earth."

The Wine Advocate wrote of 2016 Promontory: "Deep garnet-purple, the 2016 Promontory comes barreling out of the glass with bold scents of black cherries, blueberry pie and licorice, leading to a slowly emerging core of crème de cassis, dark chocolate, black soil and truffles plus touches of cumin seed, mossy bark and beef drippings... The finish is both powerful and beautifully nuanced, hedonic and cerebrally gratifying." Georgina Hindle in a review for Decanter awarded the 2018 vintage a full 100 points, writing: "Gorgeous blackcurrant bramble fruit tones on the nose. A hint of plum, juniper, allspice, cinnamon, pepper and violets. Stylish and compelling, a real sense of purity from the first mouthful." Karen MacNeil of the Napa Wine Project wrote that the 2019 vintage is "deep ruby in the glass; there is an intriguing aromatic sweetness of both floral characters and fruit on the bouquet that we have not noticed on the several Promontory bottlings. It offers aromas of dark raspberry, blackberry and blueberries accompanied by scents of rose petals, violets and lavender.... The texture is gravelly, grainy and dusty with a lingering dry character."
