= In Bond =

In Bond may refer to:

- Bottled in bond - American whiskeys (or other spirits) produced to a set of specifications.
- Wines in bond - Under UK law, wines that must be stored in a bonded warehouse approved by HM Customs & Excise.
