= Schildknecht =

Schildknecht is a German surname. Notable people with the surname include:

- David Schildknecht (fl. 1981), American wine critic
- Julieta Schildknecht (born 1960), Swiss-Brazilian photographer and journalist
