= Alice Feiring =

American journalist and author

Alice Feiring is an American journalist and author, for several years a wine and travel columnist for Time magazine, and known as an advocate for "natural wine".

In addition to contributions to publications such as The New York Times, New York Magazine, San Francisco Chronicle, LA Times, Condé Nast Traveler and Forbes Traveler, her blog "The Feiring Line" (formerly: "Veritas in Vino") is considered one of the best in its specific category, and her voice described by Mike Steinberger as part of a new wave of "real flowering of high-quality wine journalism". In 2011, Feiring was selected as "Online Communicator of the Year" by the Louis Roederer International Wine Writer Awards. On Sept. 30, 2020, Feiring was named a Knight of the French Order of Agricultural Merit.

Her first book, published in May 2008, The Battle for Wine and Love: Or How I Saved the World from Parkerization, described as "an opinionated look at the fight to preserve authenticity and diversity in wine", due to its perceived "declaration of war" against critic Robert Parker found some controversy well before its date of release. Reviewing the book, Eric Asimov later wrote, "Ms. Feiring is an uncompromising judge of wine and people who can no more stomach a lover’s preference for a wine she abhors than she can the presence of a microwave in her kitchen." Feiring's critical statements against California wine as "overblown, over-alcoholed, over-oaked, overpriced and over-manipulated" have also sparked controversy.

In 2011, Feiring published Naked Wine: Letting Grapes Do What Comes Naturally. Her 2016 book For the Love of Wine: My Odyssey Through the World's Most Ancient Wine Culture, explores the wine of Georgia. In 2017, Feiring published The Dirty Guide to Wine: Following Flavor from Ground to Glass. She also wrote Natural Wine For The People: What It Is, Where to Find It, How to Love It released in August 2019. Her most recent book is "To Fall In Love, Drink This: A Wine Writer's Memoir" (2022, Simon and Schuster).
