= Larmandier-Bernier =

Grower Champagne producer

Larmandier-Bernier is a producer of grower champagne.

== History ==
Champagne Larmandier-Bernier was established upon the marriage of Philippe Larmandier and Elisabeth Bernier in 1971; their families have been active in the Champagne region since the French Revolution.

== Vineyards ==
Larmandier-Bernier has fifteen hectares under vine, including the Côte des Blancs grands crus villages Cramant, Chouilly, Oger and Avize, and the premiers crus village of Vertus. Most of the family's vineyards are planted to Chardonnay, and about 15% are planted to Pinot Noir. The average age of the vines is 33 years.

== Vinification ==
The Larmandier-Bernier winemaking process never adds more than five grams per liter of sugar. The family estate began to produce organic wine in 1992, and transitioned to biodynamic viticulture in 1999. Larmandier-Bernier uses only indigenous yeasts.

== Awards and honors ==
Larmandier-Bernier has been rated as one of Champagne's top five producers by Andrew Jefford in The New France.
