= Luis Gutiérrez (disambiguation) =

Luis Gutiérrez (born 1953) is a former U.S. representative from Illinois.

Luis Gutiérrez may also refer to:

- Luis Gutiérrez Alliende, Chilean politician
- Luis Gutierrez (artist) (born 1933), Mexican-American artist based in Los Gatos, California
- Luis Gutiérrez Martín (1931–2016), Spanish bishop of the Roman Catholic Church
- Luis Gutiérrez Soto (1900–1977), Spanish architect
- Luis Gutiérrez (wine critic) (born 1965), wine critic based in Madrid, Spain
- Luis Alberto Gutiérrez (born 1985), Bolivian football defender
- Luis Felipe Gutiérrez (born 1988), Paralympic athlete from Cuba
- Luis Gutierrez (baseball) (born 2003), Venezuelan baseball player
