= Allen Meadows =

American wine critic

Allen Meadows is an American wine critic and publisher of the Burghound.com quarterly newsletter and website. He was a financial executive and private wine collector until a profile published in Wine Spectator in 1997 led him to decide to follow his passion for wine. By 2000, Meadows had left his role as CFO at a publicly traded insurance company and launched the Burghound.com site, which offers subscribers newsletters with reviews of Burgundy wine and California and Oregon Pinot noir wines as well as Champagne. Meadows regularly speaks on Burgundy and other wine subjects. Allen Meadows is retained to speak at wine events such as the Asia Symphony of Wine and Flavours - Burghound in Asia, which is held in Singapore.

Within a relatively short time following its launch, the service came to be viewed by many as "the definitive word on matters Burgundian", and Meadows "a leading Burgundy critic".

Among the reasons cited for the success of Burghound.com are that Meadows already held a strong online discussion-group reputation, and that Robert Parker had ceased to cover Burgundy for The Wine Advocate in 1996, and delegated coverage of the region to Pierre Rovani with limited success, providing an opening for Meadows. As Parker already had strained relations with the Burgundy wine community, wine critics of global coverage such as Stephen Tanzer and Clive Coates were perceived to dominate the field. It has been suggested that the Burghound coverage of the 2005 vintage of Burgundy did as much to Meadows' reputation as 1982 Bordeaux did for Robert Parker. Also, Burghound subscribers have access to a massive wine database with reviews from all wines reviewed for more than 2 decades. Burghound has subscribers in over 60 countries.

In 2010, Meadows and his wife Erica self-published a book entitled The Pearl of the Côte on the subject of the history and vineyards of Vosne-Romanée, while opting not to list the book on channels such as Amazon.com. It is available through burghoundbooks.com. A second and extremely well received book by Meadows was published in 2018 with co-author Doug Barzelay, "Burgundy Vintages - a History from 1845" - also available at burghoundbooks.com

== See also ==
- List of wine personalities
