= Luis Gutiérrez (wine critic) =

Spanish wine critic (born 1965)

- Born: April 12, 1965 (age 61); Ávila, Spain
- Education: Universidad Politectnica de Madrid
- Website: www.robertparker.com

Luis Gutiérrez is a wine critic based in Madrid, Spain. He reviews wines from Spain, as well as Chile and Argentina for Robert Parker's Wine Advocate and RobertParker.com, the bimonthly wine publication and website founded by wine critic Robert Parker.

== Career ==
Gutiérrez began his career as an IT professional and worked as a business management executive in Madrid for more than two decades for the large multinational company, Tetra Pak, while devoting much of his free time to wine.

He is a founding member of elmundovino.com, a wine website published in Spanish, where he has written since its creation in the year 2000. He has also written for other publications belonging to the El Mundo newspaper in Spain as well as contributing to various wine and gastronomy publications in Spain, Portugal, Puerto Rico and the UK. From May 2011 to early 2013, Gutiérrez was the Spanish specialist correspondent for Jancisrobinson.com. He was the main contributor of the Spanish entries for the 2008 book 1001 Wines You Must Taste Before You Die and is the co-author of The Finest Wines of Rioja and Northwest Spain published in 2011 in the UK and US and in 2012 in Japan.

== Awards ==
He was awarded the title Cavaleiro da Confraria do Vinho do Porto in 2004 and received the Spanish National Gastronomy Award for journalism in November 2012 from the Spanish Minister for Tourism. The Finest Wines of Rioja and Northwest Spain won the 2011 André Simon Special Commendation Award in London.

As a taster, he has won the Spanish blind tasting championship for pairs (with Ignacio Villalgordo) which Vila Viniteca organizes yearly, and he has been a part of the elmundovino.com team which has twice placed second, in 2009 and 2010, in La Revue du Vin de France's European blind tasting championship.

== Works ==
- Barquin, Jesus; Luis Gutierrez; Victor de la Serna (2011). The Finest Wines of Rioja and Northwest Spain. Aurum Press. ISBN 978-1845136932.

== See also ==
- List of Wine Personalities
