= United Cellars =

- Type: Private
- Genre: Wine & Spirits Merchant
- Founded: 2004
- Founder: Anthony Ghattas
- Headquarters: Sydney, Australia
- Products: Wine, spirits
- Services: Wine storage, events and advisory service
- Website(s): unitedcellars.com.au, unitedcellars.co.nz

United Cellars is an independent wine and spirits merchant located in Australia, New Zealand, and Canada. The company retails wines and spirits from Australia, New Zealand, Europe, and the Americas, including En Primeur wine futures from Bordeaux and Burgundy, France. United Cellars also has a wine advisory service.

== History ==
United Cellars was established in 2004 by Anthony Ghattas as part of the United Lifestyle Group (ULG). The United Lifestyle Group has three divisions: United Cellars Australia and United Cellars New Zealand, United Galleries, and United Networks.

== Markets ==
United Cellars has offices in Sydney and Auckland, and in late 2012 opened an office in Vancouver, British Columbia, Canada. The company primarily sells in the Australian and New Zealand markets. It has bonded storage facilities in Bordeaux, France. It also offers local wine storage options to its Australian and New Zealand customers. The company also hosts wine events in Sydney, Melbourne, Brisbane, Perth, Auckland, Wellington, and Hong Kong.
