= Finigan =

Finigan is a surname. Notable people with the surname include:

- Anthony Finigan (1926–2009), British actor and director
- Jim Finigan (1928–1981), Major League Baseball infielder
- Robert Finigan (1943–2011), American wine and restaurant critic
- Vinny Finigan (born 1989), English rugby league player
