= Elin McCoy =

American wine critic

Elin McCoy is an American wine and spirits columnist for Bloomberg Markets, international wine judge, and a contributor to publications such as Food & Wine, The New York Times, House & Garden and Zester Daily.

== Education ==
McCoy obtained her degree from the University of Pennsylvania and later attended graduate school at the University of London and New York University.

== Books ==
McCoy is the author of the 2005 book The Emperor of Wine, the unauthorised biography of Robert Parker, She also wrote "Reign of American Taste," co-authored "Thinking About Wine," a number of children's books, a parenting book, and a travel guide.

She has also co-authored several books with her husband John Frederick Walker, as well as a long-running column in Food & Wine.

== Career ==
McCoy writes a bimonthly column for Bloomberg News' global news wire along with a monthly column for Bloomberg Markets and Zesterdaily.com. For 25 years, McCoy was a contributing editor at Food & Wine. She has since worked as a columnist for House Beautiful, Las Vegas Life, Shattered, and Drink.

== Personal ==
She is married to writer and artist John Frederick Walker. Together they live in Kent, Connecticut.

== See also ==
- List of wine personalities
