= Wine & Spirits =

American wine magazine

Wine & Spirits Magazine
- Cover of the final print issue
- Publisher/ Editor: Joshua Greene
- Categories: Wine magazines
- Frequency: 4 issues/year
- Total circulation: 12,000
- Founded: 1981
- Company: Wine & Spirits Magazine, Inc.
- Country: United States
- Based in: New York, NY
- Language: English
- Website: wineandspiritsmagazine.com
- ISSN: 0890-0299

Wine & Spirits is an American wine magazine. With an editorial and business office in New York, the magazine publishes four issues annually.

== History ==
The magazine was started under the name Winestate's Wine & Spirits Buying Guide. In October 1984 it changed to Wine & Spirits. Joshua Greene acquired Wine & Spirits in 1989.

While the magazine has been rating wine on a 100-point scale since 1994, Greene is an outspoken critic of the system.

In May 2024, Greene announced the magazine was in "considerable debt" and would cease print publication. All staff were laid off, but the website would continue to be updated.

== Staff ==
In addition to publisher and editor-in-chief Joshua Greene, the editorial staff includes Patrick Comiskey, Stephanie Johnson, Corey Warren, Susannah Smith, and Alissa Bica. Nick Mrozowski is the creative director. Contributors include Patricio Tapia, David Darlington, Elaine Chukan Brown, Chantal Martineau, David Schildknecht, Fiona Morrison MW and Tyler Colman.

== See also ==
- List of food and drink magazines
