= Harlan Estate =

California wine estate

Coordinates: 38°24′54″N 122°24′30″W

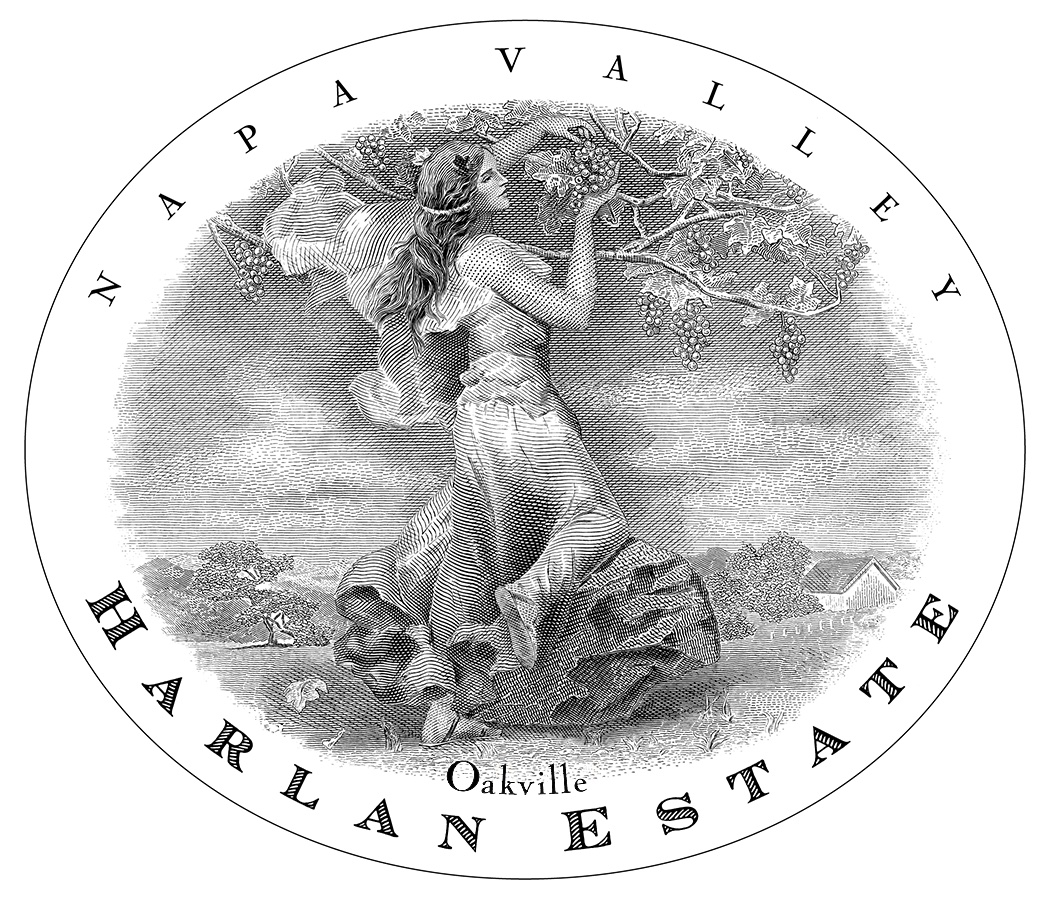
- Location: Oakville, California, USA
- Appellation: Oakville AVA
- Founded: 1984
- First vintage: 1990
- Key people: Bill Harlan (Founder and Chairman); Will Harlan (Managing Director), Bob Levy (Director of Winegrowing); Don Weaver (Estate Director); Cory Empting (Winemaker); Mary Maher (Vineyard Manager)
- Known for: Harlan Estate; The Maiden
- Website: www.harlanestate.com

Harlan Estate is a California wine estate that produces Cabernet Sauvignon-based wine. The estate is located in the western hills of Napa Valley, within the Oakville AVA, in the Napa Valley AVA zone.

The estate was established in 1984 by Bill Harlan, who envisioned a 200-year plan for the future of the business. The entire Harlan estate property extends 240 acres (97 ha), of which approximately 40 acres (16 ha) is planted to vineyard while the remaining lands are forest and woodlands. Bob Levy was Director of Winemaking from 1983 until Cory Empting took over the role in 2008. In April 2021, at the age of 80, Harlan announced that he had appointed his son, Will Harlan, as managing director of Harlan Estate and his family's other properties and winegrowing endeavours, which include Promontory, BOND, and The Mascot, while Bill Harlan retains the role as founder and chairman.

Harlan Estate has been cited as being among the most celebrated red wines made in the United States, which commands high prices due to quality, scarcity and critical reception. Its flagship wine is the eponymous Harlan Estate. The property also produces a second wine called The Maiden. Harlan Estate typically produces around 2000 cases a year, which are distributed in about 50 countries worldwide.

== History ==
Harlan Estate was founded in 1984 by American entrepreneur and vintner H. William Harlan (Bill Harlan), a real estate developer and Napa Valley resort owner. It is located within the western hills of Oakville, California on a 240-acre (97 ha) property consisting of forest and situated on steep, east-facing slopes. Harlan had initially begun searching for a property in 1978 and visited Europe on a research trip by way of introductions from winemaker Robert Mondavi in 1980. Harlan had established a 200-year plan for what was to be a family business, but it wasn't until 1984 that he was able to identify and acquire the land he had sought, with the expressed ambition to create a first growth wine of California.

Harlan commenced small-scale production wine in 1987, and the estate still has vintages from the years 1987, 1988, and 1989 which were never released. The first commercial vintage of 1990 wasn't sold until 1996. This endeavor has been described as an "empirical learning experience with some trial and error, but also grounded in a vigorous attempt at discernment". The 1990 vintage was available for purchase directly at the winery, while the 1991 vintage was the first to be sold to restaurants and bottle retailers. The first vintage of The Maiden was 1995. In 2004, Harlan "added a sequential serial number and a randomly generated number tied together with an RFID chip" on their bottles to combat counterfeit items being sold on the market; each bottle can be verified on their website.

In April 2021, at the age of 80, Harlan announced that he had appointed his son, Will Harlan, as managing director of Harlan Estate and his family's other properties at Promontory, BOND, and The Mascot, while he retained his role as founder and chairman.

== Personnel ==
The founding director of winegrowing, Bob Levy, began working with Harlan in 1987, and continues today in an active emeritus role. Cory Empting was appointed director of winegrowing in 2008. Don Weaver is the founding director of the estate.

== Production ==
The Oakville estate extends 240 acres (97 ha), of which 40 acres (16 ha) is planted to vineyard, primarily Cabernet Sauvignon. The estate, on the eastern side of the Mayacamas Mountains is situated between 225 feet (69 m) and 1,225 feet (373 m) in elevation. The vineyards lie between 325 feet (99 m) and 525 feet (160 m) in an area Bill Harlan named "The Tenderloin". The estate incorporates around 240 acres (97 ha) of oak woodlands and conifer at the high elevations. It loops around to the south in a horseshoe shape, with the vineyards planted on soils of volcanic origin. Harlan has established a 200-year plan for the estate over several decades.

In 1985, Bill Harlan began planting grapevines, with about 2.5 acres (1.0 ha) placed under cultivation. Harlan was taking a major risk in that it was virgin land which had never been used for wine production. In 2002 and 2004 it was extended further to the current 16 acres (6.5 ha) of vines.

Cory Empting is known to practice dry farming at the estate. Empting introduced a program known as Vine Masters, where vineyard managers are "invited to work a block for the rest of their lives". Napavalley.wine states that "The spare soils and benevolent mesoclimate foster low yields and slow, even ripening". The estate typically produces about 2000 cases a year. The design of the first Harlan Estate wine label, which was 10 years in the making, was inspired by a 19th-century engraving and overseen by retired U.S. Treasury engraver Herb Fichter. According to Harlan, the label was designed for a bottle that "would sit on a table in candlelight, not on a store shelf."

== Reception ==
Described by Jancis Robinson as "one of the ten best wines of the twentieth century", Harlan Estate wines are highly acclaimed, including multiple perfect scores of 100 "parker points", which has contributed in part to the wine's high price. The first vintage (1990) released at $65 a bottle, rose in price on the secondary market, and may range from $1,500 and up. A 10-vintage vertical selection of magnum bottles sold at the 2000 Napa Valley Wine Auction for $700,000.

In his book, The New Classic Winemakers of California, wine writer and expert Steve Heimoff notes that Harlan Estate wines are "renowned for their staying power" in an "industry known for the fickleness of its consumers". Jay Cheshes of The Wall Street Journal states that Harlan "produces one of the most consistently celebrated red wines in the United States". Jay McInirney of Town & Country Magazine states that Harlan Estate wines "redefined the style of Napa reds".

Harlan bottles are distributed in about 50 countries worldwide. Adam Lechmere of Decanter Magazine states that "The finest wines are brightly perfumed in youth and mellowing to dried petals and dried herb as they age; there is earth, blue fruit ageing to dark, a certain savouriness and sometimes an animal tang (“most of the estate is wild land”). The Robb Report hailed the 2016 vintage of Harlan Estate as "the greatest Napa Valley Cabernet Sauvignon of the Century". In 2024 and 2025, the winery received The Golden Vines Award as The Best Fine Wine Producer in the Americas.
