= Anthony Hanson =

British Master of Wine and a senior consultant

Anthony Hanson is a British Master of Wine and a senior consultant to Christie's International Wine Department, as well as an expert on Burgundy, an international wine judge and author. His book Burgundy was first published in 1982, and since reissued in 2003. Following its initial publication, the book gained notoriety in part due to the famous description, "Great Burgundy smells of shit", or in French, "Ça sent la merde". The sentence was modified in later editions.

Hanson has also contributed to publications such as Decanter and The World of Fine Wine.

== See also ==
- List of wine personalities
