= Wine critic =

Person who delivers verdicts surrounding wine

A wine critic is a person who evaluates wine and describes it either with a numerical rating, a tasting note, or a combination of both. Their critiques, found in books, newspapers, magazines, newsletters, online, or in sales materials for wine, are often used by consumers in the process of deciding whether or not to buy a wine.

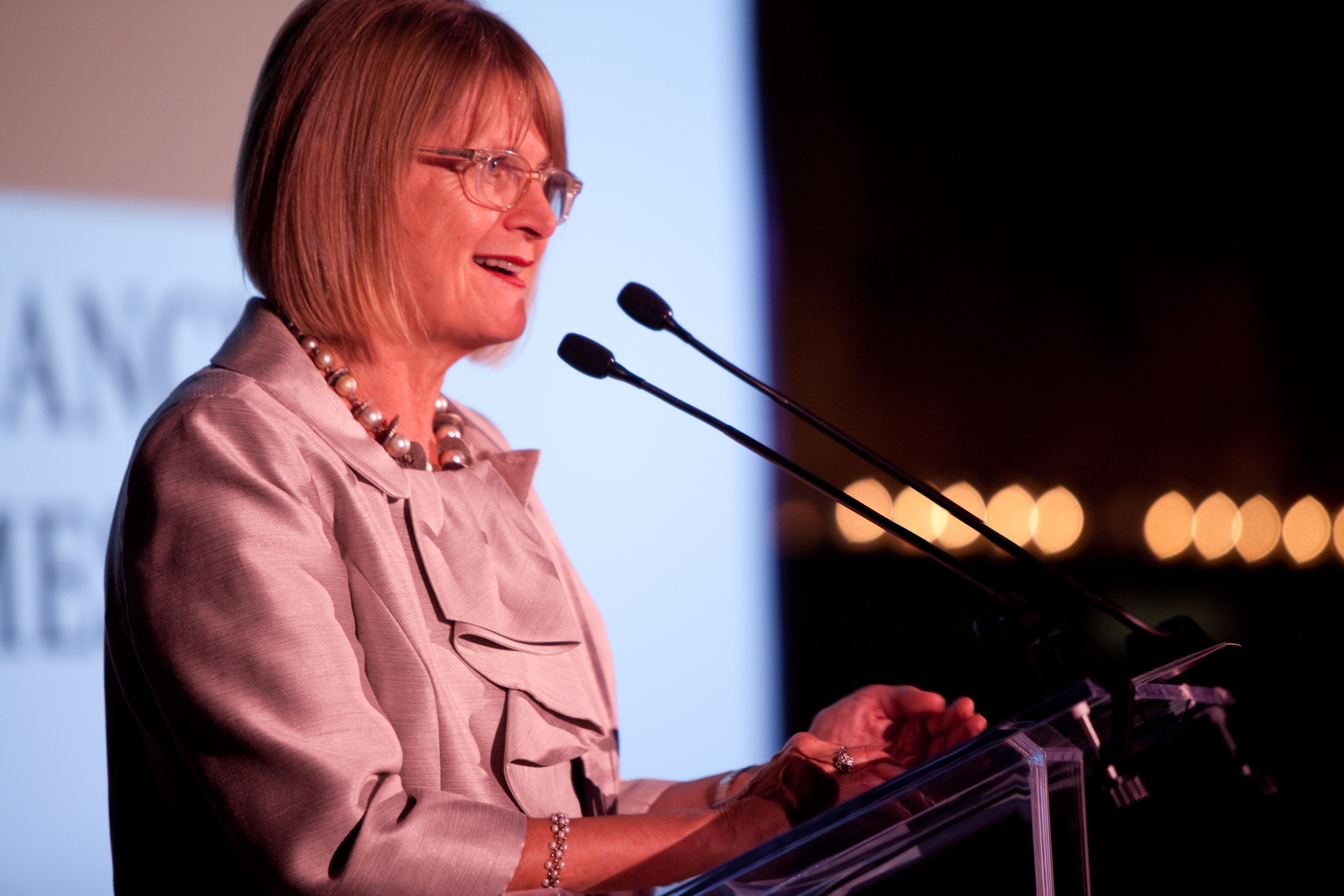
Wine critic Jancis Robinson speaking at an event in 2010.

== Journalistic criticism ==
Critics working for wine-related magazines generally review new releases, often in comparison with other wines from the same region, grape variety, or vintage. Occasionally, retrospective tastings will be published as well, tasting wines years or decades after their initial review was published.

== Methodology ==
The tasting methodology of different outlets varies; for example, the American publication, Wine Spectator, has editors taste wines blind in flights of similar vintage and variety. Other outlets taste in similar fashion. Different critics will use different descriptive scales, with the major US critics using a 50–100 point scale, and most newspapers using a 5-star scale.

== Notable critics ==
- James Laube, editor at Wine Spectator
- Antonio Galloni, former reviewer at Wine Advocate; founder of Vinous
- Allen Meadows, publisher of Burghound
- Robert M. Parker, publisher of the Wine Advocate
- Lisa Perrotti-Brown, editor in chief of the Wine Advocate; Master of Wine
- Jancis Robinson, British Master of Wine; Financial Times writer
- Stephen Tanzer, editor at Vinous
- Gary Vaynerchuk, director of Wine Library, former Internet critic
