= Patrick Comiskey =

American wine critic

Patrick Comiskey is an American wine critic and a senior correspondent for Wine & Spirits, chief critic for non-California domestic wines, and writes about wines of California, Oregon and Washington. Comiskey contributes regularly to Los Angeles Times and Zester Daily, and has been published in various periodicals such as San Francisco Chronicle, Food & Wine and Bon Appétit.

Comiskey has bachelor's degrees in English and psychology from the University of Wisconsin–Madison, a master's degree from Brown University. He is a former sommelier. In June 2010 it was reported he is writing a book about the American Rhône-movement.

Comiskey's book, American Rhone: How Maverick Winemakers Changed the Way Americans Drink, was published in 2016 and received favorable reviews.

== See also ==
- List of wine personalities
