= Stephen Tanzer =

American wine critic and editor

Stephen Tanzer is an American wine critic and editor at Vinous. From 1985 until he joined Vinous in 2014, Tanzer was the publisher of the critically acclaimed bimonthly International Wine Cellar, an independent journal read by wine professionals and other wine lovers in all 50 U.S. states and 34 countries, and the first American wine periodical to be translated into French and Japanese. Tanzer has particular expertise on the wines of Bordeaux, as well as other prominent wine regions, including Burgundy, California, Washington State, and South Africa.

Tanzer has written wine columns for Food & Wine Magazine and Forbes FYI. Among his books are The WineAccess Buyer's Guide and Food and Wine Magazine's Official Wine Guide.

Tanzer's International Wine Cellar, which employed a modern wine rating system on a 70-100 point quality scale, was considered in direct competition with Robert Parker's The Wine Advocate, though Tanzer's "controlled prose" is in contrast to the more flamboyant style of Parker. Tanzer still uses this scale in his ratings and reviews with Vinous.

In February 2010, Tanzer launched the website "Winophilia" in the wine blog format, which published short articles by Tanzer, IWC collaborator Josh Raynolds, and other IWC contributors.

On November 18, 2014 Vinous, founded by Antonio Galloni, announced it had agreed to acquire Stephen Tanzer's IWC and in late 2014 IWC's archive had been transferred in a combined site home, available to both Vinous and IWC readers.

== See also ==
- List of wine personalities
