= Robert Finigan =

American wine and restaurant critic

Robert Finigan (September 22, 1943 – October 1, 2011) was an American wine and restaurant critic based in San Francisco, California. Finigan exerted his greatest influence as a wine critic in the late 1970s and early 1980s, with his monthly newsletter.

Robert Finigan's interest in wine was sparked while studying at Harvard University, where one of his classmates came from a French wine-producing family. After having completed his studies, he moved to San Francisco in 1967 to take up a position in management consulting. There, he became acquainted with Napa Valley wines, at a time when California wine had not reached national popularity, but was primarily consumed on the west coast. Several business trips to Europe also offered him opportunities to become acquainted with French, German, Italian, Portuguese and Spanish wine regions. His first opportunity to try his hand on wine criticism came in 1970, when San Francisco wine merchant company Esquin's asked him to evaluate the 1969 Bordeaux vintage, since Esquin's was uncertain whether to buy the wines en primeur. After tasting the unbottled wines from cask, Finigan was unimpressed and advised against buying, and it turned out that this evaluation was later reflected in other critics' evaluations of the vintage.

== Newsletter ==
In September 1972, Finigan published the first issue of "Robert Finigan's Private Guide to Wines". As a subscriber to "Jack Shelton's Private Guide to Restaurants" (which he later bought), Finigan's intention was to do to the wine scene what Shelton did to restaurants, and covered Californian and European wine including wines available in restaurants in the Bay Area. In difference to the numerical scale popularized by Robert M. Parker, Jr. some years later, Finigan initially rated wines in four broad quality categories: Outstanding, Above Average, Average and Well Below Average. Finigan's newsletter was consumer-oriented, did not shy from criticising wines that Finigan thought were substandard, and quickly became popular. In 1977, Finigan added a national edition of his newsletter, and was to some extent also read outside the US. Finigan's base in Bordeaux was at his friend Alexis Lichine's Chateau Prieure Lichine in Margaux. Robert was such a close friend to Alexis that he literally had the keys to the Châteaux. Even if Alexis was not in Bordeaux at the Châteaux, the housekeepers were told to treat Robert with the same courtesy as though Alexis were at home. Robert was very accustomed to tasting the Bordeaux of the 'house' every time he was at the Prieure. In 1975, while at the Chateau he tasted and reported on the fabulous vintages of Prieure and Lascombes 61, 62, and 64. ( see The Pope of Wine- the biography of Alexis Lichine in the selected publications).

== Evaluation of the 1982 Bordeaux vintage ==
In March 1983, Finigan was one of very few US wine writers or critics to travel to Bordeaux for the tasting from the barrel of the 1982 vintage. In late 1982, Finigan had reported in his newsletter on the enthusiastic early evaluations coming out of Bordeaux from proprietors like Jean-Pierre Moueix and Alexis Lichine. However, when he tried the barrel samples, he was generally disappointed, and found the wines too alcoholic and lacking in flavor. He therefore gave the 1982 Bordeaux vintage a fairly bad review in the March 30, 1983 edition of his newsletter, and recommended his readers buying Bordeaux wines of the 1980 and 1981 vintages instead.

Another US wine critic who tasted the 1982s from barrel was Robert M. Parker, Jr., who at this time was much less established than Finigan. Parker gave the 1982s the highest possible acclaim, described them as one of greatest Bordeaux vintages of the century, and predicted steep price increases for those who did not secure their 1982s en primeur. Later in 1983, Wine Spectator through its writer James Suckling concurred with Parker, while Finigan strongly stood by his negative evaluation of the vintage.

After more and more critics adopted Parker's view on the 1982 Bordeaux vintage and prices rose, Finigan's influence as a wine critic started to decline, while Parker achieved his breakthrough. In the late 1980s Finigan was considered much less influential than Parker and several others.

His newsletter was eventually cancelled in 1990, but Finigan remained an influential San Francisco restaurant critic.

== Selected publications ==
- Finigan, Robert (1987). Robert Finigan's Essentials of Wine: A Guide to Discovering the World's Most Pleasing Wines. Knopf. ISBN 0-394-51591-9.
- Finigan, Robert (2006). Corks and Forks: Thirty Years of Wine and Food. Shoemaker & Hoard. ISBN 1-59376-099-X.
- Hennessy, Leslie A. The Pope of Wine- a biography of Alexis Lichine. SF: Montrachet Publishing, 2009.
