= Andrew Jefford =

English journalist, poet and writer

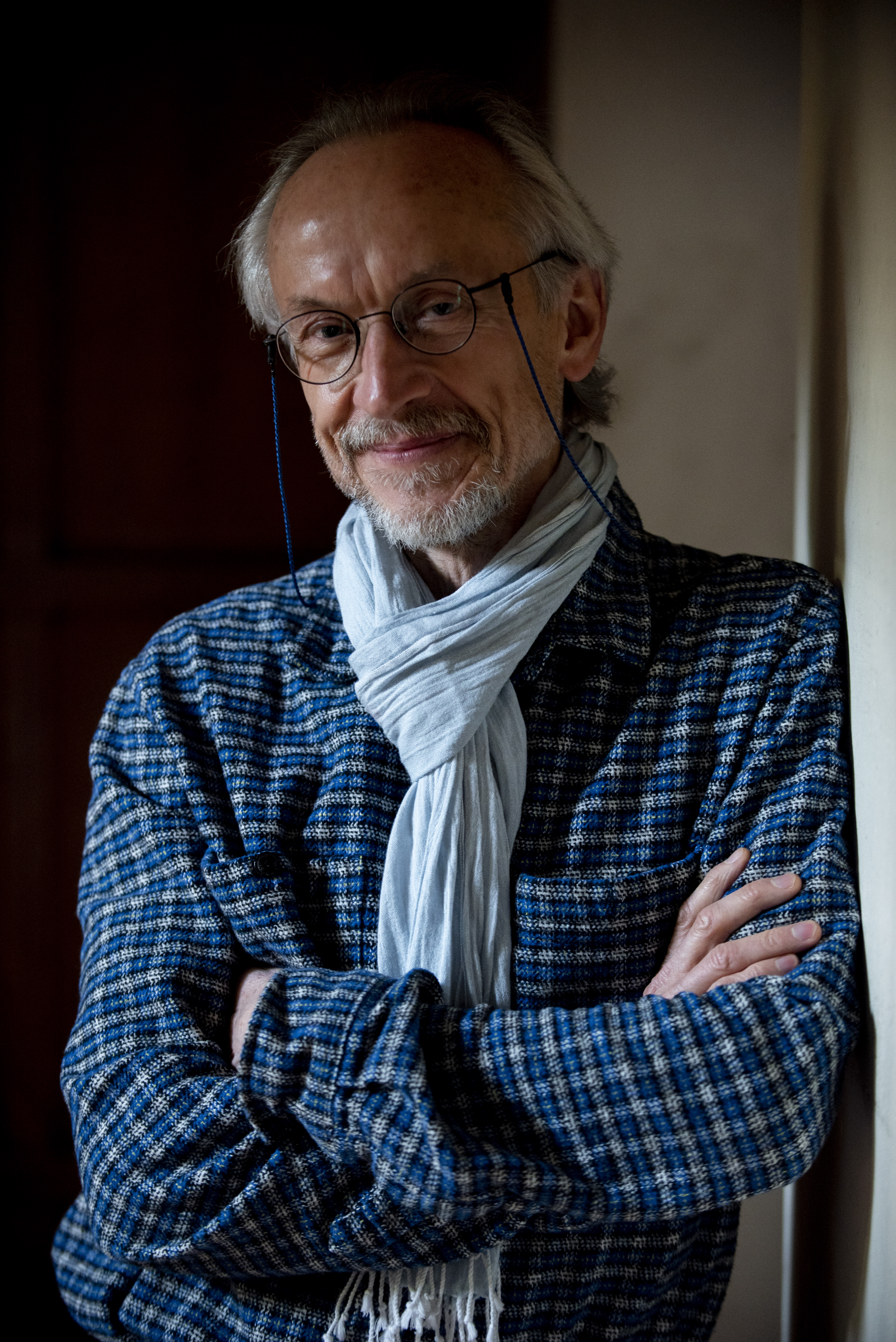
Andrew Jefford in May 2022

Andrew Jefford (born 1956) is an English journalist, poet, and writer, the author of various books and columns on wine, whisky, travel and perfume.

== Education ==
The son of a Church of England clergyman and the eldest of three brothers, Jefford grew up in Norfolk, England. He was educated at Gresham's School, the University of Reading (where he read English, awarded First Class Honours) and the University of East Anglia, where his post-graduate studies were jointly supervised by the late Sir Malcolm Bradbury and Guido Almansi. At UEA he obtained an MA in the 19th and 20th Century novel (awarded With Distinction), then worked for two years on a PhD thesis on the short fiction of Robert Louis Stevenson, which was not completed.

== Career ==
He began work as an editor with Paul Hamlyn's Octopus Group, and his passions for wine and writing led to articles and books on wine, after four years in publishing in 1988. He was the drinks writer for The Evening Standard, the evening newspaper for the London region, between 1992 and 2002, worked as an occasional presenter for BBC Radio Four's The Food Programme and other programmes on BBC Radio Three and Radio Four (1992–2007), and has written widely for The Financial Times on wine and travel (2003–2021). He is a Contributing Editor to and writes a monthly column for Decanter magazine. Jefford is also contributing editor to the quarterly magazine The World of Fine Wine for which he writes the One Bottle column and regularly takes part in tastings. He is one of the four co-chairs for Decanter World Wine Awards, and works as Academic Advisor to The Wine Scholar Guild.

Among his books are The New France (2002), Peat Smoke and Spirit (2004, republished as Whisky Island in 2019), Andrew Jefford's Wine Course (2008, revised edition published 2016) and Drinking With The Valkyries (2022).

On television, he has worked as a chef's assistant and has reported on whisky for Food File (Channel 4, 1996) and SCAM (Carlton Television, 2003)

Jefford has lived with his family, Paula, John and Joe, near Montpellier, France, since 2010, after 15 months spent in Adelaide, South Australia, where he was Wine Writer in Residence to the Wine 2030 Research Network and a Senior Research Fellow at Adelaide University. He is also a published poet, with work featured in The Spectator and The Independent.

== Bibliography ==
- Dr Jekyll and Professor Nabokov: Reading a Reading, in Robert Louis Stevenson (critical essays), ed. Andrew Noble (1983)
- Port, An Essential Guide to the Classic Drink (Exeter Books and Merehurst, 1988)
- Which? Wine Guide 1991 (Consumers' Association, 1990)
- The Magic of Champagne (St Martin's Press, 1991) ISBN 0-312-09865-0
- The Wines of Germany (Mitchell Beazley, 1994)
- The Evening Standard Wine Guide 1996 (Pavilion, 1995)
- The Evening Standard Wine Guide 1997 (Evening Standard Books, 1996)
- Smokes (Evening Standard Books, 1997)
- One Hundred and One Things You Need to Know About Wine (Simon & Schuster UK, 1998) ISBN 0-7432-0509-X
- Wine Tastes Wine Styles (Ryland Peters & Small, 2000) ISBN 1-84172-050-X
- The New France: A Complete Guide to Contemporary French Wine (2002) ISBN 1-84000-410-X
- After-Dinner Drinks: Discovering, Exploring, Enjoying (Ryland Peters & Small, 2003) ISBN 1-84172-508-0
- Choosing Wine (Ryland Peters & Small, 2003) ISBN 1-84172-510-2
- Peat Smoke and Spirit: A Portrait of Islay and its Whiskies (Headline Books, 2005) ISBN 0-7472-4578-9, republished as Whisky Island: A Portrait of Islay and its Whiskies (Headline Home, 2019) ISBN 978-1-4722-6222-6
- Andrew Jefford’s Wine Course (Ryland, Peters & Small, 2008; revised and updated version 2016 ISBN 978-1-84975-778-2)
- Drinking With The Valkyries: Writings on Wine (Académie du Vin Library, 2022) ISBN 978-1-913141-32-5

== Awards and honours ==
Jefford has won many awards for his work, including eight Glenfiddich Awards (for writing on wine and other drinks), eight Roederer Awards (for writing on wine), two Jasmine Awards (for writing on perfume), two Beer Writer of the Year awards, a Sony Award (for radio work) and awards for other writing, including travel writing. He publishes short texts via his Twitter account (@andrewcjefford).

== See also ==
- List of wine personalities
