= Jamie Goode =

British author with a PhD in plant biology and wine columnist

Jamie Goode is a British author with a PhD in plant biology, and a wine columnist of The Sunday Express. Goode also contributes to wine publications such as Harpers, The World of Fine Wine, Decanter, GrapesTALK and Sommelier Journal. Goode played guitar in folk rock band Tintagel which released the album Sword and Stone in 1991.

== Publications ==
Goode published the book Wine science: the application of science in winemaking in 2005 (in United States as The Science of Wine: From Vine to Glass), to wide acclaim and winning the Glenfiddich Drink Book of the Year award, and Wine Bottle Closures in 2006. His website "The Wine Anorak" and the related blog launched in 2001 are among the internet's most highly regarded wine sites, containing in-depth articles on subjects such as wine chemistry issues.

== See also ==
- List of wine personalities
