= Zester Daily =

Defunct food and wine online magazine

Zester Daily was a food and wine online magazine, published by a team led by Corie Brown, a former writer and editor for the Los Angeles Times. The site, founded in August 2009, was launched with the statement, "In the face of the bleak news of Gourmet magazine's demise and newspapers' financial struggles, a collection of award-winning journalists has banded together to create Zester Daily, a pioneering news site covering all aspects of what we eat and drink." The magazine ceased in 2016.

Content contributors include Clifford Wright, Martha Rose Shulman, Nancy Harmon Jenkins, Elin McCoy, Terra Brockman, Robyn Eckhardt, Sandra Wu, Patrick Comiskey and Jordan Mackay.
