= Michael Steinberger =

American author and journalist

- Born: Michael Steinberger; January 23, 1967 (age 59)
- Education: Haverford College
- Occupations: Author; Journalist

Michael Steinberger is an American author and journalist, who served as the wine columnist of the internet magazine Slate from 2002 to 2011.

He has been described as "one of the greatest wine writers on the planet", and to possess a "blessedly trustworthy voice and palate". Steinberger has himself stated his palate is Euro-centric, having been cultivated on French wine, with the wine from Bordeaux and Burgundy being his "touchstones".

Currently, Steinberger serves as a freelance writer, often involving topics regarding tennis, for publications including The New York Times.

== Career ==
Steinberger has previously worked as a Hong Kong correspondent for Maclean's. He has also contributed to publications such as The New York Times, Saveur, Financial Times, The Economist, Food & Wine, New York Magazine, Wine Spectator, The World of Fine Wine, and Sommelier Journal. Steinberger's Slate column that had run since June, 2002 was terminated as a result of layoffs by Slate parent company The Washington Post Company in August, 2011.

== Controversy ==
One of Steinberger's articles published by Slate in 2002, "Grape Rot: The New Wine Spectator's Distinct Aroma of Fishiness", led to a harsh response by Wine Spectator executive editor Tom Matthews. Steinberger's articles were no longer published in Wine Spectator after the article, and Matthews demanded a retraction of the article, while recommending that Slate "no longer accept Steinberger's unprofessional and potentially libelous contributions".

An article that revealed Steinberger's distaste for the Sauvignon blanc grape, "White Lies: Why Sauvignon Blanc is Overrated", was widely met with surprise by the wine writers' community.

In a Slate article titled "Change We Can Taste", written concerning an interview with White House food and beverage operations usher Daniel Shanks published on Bloomberg.com, Steinberger called for a new "wine policy" for the Obama presidency. Coining the term "Shafer-gate", in reference to the serving of bottles of "extravagant" 2003 Shafer Hillside Select, costing around $250 a bottle, at a November 2008 emergency economic summit, the article described the Bush era tactics of "shock and awe" in terms of wine policy, achieved with what Steinberger calls "fruit bombs"; he wrote that the White House wine service had been "hostage to a profoundly misguided strategy", and pointed to Obama's opportunity "to act swiftly and boldly on the wine front". When the article was described by Decanter.com to have "slammed the White House wine policy", its contents were quoted and reiterated without any element of satire.

== Bibliography ==
- Au Revoir to All That: Food, Wine, and the End of France (2009)
- The Wine Savant: A Guide To The New Wine Culture (2013)
- The Philosopher in the Valley: Alex Karp, Palantir, and the Rise of the Surveillance State (2025)

== See also ==
- List of wine personalities
