= En primeur =

Wine purchasing method

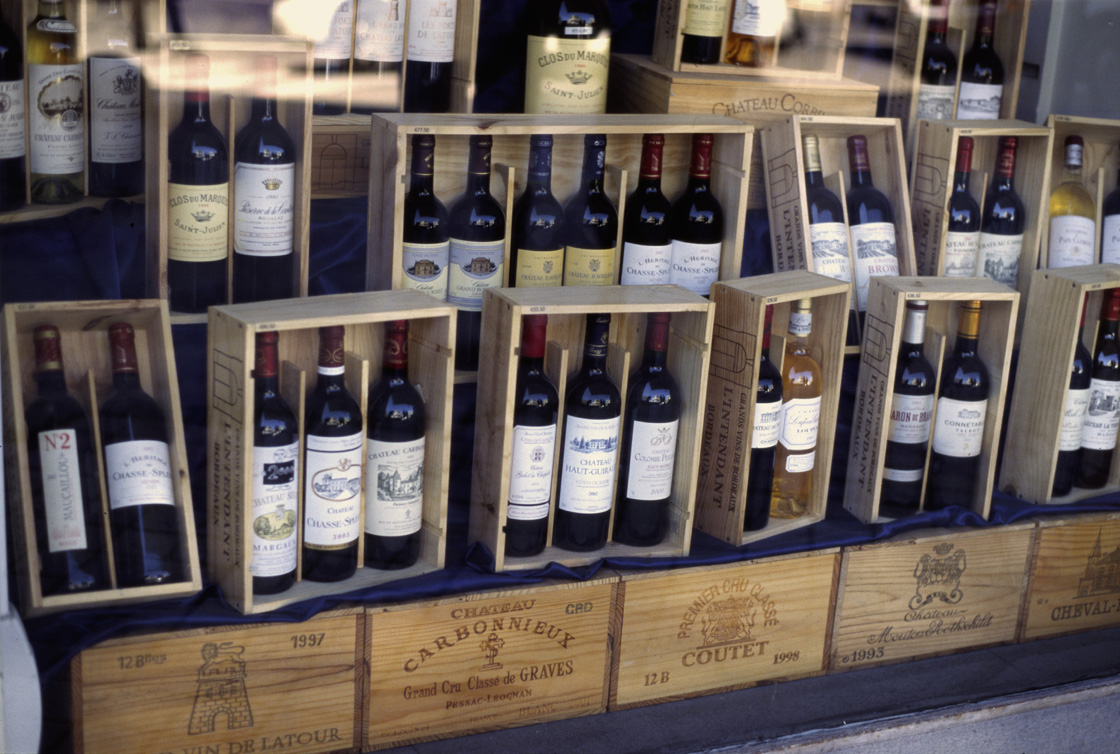
Bordeaux wine

En primeur or "wine futures", is a method of purchasing wines early while the wine (a vintage) is still in the barrel. This offers the customer the opportunity to invest before the wine is bottled. Payment is made at an early stage, a year or 18 months prior to the official release of a vintage. A possible advantage of buying wines en primeur is that the wines may be considerably cheaper during the en primeur period than they will be once bottled and released to the market. However, that is not guaranteed and some wines may lose value over time. Wine experts, like Tom Stevenson, recommend buying en primeur for wines with very limited quantities and will most likely not be available when they are released. The wines most commonly offered en primeur are from Bordeaux, Burgundy, the Rhône Valley and Port, although other regions are adopting the practice.

== Process ==
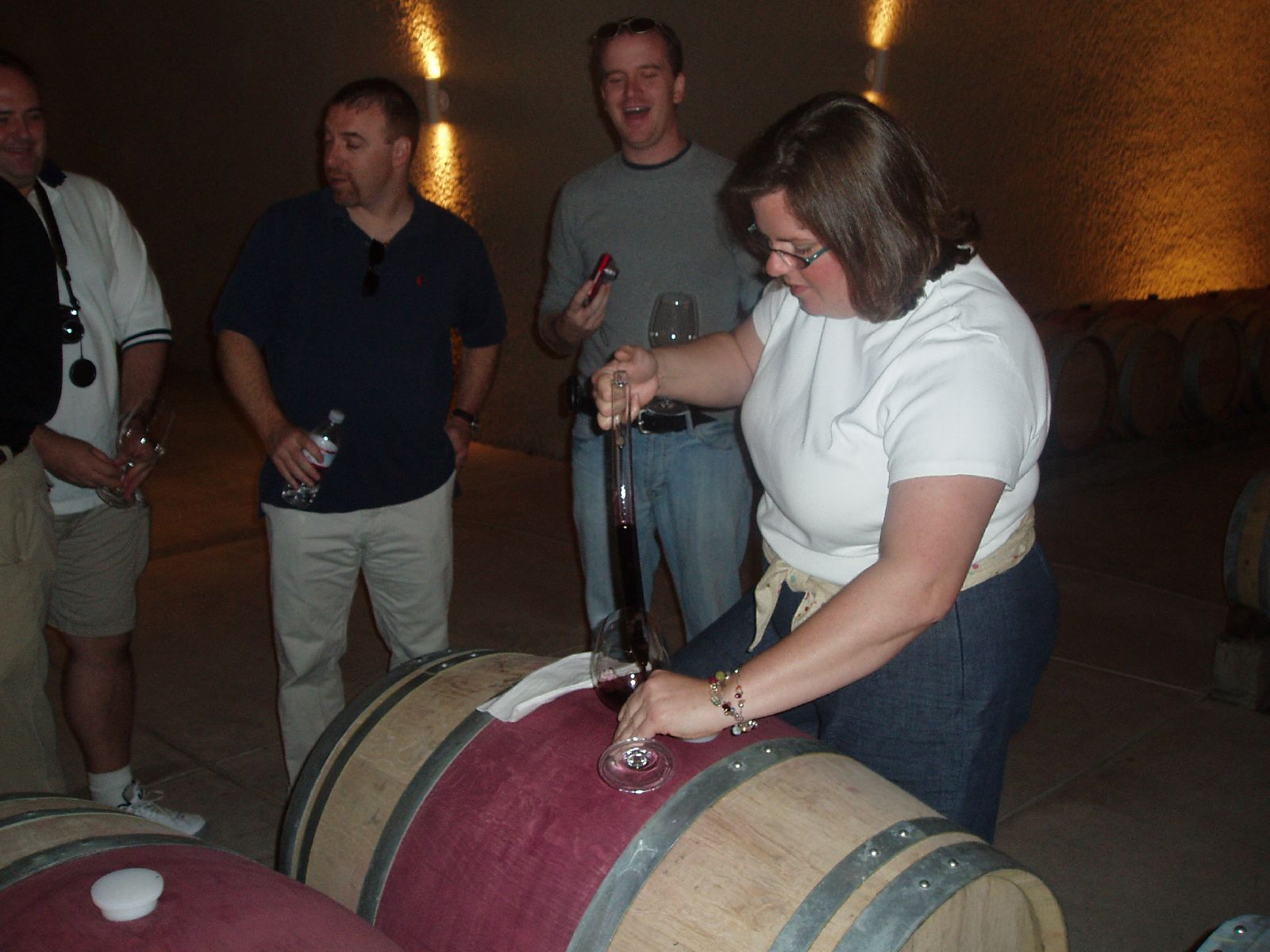
Barrel samples of the wines are tasted when the wine is between 6 and 8 months old with the wine then giving a preliminary score or rating that influences the en primeur price.

In the spring after a year long harvest, merchants and trade organizations will taste barrel samples of wine that are often only 6–8 months old. In the case of Bordeaux, where the final wine is often a blend of several grape varieties, the winemaker will try to craft an approximate blend to sample. The composition of the final wine may differ from the sample depending on how each barrel matures during the aging process. Based on the initial sample, the wines will be given a preliminary "score" or wine rating based on the expected quality of the wine once it is bottled, released and has had time to mature.

An en primeur wine gives the owner the right to receive the respective bottles of wine once the producer has completed the maturing phase of the wine. Wine bought en primeur is often directly placed into custom-free storage holding, 'in bond'. Known as a delicate method of investment, a purchase may ultimately be deemed a loss, or there may be considerable profit. For example, the 1982 vintage of Château Latour, was sold at £250 a case en primeur in 1983, while valued in 2007 at £9,000, although the major part of this price increase occurred after bottling.

=== Potential benefits ===
En primeur can mean the producer is able to benefit from an improved cash flow system and a guaranteed exclusive, potentially high level sale of their product. This concept has existed in Bordeaux for centuries and was only occasionally used in other areas such as Burgundy, Piedmont, Tuscany, Ribera del Duero, and Rioja. In Italy some work is being done to promote the development of an Italian en primeur market.

For the consumer, purchasing en primeur gives them the opportunity to secure wines that may have very limited quantities and be difficult to buy after they are released. As with all investments the consumer is advised to use caution. The incidents of fraud in the "en primeur" market have been significant both in the US and in the UK and in the wine investment sector in general, where many have queried the (lack of) requirements to set up an investment firm. In favorable vintages some classified Bordeaux estates can have nearly all of the year's inventory allocated or purchased before the wine is released. The purchase price during the en primeur period may also be lower than the price the wine will be once it is released.

In April 2009, the 2008 en primeur from Bordeaux was released, priced at 30% less (on average) when compared to the previous year. This has created a huge buying frenzy within the market and investment opportunity has grown. Subsequently, the record release prices of the 2009 and 2010 vintages tested the resolve of the En Primeur market. Failure to re-adjust prices in the following two years effectively killed demand and many who bought into the 2009s and 10s were facing losses during the following four years. However the market has now turned and buying en primeur has become attractive once more. Indeed, those who bought into top wines of the 2014 vintage are now reporting average ROI of +13.4% with the wines soon to be released in bottle.

== See also ==
- United Cellars
