= Antonio Galloni =

American wine critic

- Occupation: Wine critic
- Writing career
- Subject: Wine

Antonio Galloni is an American wine critic. He is the founder and chief executive officer (CEO) of Vinous for which he is also the lead critic covering the wines of Bordeaux, California, Italy, and Champagne.

From 2006 to 2013, Galloni was a tasting staff member of Robert Parker's publication The Wine Advocate.

In May 2013, Galloni founded Vinous.

== Early life and education ==
Galloni was born in Caracas, Venezuela to an Italian father and American mother. When he was eleven the family moved to Sarasota, Florida where his parents sold Italian wines at retail. This early exposure to wine began a lifelong fascination with wine. Galloni's maternal grandmother introduced him to the wines of Burgundy, while his father instilled in him that "there are two great wines in the world: Barolo and Champagne".

Galloni received a degree from Boston's Berklee College of Music in jazz composition and guitar. After a stint as a musician and waiter, which led him to get to know many of the new California wineries of the time, he took a job with Putnam Investments and was soon after sent to Putnam's Milan office. This opportunity was a total immersion in Italian wine and culture. Galloni returned to the United States to acquire a formal business education, where he earned an MBA from the MIT Sloan School of Management.

== Career ==
In 2004, while studying for an MBA at MIT's Sloan School of Management, Galloni began publication of the Piedmont Report newsletter profiling the wine of Piedmont. At the time the only critic who had been writing about the wines of Italy in English was James Suckling. Within weeks Piedmont Report had subscribers in more than 25 countries and quickly established itself as the premier guide in the world for Piedmont wines. Galloni turned down an offer to write for Robert Parker's The Wine Advocate to work for a brief stint at Deutsche Bank in New York City.

In 2006, he accepted Parker's offer to join The Wine Advocate as a reviewer of Italian wine, and became a contributor to Parker's Wine Buyer’s Guide.

In January 2011, as Parker restructured the coverage of his staff of reviewers and announced he would no longer review California wine, Galloni's area of coverage was expanded to include California, Champagne, Chablis and the Côte d'Or.

Galloni has stated in The Wine Advocate issue 186 that he will only review Champagne that provides a disgorgement date so he may accurately rate a Champagne by its release.

In 2013, Antonio left The Wine Advocate to start his own website, Vinous. At the time of his departure, Galloni was the lead critic at The Wine Advocate, and had authored one-third of the reviews published by TWA in 2012. Galloni also ran the world's most followed bulletin board on Italian wines and spearheaded TWA’s production of video content. He developed tailored public events & seminars such as the highly-anticipated “La Festa del Barolo,” vertical tastings focused on the benchmark wines of Italy, and numerous charity dinners.

=== Vinous ===
In February 2013, following the announcement by Parker that he was stepping down as editor-in-chief of The Wine Advocate and had sold a controlling stake to a Singapore investor, Galloni announced himself that he would leave the publication and establish his own internet publication, launched under the brand Vinous. Aimed towards a broader demographic of wine consumers, Galloni has stated he would continue to report on the wines of Italy, Champagne, California and Burgundy and will cover wines from Bordeaux from the 2013 vintage, as well as craft spirits.

Vinous has since acquired Stephen Tanzer's International Wine Cellar and the apps Delectable and Banquet.

== Lawsuit ==
In March 2013, it was reported that The Wine Advocate had filed a federal lawsuit against Galloni five weeks after his departure for breach of contract, fraud and defamation. The lawsuit, filed in U.S. District Court in Maryland, advancing the complaint, was never served. All the articles cited in the case have subsequently appeared on Galloni's Vinous Media website.

According to Robert Parker, The Wine Advocate’s efforts were “simply a matter of retrieving a service we paid for,” rather than “an attempt to stop Antonio from moving on; we continue to wish him our very best.”

== See also ==
- List of wine personalities
