= Clive Coates =

British wine writer (1941–2022)

- Born: 21 October 1941; Wimbledon, London, England
- Died: 26 July 2022 (aged 80); Lyon, France
- Occupation: Writer
- Writing career
- Subject: Wine
- Website: www.clive-coates.com

Clive Coates (21 October 1941 – 26 July 2022) was a British wine writer and Master of Wine, best known for his books about the wines of Burgundy.

== Biography ==
Born in Wimbledon, London on 21 October 1941, Coates worked for The Wine Society in Stevenage in the late 1960s and early 1970s. In 1975 he founded the award-winning magazine The Vine, a monthly fine wine journal that ran for 241 issues until ill-health in 2005 forced him to stop. He also wrote a number of classic books about the classic wine regions of France in this time. Despite describing himself as semi retired, he published his latest book, The Wines of Burgundy in March 2008.

Coates lived in Saint-Bonnet-de-Vieille-Vigne, between the Côte Chalonnaise and the Mâconnais. He died after a long illness at a hospital in Lyon, on 26 July 2022, at the age of 80.

== Bibliography ==
He is best known for Côte d'Or: A Celebration of the Great Wines of Burgundy, a survey of the most famous wine-producing region of Burgundy covering more than 1000 pages, published in 1997. It includes technical information about the vineyards of the Côte-d'Or, details about wine making techniques employed by hundreds of different producers and wine ratings of thousands of wines. The new book from 2008 is effectively a revision of this one, but expanded to include all major wine districts of Burgundy, and without the in-depth profile of a selected number of producers in the 1997 book.

Other recent books include The Wines of Bordeaux (2004) and The Great Wines of France (2005).

== See also ==
- List of wine personalities
- Coates Law of Maturity
