= Wines in bond =

Wines in bond are purchased wines held in a bonded warehouse, which have not passed through customs, with no Duty and VAT paid on them.

Wine brokers and merchants will often buy wine in bond because it saves having to pay VAT and Duty on the wines if they are most likely going to be resold. Under UK law, they must be stored in a bonded warehouse approved by HM Revenue and Customs.

== See also ==
- Bonded warehouse
- Investment wine
