= Wine rating =

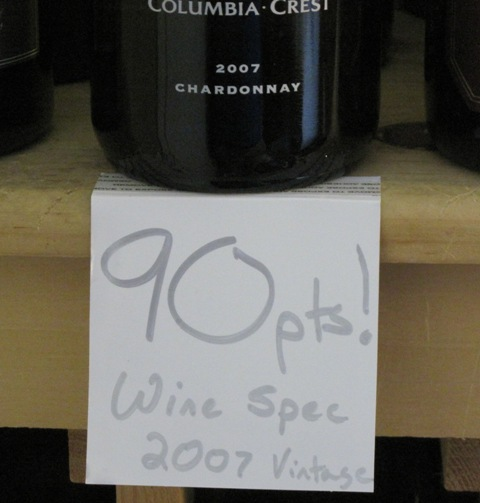
Retailers will often use signage advertising wines that have received a favorable rating from critics.

A wine rating is a score assigned by one or more wine critics to a wine tasted as a summary of that critic's evaluation of that wine. A wine rating is therefore a subjective quality score, typically of a numerical nature, given to a specific bottle of wine. In most cases, wine ratings are set by a single wine critic, but in some cases a rating is derived by input from several critics tasting the same wine at the same time. A number of different scales for wine ratings are in use. Also, the practices used to arrive at the rating can vary. Over the last couple of decades, the 50–100 scale introduced by Robert M. Parker, Jr. has become commonly used. This or numerically similar scales are used by publications such as Wine Enthusiast, Wine Spectator, and Wine Advocate. Other publications or critics, such as Jancis Robinson and Michael Broadbent, may use a 0–20 scale, or a 0–5 scale (often in terms of numbers of stars) either with or without half-star steps.

In recent years, with the advent of aggregated user-generated ratings, there has also proliferated group rating systems, such as the one employed by CellarTracker, using input from non-professional wine tasters who taste under differing conditions. In addition to a simple numerical score, most wine ratings are meant to supplement the wine tasting notes, which are brief descriptions of the wine critic's overall impression of the wine, including its flavor qualities. However, often the emphasis (in particular in marketing) is on the score applied by a critic rather than on the total wine tasting note.

== History ==
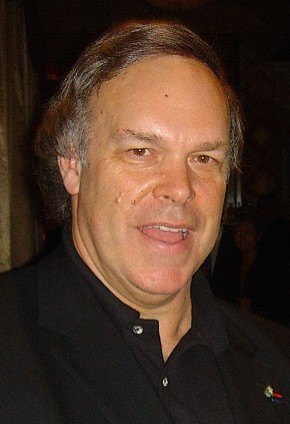
American wine critic Robert Parker is credited with popularizing the use of numerical wine ratings.

While the composition of tasting notes and other forms of wine literature has existed throughout the history of wine, the widespread use of numerical rating systems is a relatively recent phenomenon. During the mid 20th century, as American interest in wine was developing, consumers found themselves being introduced to a wide assortment of wines from across the globe. This surplus of available options created a niche market for critics who could provide a service in reviewing wines and making recommendations that could make the buying process easier for consumers. Following a pattern similar to the product reviews of such consumer magazines like Consumer Reports and Which?, American critics began writing more condensed wine reviews that consumers could scan through briefly to identify wines of interest. The popularization of numerical scoring is widely credited to the American wine critic Robert Parker who patterned his system of numerical ratings on the American standardized grading system in the 1970s.

Under Parker's system, wines were evaluated on a 50–100 scale that roughly correlated to an A–F "grade" on the wine. A wine was considered "above average" or "good" if it got a score of at least 85 points. Readers of wine rating magazines such as Parker's The Wine Advocate, or its later imitators such as Wine Spectator and The Wine Enthusiast, could quickly at a glance see a review of several dozen or even hundreds of available wines broken down into numerical evaluations. These consumers could isolate a range of scores to concentrate their buying purchase on without ever having to try a wine beforehand. Similarly, wine retailers and merchants found themselves with a ready made marketing tool that didn't even require them to research or sample the wine before they put it on sale.

The popularity of numerical wine ratings became a boon for the wine retailing industry. Wines that received scores classified as "outstanding" (usually 90 points or above) were essentially guaranteed favorable sales in the market. Wines that received "extraordinary" or "classic" ratings of 95–100 began to develop cult followings that, coupled with the limited production, helped to skyrocket their prices. A segment of investment wine emerged that aimed to capitalize on the speculation and eventual price increase surrounding highly scoring wines. The influence of wine ratings was particularly keen in the developing wine markets of Asia, Russia and South America at the turn of the 21st century.

== Criticism ==
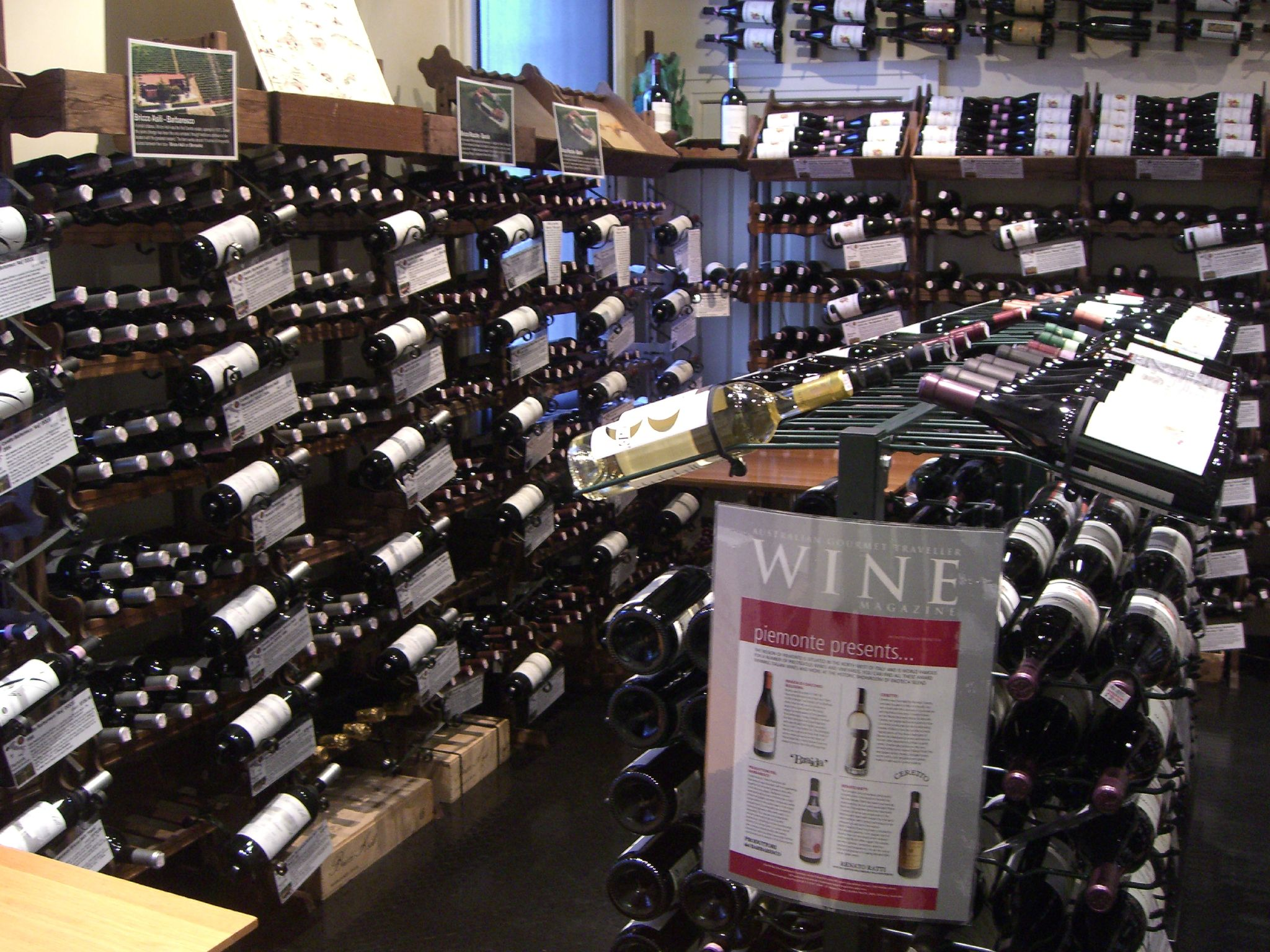
Critics of numerical wine ratings have contended that the popularity and marketing power of these ratings have contributed to a homogenization of wine styles being offered on the market.

The numerical wine rating system has been heavily criticized. It has been considered a driving force in the globalization of wine and the downplaying of the influence of terroir and individuality in wine making. Critics of the wine rating system contend that the economic and marketing power of receiving favorable scores by influential critics has steered global winemaking towards producing a homogeneous style that is perceived as appealing to the critics. These critics point to what they contend is an inherent flaw in sampling a wide assortment of wines at once. When compared together, wines (particularly red) that have deep colors, full bodied, stronger, concentrated flavors and smooth mouthfeel tend to stand out from the assortment more than wines with more subtle characteristics. These wines tend to receive more favorable wine ratings which have led to an increase in the proliferation of these styles of wines on the market.
