= The Wine Advocate =

US periodical

- Categories: Wine newsletter
- Frequency: Bi-monthly
- Publisher: Robert Parker Wine Advocate
- First issue: August 1978
- Country: United States
- Based in: Maryland
- Language: English
- Website: www.robertparker.com
- ISSN: 0887-8463

The Wine Advocate, fully known as Robert Parker's Wine Advocate and informally abbreviated TWA or WA or more recently as RP, is a bimonthly wine publication based in the United States featuring the consumer advice of wine critic Robert M. Parker, Jr.

Initially titled The Baltimore-Washington Wine Advocate the first issue was published in 1978. Accepting no advertising, the newsletter publishes in excess of 12,000 reviews per year, utilizing Parker's rating system that employs a 50–100 point quality scale (Parker Points® or simply RP). These wine ratings have a significant effect on the sales of the reviewed wine.

== Background and history ==
Robert Parker first developed an interest in wine on a trip to France while in college studying law. In the 1970s, Parker was influenced by the activist consumerism philosophy of Ralph Nader and saw in the wine industry a lack of independent wine criticism that was not sponsored by the distributors or wineries being reviewed. He released his first edition of The Baltimore-Washington Wine Advocate in 1978, originally as a complimentary bi-monthly feature. It soon changed to a subscription periodical and by 1984 was successful enough that Parker could quit practicing law full-time and focus on wine reviews.

Parker and The Wine Advocate first garnered international, mainstream attention for his early prediction of the superiority and quality of the 1982 vintage of Bordeaux wine. Parker's enthusiastic endorsement created a spike of interest from American wine buyers in purchasing wine futures of this vintage, prior to its release to the public. This had the effect of raising the price dramatically for 1982 Bordeaux wines. Subscriptions to The Wine Advocate continued to grow and by 1998 had more than 45,000 subscribers from 35 countries. In 2000, an online version of the magazine was introduced, eRobertParker.com, which expanded the publication beyond Wine Advocate content to include an interactive Bulletin Board managed by Mark Squires and many articles and features not available in the printed version. By 2012, subscribership had grown to about 50,000, with 80% of readers from in the United States.

== Transformation in 2012–2013 ==
As of December 2012, many changes were announced concerning the management and format of The Wine Advocate following the sale of a majority stake in the publication to investors from Singapore. A transition from print to fully on-line distribution was announced, to take effect before the end of 2013. The role of editor-in-chief went from Parker to Lisa Perrotti-Brown, a Singapore-based correspondent for the publication. A second editorial office was opened in Singapore.

Following lead critic Antonio Galloni's departure from The Wine Advocate in February 2013, three new critics were recruited adding to what Robert Parker called his "Dream Team". Jeb Dunnuck joined the publication on April 3, 2013, followed by Monica Larner and Luis Gutiérrez on April 23, 2013.

On 22 November 2019 it was announced that Michelin Guide became the sole owner of The Wine Advocate.

=== Team of Reviewers ===
Starting in 2001, Parker started to delegate many of the world's wine regions to a team of critics.

Joe Czerwinski reviews the wines of Provence, the Rhône Valley (North and South), Languedoc-Roussillon, Australia and New Zealand.

Luis Gutiérrez (wine critic) covers the wines of Spain, Chile, the Jura and Argentina.

Monica Larner is responsible for reviewing the wines of Italy.

William Kelley reviews the wines of Burgundy, Chablis, Beaujolais, Champagne, Madeira and English Sparkling Wine.

Lisa Perrotti-Brown, MW reviews the wines of Bordeaux, Napa Valley and Sonoma County.

Stephan Reinhardt reviews the wines of Germany, Austria, Switzerland, Alsace and Loire Valley

Erin Brooks reviews the wines of Oregon, Sonoma County and California Central Coast.

Anthony Mueller reviews the wines of Washington State and South Africa.

Liwen Hao covers Asia.

Mark Squires oversees the Mark Squires' Bulletin Board at RobertParker.com and reviews the wines of Portugal, Israel, Greece, Romania and Bulgaria.

Previous Wine Advocate critics include Pierre Rovani, Jeb Dunnuck, Daniel Thomases, Jay Miller and Antonio Galloni.

== Influence on the wine industry ==
While not the first American wine publication, nor the first to use a numerical wine ratings scale, The Wine Advocate was the first to widely adopt the 50-100 point scale and use it as parallel to the American educational grading system. This system was familiar to Robert Parker's original target audience—the average American consumer—and provided a guideline for quantifying a wine's quality in a standardize format. Retailers have used The Wine Advocate's "Parker scores" to aggressively market wines with high scores. The scores have also become focal points for collectors and wine investors who purchase highly rated wines in the hopes that the Parker scores will increase the value of the wine.

Throughout various wine regions, most notably Bordeaux, The Wine Advocate early vintage evaluation-sampled while the wine is still in oak barrels—can have a dramatic effect on the eventual prices of all the region's wine upon their release. Individual scores of wine can also affect whether or not distributors or retailers will order the wine to sell with some retailers refusing to order wine rated below 85 points.

== Wine Advocate Fund ==
The Wine Advocate also operates The Wine Advocate Fund For Philanthropy, a nonprofit organization that raises money primarily for cancer research. In 2008 the Fund hosted a $10,000 per plate charity dinner where the publication's 100-rated wines were served. In 2006 a similar dinner raised $1.3 million.

== Criticisms ==
The influence of The Wine Advocate on the demand and commercial interest of wine has met with some criticism, with wineries being accused of making wines tailored to Parker's tastes. In the late 1980s, wine expert Jancis Robinson noted that Parker and The Wine Advocate were "... in danger of controlling the international fine wine market". The subject of scoring of The Wine Advocate scoring has also been criticized by wine writers, such as Hugh Johnson, who stated that wine tasting and evaluation are intrinsically subjective, with the wine having the potential to dramatically change and evolve over time. The Wine Advocate publishes on the cover of every issues its philosophy that "...wine is no different from any consumer product. There are specific standards of quality that full time wine professionals recognize".

The effects of The Wine Advocate scores can be pronounced in the retail sphere, with wine rated above 90 points usually selling well while those even in the 85–89 range, which is rated "good to very good", are often ignored by consumers.
