= Robert Parker (wine critic) =

American wine critic

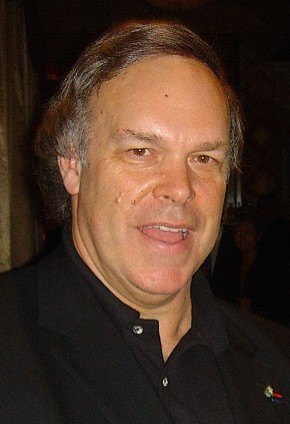
- Parker in 2005
- Born: Robert McDowell Parker Jr. July 23, 1947 (age 79); Baltimore, Maryland, U.S.
- Occupation: Wine critic
- Writing career
- Subject: Wine
- Notable awards: Officier de l'Ordre de la Légion d'honneur, Gran Cruz de la Orden del Mérito Civil

Robert McDowell Parker Jr. (born July 23, 1947) is a retired American wine critic. His wine ratings on a 100-point scale and his newsletter The Wine Advocate are influential in American wine buying and are therefore a major factor in setting the prices for newly released Bordeaux wines. This made him the most widely known and influential wine critic in the world.

== Biography ==
Parker was born in Baltimore, Maryland. His father was a construction equipment salesman. He has an honors graduate of the University of Maryland, College Park, with a major in history and a minor in art history. He continued his education at University of Maryland School of Law at the urban campus of the University of Maryland, Baltimore, graduating in 1973 with a Juris Doctor degree. He discovered wine as a student visiting Alsace, where Patricia, now his wife, was studying. For over ten years, he was assistant general counsel for the Farm Credit Banks of Baltimore; he resigned in March 1984 to focus on writing about wine.

In 1975, Parker began writing a wine guidebook. Taking his cue from consumer advocate Ralph Nader, Parker wanted to write about wine without the conflicts of interest that might taint the opinions of other critics who also make a living selling wine. In 1978, he published a direct-mail newsletter called The Baltimore-Washington Wine Advocate, which was later renamed The Wine Advocate. The first issue was sent free to consumers from mailing lists Parker purchased from several major wine retailers. Six hundred charter subscribers paid to receive the second issue published later that year.

Parker received worldwide attention when he called the 1982 vintage in Bordeaux superb, contrary to the opinions of many other critics, such as San Francisco critic Robert Finigan, who felt it was too low-acid and ripe. While there is still debate about the timelessness of the vintage, prices of 1982 Bordeaux remain consistently higher than other vintages.

More than twenty years later, The Wine Advocate has over 50,000 subscribers, primarily in the United States, but with significant readership in over 37 other countries. While other wine publications have more subscribers, The Wine Advocate is still considered to exert a significant influence on wine consumers' buying habits, particularly in America. New York Times wine critic Frank Prial asserted that "Robert M. Parker Jr. is the most influential wine critic in the world."

A lengthy profile of Parker entitled "The Million Dollar Nose" ran in The Atlantic Monthly in December 2000. Among other claims, Parker told the author that he tastes 10,000 wines a year and "remembers every wine he has tasted over the past thirty-two years and, within a few points, every score he has given as well." Yet, in a public blind tasting of fifteen top wines from Bordeaux 2005—which he has called "the greatest vintage of my lifetime"—Parker could not correctly identify any of the wines, confusing left bank wines for right several times. (In general, "left bank" wines are grown in regions west of the Gironde Estuary, and "right bank" in the regions east.)

In addition to writing and tasting for The Wine Advocate, which is published six times a year in Monkton, Maryland, Parker has been a contributing editor for Food and Wine Magazine and BusinessWeek. He has also written periodically for the British magazine The Field and has been the wine critic for France's L'Express magazine, the first time a non-Frenchman has held this position.

Among the books and films that have focused on the influence and effects of Parker on the global wine industry are the 2004 book The Accidental Connoisseur, by Lawrence Osborne, the 2004 documentary film Mondovino by Jonathan Nossiter, a 2005 unauthorized biography The Emperor of Wine by Elin McCoy, the 2008 book The Battle for Wine and Love: Or How I Saved the World from Parkerization by Alice Feiring, and the 2010 French language bande dessinée comic book, Robert Parker: Les Sept Pêchés capiteux.

Parker's nose and palate are insured for $1 million.

Parker disclosed at the end of 2012 that he would sell a "substantial interest" in his newsletter and step down as editor in chief. His new partners were a trio of Singapore-based hedge fund investors. Parker formally retired from The Wine Advocate at the age of 71 in 2019.

== Impact on the world of wine ==
=== A new role for the wine critic ===
Until the 1970s, wine criticism was usually complementary to the production or trade of wine. The conflict of interest that might ensue from this close relationship was accepted by consumers, as they consulted wine reviews to gain an introduction to the world of wine, and not necessarily for advice on getting good value for their money. Hence, before Robert Parker, wine critics almost always had some link to the production or trade of wines.

Two wine critics were particularly influential in inspiring and defining Robert Parker:

- Robert Lawrence Balzer's charisma inspired Parker. Like his contemporaries, Balzer rarely wrote negative statements about wines. He even once published a book under his name that had actually been written by wine grower Paul Masson.
- Robert Finigan was Parker's forerunner in consumer-oriented wine reviewing. In the monthly Robert Finigan's Private Guide to Wine, launched in 1972, Finigan offered consumer-oriented, independent wine criticism, just as Parker did after him. Finigan helped consumers make decisions by developing standard evaluation criteria; his qualitative comments were straightforward and understandable, and each wine was ranked on a quality scale (exceptional, above average, average, below average).

Parker is a consumer advocate who admires Ralph Nader and has been critical of most wine critics, who traditionally have been part of the wine industry and have had vested interests.

According to Mike Steinberger, Parker has inadvertently made becoming a wine critic in the future almost impossible, since— in part because of the success of his scoring system—it is now prohibitively expensive to taste the very wines one should criticize. If it behooves a critic to understand, say, Château Lafite 1982, 2000, 2003, and 2005 before assessing the latest vintage: the critic must drink wine worth tens of thousands of dollars before beginning the review.

=== 100-point rating system ===
One of the most influential and controversial features of Parker's wine criticism is his 100-point rating system, which he popularized in conjunction with his friend Victor Morgenroth. Parker designed the system to counter what he believed to be confusing or inflated ratings by other wine writers—many of whom he accused of a conflict of interest, as they often had a financial interest in the wines they rated. The scale, now widely imitated in other publications (such as Wine Spectator), ranks wine on a scale from 50 to 100 points based upon the wine's color and appearance, aroma and bouquet, flavor and finish, and overall quality level or potential. Therefore, 51 rather than 100 different ratings are possible. Although some critics, such as Jancis Robinson, argue that numerical rating systems are questionable—given the subjectivity of wine tasting and the variance in scores that a wine's age and the circumstances of tasting can cause—similar 100-point scoring systems are widely used by American reviewers. Many British reviewers, such as Jancis Robinson and Clive Coates, still prefer a 20-point system.

Retailers in North America often mark wines with Parker's point scores, using printed cards attached to the shelves. Parker cautions buyers that they should read the tasting notes to determine whether or not the wine is made in a style they will like; he states on his website:

Scores, however, do not reveal the important facts about a wine. The written commentary that accompanies the ratings is a better source of information regarding the wine's style and personality, its relative quality vis-à-vis its peers, and its value and aging potential than any score could ever indicate.

— Robert M. Parker Jr., The Wine Advocate Rating System (emphasis in original)

No scoring system is perfect, but a system that provides for flexibility in scores, if applied by the same taster without prejudice, can quantify different levels of wine quality and provide the reader with one professional's judgment. However, there can never be any substitute for your own palate nor any better education than tasting the wine yourself.

— Robert M. Parker Jr., The Wine Advocate Rating System (emphasis in original)

Parker argues that he scores wines on how much pleasure they give him. He, and others, have said that it is the obscurity, corruption, and other problems of the appellation system that made his consumer-oriented approach necessary. For example, the Bordeaux Wine Official Classification of 1855 was based entirely upon the château's reputation and trading price in 1855. However, since then many châteaux have sold much of their vineyards; others have bought additional vineyards far away. The original winemakers are long dead. Parker says that this state of affairs was responsible for creating an injustice for consumers, causing mediocre wine to be sold at too high a price, and good wine to be sold at too low a price. He says of the 1855 classifications, "At most, these classifications should be regarded by both the wine connoisseur and novice as informational items of historical significance only."

Parker has admitted that emotions do matter, contrary to the seeming objectivity of the 100-point scale: "I really think probably the only difference between a 96-, 97-, 98-, 99-, and 100-point wine is really the emotion of the moment."

Parker is considered an unusually fast taster, and during an initial assessment he may keep a wine in his mouth for only four or five seconds before determining whether it is potentially a wine of 80 points or above. Mediocre wines will then be dismissed while those with potential are tasted twice or three times in succession before the final score is determined.

=== Impact on the supply: the "Parkerization" of wine ===
Parker's impact on the style of fine wines has generated controversy. Parker is critical of "those who make 'industrial wines with little flavor and no authenticity'" and he believes that there are still undiscovered regions and wines that can successfully challenge the wine establishment. Critics such as Golo Weber claim that Parker likes riper, less acidic wines with significant amounts of oak, alcohol, and extract. This supposed "Parker taste" may be less the result of Parker's own preferences than of a trend initiated by Émile Peynaud, the French oenologist and father of the so-called "international wines". In the 1970s, winemakers avoided the late harvests, when the grapes were mature, in order to avoid the risks of end-of-season rains. Peynaud proposed that winemakers should wait to harvest until the grape was fully mature, or even over-mature. He also insisted on control of malolactic fermentation through the use of stainless steel vessels.

The domination of the oenological press by Parker's ideas has led to changes in viticulture and winemaking practices, such as reducing yield by green harvesting, harvesting grapes as late as possible for maximum ripeness, not filtering the wine, and using new techniques—such as microoxygenation—to soften tannins. These widespread changes in technique have been called "Parkerization", also sometimes known as "The International Style", and have led to fear of a homogenization of wine styles around the world as Parker's "tastes are irrevocably changing the way some French wines are made", according to the BBC's Caroline Wyatt. Indeed, certain low-producing "boutique" wineries, among others, have received high scores from Parker for wines made in this style. Parker disputes the notion of growing homogeneity and argues for the opposite: "When I started tasting wines, in the 1970s, we were on a slippery slope. There was a standardization of wines, where you couldn't tell a Chianti from a cabernet. That's pretty much stopped now."

Jacques Hébrard, the manager of Château Cheval Blanc, was once outraged at Parker's evaluation and asked Parker to re-taste the wine. Upon his return, Hébrard's dog attacked Parker as the manager stood by idly and watched. Parker says that when he asked for a bandage to stop the bleeding from his leg, Hébrard instead gave him a copy of the offending newsletter. Hebrard denies that Parker was bleeding. Wine critic Prial says "The Bordeaux wine establishment feels threatened by these new-style wines... and is engaged in an increasingly bitter fight against Parker and his influence."

=== Impact on the market ===
==== Impact on prices ====
There is evidence that Parker's rating scale has a dual effect on prices and sales, with claims from the wine industry that a Parker top score is valued at potentially £5 million.

- When Parker declined to review the 2002 Bordeaux vintage "in barrel," the vintners were forced to drop their prices.
- According to one Bordeaux shipper cited by McCoy, "the difference between a score of 85 and 95 [for one wine] was 6 to 7 million Euro", and a "bottle rated 100 can multiply its price fourfold."
- Château Quinault, which used to have hard time selling its wine at 100 francs a bottle, saw its 1998 vintage rise in price in half a day to 125 francs after Parker gave it a 92 rating.
- According to a 2005 economic analysis, Parker's scores would inflate the prices of already highly rated wines but, for the less good ones, it would not decrease their sales nor even increase their prices.

Whatever his influence, Parker alone cannot impact the market price for a wine if he is alone against the mainstream. The famous controversy around the Château Pavie 2003 is an example of this: despite Parker's positive ratings, the wine in bottle sold 30% cheaper than en primeur.

In a statistical analysis published in New Political Economy, political scientist Colin Hay suggests that Parker has a significant impact on the price of en primeur Bordeaux wines:

Taking the Saint-Émilion grands crus, for instance, Parker ratings alone account for 33 per cent of the variance in release price and a staggering 50 per cent of the variance in increase in release price between 2004 and 2005. Very similar effects are seen for the Médoc classed growths, with Parker score alone accounting, again, for just over a third of the total variance in release price and 38 per cent of the variance in increase in release price between these consecutive vintages. Moreover, even if we control for position in the official classification, with which Parker ratings are strongly correlated, they account for an additional 8 per cent of the variance in release price and an additional 9 per cent of the variance in increase in release price.

Hay also argues that

Parker's ratings are more influential, and prices more sensitive to his en primeur scores, where—as in Saint-Émilion—the official system of classification is more flexible and less prestigious. But it also suggests how Parker scores may play a crucial role, alongside well-established and highly respected classification systems (as for instance in the Médoc), in building up and, in particular, restoring the reputations of châteaux generally regarded to have fallen below their official place in the classification. In this respect, rather than overturning local classificatory schema, Parker's external influence may well work in parallel with them.

Hay notes that Parker's influence on consumer preferences is not so great as it is on prices.

==== Creation of new market segments ====
Parker strongly influenced the creation of garagiste wines, created by a group of innovative winemakers in the Bordeaux region of France.

== Limits to influences ==
Parker is an avid fan of Bordeaux, and some of his critics observe that his focus is largely limited to French wine. In recent years, he has taken on additional staff for The Wine Advocate, which has enabled the publication to expand into other areas, such as Greek and Israeli wines. Still, his influence is most keenly felt by Bordeaux, California, and Rhône wines.

Parker's influence on Burgundy wines was lessened as the result of a libel lawsuit filed against him by Domaine Faiveley. In the third edition of his Wine Buyer's Guide, Parker reported that "the Faiveley wines tasted abroad would be less rich than those one can taste on the spot [...]". In other words, Parker accused Faiveley of cheating. Faiveley sued Parker for libel; in February 1994, Parker was requested to appear in front of the Paris superior court (tribunal de grande instance). The case was settled out of court. It was eventually discovered that the difference in taste that Parker identified was due to improper storage of the wine at the American importer's warehouse, causing the wine to be "cooked." Parker delegated coverage of the Burgundy and Alsace regions to Pierre-Antoine Rovani in April 1997.

=== Controversy ===
Parker has stated, both in The Wine Advocate and his books, that his advice stands on high ethical standards, and that independence and impartiality constitute his two most important values. By abiding by these standards, he says, he seeks to guarantee that his valuations will be pro-consumer, and not pro-industry.

Several published sources offer accounts that may call Parker's independence and impartiality into question.

In her book Emperor of Wine, Elin McCoy describes a positive article Parker wrote in the second issue of The Baltimore/Washington Wine Advocate about MacArthur Liquors and its manager, Addy Bassin. That article fails to mention that Mr. Bassin sold Parker a list of MacArthur's customers for use in mailing out the first, free issue of the Advocate, a potential conflict of interest.

In issue 164 of The Wine Advocate, Parker wrote a long article about Jeffrey Davies, a wine trader based in Bordeaux. As Hanna Agostini and Marie-Françoise Guichard point out in their book Robert Parker, Anatomy of a Myth, what Parker failed to mention was that he tasted wines with Davies, not by himself—yet Parker has repeatedly stated that an impartial wine critic should taste wines alone. Davies advised Parker not to publish his comments on the 2004 Bordeaux in issue 164, as Parker had planned, because they would have suffered from their comparison with the much better 2003 and 2005. Parker followed Davies' advice, and published those comments in the following issue instead.

The second issue of The Baltimore/Washington Wine Advocate stated "Robert Parker has no interest, direct or indirect, financial or any other, in importing, distributing or selling wines." In the late 1980s, Parker invested in an Oregon vineyard with his brother-in-law, Michael G. Etzel, called The Beaux Frères Vineyard ("The Brothers-in-Law"), which would soon after become a commercial winery under the same name. He promised never to review any wines produced there in The Wine Advocate.

Two of Parker's tasters had, or still have, an interest in the distribution or the sale of wines, according to published accounts.

- Until January 1, 2007, David Schildknecht spent half of his time importing and distributing wines, and the other half critiquing wine for The Wine Advocate. He subsequently became a full-time critic for The Wine Advocate.
- Kevin Zraly is the vice-president of Smith and Wollensky Restaurants, a group of 17 restaurants with a substantial wine list.

Robert Parker's goddaughter, Marie Raynaud, is the daughter of Alain Raynaud—the co-owner of Château la Croix-de-Gay in Pomerol and former owner of Château Quinault in Saint-Émilion. Mr. Raynaud was the President of the Union des Grands Crus de Bordeaux, an advocacy group for the Grand Crus of Bordeaux, between 1994 and 2000.

Yale University professor, econometrician, and lawyer Ian Ayres wrote about Robert Parker's conflict with Orley Ashenfelter, the publisher of Liquid Assets: The International Guide to Fine Wines, in his book Super Crunchers. Ashenfelter devised a formula for predicting wine quality based on weather data such as rainfall and temperature that Parker characterized as "ludicrous and absurd." Ashenfelter was able to show that Parker's initial ratings of vintages had been biased upward, requiring him to revise his rankings downward more often than not. Says Ayres, "Both the wine dealers and writers have a vested interest in maintaining their informational monopoly on the quality of wine." Ayres pointed out that Ashenfelter's predictions have proven to be remarkably accurate, and claimed the wine critics' "predictions now correspond much more closely to [Ashenfelter's] simple equation results."

The famous English wine writer Hugh Johnson, in his autobiography Wine: A Life Uncorked, noted the influence of Robert Parker, though not uncritically.

=== Awards and recognition ===
- 1993 – Chevalier de l'Ordre National du Mérite
- 1993 – Wine and Vine Communication Award from Moet-Hennessey
- 1995 – Declared Honorary Citizen of Chateauneuf du Pape
- 1997 – James Beard Foundation Wine and Spirits Professional of 1997
- 1999 – Chevalier de l'Ordre de la Légion d'honneur
- 2002 – Commendatore dell'Ordine al merito della Repubblica Italiana
- 2005 – Officier de la Légion d'honneur
- 2008 – Elected to the Wine Media Guild Hall of Fame
- 2010 – Gran Cruz de la Orden del Mérito Civil

Robert Parker is one of only a few foreigners to have received France's two highest Presidential honors, and is the first wine critic to have received such distinctions in France and in Italy. His Gran Cruz de Orden Civil from King Juan Carlos in August 2010 made him the first wine writer to receive Spain's highest civilian honor.

== Bibliography ==
- Parker, Robert M. Jr. (1987). The Wines of the Rhône Valley and Provence. Simon & Schuster. ISBN 978-0-671-63379-0.
- Parker, Robert M. Jr. (1990). Burgundy. Simon & Schuster. ISBN 978-0-671-63378-3.
- Parker, Robert M. Jr. (1997). The Wines of the Rhône Valley. Simon & Schuster. ISBN 978-0-684-80013-4.
- Parker, Robert M. Jr. (2003). Bordeaux (4th ed.). Simon & Schuster. ISBN 978-0-7432-2946-3.
- Parker, Robert M. Jr. (2005). The World's Greatest Wine Estates. Simon & Schuster. ISBN 978-0-7432-3771-0.
- Parker, Robert M. Jr. (2008). Parker's Wine Buyer's Guide (7th ed.). Simon & Schuster. ISBN 978-0-7432-7199-8.
- Parker, Robert M. Jr. (2009). Parker's Wine Bargains. Simon & Schuster. ISBN 978-1-4391-0190-2.

== Filmography ==
Year	Title	Role	Notes
2024	The Simpsons	Himself (voice)	Episode: "Bottle Episode"

== See also ==
- Garagistes
- List of wine professionals
- List of celebrities who own wineries and vineyards
