= Secondary fermentation (wine) =

Winemaking process

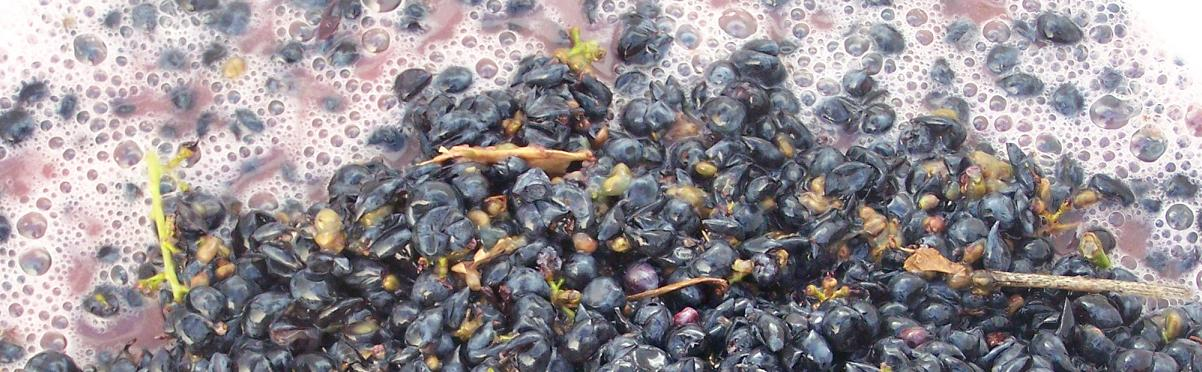
Fermentation during the maceration of red wine.

Secondary fermentation has several meanings in winemaking. In sparkling wine production, it is a further alcoholic fermentation that produces the wine's bubbles. The term is also used for malolactic fermentation, a bacterial process.

The term is also used in home winemaking for the stage after wine has been moved to another vessel, such as a carboy. This need not involve a separate fermentation.

== Sparkling wine ==
Fermentation in a sealed bottle or pressure tank retains the carbon dioxide produced by yeast, making the wine effervescent. The development of effervescence is known in French as prise de mousse.

=== Traditional method ===
In the traditional method, the second fermentation takes place in the bottle in which the wine will be sold. The base wine, which may be a blend, is bottled with liqueur de tirage, a mixture containing sugar and yeast. The bottle is closed with a temporary crown cap. Riddling agents may also be added to help collect the sediment. The bottles lie horizontally while the yeast converts sugar into alcohol and carbon dioxide.

The fermentation leaves a deposit of dead yeast cells, or lees. Riddling moves this sediment into the bottle's neck by gradually turning and tilting the bottle until it points downwards. During disgorging, the bottle is opened and the internal pressure expels the sediment. The neck may first be chilled to freeze the sediment into a plug. Wine lost during disgorging is replaced. A mixture of wine and sugar called liqueur d'expédition, or dosage, may then be added. This is distinct from the tirage mixture added before fermentation.

The method is used for Champagne and other sparkling wines. The European Union restricted the description méthode champenoise (Champagne method) in 1994. In 1662, Christopher Merret described English winemakers adding sugar to wine to make it sparkling.

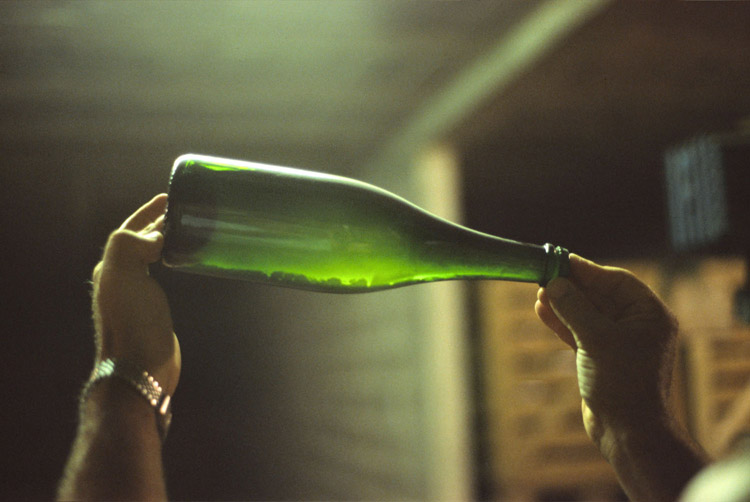
Yeast sediment in a bottle of Champagne before disgorging.

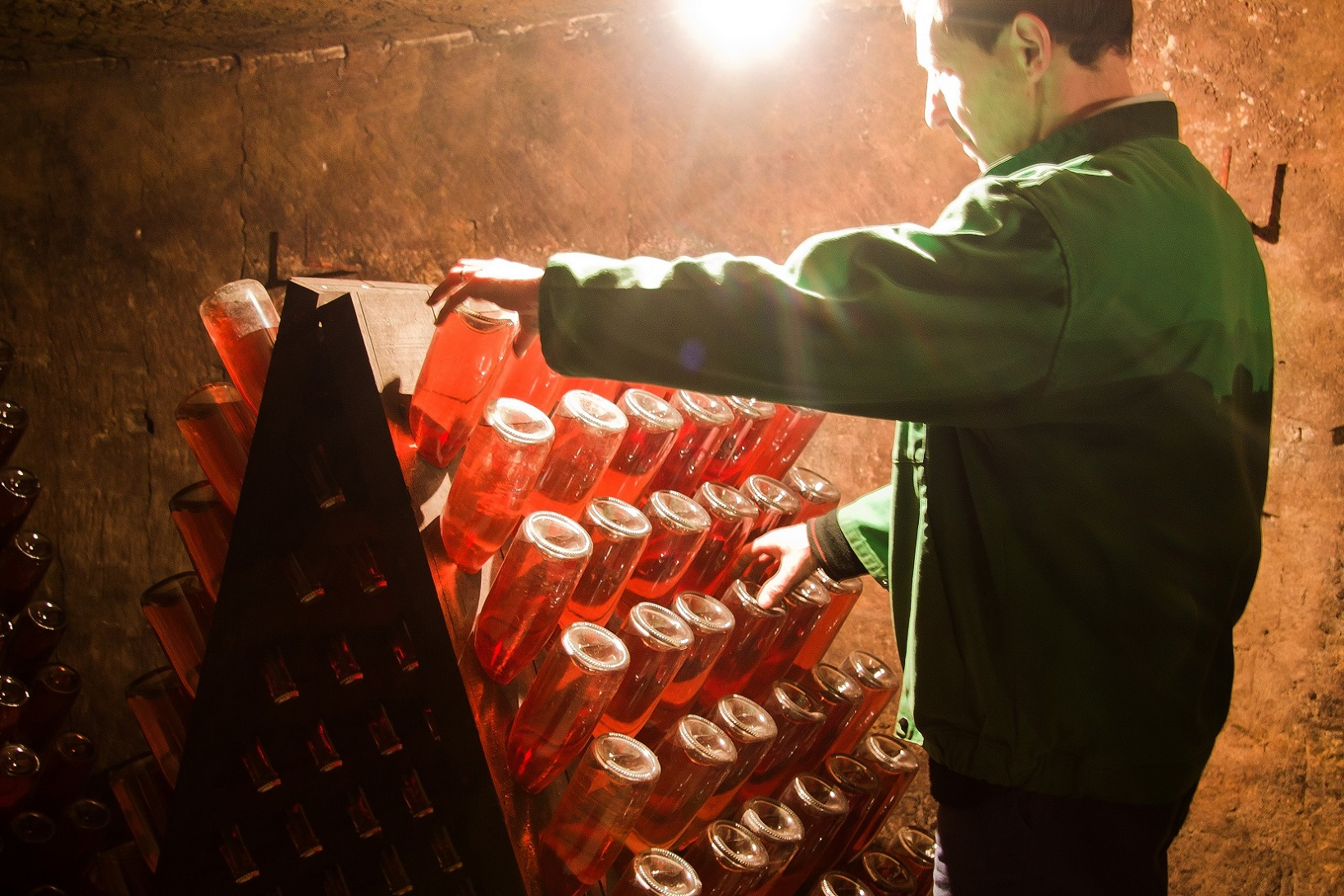
Bottles in riddling racks.

=== Transfer method ===
The transfer method also uses a second fermentation in bottles. The wine is then transferred to a tank, where the yeast sediment is filtered out in bulk, replacing the individual riddling and disgorging steps. Dosage is added before the wine is bottled again. Transfer and rebottling take place under pressure to retain the carbon dioxide.

=== Tank method ===
In the tank method, also called the Charmat or cuve close (closed tank) method, the second fermentation takes place in a pressure tank. Sugar and yeast are added to the base wine. The wine is filtered and bottled under pressure after fermentation. Federico Martinotti patented a method of fermentation in large containers in 1895. Eugène Charmat later developed the equipment. The tank method is used for many Prosecco wines.

=== Continuous method ===
In the continuous method, wine flows through a series of closed tanks in which yeast is retained. Fermentation takes place as the wine passes through the system. The finished wine is bottled under pressure.

== Other methods of producing effervescence ==
=== Ancestral method ===
In the ancestral method, or méthode ancestrale, wine is bottled before its initial alcoholic fermentation has finished. The remaining yeast ferments the grape sugars in the closed bottle, retaining the carbon dioxide. This continues the original fermentation rather than starting a separate one. Disgorging is optional. The method is used for some sparkling wines from Gaillac, Limoux and Cerdon.

==== Dioise method ====
The méthode dioise ancestrale, or Dioise ancestral method, is used for Clairette de Die in the Drôme valley. Fermentation begins in a chilled tank and continues in bottles, without adding a tirage mixture. Dosage is not added. The yeast sediment can be removed by cold filtration under pressure before rebottling.

=== Carbonation ===
Wine can also be made effervescent by injecting carbon dioxide and then bottling under pressure. This method does not use a further fermentation.

== Still wine ==
In still wine production, secondary fermentation can mean malolactic fermentation. It is used in most red wines and some white wines. Bacteria convert malic acid into the less acidic lactic acid.

A winemaker may restart a stuck fermentation by adding a fresh yeast culture. The wine may first be racked off its sediment. In the Tuscan governo method, slightly dried grapes are added to newly made wine to bring about a slow refermentation.

== See also ==
- Glossary of wine terms
