= Christie's World Encyclopedia of Champagne & Sparkling Wine =

Wine book by Tom Stevenson

- Second edition cover
- Author: Tom Stevenson, Essi Avellan
- Language: English
- Genre: Wine compendium
- Publisher: Absolute Press
- Publication date: November 2002
- Publication place: United Kingdom
- Media type: Print (hardcover)
- Pages: 352
- ISBN: 978-1-899791-89-7
- OCLC: 50434255
- Dewey Decimal: 641.2/224/03 22
- LC Class: TP555 .S753 2003

Christie's World Encyclopedia of Champagne & Sparkling Wine is an encyclopedia written by Tom Stevenson and Essi Avellan, published by Absolute Press, which is devoted to subjects relating to Champagne and sparkling wine. The foreword is written by Michael Broadbent. A smaller reduced version, Champagne & Sparkling Wine Guide, is published in the soft cover format.

When first published in 1998, the book became the only wine book to warrant a leader in a UK national newspaper (The Guardian, October 14, 1998), for the first time revealing a 17th-century document proving that the English used a second fermentation to convert still wines into sparkling at least six years before Dom Pérignon arrived at the Abbey of Hautvillers, and nearly 40 years before the French claim that sparkling Champagne was invented. Although Le Figaro accused Stevenson of "trying to burn Dom Pérignon", the French were prompt to award it The Best Wine Book of 1998 at the Salon International du Livre Gourmand in Périgueux.

Ranked among its "Top Ten Best Wine Books" by The Independent it has been characterised as "still the best guide to fizz", "authoritative, opinionated and comprehensive", and a vital purchase for any Champagne lover.

== Content ==
The book opens with "A Little History", accounting numerous occurrences throughout time of accidental sparkling wine, and the first documented evidence of a deliberately produced sparkling wine, as recorded by Christopher Merret. In Merret's eight-page paper "Some observations concerning the ordering of wines", which he presented to the newly formed Royal Society on December 17, 1662, he states "our wine-coopers of recent times use vast quantities of sugar and molasses to all sorts of wines to make them drink brisk and sparkling". Stevenson explains why the French did not have the technology to produce any sparkling wine in 1662, and how it was almost inevitable that the English did. He explains the paradox of "sparkling champaign", which is mentioned by George Etheredge in The Man of Mode in 1676, yet did not exist in France until the late 1690s. The documentary evidence presented is a significant aspect of Christie's World Encyclopedia of Champagne & Sparkling Wine, though only a part of it.

An overview of the six different methods of sparkling wine production is provided in "How Sparkling Wines Are Made", exploring the most important of these in the sections "A Step-by-Step Guide to Méthode Champenoise and "The Elusive Quality Factor". Argumenting that intrinsic quality exists beyond the personal preference of taste, Stevenson analyses what precisely contributes to the intrinsic quality of a sparkling wine, starting with establishing the vineyard, from site selection to the varieties of grape, and how they should be grown, harvested, and pressed, looking at ripeness levels and acidity, through every aspect of the production process.

Stevenson offers an argument why chaptalisation might actually contribute to Champagne's perceived "lean" structure. He discusses ideal fermentation temperatures to give a "fast and furious first fermentation" and a long "low-temperature second fermentation", the pros and cons of malolactic fermentation, what the assemblage is, how to obtain good mousse retention, the importance of small bubbles, what affects their size, the effects of autolysis, ageing on lees, adding a dosage and post-disgorgement ageing. Stevenson also tests out nine Riedel glasses on 100 different Champagnes and sparkling wines, offering his conclusions alongside Riedel's official design purpose.

The main section of this book consists of a country-by-country, region-by-region assessment of sparkling wines, with every producer rated on a 100-point scale, and all their wines given a star wine rating (three star maximum). Champagne receives the largest coverage, occupying 98 pages, but 10 other French regions (Alsace, Loire, Burgundy, Bordeaux, Limoux, others) receive 45 pages, while 141 pages covers the rest of the world (Germany, Italy, Spain, Portugal, United Kingdom, Switzerland, Austria, Southeast Europe, other European, South Africa, The United States, California, Others USA, Canada, South America, Australia, New Zealand, Asia). These pages hold technical data and the historical development of sparkling wines locally, as well as Stevenson's own critiques of the producers, the lowest rating of which is 35, demonstrating his policy to utilise all 100 points of the scale.
