= Tom Stevenson =

British wine writer and critic (born 1951)

- Tom Stevenson in March 2006
- Born: Tunbridge Wells, England
- Occupations: Author, wine writer, wine critic, wine judge

Tom Stevenson (born 1951) is a British wine writer and critic.

Stevenson is regarded as an expert on Champagne and Alsace wine. He has written 23 books.

== Career ==
Stevenson began writing for Decanter magazine in 1981, and during the mid-1980s he started The Sunday Telegraph Good Wine Guide. By 1991 was also writing for Wine & Spirit.

Stevenson's 1986 book Champagne and 1993 book The Wines of Alsace were very positively received. The former exposed the practice of In 1998, he wrote Christie's World Encyclopedia of Champagne & Sparkling Wine. This book published a 17th-century document for the first time proving the English used the secondary fermentation process before the French were claimed to have invented champagne, although describing this as the British invented champagne has been criticised as unscholarly. Stevenson's The Sotheby's Wine Encyclopedia, first published in 1988, had sold 750,000 copies in more than a dozen languages as of 2011. Despite receiving some very positive reviews, it has been criticised for its accuracy. In addition to the books authored by Stevenson, he conceived and edited the Wine Report. It was published annually between 2003 and 2008, and was cancelled as the high fees of having forty-five, occasionally notable authors made the book unprofitable.

From its inception in 2004 to 2012, Stevenson held the chair of Champagne panel of the Decanter World Wine Awards. He has judged at wine competitions in Australia, France, Germany, Greece, Italy, South Africa, the UK and the USA. In 2014 Stevenson started the Champagne & Sparkling Wine World Championships, which as of 2024 he chairs. Writer Huon Hooke has described the competition as "arguably the world’s most important venue for judging sparkling wine." Wines are reviewed by the same three judges every year for consistency over a period of almost two weeks. Until his death in 2019, these judges were Tony Jordan and Essi Avellan.

Stevenson has repeatedly presented the Christie's Champagne Masterclass in London.

He has written for wine-pages.com, including contributing a "Wine aromas and flavours" resource which was praised by Patrick Comiskey in the LA Times. As of 2024 he writes for The World of Fine Wine magazine.

== Views on wine ==
Stevenson cites The World Atlas of Wine by Hugh Johnson as an early influence on his attitude towards wine.

Stevenson believes the parellada, macabeo and xarel·lo grape varieties are not are suited for the second fermentation used in the traditional method of champagne production.

== Accolades ==
In 1987 Stevenson was elected a confrère oenophile of the Confrérie Saint Etienne, when he was the sole person amongst the Alsace wine producers and other experts present to identify a 50-year-old wine made from the Silvaner grape variety.

He has been nominated for "Wine Writer of the Year" at least three times and has won the Wine Literary Award, America's lifetime achievement award for wine writing.

== Selected publications ==
- Stevenson, Tom (1986). Champagne. Utrecht: HES. ISBN 90-6194-166-0. OCLC 905483538.
- Stevenson, Tom (1993). The Wines of Alsace. ISBN 0-571-14953-7.
- Stevenson, Tom (2003). Christie's World Encyclopedia of Champagne & Sparkling Wine. Christie's International Group (Revised ed.). Bath: Absolute. ISBN 978-1-899791-89-7. OCLC 50434255.
- Stevenson, Tom (2003). 101 Essential Tips: Wine. London: DK Publishers. ISBN 978-0-7894-9685-0. OCLC 55940364.
- Stevenson, Tom (2007). The Sotheby's wine encyclopedia (4th Edition Revised ed.). London: Dorling Kindersley. ISBN 978-1-4053-2656-8. OCLC 338965262.

== See also ==
- Richard Juhlin
- List of wine personalities
