= Traditional method =

Champagne production method

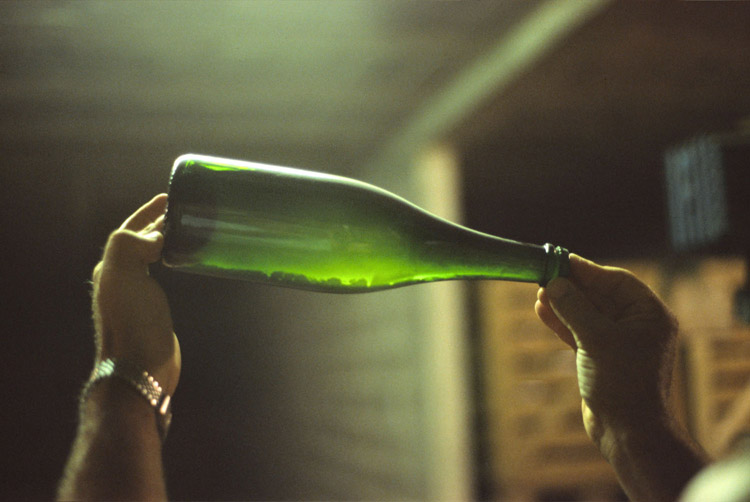
A bottle of undisgorged Champagne resting on the lees. The yeast used in the second fermentation is still in the bottle, which is closed with a crown cap.

The traditional method for producing sparkling wine is the process used in the Champagne region of France to produce Champagne. It is also the method used in various French regions to produce sparkling wines (not called "Champagne"), in Spain to produce cava, in Portugal to produce Espumante and in Italy to produce Franciacorta.

The Champagne producers have successfully lobbied the European Union to restrict the use of the term méthode champenoise within the EU only to wines produced in Champagne. Thus, wines from elsewhere use the term "traditional method" (méthode traditionnelle) or the local language equivalent (método tradicional in Spain and Portugal, metodo classico or metodo tradizionale in Italy, and in Germany klassische Flaschengärung). South African wines from the Western Cape are labelled with the term Methode Cap Classique.

Some wine producers in countries outside the EU may disregard EU labeling laws and use méthode champenoise or even "Champagne" on labels for products not exported to the EU, but this usage is decreasing.

As the traditional method is both labour intensive and costly, it is only viable for high-end sparkling wines. The Charmat process is often used instead in the production of cheaper sparkling wines, while other methods exist as well.

== Harvesting ==
Grapes are generally picked earlier, when sugar levels are lower and acid levels higher. Except for pink or rosé sparkling wines, the juice of harvested grapes is pressed off quickly, to keep the wine white.

== Fermentation ==
The first fermentation begins in the same way as any wine, converting the natural sugar in the grapes into alcohol while the resultant carbon dioxide is allowed to escape. This produces the base wine. This wine is not very pleasant by itself, being too acidic. At this point the blend, known as the cuvée, is assembled, using wines from various vineyards, and, in the case of non-vintage wine, various years. After primary fermentation, blending (assemblage in Champagne) and bottling, a second alcoholic fermentation occurs in the bottle.

Although known as the Champagne method and associated with the name of Dom Pierre Pérignon in the late 17th century, the phenomenon of bottle fermentation was not unique to the Champagne region; it had already been used in Limoux, south western France since 1531 for the production of Blanquette de Limoux. Effervescence in wine was seen as a fault at the time and Perignon devoted much effort trying to eliminate it from the wines of Champagne. The process of secondary fermentation was first described by Christopher Merrett in a paper to the Royal Society, which included his observation that this could be encouraged by adding sugar to the wine before bottling. Concurrent improvements in glass manufacture in England also permitted the making of more robust wine bottles to contain the effervescence without exploding.

== Second fermentation ==
The blended wine is put in bottles along with yeast and a small amount of sugar, called the liqueur de tirage, stopped with a crown cap or another temporary plug, and stored in a wine cellar horizontally for a second fermentation. Under the appellation d'origine contrôlée (AOC), NV (non-vintage) Champagne is required to age for 15 months to develop completely. In years where the harvest is exceptional, a vintage (millesime) is declared and the wine must mature for at least three years.

During the secondary fermentation, the carbon dioxide is trapped in the wine in solution. The amount of added sugar determines the ultimate pressure in the bottle. To reach the standard value of 6 bars (600 kPa) inside the bottle, it is necessary to have 18 grams of sugar; the amount of yeast (Saccharomyces cerevisiae) is regulated by the European Commission (Regulation 1622/2000, 24 July 2000) to be 0.3 gram per bottle. The liqueur de tirage is then a mixture of sugar, yeast and still Champagne wine.

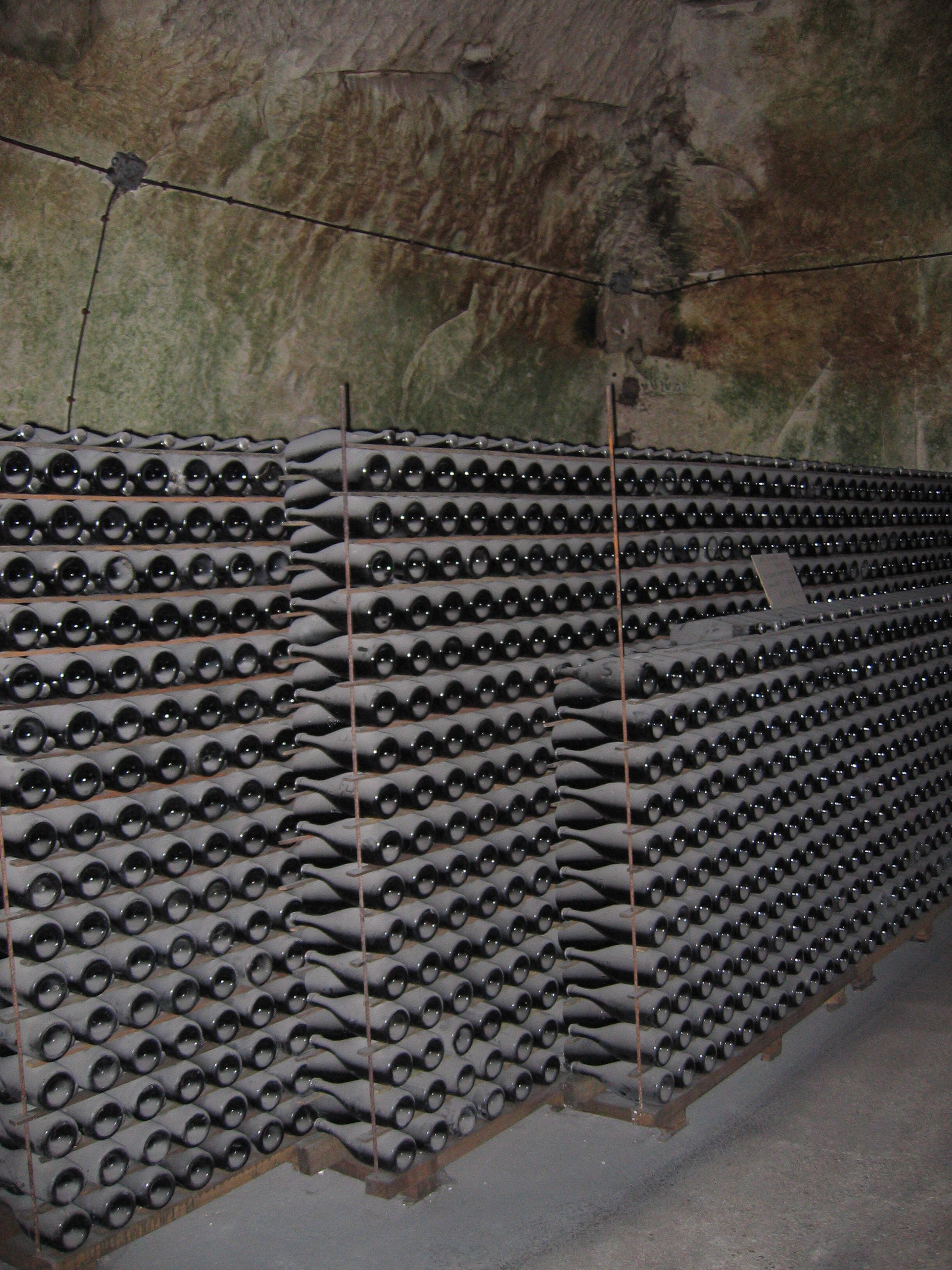
Bottles of Champagne aging in the cellars of Veuve Clicquot

== Ageing on lees ==
Non-vintage Champagne wine is legally unsellable until 15 months' in-bottle aging on lees. Champagne's AOC also requires vintage Champagnes age 3 years before disgorgement, but most top producers hold bottles on lees for 6–8 years.

== Riddling ==
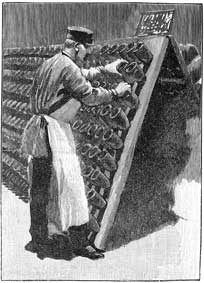
Le Remueur: 1889 engraving of a man engaged in the laborious daily task of turning each bottle a fraction

After ageing, the lees must be consolidated for removal. The bottles undergo a process known as riddling (remuage in French). In this stage, the bottles are placed on special racks called pupitres that hold them at a 35° angle, with the crown cap pointed down. Once a day (every two days for Champagne), the bottles are given a slight shake and turn, alternatively on right then left, and dropped back into the pupitres, with the angle gradually increased. The drop back into the rack causes a slight tap, pushing sediments toward the neck of the bottle. In 10 to 14 days (8 to 10 weeks for Champagne), the position of the bottle is straight down, with the lees settled in the neck (this time can be shortened by moving the bottle more than once a day, and by using modern, less sticky strains of yeast). Manual riddling is still done for some Prestige Cuvées in Champagne, but has otherwise been largely abandoned because of the high labour costs. Mechanised riddling equipment (a gyropalette) is used instead.

Many stores sell riddling racks for decorative storage of finished wine.

== Disgorging ==
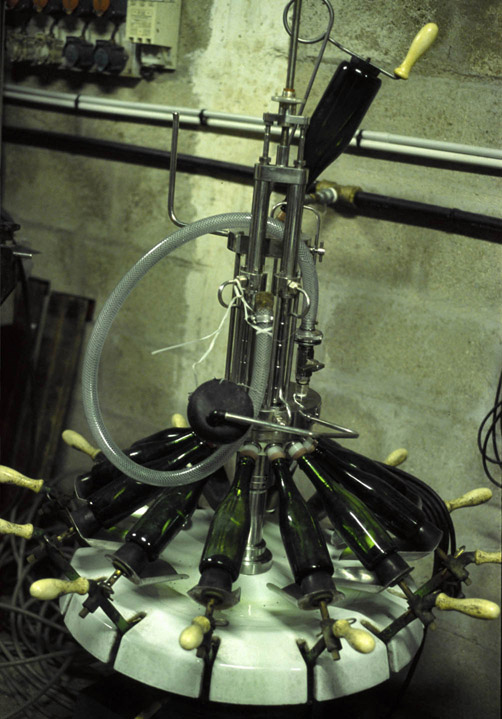
Equipment for effecting dosage through the addition of 'liqueur d'expédition

The lees removal process is called disgorging (dégorgement in French), traditionally a skilled manual process where the crown cap and lees are removed without losing much of the liquid, and a varying amount of sugar added. Before the invention of this process by Madame Clicquot in 1816, Champagne was cloudy. Modern automated disgorgement is done by freezing a small amount of the liquid in the neck and removing this plug of ice containing the lees.

== Dosage ==
Immediately after disgorging but before final corking, the liquid level is topped up with liqueur d'expédition, commonly a little sugar, a practice known as dosage. The liqueur d'expédition is a mixture of the base wine and sucrose, plus 0.02 to 0.03 grams of sulfur dioxide as a preservative. Some maisons de Champagne (Champagne brands) claim to have secret recipes for this, adding ingredients such as old Champagne wine and candi sugar. In the Traité théorique et pratique du travail des vins (1873), Maumené lists the additional ingredients "usually present in the liqueur d'expédition": port wine, cognac, elderberry wine, kirsch, framboise wine, alum solutions, tartaric acid, and tannins.

The amount of sugar in the liqueur d'expédition determines the sweetness of the Champagne, the sugar previously in the wine having been consumed in the second fermentation. Generally, sugar is added to balance the high acidity of the Champagne, rather than to produce a sweet taste. Brut Champagne will only have a little sugar added, and Champagne called nature or zéro dosage will have no sugar added at all. A cork is then inserted, with a capsule and wire cage (muselet) securing it in place.

Champagne's sugar content varies. The sweetest level is 'doux' (meaning sweet) and then, in increasing dryness, 'demi-sec' (half-dry), 'sec' (dry), 'extra sec' (extra dry), 'brut' (raw), 'extra brut' (very raw), 'brut nature/brut zero/ultra brut' (no additional sugar).

== Vintage vs. non-vintage ==
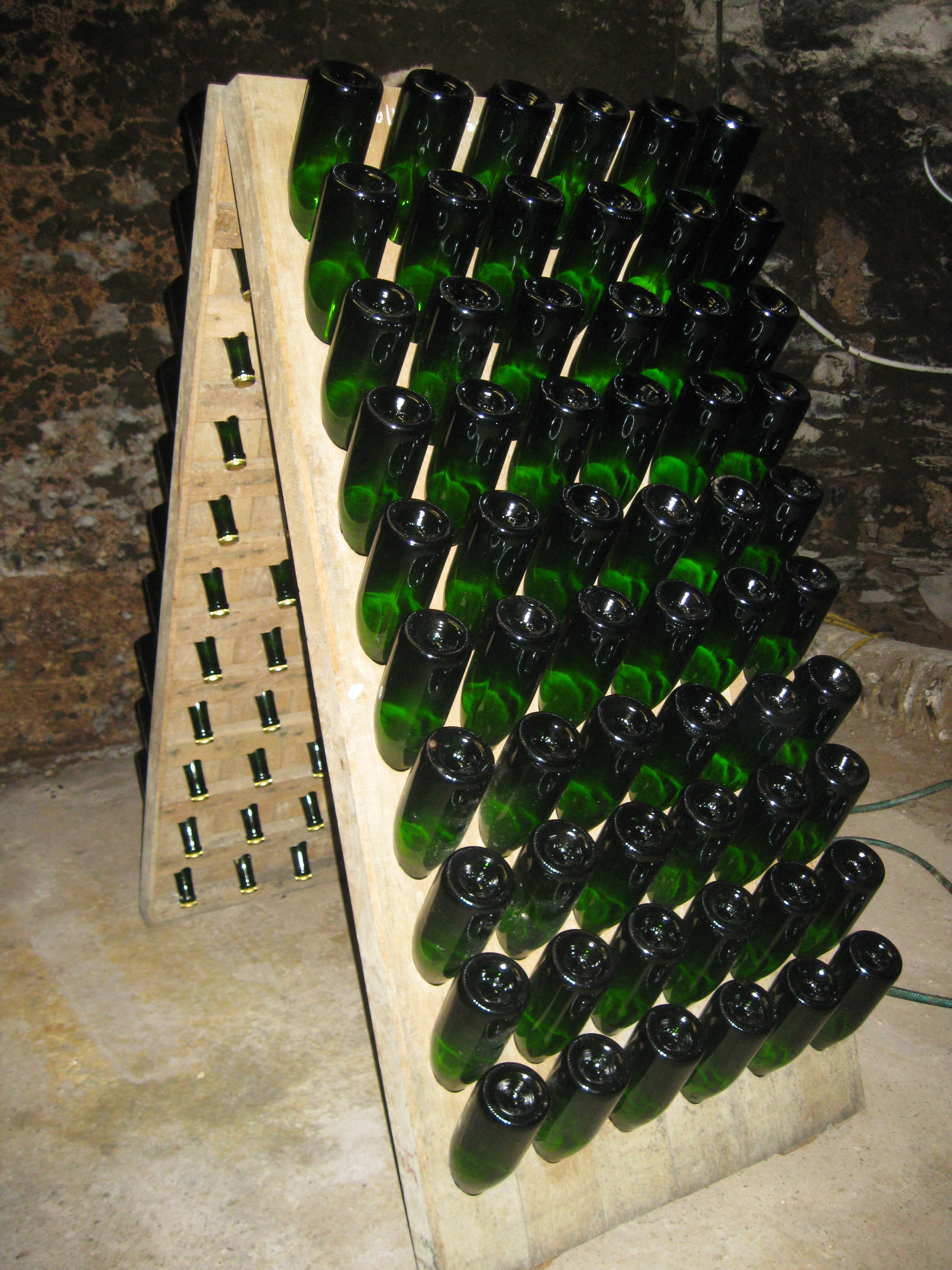
Genuine classical Champagne riddle rack, 60 bottles each side

The majority of the Champagne produced is non-vintage (also known as mixed vintage or multivintage), a blend of wines from several years. This means that no declared year will be displayed on the bottle label. Typically, however, the majority of the wine is from the current year but a percentage is made of reserve wine from previous years. This serves to smooth out some of the vintage variations caused by the marginal growing climate of Champagne, which is the most northerly winegrowing region in France. Most Champagne houses strive for a consistent house style from year to year (largely for reasons related to price-setting and successful marketing), and this is arguably one of the hardest tasks of the house winemaker.

The grapes to produce vintage Champagne must be 100% from the year indicated (some other wines in the EU need only be 85% to be called vintage, depending on their type and appellation). Vintage Champagnes are the product of a single high-quality year, and bottles from prestigious makers can be rare and expensive. To help maintain the quality of vintage Champagnes, a maximum of only half the year's total harvest may be used in the production of a specific vintage. This helps to ensure that the best grapes available are selected for this purpose, leaving the remainder of the harvest for use in non-vintage releases.

== Bottle ageing ==
Even experts disagree about the effects of ageing on Champagne after disgorgement. Some prefer the freshness and vitality of young, recently disgorged Champagne, and others prefer the baked apple and caramel flavours that develop from a year or more of bottle ageing. In 2009, a 184-year-old bottle of Perrier-Jouët was opened and tasted, still drinkable, with notes of "truffles and caramel", according to the experts.

== See also ==
- List of Champagne houses
