= Disgorging =

Removal of sediment from bottled sparkling wine

A bottling line for sparkling wine, including mechanical disgorging

Disgorging, also called disgorgement (French: dégorgement), is the removal of sediment from a bottle of sparkling wine made by the traditional method. The sediment, known as lees, forms during the wine's second fermentation and subsequent maturation in the bottle. Before disgorging, riddling brings the sediment into the neck; opening the bottle then allows its internal pressure to expel the deposit.

Disgorging can be performed by hand without freezing the sediment, a method called à la volée, or after freezing the sediment into a plug, called à la glace. It is followed by topping up the bottle, adding a dosage where required, and fitting the final cork.

== History ==
In the early nineteenth century, the development of riddling equipment at Veuve Clicquot, associated with Madame Clicquot and her cellar master Antoine de Müller, improved the collection of sediment in the bottle neck before its removal. Disgorging itself was a manual operation: the worker held the bottle with its neck downwards, removed the cork to release the sediment, and quickly raised the bottle to limit the loss of wine.

The freezing method was developed by Armand Walfard, who patented it in 1884. Henri Abelé was the first Champagne house to adopt it; Moët & Chandon and Perrier-Jouët followed in 1891. Freezing held the sediment together while the bottle was turned upright, making its removal easier and reducing wine losses. Disgorging without freezing continued among producers unable to afford the equipment.

== Methods ==
=== Without freezing ===
In disgorging à la volée, the operator removes the temporary crown cap, or cork and retaining clip, as the bottle is brought upright. The pressure expels the sediment with some wine. The timing and angle require skill: raising the bottle too early can disperse the sediment, while raising it too little allows excessive wine loss. The operator checks the wine's clarity and smell before it passes to the dosage stage. Large bottles and certain special cuvées are still disgorged by hand.

=== With freezing ===
For disgorging à la glace, the inverted bottle's neck is immersed in a refrigerated bath, typically at about −27 °C (−17 °F). A plug of ice forms around the sediment. After a few minutes, the bottle is turned upright and its temporary closure is removed. The pressure inside the bottle ejects the frozen plug together with the trapped lees. Freezing allows the bottle to be raised without mixing the sediment back into the wine.

=== Equipment ===
Mechanised production lines combine neck freezing and bottle turning with equipment for removing the temporary closures. Subsequent machines add the dosage, adjust the fill level, insert the final cork and secure its wire cage. The bottles are then turned to mix the dosage with the wine and returned to pallets before labelling and other finishing operations.

== Dosage and corking ==
After disgorging, the lost volume is replaced with wine. The producer may also add liqueur d'expédition, a mixture of wine and sugar, in a process called dosage. The quantity of sugar added helps determine the finished wine's sweetness; wines made without added sugar may be labelled brut nature. The bottle is then closed with its final cork, secured by a wire cage called a muselet.

== Disgorgement date and ageing ==
Disgorging ends the wine's maturation on its lees and exposes it to air. Its timing therefore affects the wine's subsequent development. Prolonged ageing on the lees can preserve freshness while developing aromatic complexity; after disgorging, exposure to oxygen contributes to changes in aroma, including the development of dried-fruit, nutty and other oxidative characteristics.

Some producers print the disgorgement date on the label. This records when the sediment was removed and allows the time elapsed since disgorging to be distinguished from the wine's earlier maturation on the lees. Late-disgorged wines remain on their lees for an extended period before being prepared for release. Bollinger introduced its R.D. (Récemment Dégorgé, or "recently disgorged") Champagne in 1967, including a wine from the 1952 vintage, and displayed the disgorgement date on its label.

== Alternative approaches ==
Immobilised yeast has been investigated as a way to simplify the clarification of sparkling wine and the removal of yeast after fermentation. Approaches include enclosing Saccharomyces cerevisiae in calcium alginate beads and retaining yeast behind a membrane in a cartridge used for the second fermentation. Such systems keep the cells together or confined while allowing fermentation to proceed. Their practical limitations include cost, the release of cells or material into the wine, and membrane fouling.

== Use in brewing ==
Disgorging is also used for some beers produced with techniques borrowed from sparkling winemaking. The Belgian beer DeuS, for example, undergoes bottle refermentation and maturation, followed by riddling and the removal of the yeast in a frozen plug expelled by the pressure inside the bottle.
