= Gyropalette =

Equipment to produce sparkling wine

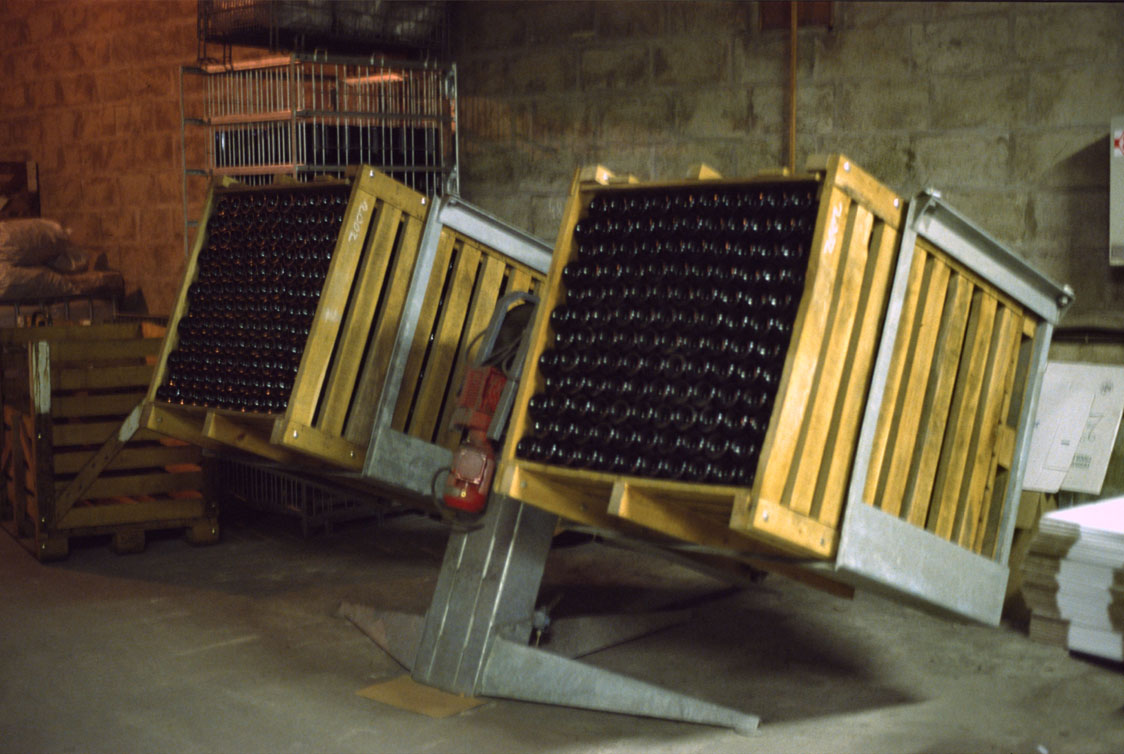
Riddling machines in a wine cellar

A Gyropalette, also known as a riddling machine, is a piece of equipment used in the production of sparkling wine, such as champagne, made by the traditional method, where the second fermentation takes place in the bottle.

== Background ==
In order to remove the yeast sediment ("lees") left in the bottle after the fermentation, riddling (or in French remuage) is performed. At certain intervals, the bottle is twisted, shaken slightly and moved progressively to a vertical position with the neck pointing down. Traditionally, this used to take place manually over the course of several weeks, with wine cellar workers called remueurs performing the task on each individual bottle, on wooden racks.

A Gyropalette performs the same task automatically on many bottles at the same time, and in a shorter period of time. The bottles are placed in a cage, and are moved in a way which emulates the action of a remueur by means of motors and automatic controls.

The Gyropalette was invented by two French vintners, Claude Cazals and Jacques Ducoin, who filed for patent in 1968. It was first introduced in Spain in the mid-1970s with Cava-producer Codorníu as the first big user. Most sparkling wines produced by the traditional method, including most champagnes, are now produced using Gyropalette. The manual method is still used for some high-end wines.

The name Gyropalette is a registered trade mark of Oeno Concept, a company based in the Champagne region of France.

== See also ==
- Sparkling wine production
