= Richard Juhlin =

Swedish writer

Richard Juhlin (born 1962) is a Swedish writer on Champagne and is a freelance journalist.

== Education ==
Juhlin is a physical education teacher by training, and was educated at the Swedish School of Sport and Health Sciences in Stockholm. He worked as a teacher in Mälarhöjden before he could make Champagne-related activities his full-time profession in 1986.

== Selected books ==
- Allt du skulle vilja veta om champagne & lite till ... (2023)
- Magnum Opus ENG, 2022
- Magnum Opus SWE, 2021
- Champagne Hiking, 2017
- A Scent of Champagne, 2013
- The Champagne Guide, 2008
- 4000 Champagnes, 2004
- 3000 Champagner, 2002
- The Great Tasting, 2000
- 2000 Champagnes, 1999
- Champagneboken, 1995

== See also ==
- Tom Stevenson, another prominent Champagne writer.
