= Essi Avellan =

Finnish wine writer

Essi Avellan (born 1975) is a sparkling wine expert, wine writer and wine competition judge. In 2006, she became the first Finn to be awarded the qualification Master of Wine.

Evallan became interested in wine while studying for a Master of Science degree in Business Administration, when she worked at a Finnish owned château in Bordeaux. She was the editor of FINE Champagne magazine between 2007 and 2019, releasing the first edition in March 2007. Since 2013, she has updated the Christie's World Encyclopedia of Champagne & Sparkling Wine with Tom Stevenson. In his review of the 2019 edition, author Jamie Goode described Avellan's palate as "acclaimed," having a preference for purity and wine produced in an anaerobic environment. He notes she penalises wines with signs of oxidisation or "quirks." Stevenson has described her as "the most naturally gifted Champagne taster I have seen."

As of 2015 she had taught a popular wine tasting course in Tampere for eight years. Avellan has worked as a judge in the Decanter World Wine Awards, and since 2014 has been one of three judges in the Champagne & Sparkling Wine World Championships.

== Accolades ==
- 2011: Alumnus of the year for the Turku School of Economics
- 2018: Knight rank in Order of Agricultural Merit

== See also ==
- List of wine professionals
- Tony Jordan (winemaker) - Another judge at the Champagne & Sparkling Wine World Championships
