= The Wines of Alsace =

1993 book by Tom Stevenson

- Author: Tom Stevenson
- Language: English
- Genre: Non-fiction
- Publisher: Faber & Faber
- Publication date: 1993
- ISBN: 0-571-14953-7

The Wines of Alsace by Tom Stevenson was published in 1993 by Faber & Faber. This 600 page book profiles 300 producers, 118 wine villages, 51 grands crus, 84 lieux-dits, 28 clos and 4 wine-producing châteaux of Alsace. The vintage chart stretches from 1992 back to 585.

In “Alsace, French or German?”, Stevenson traces the historical development of Alsace back to the Protocelts who settled this part of the Rhine 3,500 years ago, and determines that not only was Alsace originally German, but it was the French who were the first to invade the region. He also researched the popular notion that the reputation of Alsace wine was deliberately lost by the Germans after the Franco-Prussian War, and discovered that prior to that war the French had expanded the region’s vineyards into unsuitable areas on the plains, and planted them with lowly varieties, “proof positive” according to Stevenson that “it was Gallic madness, not German vindictiveness”.

Although published in 1993, Stevenson’s portraits of the growers are still considered valid today, due to his ability to capture the essence of the people and their wines.

ISBN 0-571-14953-7
