= The Sotheby's Wine Encyclopedia =

1988–2007 reference work by Tom Stevenson

- Fourth edition cover
- Author: Tom Stevenson
- Language: English
- Genre: Wine compendium
- Publisher: Dorling Kindersley
- Publication date: November 2007 (fourth edition)
- Publication place: United Kingdom
- Media type: Print (hardcover)
- Pages: 664
- ISBN: 978-1-4053-2656-8
- OCLC: 338965262

The Sotheby's Wine Encyclopedia is a reference work on wine written by Tom Stevenson and published since 1988 by Dorling Kindersley, selling over 600,000 copies in 14 languages.

The Sotheby's Wine Encyclopedia has a stated aim to map and describe "every appellation, official and unofficial", of which there were more than 4,000 in total by 1997, making it an industry standard wine reference and required reading for the Master of Wine, Master Sommelier and Cape Wine Master examinations. The contents include hard data, technical information, tables and ancillary explanations are compartmentalized from the flow of mainstream text, with profiles of nearly 2,000 wineries, and recommendation of more than 6,000 producers.

Frequently compared to The Oxford Companion to Wine, The Sotheby's Wine Encyclopedia along with The World Atlas of Wine, is often cited to be among the most notable books on wine today. Tim Atkin MW, wine correspondent for The Observer considers it to be one of the two most essential wine reference books in English. Weighed in by San Francisco Chronicle at 5 pounds, 11 ounces, its review states, "What makes it enjoyable to browse is Stevenson's openness as well as the almost hidden inclusion of short, provocative essays".

== Editions ==
First published in 1988 as Sotheby's World Wine Encyclopedia, there have been alterations with the succeeding editions. The largest revision took place in 1997 when the book increased in size from 480 to 600 pages. In 1995 the title was altered to The New Sotheby's Wine Encyclopedia, while the current title has been in use since the 2005 revision, which also contained a vast number of upgradings to winery ratings, and for the first time incorporated symbols to identify wineries that are organic or biodynamic.

== Criticism ==
While it is the opinion of some that The Sotheby's Wine Encyclopedia is "as academically comprehensive as ever", South African wine writer Neil Pendock of The Times expressed criticism over the omissions, inaccuracies and outdated material concerning wine from the region of South Africa in the 2007 edition. Among the statements in contention is Stevenson's quote, "The development of [Pinotage] was supposed to provide Burgundy-like elegance in the baking vineyards of North Africa". In his 2008 book Sour Grapes, Pendock described The Sotheby's Wine Encyclopedia as "spectacularly error-prone".
