= Clairette de Die AOC =

French wine

- Wine region
- Official name: Clairette de Die AOC
- Type: Appelation d'origine contrôlée
- Year established: Clairette 1942; Crèmant 1993
- Years of wine industry: over 2,000
- Country: France
- Part of: Rhône Valley
- Other regions in Rhône Valley: Crémant de Die
- Climate region: Mediterranean
- Size of planted vineyards: 1,500
- No. of vineyards: 300
- Grapes produced: Muscat blanc, Clairette
- Wine produced: natural sparkling
- Comments: 2005

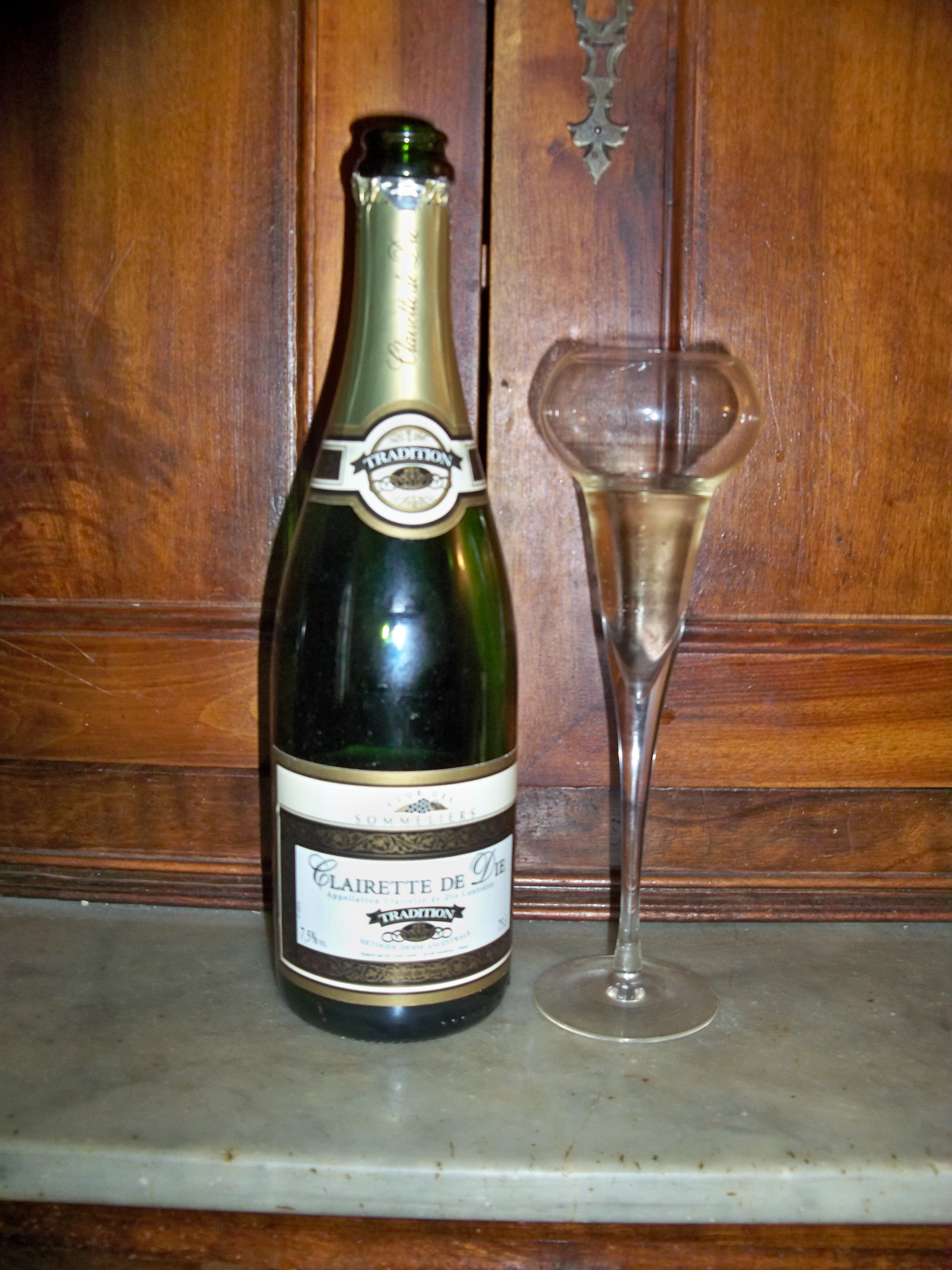
Clairette de Die

Clairette de Die (French pronunciation: [klɛʁɛt də di]) AOC is a natural sparkling white wine from the Rhône Valley region in France. It is made from the Muscat Blanc à Petits Grains (75% minimum) and Clairette (25% maximum) grape varieties. It is characterized by its peach and apricot flavours and rose and honeysuckle aromas, and is usually drunk young at a maximum of two years, and served chilled at a temperature of 6°C to 8°C.

Crémant de Die from the same area and same producers is a prestige dry, natural sparkling wine of apple and green fruit flavours and fragrance and is vinified by the traditional method of a first fermentation in the vat followed by a second fermentation in the bottle. Originally produced from 100% Clairette, Aligoté and Muscat are now included. It is usually drunk as an aperitif but it can equally accompany a meal. At 7% or 8 % ABV, it contains less alcohol than most sparkling wines.

== Location, soil and history ==
East of the town of Valence, the vineyards of Die in the French department of the Drôme on the border area between the northern and southern sub-regions of the Côtes du Rhône AOC area, in the Rhône wine region, at altitudes of up to 700 metres are among the highest in France. The chalky argilliferous soil has the feature of being able to retain enough of its rainwater to maintain a constant supply to the vines during the long dry summers.

Although the Die region stands isolated in an area of otherwise very little wine production between the northern and southern wine producing parts of the Rhône valley, the making of Clairette de Die can be traced back over two thousand years. In 1971, the method of production of Clairette de Die wine was officially recognised as the "ancestral Dioise process" in 1971. Clairette received its first distinction, the AO (appellation d'origine) in 1910, and the AOC was established in 1942.

== Local lore ==
According to one vineyard that operates a private museum in Le Diois France, the process was found accidentally by a Gallic shepherd. The shepherd was using the cool waters of La Drôme river to chill a bottle of local wine. The bottle was forgotten and left in the cold water over the Winter. Upon finding it in the Spring, the wine was found to be carbonated or in French pétillant, a word that roughly means "effervescent" or "sparkling". Subsequent to the original discovery, Gallic tribes left jars of the wine in rivers over the winter and then recovered them in the spring. The first documented description of the wine came from Roman author Pliny the Elder.

== Other wines from the Die region ==
Coteaux de Die - A still (non sparkling) dry white wine produced from 100% clairette that was accorded an AOC in 1993. The low annual production is about 144 hectolitres. Characterised by green tints, it is usually drunk chilled and can accompany seafood.

Châtillon-en-Diois - A still (non sparkling) wine available in three colours that was accorded an AOC in 1975. The red and rosé are produced from gamay, pinot noir and syrah and are produced only from the vineyards around the village of the same name while the white wine is produced by thirteen communes.

== See also ==
- Rhône wine
- French wine
