= Fermentation in winemaking =

Wine making process

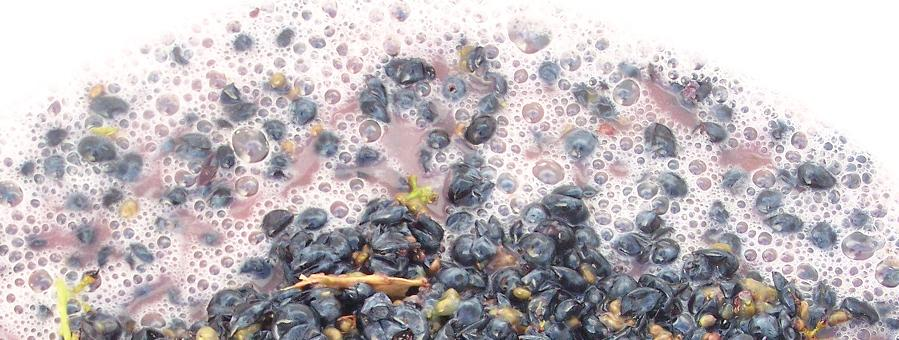
Fermenting must

The process of fermentation in winemaking turns grape juice into an alcoholic beverage. During fermentation, yeasts transform sugars present in the juice into ethanol and carbon dioxide (as a by-product). In winemaking, the temperature and speed of fermentation are important considerations as well as the levels of oxygen present in the must at the start of the fermentation. The risk of stuck fermentation and the development of several wine faults can also occur during this stage, which can last anywhere from 5 to 14 days for primary fermentation and potentially another 5 to 10 days for a secondary fermentation. Fermentation may be done in stainless steel tanks, which is common with many white wines like Riesling, in an open wooden vat, inside a wine barrel and inside the wine bottle itself as in the production of many sparkling wines.

== History ==
The natural occurrence of fermentation means it was probably first observed long ago by humans. The earliest uses of the word "fermentation" in relation to winemaking was in reference to the apparent "boiling" within the must that came from the anaerobic reaction of the yeast to the sugars in the grape juice and the release of carbon dioxide. The Latin fervere means, literally, to boil. In the mid-19th century, Louis Pasteur noted the connection between yeast and the process of the fermentation in which the yeast act as catalyst and mediator through a series of a reaction that convert sugar into alcohol. The discovery of the Embden–Meyerhof–Parnas pathway by Gustav Embden, Otto Fritz Meyerhof and Jakub Karol Parnas in the early 20th century contributed more to the understanding of the complex chemical processes involved in the conversion of sugar to alcohol.

== Process ==
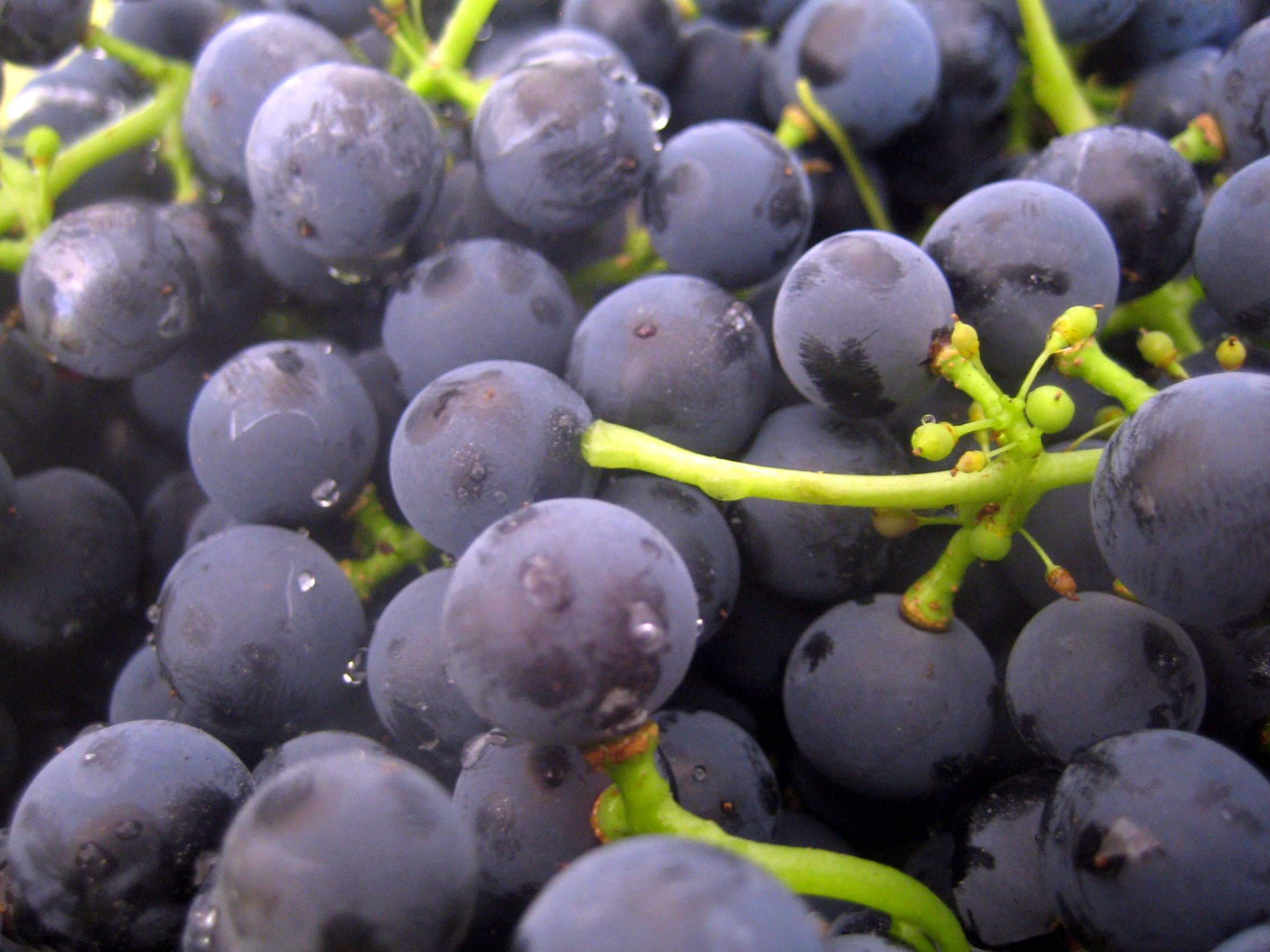
"Bloom", visible as a dusting on the berries

In winemaking, there are distinctions made between ambient yeasts which are naturally present in wine cellars, vineyards and on the grapes themselves (sometimes known as a grape's "bloom" or "blush") and cultured yeast which are specifically isolated and inoculated for use in winemaking. The most common genera of wild yeasts found in winemaking include Candida, Klöckera/Hanseniaspora, Metschnikowiaceae, Pichia and Zygosaccharomyces. Wild yeasts can produce high-quality, unique-flavored wines; however, they are often unpredictable and may introduce less desirable traits to the wine, and can even contribute to spoilage. Few yeast, and lactic and acetic acid bacterial colonies naturally live on the surface of grapes, but traditional wine makers, particularly in Europe, advocate use of ambient yeast as a characteristic of the region's terroir; nevertheless, many winemakers prefer to control fermentation with predictable cultured yeast. The cultured yeasts most commonly used in winemaking belong to the Saccharomyces cerevisiae (also known as "sugar yeast") species. Within this species are several hundred different strains of yeast that can be used during fermentation to affect the heat or vigor of the process and enhance or suppress certain flavor characteristics of the varietal. The use of different strains of yeasts is a major contributor to the diversity of wine, even among the same grape variety. Alternative, non-Saccharomyces cerevisiae, yeasts are being used more prevalently in the industry to add greater complexity to wine. After a winery has been in operation for a number of years, few yeast strains are actively involved in the fermentation process. The use of active dry yeasts reduces the variety of strains that appear in spontaneous fermentation by outcompeting those strains that are naturally present.

The addition of cultured yeast normally occurs with the yeast first in a dried or "inactive" state and is reactivated in warm water or diluted grape juice prior to being added to the must. To thrive and be active in fermentation, the yeast needs access to a continuous supply of carbon, nitrogen, sulfur, phosphorus as well as access to various vitamins and minerals. These components are naturally present in the grape must but their amount may be corrected by adding nutrients to the wine, in order to foster a more encouraging environment for the yeast. Newly formulated time-release nutrients, specifically manufactured for wine fermentations, offer the most advantageous conditions for yeast. Oxygen is needed as well, but in wine making, the risk of oxidation and the lack of alcohol production from oxygenated yeast requires the exposure of oxygen to be kept at a minimum.

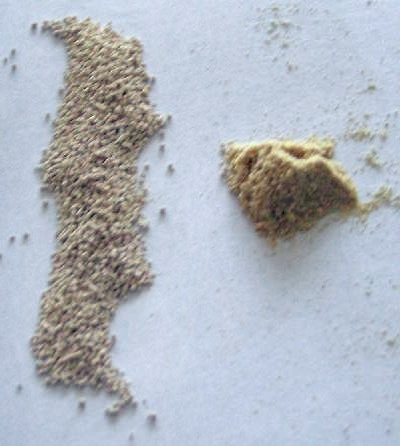
Dry winemaking yeast (left) and yeast nutrients used in the rehydration process to stimulate yeast cells.

Upon the introduction of active yeasts to the grape must, phosphates are attached to the sugar and the six-carbon sugar molecules begin to be split into three-carbon pieces and go through a series of rearrangement reactions. During this process, the carboxylic carbon atom is released in the form of carbon dioxide with the remaining components becoming acetaldehyde. The absence of oxygen in this anaerobic process allows the acetaldehyde to be eventually converted, by reduction, to ethanol. During the conversion of acetaldehyde, a small amount is converted, by oxidation, to acetic acid which, in excess, can contribute to the wine fault known as volatile acidity (vinegar taint). After the yeast has exhausted its life cycle, they fall to the bottom of the fermentation tank as sediment known as lees. Yeast ceases its activity whenever all of the sugar in must has been converted into other chemicals or whenever the alcohol content has reached 15% alcohol per unit volume; a concentration strong enough to halt the enzymatic activity of almost all strains of yeast.

=== Other compounds involved ===
The metabolism of amino acids and breakdown of sugars by yeasts has the effect of creating other biochemical compounds that can contribute to the flavor and aroma of wine. These compounds can be considered "volatile" like aldehydes, ethyl acetate, ester, fatty acids, fusel oils, hydrogen sulfide, ketones and mercaptans or "non-volatile" like glycerol, acetic acid and succinic acid. Yeast also has the effect during fermentation of releasing glycoside hydrolase which can hydrolyse the flavor precursors of aliphatics (a flavor component that reacts with oak), benzene derivatives, monoterpenes (responsible for floral aromas from grapes like Muscat and Traminer), norisoprenoids (responsible for some of the spice notes in Chardonnay), and phenols.

Some strains of yeasts can generate volatile thiols which contribute to the fruity aromas in many wines such as the gooseberry scent commonly associated with Sauvignon blanc.
Brettanomyces yeasts are responsible for the "barnyard aroma" characteristic in some red wines like Burgundy and Pinot noir.

Methanol is not a major constituent of wine. The usual concentration range is between 0.1 g/liter and 0.2 g/liter. These small traces have no adverse effect on people and no direct effect on the senses.

== Winemaking considerations ==
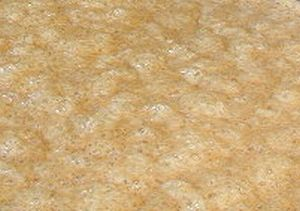
Carbon dioxide activity is visible during the fermentation process in the form of bubbles in the must.

During fermentation, there are several factors that winemakers take into consideration, with the most influential to ethanol production being sugar content in the must, the yeast strain used, and the fermentation temperature. The biochemical process of fermentation itself creates a lot of residual heat which can take the must out of the ideal temperature range for the wine. Typically, white wine is fermented between 18–20 °C (64–68 °F) though a wine maker may choose to use a higher temperature to bring out some of the complexity of the wine. Red wine is typically fermented at higher temperatures 20–30 °C (68–86 °F). Fermentation at higher temperatures may have adverse effect on the wine in stunning the yeast to inactivity and even "boiling off" some of the flavors of the wines. Some winemakers may ferment their red wines at cooler temperatures, more typical of white wines, in order to bring out more fruit flavors.

To control the heat generated during fermentation, the winemaker must choose a suitable vessel size or else use a cooling device. Various kinds of cooling devices are available, ranging from the ancient Bordeaux practice of placing the fermentation vat atop blocks of ice to sophisticated fermentation tanks that have built-in cooling rings.

A risk factor involved with fermentation is the development of chemical residue and spoilage which can be corrected with the addition of sulfur dioxide (SO_{2}), although excess SO_{2} can lead to a wine fault. A winemaker who wishes to make a wine with high levels of residual sugar (like a dessert wine) may stop fermentation early either by dropping the temperature of the must to stun the yeast or by adding a high level of alcohol (like brandy) to the must to kill off the yeast and create a fortified wine.

The ethanol produced through fermentation acts as an important co-solvent for the non-polar compounds that water cannot dissolve, such as pigments from grape skins, giving wine varieties their distinct color, and other aromatics. Ethanol and the acidity of wine act as an inhibitor to bacterial growth, allowing wine to be safely kept for years in the absence of air.

== Other types of fermentation ==
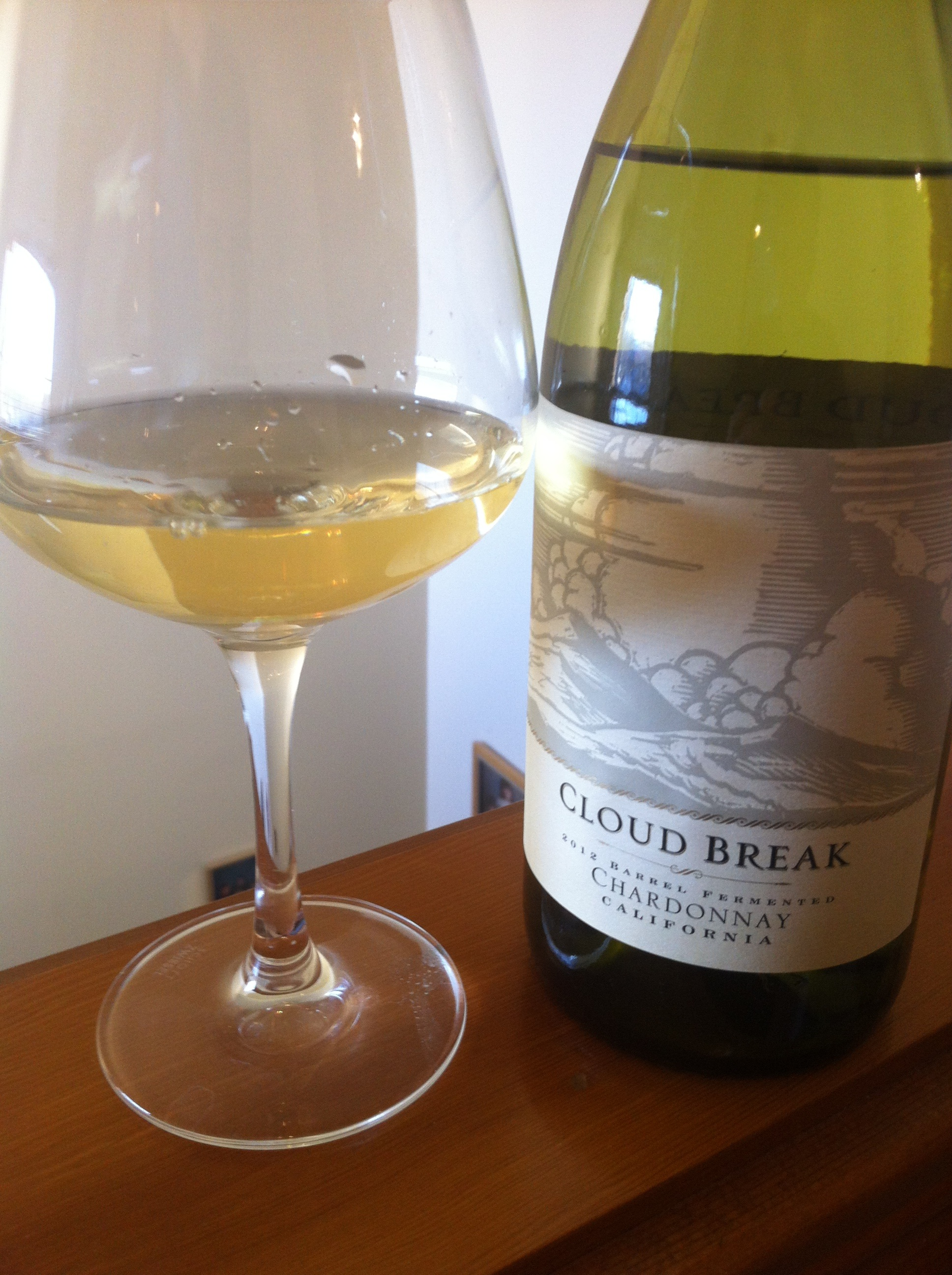
A California Chardonnay that shows it has been barrel fermented.

In winemaking, there are different processes that fall under the title of "Fermentation" but might not follow the same procedure commonly associated with wine fermentation.

=== Bottle fermentation ===
Bottle fermentation is a method of sparkling wine production, originating in the Champagne region where after the cuvee has gone through a primary yeast fermentation the wine is then bottled and goes through a secondary fermentation where sugar and additional yeast known as liqueur de tirage is added to the wine. This secondary fermentation is what creates the carbon dioxide bubbles that sparkling wine is known for.

=== Carbonic maceration ===
The process of carbonic maceration is also known as whole grape fermentation where instead of yeast being added, the grapes fermentation is encouraged to take place inside the individual grape berries. This method is common in the creation of Beaujolais wine and involves whole clusters of grapes being stored in a closed container with the oxygen in the container being replaced with carbon dioxide. Unlike normal fermentation where yeast converts sugar into alcohol, carbonic maceration works by enzymes within the grape breaking down the cellular matter to form ethanol and other chemical properties. The resulting wines are typically soft and fruity.

=== Malolactic fermentation ===
Instead of yeast, bacteria play a fundamental role in malolactic fermentation which is essentially the conversion of malic acid into lactic acid. This has the benefit of reducing some of the tartness and making the resulting wine taste softer. Depending on the style of wine that the winemaker is trying to produce, malolactic fermentation may take place at the very same time as the yeast fermentation. Alternatively, some strains of yeast may be developed that can convert L-malate to L-lactate during alcohol fermentation. For example, Saccharomyces cerevisiae strain ML01 (S. cerevisiae strain ML01), which carries a gene encoding malolactic enzyme from Oenococcus oeni and a gene encoding malate permease from Schizosaccharomyces pombe. S. cerevisiae strain ML01 has received regulatory approval in both Canada and the United States.

== See also ==
- Co-fermentation
