= Christopher Merret =

English physician and scientist (1614/1615–1695)

Christopher Merret FRS FRCP
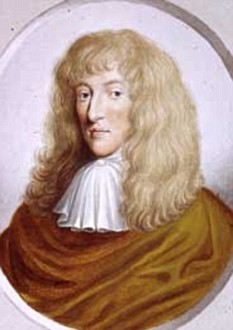
- Born: 16 February 1614/5; Winchcombe, Gloucestershire, England
- Died: 19 August 1695 (aged 80 or 81); Hatton Garden, London, England
- Resting place: St Andrew Holborn
- Education: Gloucester Hall, Oxford (BMed, DMed); Oriel College, Oxford (BA)
- Known for: First description of sparkling wine First list of British birds
- Scientific career
- Fields: Natural history; glassmaking

Christopher Merret FRS FRCP (16 February 1614/1615 – 19 August 1695), also spelt Merrett, was an English physician and scientist. He was the first to document the deliberate addition of sugar for the production of sparkling wine, and produced the first lists of British birds and butterflies.

== Early life and education ==
Merret was born in Winchcombe, Gloucestershire on 16 February; Hunter gives the year of his birth as 1615, which may be 1614 Old Style. In 1632 he went up to Gloucester Hall, Oxford (which later became Worcester College); he received his BA from Oriel in 1635, and his BMed and DMed from Gloucester Hall in 1636 and 1643 respectively.

== Career ==
=== Medicine ===
Merret then practised medicine in London, becoming a Fellow of the Royal College of Physicians in 1651. Three years later he moved to the RCP's premises at Amen Corner near St Paul's Cathedral, as the first Harveian Librarian, for which he received room and board and a small stipend. But disaster struck in 1666 with the Great Fire of London, which destroyed many of the rooms and most of the books. The college felt that he was no longer needed, but he felt that he had been appointed for life and fought them before the King's Bench twice, losing both times. He was expelled from his rooms and lost his Fellowship. He was a founding Fellow of the Royal Society, joining May 20, 1663. He became the chairman of the Royal Society's committee concerned with the history of trade and commerce, but was expelled in 1685.

=== Naturalist ===
Merret collected new plants, maintained a herb garden and compiled one of the first lists of the flora, fauna and minerals of England, the Pinax Rerum Naturalium Britannicarum. The Pinax was published in 1666 and is an alphabetical catalogue with no explanatory commentary. However it represents the first lists of British birds and butterflies, and contains one of the first statements by an Englishman on the organic origin of fossils:

…it is abundantly clear to me that many stones considered to be inorganic are fashioned out of animals or their parts through the action of some earthen fluid; that they had communicated their shape to the clay or soft earth, and had then perished though their figure was preserved

=== Metallurgy and glass making ===
Merret had a particular interest in industrial uses of minerals, publishing papers on smelting and tin mining. In 1662 he translated Antonio Neri’s The Art of Glass (1611) and added 147 pages of his own, from other authors and his own observations. His descriptions of glassmaking indicate an intimate familiarity with the process, but his modern claim to fame lies in a passing mention to a different field altogether. On 17 December 1662 he presented Some Observations concerning the Ordering of Wines to the Royal Society. In this paper, unearthed by wine writer Tom Stevenson, Merret describes winemakers adding quantities of sugar and molasses to make the wines drink brisk and sparkling. Today this would be called the méthode champenoise, the addition of liqueur de tirage in order to stimulate a secondary fermentation that produces the bubbles in sparkling wine.

Spontaneous secondary fermentation had occurred in still wines since antiquity; most glass bottles of the time were not strong enough to contain the high pressures thus generated and so exploding bottles were an occupational hazard of winemaking. Sir Robert Mansell obtained a monopoly on glass production in England in the early 17th century and industrialised the process; his coal-powered factories in Newcastle upon Tyne produced much stronger bottles than were available in France. As a result, the English could deliberately induce a secondary fermentation in wine without the risk of blowing up the bottle, long before Dom Pérignon is traditionally considered to have invented sparkling wine in Champagne around 1697.

Although Merret appears to have been more interested in making glass than in making wine, producers of English sparkling wine such as Ridgeview have been quick to use his name as a generic term to describe their wines.

== Death ==
He died at his home near the chapel in Hatton Garden, on 19 August 1695, and was buried at St Andrew's, Holborn.

== Publications ==
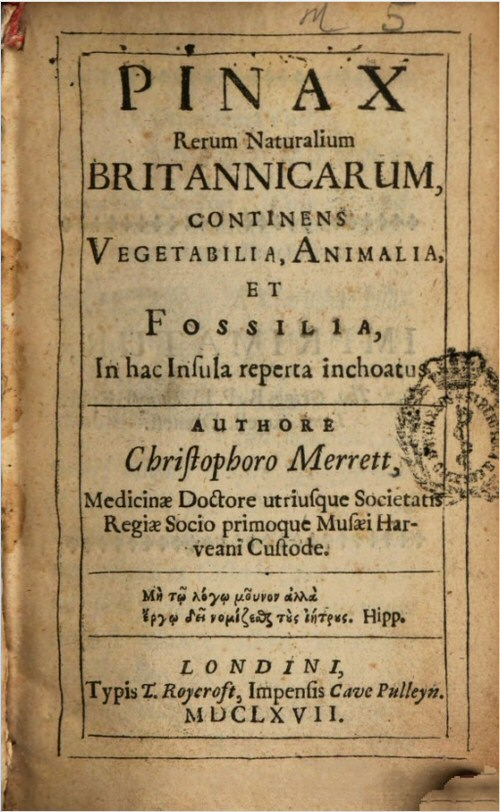
Title page of Merrett's Pinax Rerum Naturalium Britannicarum, 1666

- The Art of Glass, wherein are shown the wayes to make and colour Glass, Pastes, Enamels, Lakes, and other Curiosities. Written in Italian by Antonio Neri, and translated into English, with some observations on the author. Printed by Octavian Pulleyn, at the Sign of the Rose in St. Paul's Church-yard, London, 1662.
- Pinax Rerum Naturalium Britannicarum, continens Vegetabilia, Animalia, et Fossilia. Londini : Impensis Cave Pulleyn ad insigne Rosae in Coemeterio Divi Pauli, typis F. & T. Warren, 1666.

The following papers ascribed to Merret were published in the Philosophical Transactions of the Royal Society, although the last two were published in the year of his death and attributed to "Mr. Merret, Surveyor of the Port of Boston", which may have been his son Christopher.

- Observations concerning the uniting of barks of trees cut, to the tree itself. Phil. Trans. R. Soc. Lond. II, 453–454 (abridged version, III, 706).
- An experiment on Aloe Americana serrati-folia weighed; seeming to import a circulation of the sappe in plants. Phil. Trans. R. Soc. Lond. II, 455–457 (abridged version, II, 645–646).
- An experiment of making cherry-trees, that have withered fruit, to bear full and good fruit; and recovering the almost withered fruit. Phil. Trans. R. Soc. Lond. II, 455 (abridged version, II, 652)
- A relation of the tinn-mines, and working of tinn in the county of Cornwal. Phil. Trans. R. Soc. Lond. XII, 949–952.
- The art of refining. Phil. Trans. R. Soc. Lond. XII, 1046–1052.
- A description of several kinds of granaries, as those of London, of Dantzick, and in Muscovy. Phil. Trans. R. Soc. Lond. II, 464–467.
- An account of several observables in Lincolnshire, not taken notice of in Camden, or any other author. Phil. Trans. R. Soc. Lond. XIX, 343–353 (abridged version, III, 533).
- A table of the washes in Lincolnshire. Phil. Trans. R. Soc. Lond. XIX, 392 (abridged version, II, 267).
