= Liqueur de tirage =

Liqueur de tirage (from French) is a mixture of still wine, sugar, and yeast added to blended base wines to induce a secondary fermentation. This process is central to the production of most sparkling wines, particularly those produced via the traditional method.

== Function ==
The addition of liqueur de tirage provokes a second alcoholic fermentation within the wine, a process known in French as prise de mousse. During this phase, the yeast metabolizes the sugar, producing alcohol and carbon dioxide (CO_{2}). The winemaker's goal is to keep this gas dissolved in the liquid; when the bottle is eventually opened, the pressurized gas expands to return to a gaseous state, creating the wine's characteristic bubbles (mousse).

This method contrasts with the ancestral method (used for Gaillac and Blanquette de Limoux) and the Dioise method (used for Clairette de Die), where carbonation is achieved by bottling wine that has not yet completed its primary fermentation, utilizing the natural residual grape sugar rather than an added liqueur.

Liqueur de tirage should not be confused with liqueur de dosage, which is added later in the process to adjust the sweetness of the wine.

== Composition and regulation ==
According to Article 2b of EU Regulation 2332/1992, liqueur de tirage may only consist of the following substances:

- Yeast, either as dry yeast or in suspension in wine;
- Sugar in the form of sucrose;
- Grape must concentrate; or
- Rectified concentrated grape must (RTK).

== Terminology ==
While the term tirage usually refers to the additive mixture, it is also sometimes used to describe the entire period during which the sparkling wine matures on the lees of the second fermentation.

== See also ==
- Sparkling wine production

== Sources ==
- "Council Regulation (EEC) No 2332/92 of 13 July 1992 on sparkling wines produced in the Community". EUR-Lex. 1992-07-13.
- Harding, Julia; Robinson, Jancis (2023). "tirage". The Oxford Companion to Wine (5th ed.). Oxford University Press. ISBN 978-0-19-887131-6.
- Troost, Gerhard; Bach, Hans Peter; Rhein, Otto H. (1995). Sekt, Schaumwein, Perlwein [Sekt, Sparkling Wine, Semi-Sparkling Wine] (in German) (2nd ed.). Eugen Ulmer. ISBN 3-8001-5818-3.
