= Dosage (wine) =

Addition to sparkling wine

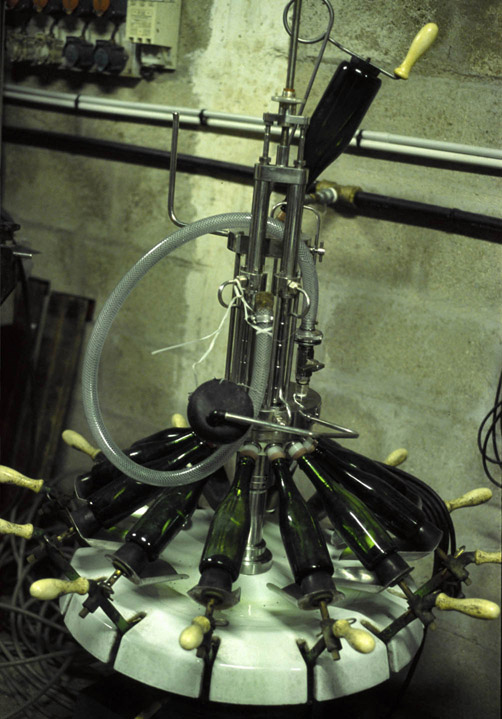
Machine for dosage

Dosage is the final addition to a sparkling wine that determines the level of sweetness, or residual sugar, in the finished wine. In the case of wines produced via the traditional method, the dosage also serves to top up the bottle.

== Terminology ==
In French, this addition is known as the liqueur de dosage or liqueur d’expédition. It should not be confused with the liqueur de tirage, which is added earlier in the process to induce secondary fermentation. In French technical terminology, a distinction is made between the liqueur d'expédition (the liquid mixture itself) and the dosage (the act of addition and the specific quantity of sugar).

In Spanish, the term is licor de expedición; and in Italian, the dosage is referred to as sciroppo di dosaggio.

== Composition and purpose ==
For traditional-method wines, the dosage typically consists of a mixture of wine and sugar syrup (generally derived from cane or beet sugar). In Champagne, the composition of the liqueur d'expédition varies by production house and by product. Some houses choose to include Esprit de Cognac in the mixture.

Its primary function is to balance the wine on the palate; Champagne is naturally so high in acidity that even versions with relatively high levels of residual sugar can taste "bone dry". However, extended autolysis or bottle aging can serve as excellent substitutes for sugar addition. Generally, the older the wine, the lower the dosage required to achieve balance, while younger wines may require more.

=== Method of addition ===
In the traditional method, the dosage is added after the disgorgement process. This is typically performed à la glace (by freezing the neck of the bottle in brine), after which the crown cap is removed. The high pressure within the bottle expels the frozen plug of yeast cells (lees), resulting in a loss of liquid volume.

This volume is replaced by the dosage (or by the same wine for zero-dosage styles). Finally, the cork is inserted and secured to the neck with a metal wire cage known as a muselet, an invention attributed to Dom Pérignon.

In the transfer method, the wine is transferred into a tank where it is filtered to remove sediment. The liqueur de dosage is added to the tank before the wine is bottled for final consumption.

== Styles and trends ==
The desired amount of residual sugar in champagne varied by time and market. For example, at the end of the 19th century, goût anglais (English taste), was defined as quite dry 22–66 grams per liter (g/l), while goût russe (Russian taste) was measured at 273–330 g/l.

The 21st century has seen a fashion for Champagnes produced with no dosage, often referred to as "zero dosage".

=== EU classification ===
Within the European Union, the legal classification of sweetness levels for sparkling wine and Champagne is determined by the grams per liter (g/l) of residual sugar. This classification must be displayed on the wine label.

EU classification of sweetness levels for Champagne and sparkling wine
Residual sugar, g/l	Example descriptions
< 3 (with no sugar added after second fermentation)	brut nature / naturherb / bruto natural / pas dosé / zéro dosage
0–6	extra brut / extra herb / extra bruto
< 12	brut / herb / bruto
12–17	extra dry / extra trocken / extra seco / extra sec
17–32	sec / trocken / secco (or asciutto) / dry / seco
32–50	demi-sec / halbtrocken / abboccato / medium dry / semi seco
> 50	doux / mild / dolce / sweet / dulce

== Sources ==
- Harding, Julia; Robinson, Jancis; Thomas, Tara Q. (2023). "dosage, goût". The Oxford Companion to Wine (5th ed.). Oxford University Press. ISBN 978-0-19-887131-6.
- "Dosage". Union des Maisons de Champagne.
