= Sparkling wine production =

Method in wine production

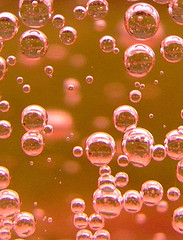
Conspicuous, effervescent bubbles of carbon dioxide, the defining feature of all sparkling wines regardless of method.

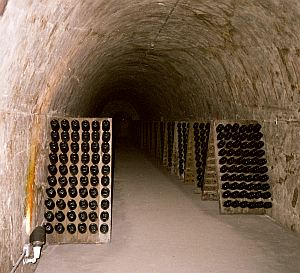
Champagne bottles in racks in underground cellars

Sparkling wine production is the method of winemaking used to produce sparkling wine. The oldest known production of sparkling wine took place in 1531 with the ancestral method.

== Pressure and terminology ==
In popular parlance and also in the title of this article the term "sparkling" is used for all wines that produce bubbles at the surface after opening. Under EU law the term "sparkling" has a special meaning that does not include all wines that produce bubbles. For this reason the terms "fizzy" and "effervescent" are sometimes used to include all bubbly wines.

The following terms are increasingly used to designate different bottle pressures:

- Beady is a wine with less than 1 additional bar (15 psi) of pressure.
- Semi-sparkling is a wine with 1 to 2.5 additional bars (15 to 36 psi) of pressure. Semi-sparkling wines include wines labelled as Frizzante, Spritzig, Pétillant and Pearl.
- Sparkling is a wine with above 3 additional bars (44 psi) of pressure. This is the only wine that can be labelled as sparkling under EU law. Sparkling wines include wines labelled as Champagne, Cava, Mousseux, Crémant, Espumoso, Sekt and Spumante.

== Production methods ==
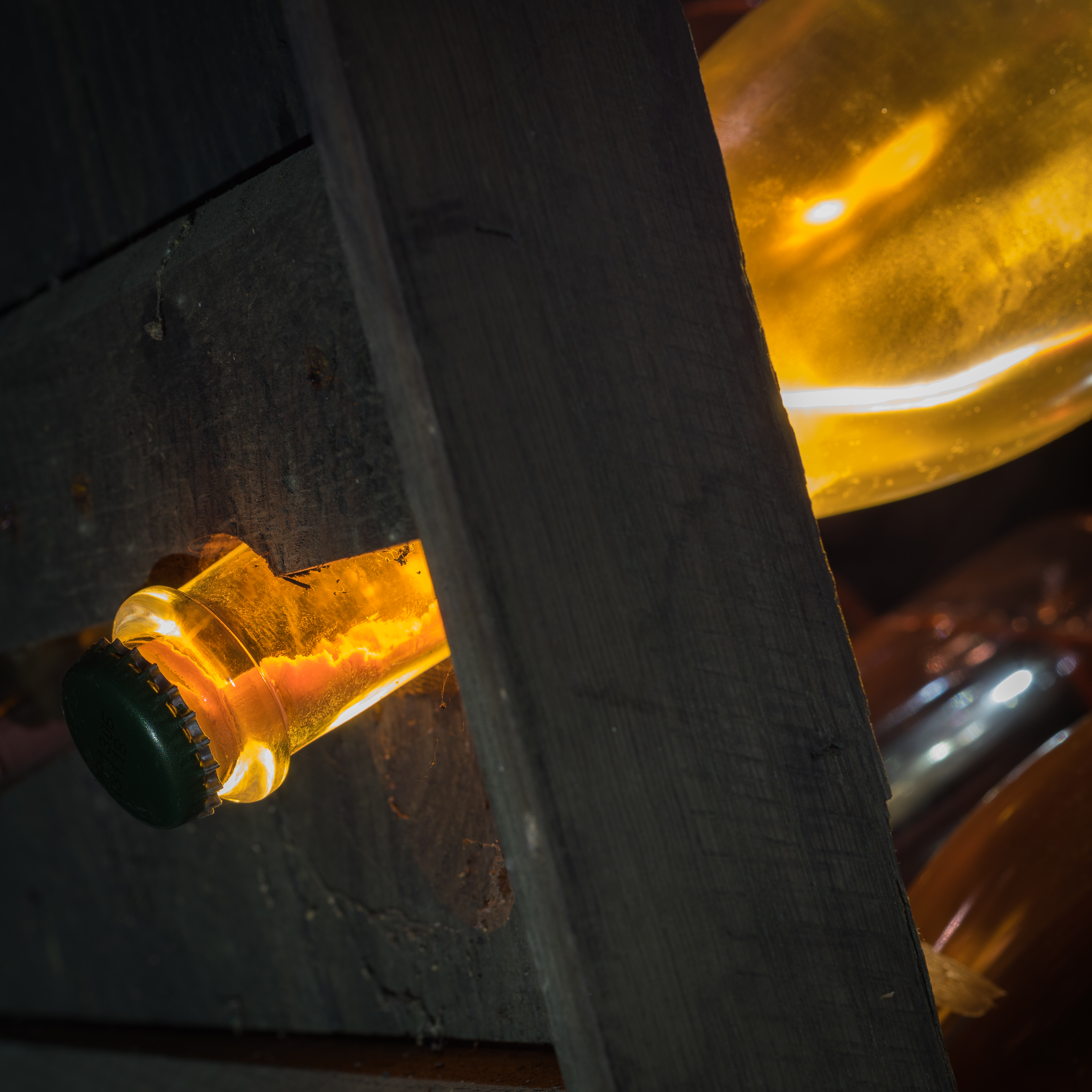
Yeast in a bottle in riddling (remuage) rack at Schramsberg Vineyards, Napa

Fermentation of sugar into alcohol during winemaking always means that carbon dioxide is released. Carbon dioxide has the property of being very soluble in water (the main constituent of wine), a property that is utilized in sparkling wines. Production always starts from a base wine (where the carbon dioxide from the first fermentation has been gasified). In Champagne production, the base wine is usually a blend of wines from different grape varieties and different wineries, where the distribution gives the final wine its special character, called cuvée. In some commonly used methods the base wine undergoes a secondary fermentation, which encloses the resulting carbon dioxide under excess pressure and binds it to the liquid in the sparkling wine. In this way the carbon dioxide content is created which, after opening the bottle, produces the bubbles. The dead yeast cells form a precipitate called lees, that often help with appealing aromas to the sparkling wine but look unappetizing. The lees are therefore normally removed before the wine is distributed.

There is some consensus that the methods where the second fermentation occurs in the bottle are usually preferable to the others.

The following table shows the main features of seven main methods used to make sparkling wines. The methods are then described in the text. Within each method there may be variations from one producer to another.

Production step		Traditional method	Ancestral method	Transfer method	Dioise method	Charmat method	Continuous method	Soda method
Preliminary stages	Production of base wine and (usually) blending cuvée using normal technique	Yes	Yes	Yes	Yes	Yes	Yes	Yes
Preliminary stages	Tirage (Note: Addition of yeast, nutrients for the yeast, and sugar)	Yes	-	Yes	-	Yes	Yes	-
Preliminary stages	Bottling	Yes	Yes	Yes	Yes	-	-	-
Second fermentation	In bottle	Yes	Yes	Yes	Yes	-	-	-
Second fermentation	In steel tank	-	-	-	-	Yes	Yes	-
Second fermentation	Riddling (Note: Bottles are turned with the neck downwards and lightly shaken to move the lees to the neck of the bottle)	Yes	(Yes) (Note: Producer specific variation within the ancestral method)	(Yes) (Note: Riddling and disgorging only in the transversage variant of the transfer method)	-	-	-	-
Second fermentation	Disgorging (Note: The process to remove lees from bottles)	Yes	(Yes)	(Yes)	-	-	-	-
Second fermentation	Emptying, cleaning	-	-	Yes	Yes	-	-	-
Second fermentation	Filtering	-	(Yes)	Yes	Yes	Yes	-	-
Second fermentation	Dosage (Note: Sugar addition)	Yes	-	Yes	-	Yes	-	-
Final stages	Addition of carbon dioxide	-	-	-	-	-	-	Yes
Final stages	Clarification/filtration	-	-	(Yes) (Note: No clarification step after tank storage in the transversage variant of the transfer method, since this has already been taken care of in the riddling and disgorging steps)	Yes	Yes	Yes	-
Final stages	CO_{2} stabilization	-	-	-	-	Yes	Yes	Yes
Final stages	Bottling	-	-	Yes	Yes	Yes	Yes	Yes
Final stages	Corking, labeling, etc.	Yes	Yes	Yes	Yes	Yes	Yes	Yes

=== Traditional method ===
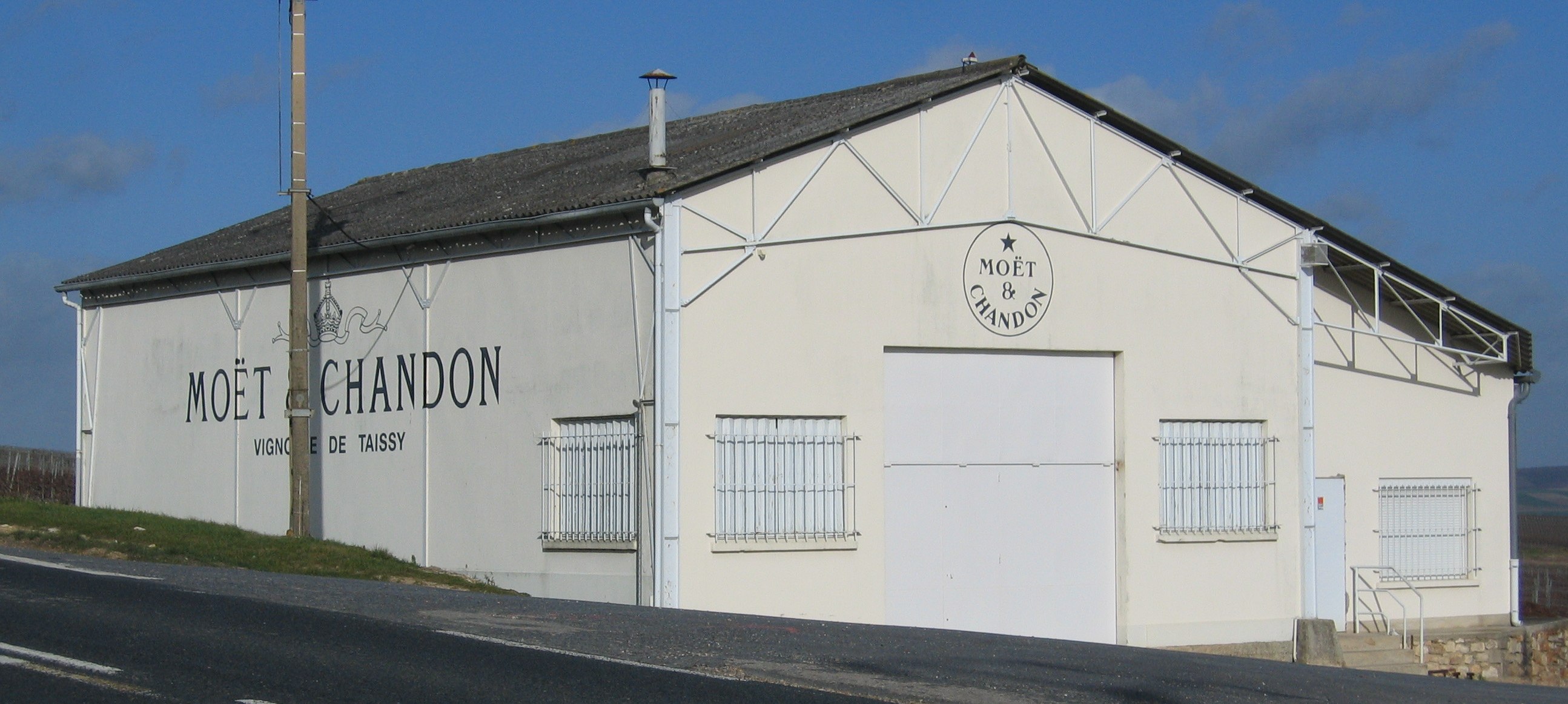
The larger Champagne producers have a number of press houses situated throughout the region, such as this Moët & Chandon facility.

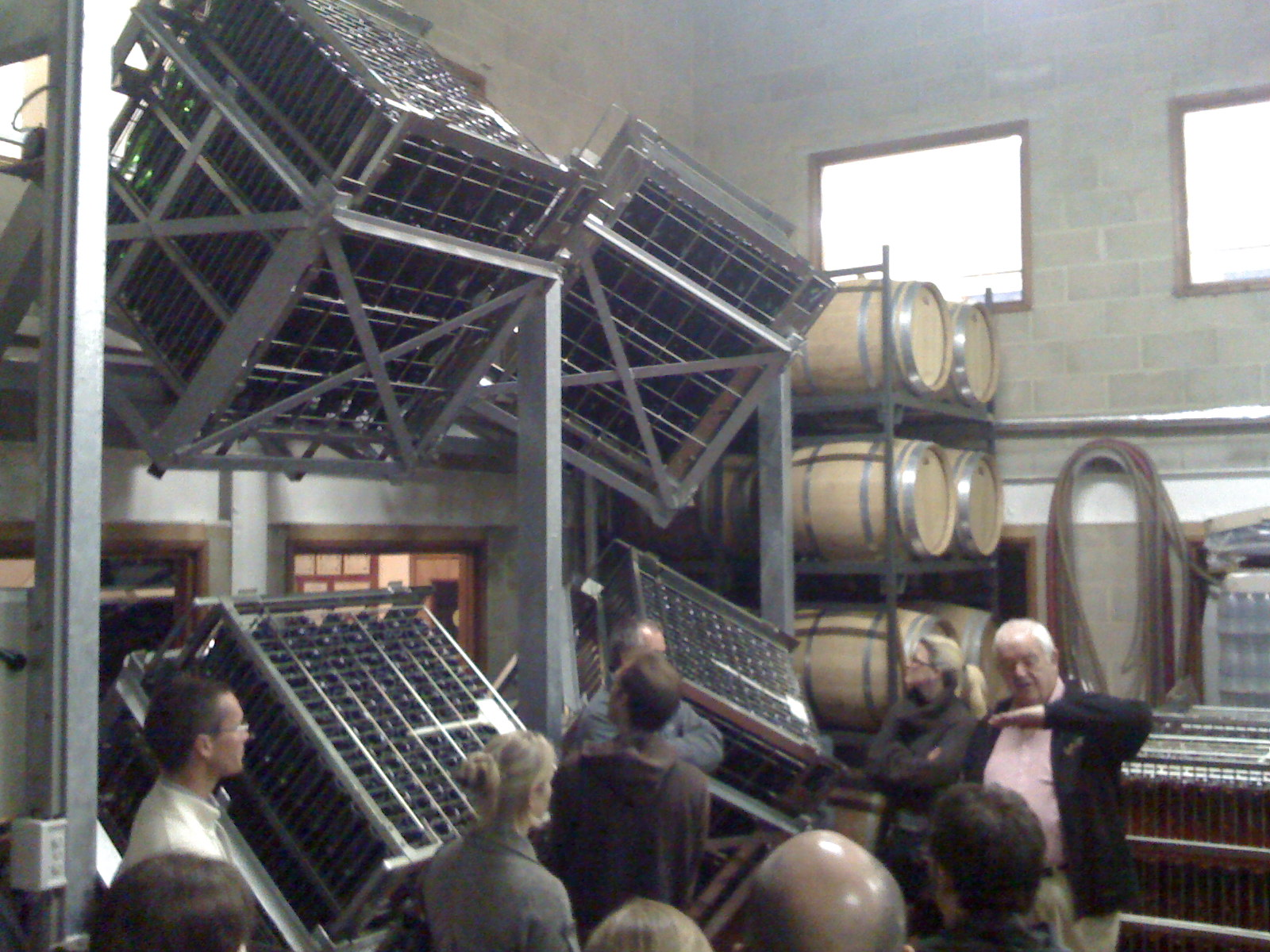
Today Gyropalettes usually replace hand power for riddling in the traditional method.

The so-called classic way (though not the oldest) to produce sparkling wine is popularly known as the traditional method (French: méthode traditionnelle), or the official EU designation, classic method (méthode classique). In 1994 the designation Champagne method (méthode champenoise) was disallowed as it was too often involved in renommée passing off. (Note: The term "méthode champenoise" or "Champagne method" was outlawed in Europe in 1994 for all wines other than Champagne (which for obvious reasons does not bother to utilize it), replaced with "traditional method". On labels it may be referred to as "méthode traditionnelle", "méthode classique", "traditional method", "classic method", or the ambiguous term "bottle fermented".) As the former designation suggests, the method is used for the production of most Champagne, and it is slightly more expensive than the Charmat method. Champagne in bottles of 375 ml, 750 ml and 1.5 liters must be produced with the traditional method, but smaller and larger bottles are usually produced with the transfer method.

The wine is fermented once in the barrel and then undergoes a second fermentation in the bottle after the addition of yeast, nutrients for the yeast, and sugar (known as tirage). The second fermentation results in a natural sparkling wine. Yeast precipitate (lees) must then be removed. This begins with riddling (remuage) which means that the bottles are turned with the neck downwards and lightly shaken to move the lees to the neck of the bottle. This is done in small steps where the bottle orientation gradually changes. Finally the inverted bottle necks are cooled so that the precipitation freezes to a small block of ice, the bottles are turned upright and the temporary closure (normally a crown cap) is opened so that the precipitate is pushed out by the pressure in the bottle. Then the bottle is filled to replace the missing volume, and fitted with a plain Champagne cork and halter. The process to remove lees is called disgorging.

Historically the various stages were performed manually but the whole process is now automated for most wines. In connection with the filling of the missing volume, it is common to add a certain amount of sugar dissolved in wine to give the sparkling wine a smoother taste. Sugar addition is called dosage and the added liquid liqueur d'expedition.

In many cases the wine is stored on the lees – sur lie – under carbon dioxide pressure for a long time before disgorging takes place, to get a more mature character. The requirement for non-vintage Champagne is at least 15 months of storage on the lees, and for vintage Champagne at least three years.

The traditional method is used for Champagne, all European wines with the designation Crémant, Cava, some varieties of Sekt and other sparkling wines that have méthode traditionnelle, méthode classique or fermented in this bottle on the label (note, however, that the unusual ancestral and Dioise methods also ferment the wine exclusively in the bottle).

=== Ancestral method ===
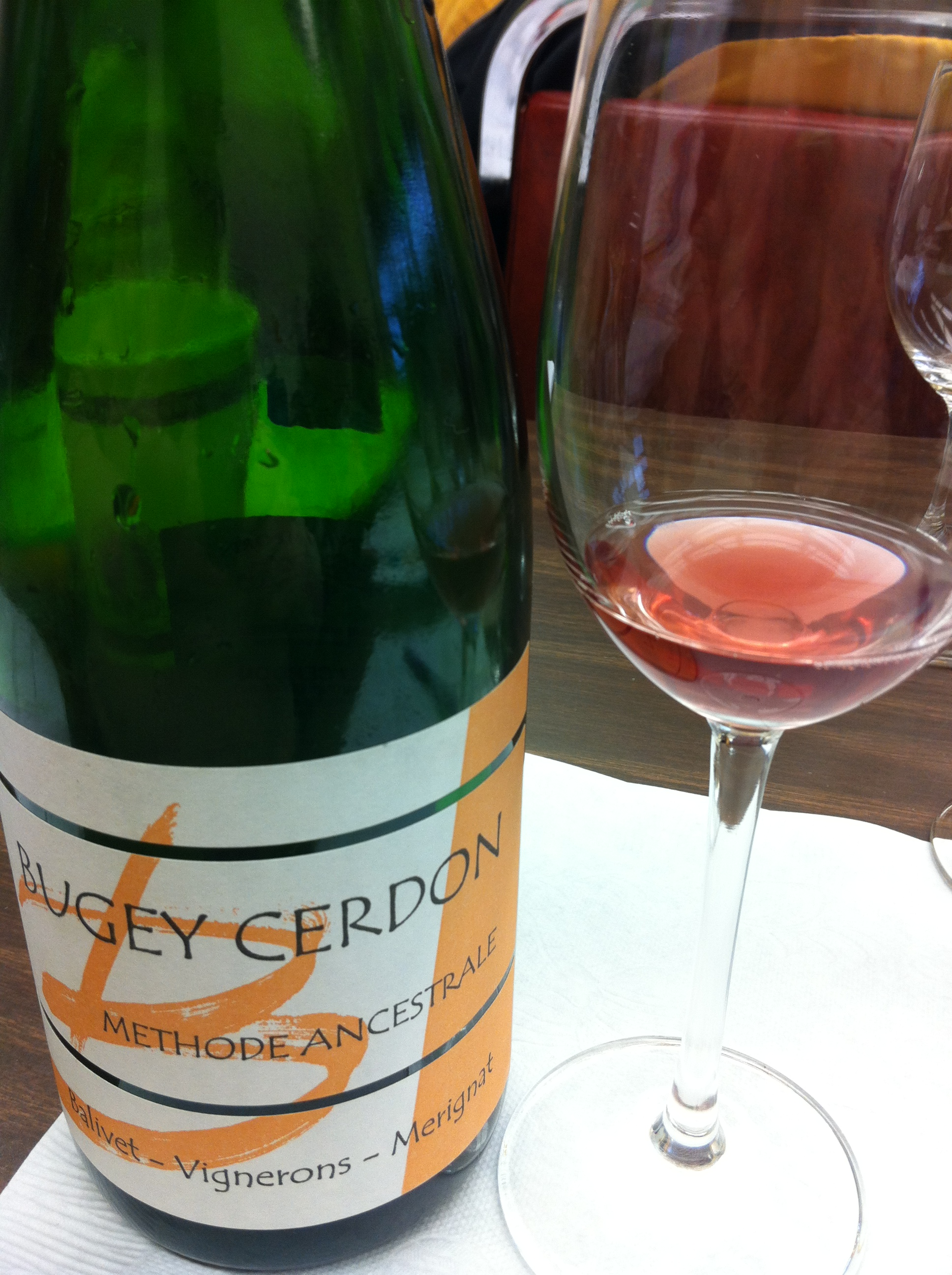
Bugey Cerdon produced with the ancestral method

The ancestral method (French: méthode ancestrale) goes under many local names in the various French regions, such as rurale, artisanale and gaillacoise. This is by far the oldest method of making sparkling wine and preceded the traditional method by almost 200 years, or possibly even more. The wine that is now called Blanquette de Limoux is considered by wine historians to be the world's first sparkling wine, and was produced in Limoux in 1531 by monks in the monastery of Saint-Hilaire. Wines produced using the ancestral method include among others French wines from Gaillac, Bugey Cerdon and Blanquette de Limoux, German wines from a few vineyards where the method is usually called méthode rural, and some North American wines. In Italy the name given to a traditional version of the ancestral method is Col Fondo, which is a process whereby the wine from a harvest is fermented dry and has fresh juice from the following harvest added and is then bottled and released undisgorged. Col Fondo is a variant on the pét-nat intermission method, however producers are increasingly dropping the word from their labels as the name was trademarked in 2002 by two local wineries (as the spelling Colfondo). Although these wineries are not enforcing their trademark rights, they have been unable to come to an agreement with the Consorzio. Under new DOCG law, from 2020 Col Fondo wines will be labelled as Sui Lieviti.

Wines made with the ancestral method are sometimes called pétillant-naturel, popularly abbreviated to pét-nat. Since French wine label regulations ban the word naturel, the appellation from Montlouis-sur-Loire is instead called pétillant originel.

Pét-nat as a general term indicates a style of wine not a specific production method. Within the overall umbrella category of pét-nat there are two general approaches employed by winemakers, the choice of which is often determined by location and weather conditions during harvest as well as the scale of production and resources on hand in the winery when it comes to bottling. The first is the "interruption" method, whereby the primary alcoholic fermentation is interrupted by the act of bottling. The wine goes into bottle, sealed under a crown cap, where the still viable yeast, nutrient and sugar allow the primary fermentation to continue and produce the carbon dioxide that forms the bubbles. Malolactic fermentation may also occur in bottle making a small contribution to the carbon dioxide levels. Unlike the traditional method there is no disgorging and dosage, however producers using the interruption method will often need to remove tartrate crystals and sediment to prevent the wine from gushing when opened as well as to reduce the amount of final sediment to an acceptable level. To accomplish this, the bottles are hand disgorged and topped up with the same wine. The interruption method is often favoured by producers in cooler regions where the fermentation is slower and easier to interrupt at a specific point and where they have the resources to hand bottle at a specific time and to hand disgorge. The second method is called "entr'acte" (intermission) whereby the primary fermentation is completed to dryness, allowing the wine to be naturally cold stabilised and settled, either in an underground cellar or temperature controlled tank. Sweet juice from a second pick of grapes, or from frozen juice held back after harvest, often from the same vineyard, is then added to the wine, which is then bottled with the fermentation from the second pick juice completing in bottle to produce the bubbles. The advantages of the entr'acte (intermission) method is that the wine does not need to be disgorged, there is more control over final sediment and pressure levels leading to an avoidance of gushing. The entr'acte method is often favoured in warmer climates where faster ferments are more difficult to control, as well as where producers want to be more precise with final turbidity and pressure levels as well as minimising overall risk. The entr'acte (intermission) method borrows from both the French methode ancestral (interruption) method and the Italian Col Fondo method, taking elements of both, and although it is sometimes confused with Col Fondo it is distinctly different as the intermission method uses grapes from just one harvest, whereas true Col Fondo uses grapes from two consecutive harvests. The intermission method is how the majority of the world's pét-nats are made, due to the greater control it offers winemakers over timing, turbidity and pressure. Alternatively, using a method faithful to the origins of ancestral winemaking, the wine is cold-settled before the end of primary fermentation to mimic the natural changing seasons before being bottled and then allowed to warm up again, as it would in the Spring. This process, a traditional variation on the entr'acte practice, is called the "Overwintering Method," and is how the earliest sparkling wines would have come about, although as an intentional method of production it runs the risk of a stuck ferment.

Styles of pét-nat can very widely, including a range of colours from white, red, pink and orange (not to be confused with skin contact orange wines). Pressure levels can also vary from lightly sparkling (around 1 to 2 bars of pressure), to a gentle foam (around 3 bar) to a full fizz (4 to 5 bars). Common flaws are often related to turbidity and pressure, with wines being barely fizzy to gushing. Common faults are those often associated with low / no sulphur winemaking such as mousiness or excessive levels of brettanomyces or volatile acidity. Due to the fermentation being completed in the bottle, pét-nats can often display funky characteristics, not dissimilar to still natural wines, and which represent a stylistic cross-over with traditional styles of sour beer such as lambics and gueuze. Wines can vary from being highly aromatic to relatively neutral depending on the grape varieties used. They often display relatively low alcohol content, although this is purely a winemaker decision. The wines are sometimes obscure from remaining lees (except those which have been clarified by disgorging). They taste best one to three years after bottling and do not develop with further storage. In general, the wines usually finish fermenting in bottle resulting in them being dry, although there can be some variability with final sugar levels. The method's main challenge is that the production process is difficult to control and therefore requires great skill by the winemaker. The keys to pét-nat production are mastering temperature, timing and turbidity. The volumes produced are very modest. High-quality wines produced with the ancestral method, often by small growers using organic farming principles, can be complex and very distinctive. Visual cues that distinguish pét-nat from other sparkling wines are a sparkling weight bottle, closed with a crown cap, with a wine that is often a little bit cloudy. Pét-nat can be enjoyed as an aperitif or with fruit dishes, however their growing global appeal is as the sparkling wine of choice in the natural wine movement.

=== Transfer method ===
The transfer method follows the first steps of the traditional method in that after primary fermentation the cuvée is transferred to bottles to complete secondary fermentation, which allows for additional complexity. When the secondary fermentation is complete and the wine has spent the desired amount of time in bottle on yeast lees (six months is the requirement to label a wine 'bottle fermented') then the individual bottles are transferred (hence the name) into a larger tank. The wine is then filtered, liqueur de dosage added, and then filled back into new bottles for sale. This method allows for complexity to be built into the wine, but also gives scope for blending options after the wine has gone into bottle and reduces the bottle-to-bottle variations that can be hard to control in the traditional method.

The name transversage method is often used as a synonym to transfer method, but is actually a slight twist to the latter. In the transfer method proper, the wine is transferred to a tank directly after ageing on lees, while in the transversage method, the wine is riddled and disgorged before transfer to a tank. Consequently, the transversage method doesn't need additional clarification before bottling.

Sparkling wines from New Zealand and Australia often use the transfer method. The method is used for sparkling wine sold in unusually small or unusually large bottles.

=== Dioise method ===
This method is used for Clairette de Die AOC where the method is officially designated as the "original dioise process". In contrast to the ancestral method the yeast production is controlled by cooling. The dioise method is used in among others the Drôme valley in France, as well as for Asti Spumante produced in Canelli in the Piedmont region in Italy.

=== Charmat method ===
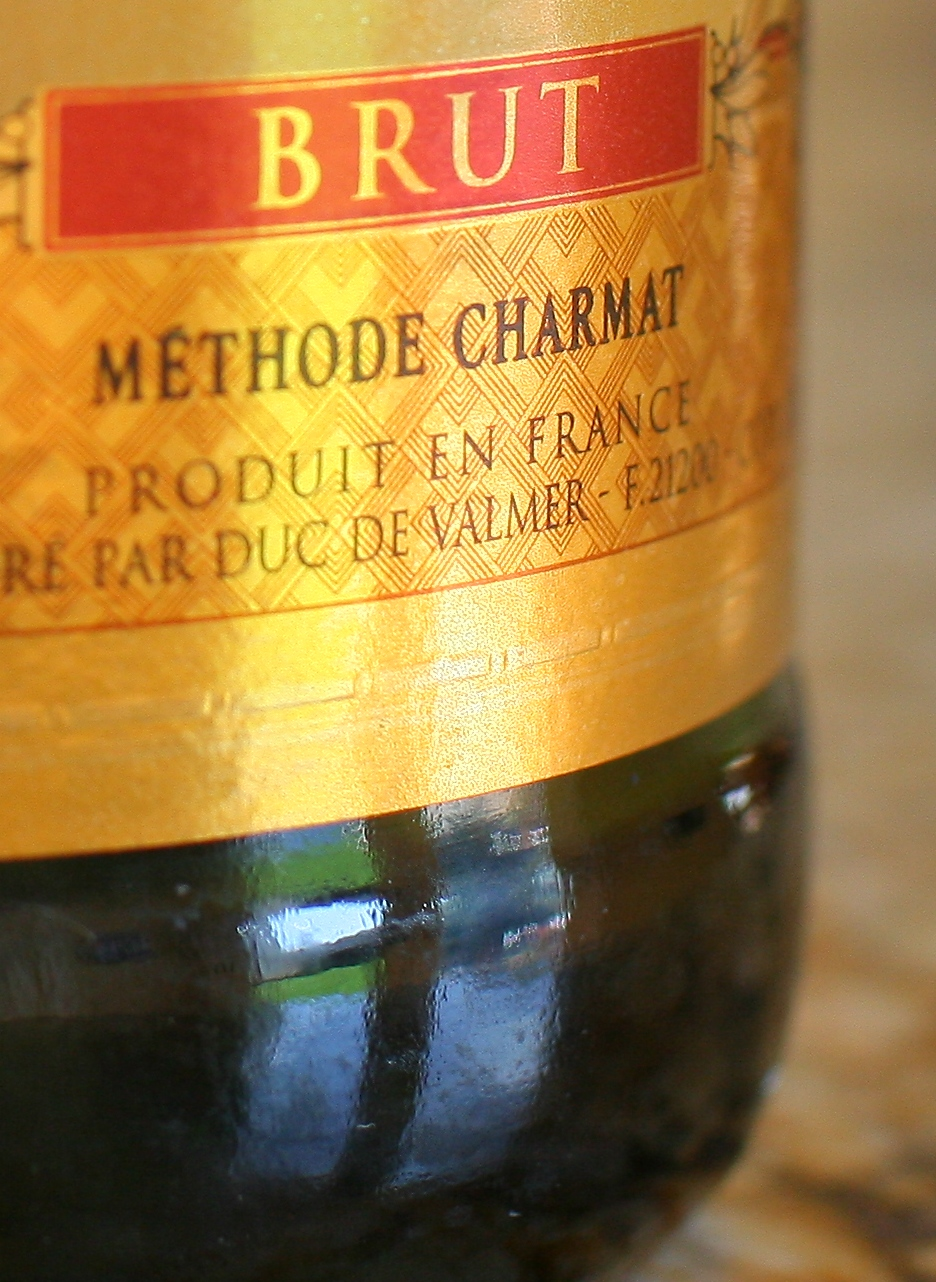
Label detail of a French sparkling wine made using the Charmat process

The Charmat process (Italian: Metodo Martinotti) was first patented in 1895 by the Italian winemaker Federico Martinotti (1860–1924). The method was further improved with a later patent by the French inventor Eugène Charmat in 1907. The method is now named after the latter, but is also called cuve close, metodo Italiano or "the tank method". The wine is mixed in a stainless steel pressure tank, together with sugar and yeast. Fermentation occurs in a closed system, so CO_{2} cannot directly escape to the atmosphere and dissolves in wine. When the sugar is converted into alcohol and carbon dioxide, the yeast is filtered and removed, and the wine containing the dissolved CO_{2} is transferred from the closed reactor vessel into bottles. The duration of fermentation affects the quality; longer fermentation preserves the wine's aromas better and gives finer and more durable bubbles.

This production method is widely used in the U.S.; in Italy, especially in the Asti province, and in Prosecco wines; and in Germany to produce variants of Sekt such as Henkell Trocken. Charmat-method sparkling wines can be produced at a considerably lower cost than traditional method wines.

=== Continuous method ===
The continuous method is also called the Russian method. The secondary fermentation takes place in steel tanks with special rings, or with added oak chips. The wine circulates slowly and becomes reasonably clear before it is bottled.

Sovetskoye Shampanskoye, "Soviet Champagne", or under European Union law "Soviet sparkling wine", is produced by the continuous method in Russia and former Soviet Union countries.

=== Soda method ===
Simpler, cheaper sparkling wines are manufactured simply by adding CO_{2} to the wine from a carbonator. The bubbles created by using this method will be relatively large and volatile. In the European Union sparkling wines made via this method must use terms "aerated sparkling wine" and "aerated semi-sparkling wine", supplemented where necessary with the words "obtained by adding carbon dioxide" or "obtained by adding carbon anhydride".

== Wine faults ==
Several wine faults can occur in sparkling wine production. Some that were present in early production methods include yeux de crapauds ("toad's eyes") which was a condition of big, viscous bubbles that resulted from the wine spending too much time in wooden casks. Another fault could occur when the wine is exposed to bacteria or direct sunlight, leaving the wine with murky colouring and an oily texture.
