= Madame Clicquot Ponsardin =

French Champagne producer (1777–1866)

Madame Clicquot
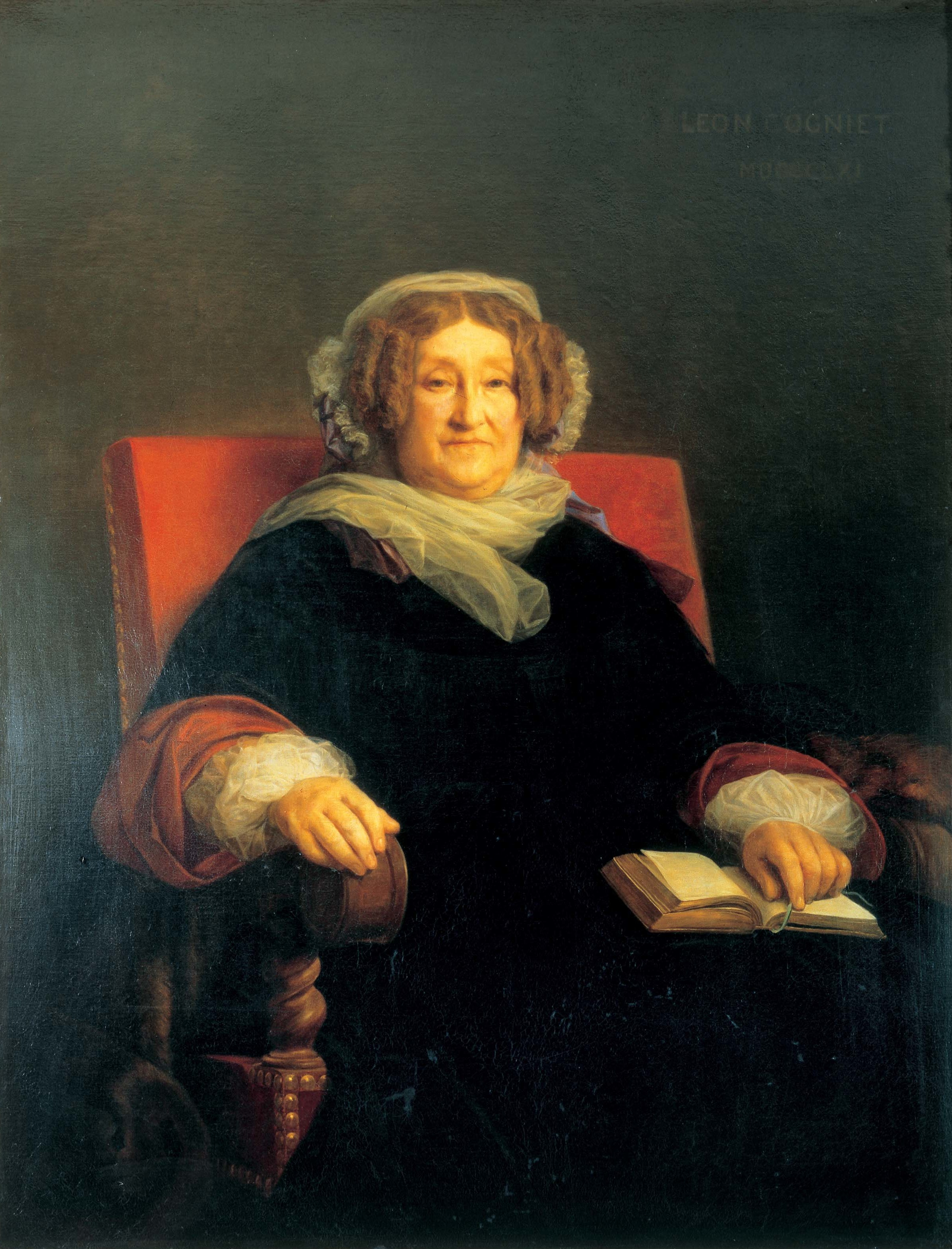
- c. 1860
- Born: Barbe-Nicole Ponsardin; 16 December 1777; Reims, Champagne, Kingdom of France
- Died: 29 July 1866 (aged 88); Boursault, Marne, Second French Empire
- Occupation: Champagne producer
- Years active: 1805–1866
- Organization: Veuve Clicquot
- Spouse: François Clicquot (m. 1798; died 1805)

Madame Clicquot (French: [madam kliko]; née Barbe-Nicole Ponsardin [baʁb nikɔl pɔ̃saʁdɛ̃]; 16 December 1777 – 29 July 1866), also known as Barbe Nicole Clicquot Ponsardin, Widow Clicquot, Veuve Clicquot, and the Grande Dame of Champagne, was a French Champagne producer. She took on her husband's wine business when widowed at 27. Under her ownership, and her skill with wine, the company developed early Champagne using a novel technique. The brand and company of Veuve Clicquot Ponsardin still bears her name.

== Biography ==
Barbe-Nicole Ponsardin, born 16 December 1777 in Reims, was the daughter of a wealthy father, Ponce Jean Nicolas Philippe Ponsardin (from 1813, Baron Ponsardin), a textile manufacturer and politician. Her mother was Jeanne Josephe Marie-Clémentine Letertre-Huart. Her childhood was influenced by her father, who was involved in both business and politics. Formerly a royalist, he switched political positions to turn against the monarchy. Thanks to this move, Barbe-Nicole's family escaped the Revolution unscathed. Napoleon and Josephine had both stayed at L'Hôtel Ponsardin, her family's home (not a hôtel in the modern sense). Her father was made mayor of Reims by Napoleon's decree.

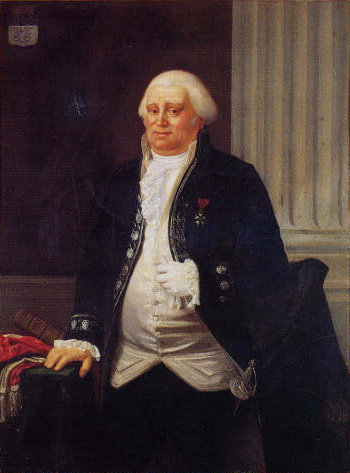
Portrait of Nicolas Ponsardin, donated to the city of Reims by his daughter

Like Nicholas Ponsardin, Philippe Clicquot ran a successful textile business. In addition, he was an owner of vineyards in the Champagne country and had established a wine business. In an attempt to consolidate the power of their two businesses, Mr. Ponsardin and Mr. Clicquot arranged a wedding between their children, which was common at the time. Thus, François Clicquot and Barbe-Nicole Ponsardin were married on 10 June 1798. She was 21 at the time of the marriage.

After his marriage, François Clicquot was officially made his father's partner, and in July, the company name was changed to "Clicquot-Muiron et Fils". In August 1801, François Clicquot began a long trip in Europe. Passing through Basel, he met Louis Bohne. Louis Bohne remained a faithful employee of the company all his life and later became a valuable adviser to Madame Clicquot, even though he was usually stationed far away.

In 1801, Philippe Clicquot retired and left control of the companies to his son François. In October 1805, seven years after their wedding, Francois fell suddenly ill with a fever similar to typhoid. He died some days later, at the age of 30. François' death may have been suicide, but it was attributed to typhoid. Thus, Barbe-Nicole was a widow at 27 with a six-year-old daughter, Clémentine. Owing to the marriage, she is also referred to as Barbe Nicole Clicquot Ponsardin.

Both Barbe-Nicole and Philippe were devastated by François' death, and Philippe Clicquot announced his intention of liquidating the company. However, the young widow (veuve in French) went to her father-in-law with a proposal and convinced him to let her manage the business Philippe agreed to her proposal under one condition: Barbe-Nicole would go through an apprenticeship, after which she would be able to run the business herself, if she could prove that she was capable. Thus, Barbe-Nicole overcame convention to become the first woman to take over a champagne house and the first female champagne producer. She entered into an apprenticeship with the winemaker Alexandre Fourneaux, and tried to save the wine business and make it grow. In the early 19th century, the Napoleonic Code denied women civil and political rights, prohibiting them from working, voting, earning money, or entering schools and universities without the consent of their husband or father. At that time, widows were the only women in French society to be free and to be allowed to run their own business.

This left Barbe-Nicole in control of a company variously involved in banking, wool trading, and champagne production. Under Madame Clicquot's control, the house focused entirely on champagne, and thrived using funds supplied by her father-in-law. On 21 July 1810, Barbe-Nicole Ponsardin launched her own company: "Veuve Clicquot-Ponsardin". She is credited with major breakthroughs, creating the first known vintage champagne in 1810 and inventing the riddling table process to clarify champagne in 1816. Prior to this invention of riddling, the second fermentation of wine to create champagne resulted in a very sweet wine with large bubbles and sediment from the remains of the yeast used in the fermentation in the bottle (which creates the bubbles in the wine) resulting in a cloudy wine. She still used the original English technique of adding sugar, but after this second fermentation was complete the bottles were held upside down. The bottles were regularly turned so that the dead yeast would all gather near the cork (riddling). Once the settling was complete, the wine near the cork was removed, followed by an addition of wine to refill the bottle. In 1818, she invented the first known blended rosé champagne by blending still red and white wines, a process still used by the majority of champagne producers.

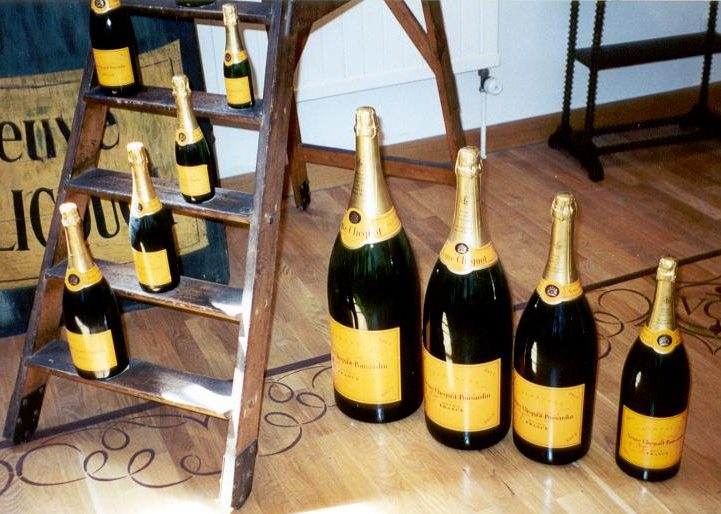
Veuve Clicquot Champagne in a range of bottle sizes

Owing to her achievements as a businesswoman and her invention of three new techniques for making champagne, she became known as the "Grande Dame of Champagne".

== Death and legacy ==
Clicquot died 29 July 1866, in Boursault. She had built the Neo-Renaissance style Château de Boursault in honor of the marriage of her granddaughter Marie Clémentine de Chevigné to Louis de Mortemart-Rochechouart in 1839. Anne de Rochechouart de Mortemart, the daughter of Marie Clémentine and Louis, inherited the chateau on Madame Clicquot's death.

Clicquot's legacy includes three inventions that revolutionised the making of champagne, including three firsts: vintage champagne; the riddling table; and blended rosé champagne.

=== In popular culture ===
In 2019, Lisette Glodowski and Richard C. Walter wrote a musical about Madame Clicquot's life, titled Madame Clicquot: A Revolutionary Musical. The cast recording of the musical was released in 2023. The fully staged musical had its world premiere with the Pittsburgh Civic Light Opera in 2025, starring Victoria Frings as Barbe-Nicole Clicquot Ponsardin and Paolo Montalban as Louis Bohne, directed and choreographed by Laurie Glodowski.

In 2023, Haley Bennett portrayed Clicquot in the film Widow Clicquot which premiered at the Toronto Film Festival; it had its wide release on July 19, 2024. The film is based on Tilar J. Mazzeo's New York Times bestseller The Widow Clicquot: The Story of a Champagne Empire and the Woman Who Ruled It and focuses on "the true story behind the Veuve Clicquot champagne family and business that began in the late 18th century."
