= Widow Clicquot =

2023 film by Thomas Napper

- Theatrical release poster
- Directed by: Thomas Napper
- Screenplay by: Erin Dignam
- Story by: Christopher Monger; Erin Dignam
- Based on: The Widow Clicquot by Tilar Mazzeo
- Produced by: Christina Weiss Lurie; Haley Bennett; Joe Wright
- Starring: Haley Bennett; Tom Sturridge; Sam Riley
- Cinematography: Caroline Champetier
- Edited by: Richard Marizy
- Music by: Bryce Dessner
- Production companies: Fourth and Twenty Eight Films; WME Independent
- Distributed by: Vertical (North America); Vertigo Releasing (United Kingdom and Ireland)
- Release dates: September 11, 2023 (TIFF); July 19, 2024 (United States)
- Running time: 89 minutes
- Countries: United States; United Kingdom; France
- Language: English
- Box office: $2.9 million

Widow Clicquot is a 2023 internationally co-produced period drama film, directed by Thomas Napper, from a screenplay by Erin Dignam and Christopher Monger based on the 2008 book The Widow Clicquot by Tilar J. Mazzeo. It stars Haley Bennett, Tom Sturridge, Sam Riley, Anson Boon, Leo Suter, Ben Miles, and Natasha O'Keeffe.

The film had its world premiere at the Toronto International Film Festival on September 11, 2023.

== Plot ==
In Napoleonic France, Barbe-Nicole Ponsardin Clicquot is widowed by the early death of her beloved husband François, an unsuccessful winemaker. She refuses to sell her husband's vineyards and decides to use her own money to finance the failing business. She institutes unconventional planting techniques, despite the hesitance of her workers and her father-in-law Phillipe. She develops a pink champagne that impresses the Clicquots' friend, wine merchant Louis Bohne, and collaborates with him to smuggle champagne to Amsterdam in defiance of Napoleon's trade embargoes.

The shipment to Amsterdam is lost, devastating Barbe-Nicole. She begins selling off her material possessions in order to keep the winery afloat. However, Louis manages to get a few bottles to Russia, where the sweet wine proves popular in advance of the Great Comet of 1811. After Napoleon's exile, Barbe-Nicole and Louis take advantage of the chaos and begin selling in Russia in earnest.

Barbe-Nicole's success unsettles her male peers, and she is brought to trial for violating a law preventing women from owning business. Her accusers claim that she refuses to marry Louis as remaining a widow would allow her continued ownership of the winery. Barbe-Nicole lambasts her accusers. Louis publicly proposes to her, and she rejects him.

Epilogue cards reveal that Barbe-Nicole never remarried and the business would eventually become the Veuve Clicquot champagne dynasty.

== Cast ==
- Haley Bennett as Barbe-Nicole Ponsardin Clicquot
- Tom Sturridge as François Clicquot
- Sam Riley as Louis Bohne
- Anson Boon as Edouard Werle fr
- Leo Suter as George
- Ben Miles as Philippe Clicquot
- Natasha O'Keeffe as Anne
- Cecily Cleeve as Clementine Clicquot
- Paul Rhys as Droite
- Ian Conningham as Paquet
- Christopher Villers as Nicolas Ponsardin
- Cara Seymour as Jeanne-Marie Ponsardin
- Phoebe Nicholls as Marie-Catherine Clicquot
- Nicholas Farrell as Jean-Rémy Moët
- Chris Larkin as Muller
- Mark Tandy as Magistrate #1
- Antoine Blanquefort as Magistrate #2
- Joseph Rapp as The Priest

== Production ==
In October 2022, it was announced that Haley Bennett, Tom Sturridge, Sam Riley, Leo Suter, and Anson Boon joined the cast of the film, with Thomas Napper set to direct from a screenplay by Erin Dignam and Christopher Monger and Joe Wright set to produce.

Principal photography took place in Chablis and Reims, France, in October 2022.

== Release ==
The film had its world premiere at the Toronto International Film Festival on September 11, 2023. In November 2023, Vertical Entertainment acquired distribution rights to the film. It had a wide release on July 19, 2024. Netflix in the US began streaming the movie from November 16, 2024.

== Reception ==
On the review aggregator website Rotten Tomatoes, 80% of 69 critics' reviews are positive, with an average rating of 6.6/10. The website's consensus reads: "Centering around Haley Bennett's sparkling performance, Widow Clicquot is a visually impressive tale of resilience that leaves a pleasing aftertaste on the palette [sic]." Metacritic, which uses a weighted average, assigned the film a score of 65 out of 100, based on 16 critics, indicating "generally favorable" reviews.

Christian Zilko of IndieWire rated the film a grade B, commenting that "by swapping Bluetooth headsets for bodices, Napper and screenwriters Erin Dignam and Christopher Monger were able to drape their movie in a period aesthetic that should appeal to the arthouse crowd. But from its eureka moment when Barbe-Nicole develops her iconic rose champagne to its final title cards about the company's ongoing success, "Widow Clicquot" has all the same beats as the walk-and-talk business movie that you watched on your last flight." Zilko highlighted the film's mixture of "non-linear narrative structure" and "three-cheers-for-capitalism narrative" along with the "draconian laws" around women in business. He viewed the film as mostly "interested in celebrating the booze industry and the people who overcome needless restrictions to innovate in it."
