= Veuve Clicquot =

French Champagne house

Coordinates: 49.2565777°N 4.0250534°E

Veuve Clicquot Ponsardin
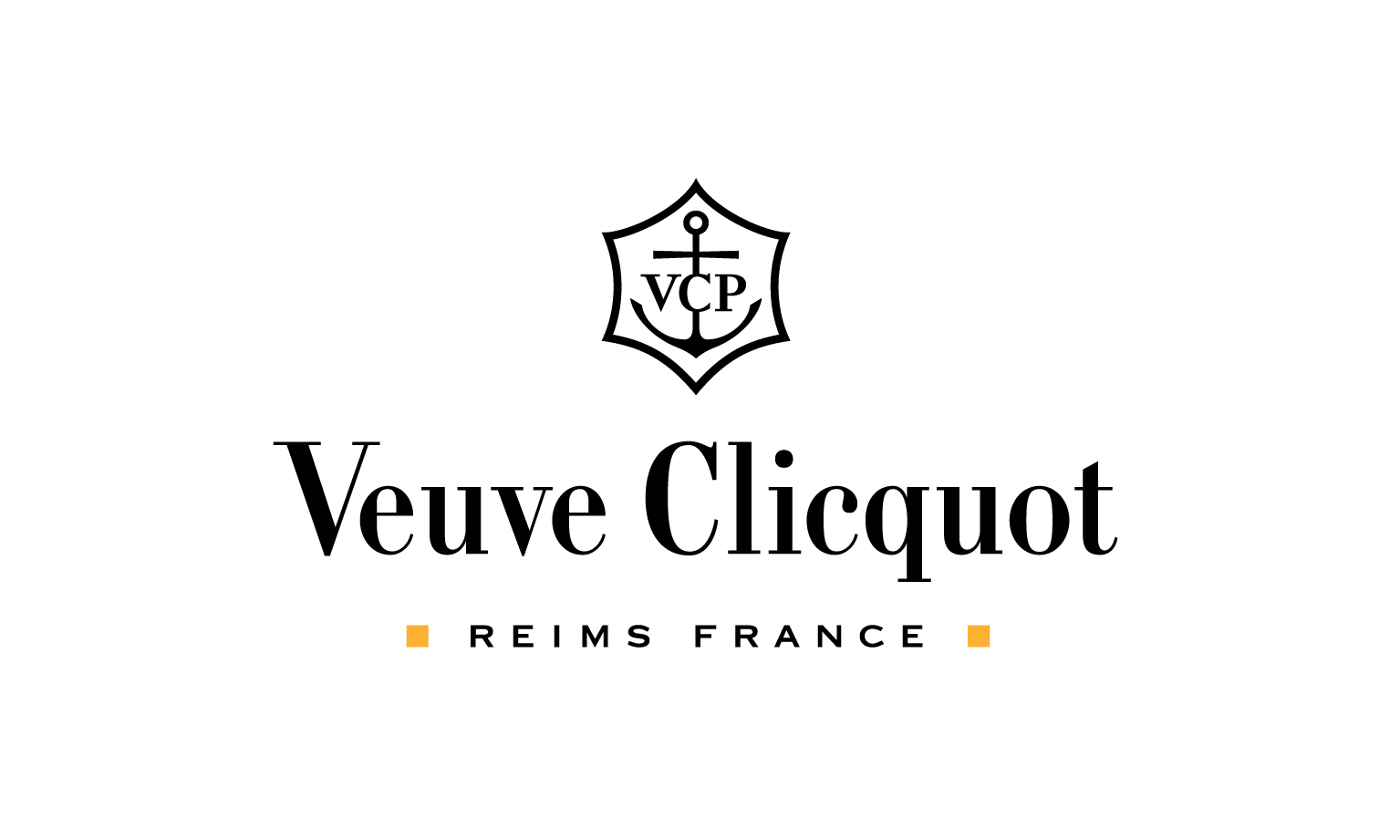
- Industry: Champagne production
- Founded: 1772 (254 years ago)
- Founder: Barbe-Nicole Clicquot-Ponsardin
- Headquarters: 12, Rue du Temple; Reims, France
- Key people: Jean-Marc Gallot (President)
- Parent: LVMH
- Website: www.veuve-clicquot.com

Veuve Clicquot Ponsardin (English: /ˌvɜːv kliːˈkoʊ/, French: [vœv kliko pɔ̃saʁdɛ̃]) is a Champagne house founded in 1772 and based in Reims. It is one of the largest Champagne houses. Madame Clicquot is credited with major breakthroughs, creating the first known vintage champagne in 1810, and inventing the riddling table process to clarify champagne in 1816. In 1818, she invented the first known blended rosé champagne by blending still red and white wines, a process still used by the majority of champagne producers.

During the Napoleonic Wars, Madame Clicquot made strides in establishing her wine in royal courts throughout Europe, notably that of Imperial Russia. She played an important role in establishing Champagne as a favored drink of high society and nobility throughout Europe.

The house has borne its distinctive gold-yellow label since the late 19th century.

The company was purchased in 1986 by Louis Vuitton (now part of LVMH formed in 1987) and continues to expand worldwide.

== History ==
=== Foundation ===
Philippe Clicquot was a successful textile merchant, a banker, and an owner of vineyards in the Champagne country. In 1772, he established a wine business. He quickly decided to bring his champagne wines to foreign palates and soon expanded his clientele. His annual shipments varied from 4,000 bottles a year to 6-7,000 bottles in a good year. However, he kept the primary business focus on textiles.

Nicolas Ponsardin also ran a successful textile business at the same time as Philippe Clicquot. In an attempt to consolidate the power of their two businesses, Ponsardin and Clicquot arranged a wedding between their children, which was common at the time.

François Clicquot and Barbe-Nicole Ponsardin were married on 10 June 1798.

After his marriage, François Clicquot was officially made his father's partner, and in July, the company name was changed to "Clicquot-Muiron et Fils". Sales increased from 8,000 bottles a year in 1796 to 60,000 in 1804. Little by little, all other activities unrelated to champagne industry were abandoned.

François Clicquot greatly expanded the company, putting it on a successful track. He also established a new practice: employing commercial travellers. In August 1801, François Clicquot began a long trip in Europe. Passing through Basel, he met Louis Bohne, who remained a faithful employee of the company all his life and a valuable adviser to Madame Clicquot, even though he was usually stationed far away.

In 1801, Philippe Clicquot retired and left control to his son François.

After various trips through Europe, Louis Bohne came back to Reims in March 1803 with a book full of orders from the largest merchants and most important individual buyers. In the summer of 1804, the Clicquot champagne business first began to grow.

In October 1805, seven years after their wedding, Francois fell suddenly ill with a fever similar to typhoid. He died some days later, at the age of 30.

Both Barbe-Nicole and Philippe were devastated by François' death, and Philippe Clicquot announced his intention of liquidating the company. The young widow (veuve in French) decided, however, to take over her husband's business, becoming one of the first businesswomen in France.

=== Barbe-Nicole Ponsardin ===
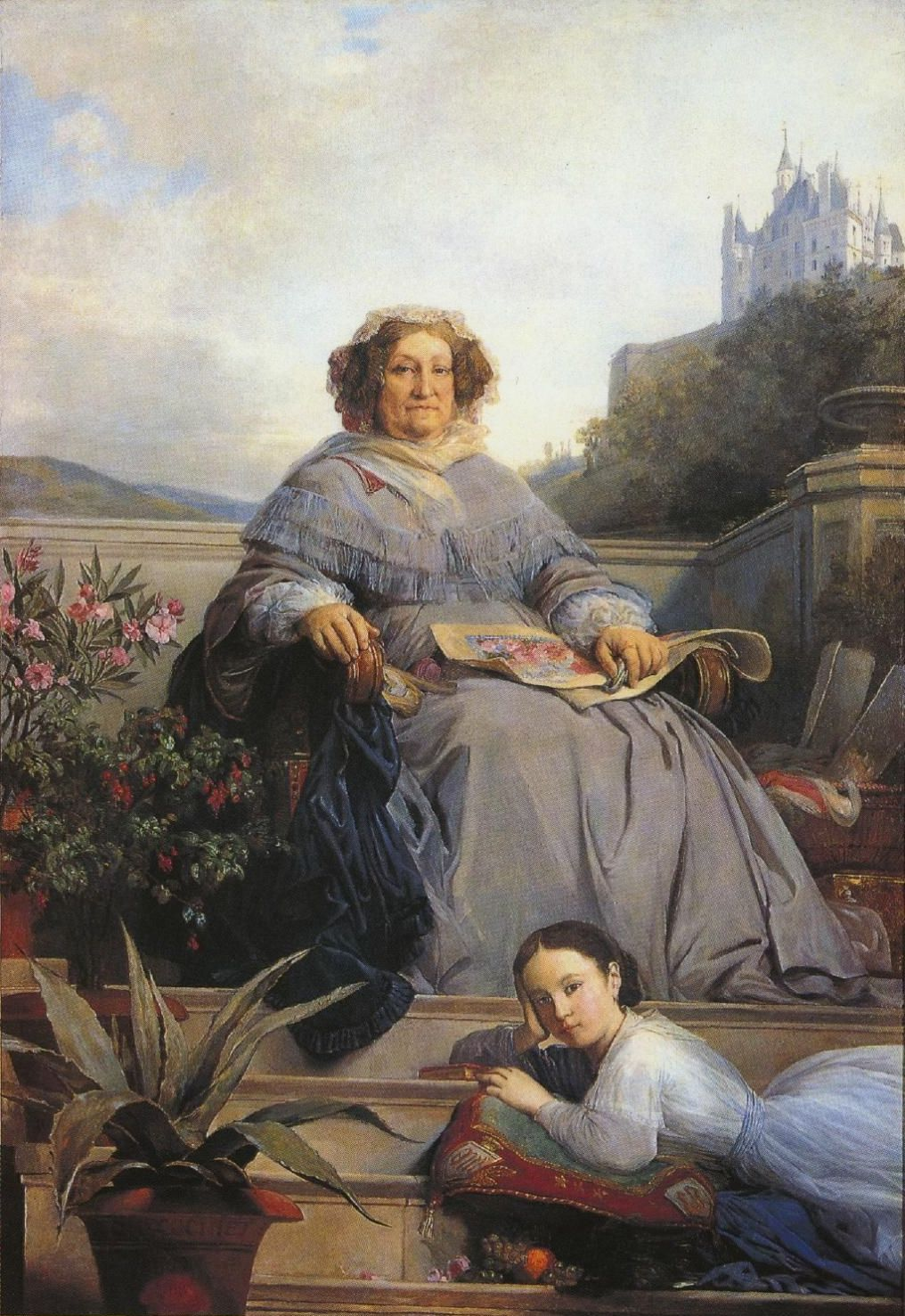
Portrait of Madame Clicquot and her great-granddaughter Anne de Rochechouart-Mortemart by Léon Cogniet.

Barbe-Nicole Ponsardin was born in 1777, in the decade before the French Revolution. Her childhood was influenced by her father, Baron Nicolas Ponsardin, a successful textile maker, who was involved in both business and politics. Formerly a royalist, he switched political positions to turn against the monarchy. Thanks to this move, Barbe-Nicole's family escaped the Revolution unscathed.

When Barbe-Nicole married François Clicquot, she was 21 years old. When her husband died in October 1805, she was 27 and mother of their six-year-old daughter and only child, Clémentine.

In the early 19th century, the Napoleonic Code denied women civil and political rights, prohibiting them from working, voting, earning money, or entering schools and universities without the consent of their husband or father. At that time, widows were the only women in French society to be free and to be allowed to run their own business.

When Louis Bohne came back to Reims from Saint Petersburg, one month after François Clicquot's funeral, 110,000 bottles of champagne had been shipped during the course of 1805, nearly double the preceding year, thanks to his business trips. The Clicquot champagne business was promising.

Against expectations and considerable opposition, the widow Clicquot wanted to take over her husband's business. She went to her father-in-law with a proposal and convinced him to let her manage the business. Philippe agreed to her proposal under one condition: Barbe-Nicole would go through an apprenticeship, after which she would be able to run the business herself, if she could prove that she was capable. Barbe-Nicole Clicquot overcame convention to become the first woman to take over a champagne house and the first female champagne producer. She entered into an apprenticeship with the winemaker Alexandre Fourneaux, and tried to save the wine business and make it grow.

=== The House Veuve Clicquot Ponsardin ===
On 21 July 1810, Barbe-Nicole Ponsardin launched her own company: "Veuve Clicquot-Ponsardin".

Barbe-Nicole exported the vast majority of her champagne out of France. Unfortunately, she was facing naval blockades that kept her from sending her wine abroad. Furthermore, Russian Tsar Alexander I issued a decree banning French products, cutting off a previously lucrative market.

Facing bankruptcy, Barbe-Nicole took a business gamble: she decided to send her champagne to Russia, when peace returned, ahead of her competitors. While the war's naval blockades paralyzed commercial shipping, Madame Clicquot and Louis Bohne secretly planned to sneak a boat through the blockade to Russia.

Russians used to love the kind of champagne she was making: a very sweet champagne that contained about double the amount of sugar in today's sweet dessert wines. She knew that European courts would celebrate the defeat of Napoleon as soon as his wars ended. After Napoleon Bonaparte had been sent into exile on Elba, both British and Russians toasted his defeat.

With the French monarchy restored, Madame Clicquot and Louis Bohne put the plan they had been preparing for five years into execution. In 1814, as the blockades fell away, the company chartered a Dutch cargo ship, the "Zes Gebroeders", en route to Königsberg, to deliver 10,550 bottles of Veuve Clicquot champagne to the Russian market, taking advantage of the general chaos, while their competitors still believed such a move to be impossible. The boat left Le Havre on 6 June 1814. Meanwhile, Russia had lifted the ban on importing French products. The whole shipment was quickly sold. A few weeks later, another ship left Rouen laden with 12,780 bottles of champagne destined for St. Petersburg, which were sold out as soon as they arrived. When the champagne reached St.Petersburg, Grand Duke Michael Pavlovich of Russia, Tsar Alexander I's brother, declared that Veuve Clicquot-Ponsardin champagne would be the only kind he would drink. Word of his preference spread throughout the Russian court.

1814 was a turning point in the history of the Veuve Clicquot company. With her "Vin de la comète" (comet vintages), Madame Clicquot reinvigorated her business which began to take off again, thanks to the success of the Russian venture that made the name Veuve Clicquot famous overnight. She went from being a minor player to a brand name that was known to all. During the years that followed, Russia continued to buy Veuve Clicquot wines. Sales rocketed: from 43,000 bottles in 1816, they climbed to 280,000 in 1821 and increased until the 1870s. Within two years, the widow Clicquot had become famous and was at the helm of an internationally renowned commercial business.

Under Madame Clicquot's guidance, the firm focused entirely on the last, to great success.

Champagne also became a vehicle for celebrating events. Veuve Clicquot played an important role in establishing champagne as a preferred drink of high society. Champagne became an essential ingredient for festivities in European courts, and then amongst the bourgeoisie. Champagne then began turning up, in cabarets and restaurants.

=== Death of Madame Clicquot ===
Sales of Veuve Clicquot champagne in Russia continued to progress. Madame Clicquot decided to establish herself in other markets, such as United Kingdom. Edouard Werlé, who joined the company, started to make a whole series of trips through Central Europe. From 1841 on, when Edouard Werlé officially became head of the company, annual sales never dropped below 300,000 bottles. In 1850, it sold 400,000 bottles.

Edouard and his son Alfred ran the business in the following years developing it further: they acquired new vineyards and in 1877 began utilizing a yellow label for the wines, an unusual color for champagne at the time. They registered the label under the trademark "Veuve Clicquot Ponsardin" Yellow Label.

While the company was pursuing its expansion, Madame Clicquot died at the Château de Boursault on 29 July 1866, at the age of 88.

Madame Clicquot is considered one of the world's first international businesswomen. She brought her wine business back from the brink of destruction turning it into one of the most successful champagne houses. She also spread champagne across the globe.

When she died, sales had reached 750,000 bottles a year. Veuve Clicquot was exporting champagne from France to all Europe, the United States, Asia and elsewhere. Veuve Clicquot had become both a substantial Champagne house and a respected brand. Easily recognised by its distinctive bright yellow labels, the wine held a royal warrant from Queen Elizabeth II of the United Kingdom.

Because she built her champagne empire on audacious decisions, Madame Clicquot was called by her peers "la grande dame de la Champagne". Newspapers all over the world paid tribute to her.

By the terms of an agreement made earlier, Edouard Werlé was already her official successor appointed by Madame Clicquot herself, and in August 1866, a new company was formed: "Werlé & Cie, successors to Veuve Clicquot-Ponsardin".

Bertrand de Mun, who married Edouard Werlé's granddaughter, joined the company in July 1898 and became a partner in 1902. In 1911, under de Mun's direction the house of Veuve Clicquot achieved the sales figure of 2,000,000 bottles. The company was slowed down by the 1914–1918 war.

=== WW1 and WW2 ===
During World War I, the Veuve Clicquot cellars sheltered over one thousand company staff and civilians in the war-torn champagne region from bombardments. Cellars housed a hospital and a chapel. Even short plays were put on in these premises. Today Red Cross signs on the damp chalk walls still indicate the infirmary and shelter area.

After World War I, reconstruction began. All the buildings had been heavily damaged. Gradually everything was rebuilt.

In 1932, Bertrand de Mun was joined by his son-in-law Bertrand de Vogüé. Long before the law required it, they offered benefits to their employees: holidays, pensions, healthcare, sports fields and recreation areas. As a result, the company never suffered stoppage during the strikes that hit France in 1936.

In 1963, the company became a "société anonyme" or joint stock corporation. Bertrand de Vogüé was made chairman, a post to which his son Alain succeeded in 1972.

In 1987, the Louis Vuitton Moët Hennessy group acquired Veuve Clicquot, where it remains today, headed up by Jean-Marc Gallot.

=== Shipwrecked bottles ===
In 1987, an expedition, licensed by the Michigan Department of State and the Michigan Department of Natural Resources and headed by underwater archaeologist E. Lee Spence, recovered a number of cases of Veuve Clicquot (Yellow Label, Dry) Champagne from the 9 November 1913 shipwreck of the Canadian steamer Regina in Lake Huron, off Port Sanilac, Michigan. Spence afterwards described the still sparkling Champagne as "quite dark in color but as having an excellent taste." The shipwreck site is located in approximately 83 feet of water at latitude 43°20.24′ North, longitude 82°26.76′ West. The water temperatures at the wreck site range from 1–18 °C (35–65 °F).

In July 2010, a group of Finnish divers found 168 bottles of champagne beneath the Baltic Sea off the coast of Åland. Bottles were sent back to France for analysis. Ninety-nine of them were identified as Juglar, forty-six as Veuve Clicquot, and at least four as Heidsieck.

When the wine was tasted in 2015, several of them were still drinkable, well-preserved thanks to the cold and dark conditions at the depth.

Chemical analysis showed levels of sugar (150 g/L) much higher than modern champagne (more than most Sauternes), compared to today's champagnes which are generally between 6 and 10g per litre. This high sugar content was characteristic of people's tastes at the time, especially the Russian market known for its preference for sweeter wines.

It also had much higher levels of salt, iron, lead, copper, and arsenic compared with modern vintages. It is believed the arsenic and copper originated from antiquated pesticide (Bordeaux mixture) applied to the grapes. The iron probably came from nails used in the wine barrels, and the lead leached from brass valve fittings of the winemaking equipment. Modern champagne producers begin with wine from stainless steel barrels, yielding lower iron and lead levels.

On 17 November 2010, the local government of Åland announced that most of the bottles were to be auctioned off. A bottle of nearly 200-year-old Veuve Clicquot broke the record for the most expensive champagne ever sold. In 2011, a bidder paid €30,000 for one of them found in the Baltic Sea.

As a result, in 2014, the house submerged 300 bottles and 50 magnums of its champagne at the exact location of the wreck to study whether it matures differently than on land. It will be resurfaced in 40 years and compared with another set of champagne aged underground at the same depth.

=== Oldest bottle ===
In July 2008, an unopened bottle of Veuve Clicquot was discovered inside a sideboard in Torosay Castle, Isle of Mull, Scotland. The 1893 bottle was in mint condition, having been kept in the dark. It is now on display at the Veuve Clicquot Ponsardin visitor centre in Reims and is regarded as priceless. It is the oldest bottle bearing a yellow label kept in the Veuve Clicquot house collection.

In 2001, Cecile Bonnefond became the first female president of Veuve Clicquot since the widow herself was running the company.

== Wine-making ==
=== Crayères ===
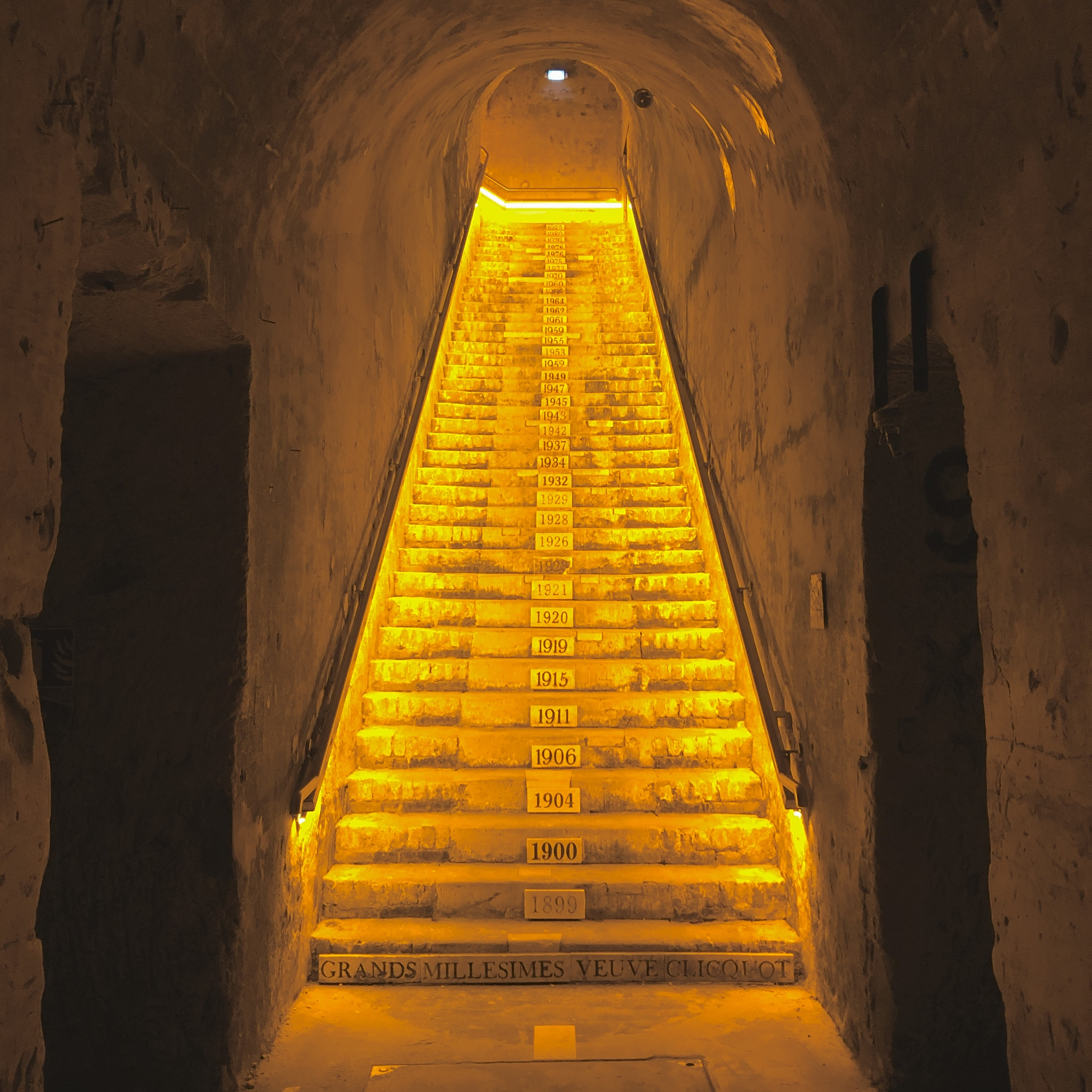
Steps leading up from the Veuve Clicquot cellars, representing grands millesimes (outstanding vintages) in ascending order by year

The oldest parts of the Veuve Clicquot cellars (the "crayères") were originally chalk-pits (chalk quarries). The Veuve Clicquot "crayères" are medieval and lie about 55–65 feet underground. Placed end-to-end, they would extend over more than 12 miles. The chalk walls ensure constant temperature (about 48 °F) and humidity for aging wine. At the beginning of the 20th century the house commissioned artist André Navlet to design reliefs on the cellar walls.

The Veuve Clicquot chalk quarries are located beneath the colline Saint Nicaise and are granted UNESCO World Heritage Site status.

=== Vineyards ===
The first vineyards were owned by Philippe Clicquot near Verzy and Vernezay. The second group of vineyards was the "Bouzy holding" inherited by François Clicquot from his grandmother Muiron in 1804. These two vineyards were enlarged by purchases made by Madame Clicquot. She thus became proprietor of 99 acres (40 ha) of high-quality vines around Bouzy, Vernezay and Verzy.

When establishing her own vineyards, she bought only vines on land that would subsequently be classified 100% on the "échelle des crus" (Bouzy, Verzenay and Verzy). When asked about the quality of her wines, she answered: "we have only one quality, the finest". This remains the company's motto.

When Madame Clicquot took the reins of the company, she spent as much time as possible in the vineyards. Although she was head of the company, she was devoted to the craft of wine making.

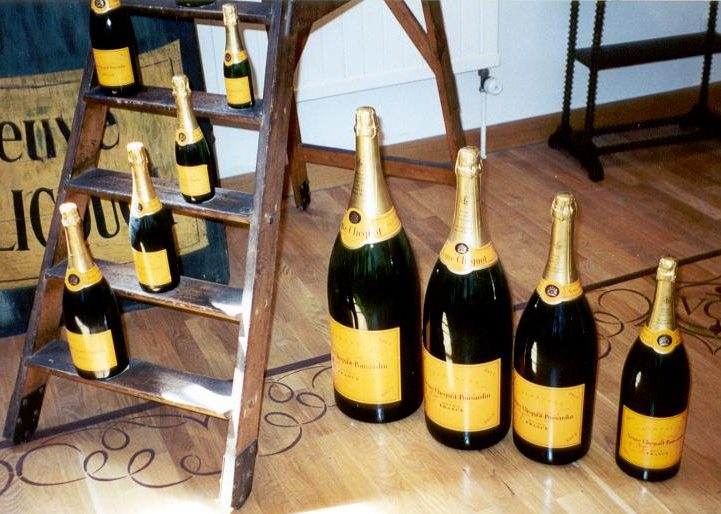
Bottles of Veuve Clicquot ranging in size from "balthazar" (12 L) down to "piccolo" (0.188 L)

Between 1872 and 1873, Alfred Werlé acquired 99 acres (40 ha) at Le Mesnil and enlarged the Bouzy vineyards by 30 acres (12 ha). In a single year, he doubled the vineyard holdings that the company had amassed over a century. Alfred stepped up his acquisition program in 1884, buying a total of 123 acres (50 ha). He also bought Duchesse d'Uzès's vineyards to return the vines she had inherited from Madame Clicquot into the company's ownership.

The policy of extending the Veuve Clicquot vineyards was pursued by Bertrand de Mum. The last acquisitions were 61 acres at Saint-Thierry, purchased between 1967 and 1975.

The house now owns 971 acres (393 ha) of vineyards, with an average rating of 71% on the "échelle des crus". Fifty-five percent of Veuve Clicquot's vineyards are categorized as Grand Cru and 40% are Premier Cru. The vineyard is planted with 50% Chardonnay, 45% Pinot Noir and 5% Meunier.

The company also purchases grapes from 400 different suppliers, some of whom are descendants of the wine growers who sold their harvests to Edouard Werlé.

=== Innovation ===
The natural sparkle is created by the sugar and yeast present in the grape. The interaction between these two elements creates carbon dioxide with varying quantities of bubbles. In the 19th century, neither sugar nor yeast was added to the finished blend to trigger a second fermentation. There was only one fermentation, and not two, as is practiced in modern champagne making. The result was an unpredictable sparkle, with fermentation sometimes continuing even after the wine had been shipped.

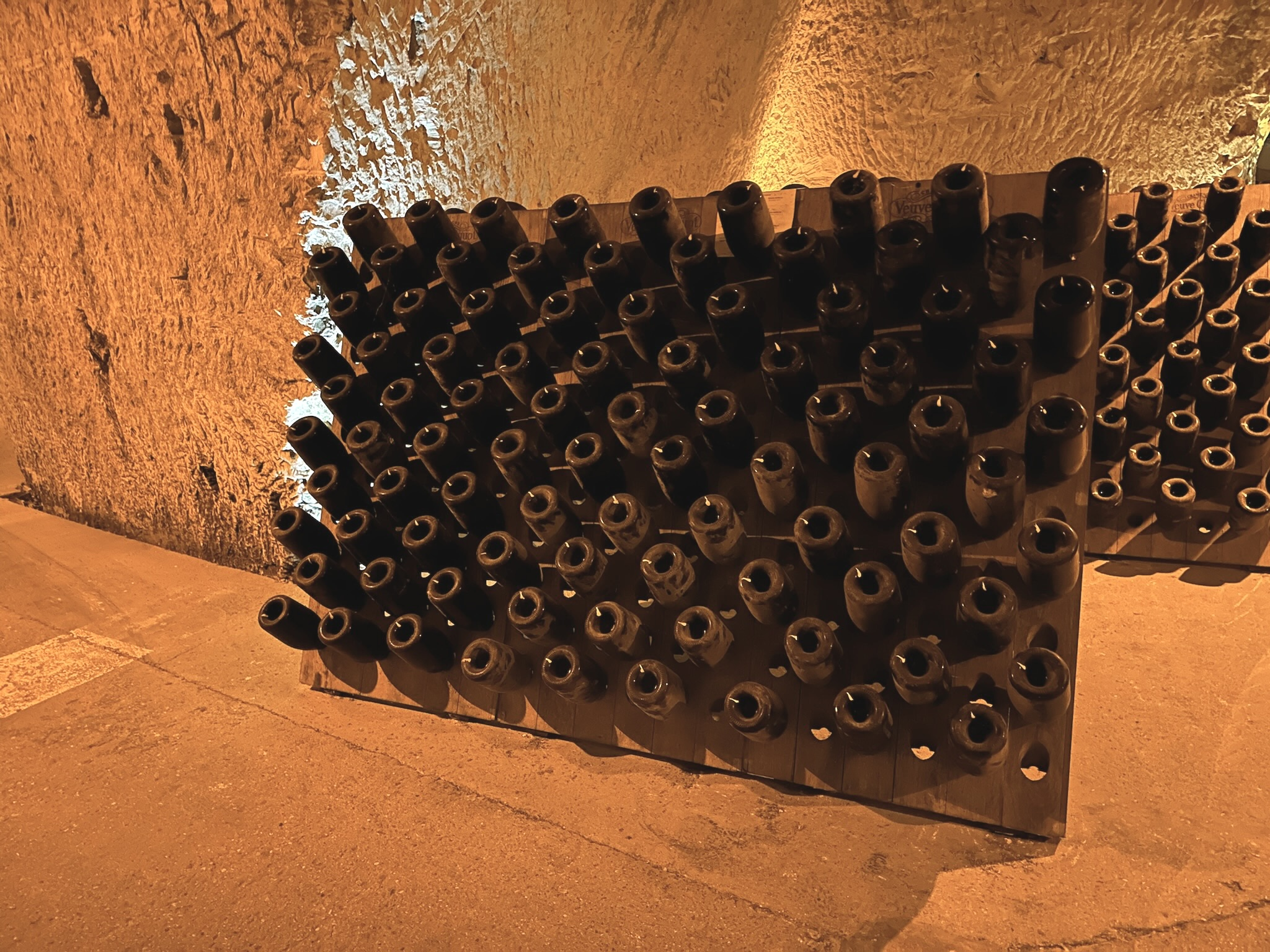
Riddling racks in the Veuve Clicquot chalk cellars

The yeast dies after digesting all the sugar, leaving sediments in the bottle and making the wine look cloudy. To clarify it, champagne producers traditionally poured the wine from one bottle to another. However, this process was time-consuming and wasteful as it damaged the wine through the constant agitation.

Madame Clicquot studied this issue to find a solution. She is credited with a great breakthrough in champagne handling that made mass production of the wine possible.

Assisted by her cellar master Antoine de Müller, she invented the riddling table ("remuage") in 1816. This technique makes it possible to transform the champagne from a cloudy state to crystal clarity.

Instead of transferring the wine from bottle to bottle, she kept the wine in the same bottle but agitated it gently. The bottles were turned upside down, causing the yeast to collect in the neck.

Composed much like a wooden desk with circular holes, the rack allowed a bottle of wine to be stuck sur point or upside down. For six to eight weeks, a cellar assistant would gently shake and twist the bottles (remuage), rotating them by a quarter-turn every day, to bring the sediments into the neck through gradual inversion. When this was completed, the cork was carefully removed, the lees extracted and a liqueur (a mixture of still wine and sugar) was added. This technique was perfected to produce a crystal-clear champagne. These methods are still used today, with a few minor improvements.

The riddling rack rendered the dégorgement process both more efficient and economic. Not only did the quality of her champagne improve, but Veuve Clicquot was able to produce it faster, exporting it around the world in large quantities. This was a crucial advantage over her competitors.

Veuve Clicquot is also credited with producing the first known blended rosé champagne in 1818. Ruinart was the first champagne house to sell rosé, tinting champagne with elderberry juice, in 1764. Barbe-Nicole produced rosé champagne by adding still red wine to its sparkling wine. Today, rosé champagne is made by adding pinot noir. This method is still used today to produce rosé champagne.

=== Process ===
Different varieties of grapes are picked by hand. Every precaution is taken to ensure the grapes remain intact until pressing. After pressing, the juice is put into fermentation vats. The first fermentation takes place for eight days. Then comes the art of blending. Still white wines are combined with reserve wines.

When the finished blend is ready, selected yeasts and sugar are added to increase the final alcohol content. This is the second fermentation. The bottles are placed in a cool cellar to ferment slowly to produce alcohol and carbon dioxide, which produces the bubbles. This usually takes four to six weeks. Veuve Clicquot champagnes are aged longer than required by law. They are cellared for at least 30 months, with the brand's vintage champagnes being aged for five to ten years.

During the riddling process, lees deposit in the neck of the bottle. They are removed during the step of disgorgement. The neck of the bottle is plunged into a refrigerating solution. The sediment is then ejected under pressure when the bottle is opened, with minimum loss of wine and pressure. A mixture of wine, brandy and sugar is added to adjust the sweetness of the wine, making it dry, sweet, etc. The bottles are finally corked, labelled, packed and shipped.

The company was awarded sustainability certification in 2014.

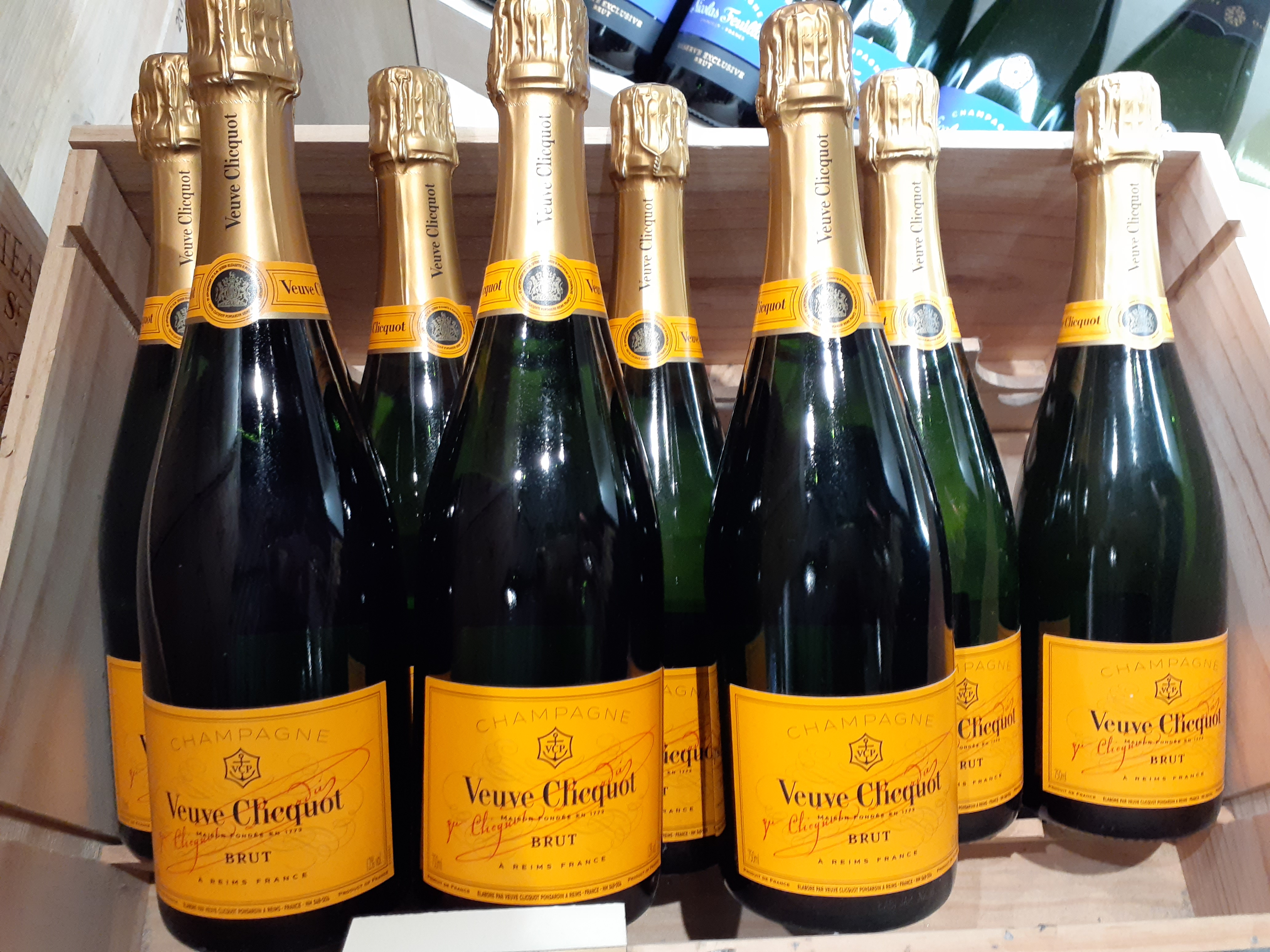
Bottles of Veuve Clicquot Yellow Label Brut at a Hong Kong wine shop

Two hundred years after its creation, the house launched its "La Grande Dame" cuvée in 1972. It is produced from the company's finest Grand Cru vineyards, using two varieties of pinot noir and chardonnay. In 2008, cellar master Dominique Demarville decided to switch from a blend of 60% pinot noir and 40% chardonnay to nearly 100% pinot noir. Veuve Clicquot Yellow Label is a blend of between 50 and 60 different crus, made of pinot noir (50%), meunier (20%) and chardonnay (30%). This champagne is aged for 36 months.

"Rich" champagne was released in June 2015. At the end of its three years of aging, 60g of sugar are added to give it a very sweet taste. In 2017, Veuve Clicquot released its first ultra-dry champagne, the non-vintage "Extra Brut Extra Old" cuvée. This champagne has a low-sugar dosage, is double-aged and blended exclusively from the house's reserve wines of six different vintages.

== Management ==
- Chairman: Jean-Marc Gallot
- Cellar Master: Didier Mariotti

== Communication ==
=== Logo ===
When Philippe Clicquot began producing champagne, he simply sold "champagne wine". There were no labels on the bottles.

The earliest brand he used dates from 1798. It bears the initials "C.M. & F." as "Clicquot-Muiron et Fils". The initials were set within a design of a marine anchor, as a universal symbol of hope, engraved on the cork. His bottles were sealed with green wax, flecked with gold. This green wax was the sole means by which bottles could be recognized by customers.

In 1814, Louis Bohne asked Madame Clicquot to "have a pretty ornamental design printed". This was probably one of the first labels used for champagne.

The green bottle sealing wax was gradually replaced by foil or tinsel wrapped round the cork. In 1895, it was covered with an additional plain, varnished or polished metal cage, bearing the anchor logo and the initials V.C.P. In 1899, white or yellow paper band, depending on the quality of the wine, was added to the neck of the bottle. It took its current form four years later, in 1903.

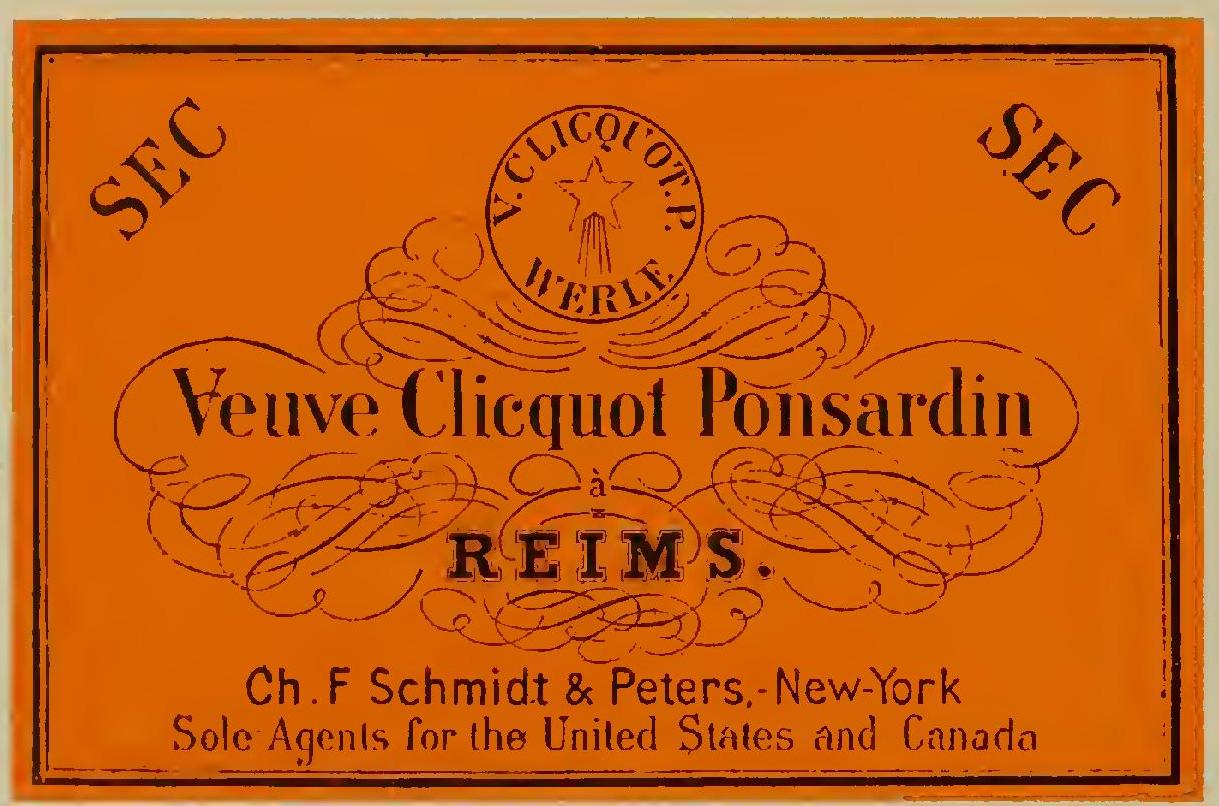
Ad from the 17th annual regatta of the Larchmont Yacht Club, 4 July 1896

=== Yellow label ===
The yellow label began appearing on bottles in 1876. The house pasted a yellow label on its bottles to distinguish dry champagne from sweet on the British market. The color of the label was officially trademarked in 1877 and its use was extended to all bottles. The appearance of the yellow label coincided with growing preference for champagne containing less sugar. In 1897, the yellow label was chosen for "brut" champagne.

== Sponsoring ==
=== Business Woman Award ===
The Veuve Clicquot Business Woman Award was created in France in 1972 on the occasion of the bicentenary of the house's founding. This award honors successful businesswomen around the world. It is the first and the longest-running international prize dedicated to women entrepreneurs. It has recognized some of the most prolific female business leaders and rewards enterprising spirit, courage, determination and innovation. The prize has now expanded to many other countries including, Great Britain, Australia, Switzerland, Sweden, Denmark, the United States, Norway and Japan.

Past winners include Françoise Nyssen, Carolyn McCall, Linda Bennett, Anya Hindmarch, Anita Roddick, Zaha Hadid and Susan Lyons.

The brand also organizes The Veuve Clicquot New Generation Award, recognizing the success of businesswomen between the ages of 25 and 39. This prize acknowledges entrepreneurship, innovation and corporate social responsibility. Mikaela Jade, founder and CEO of Indigital, was in 2018 the latest winner of the Veuve Clicquot New Generation Award.

=== Polo Classic ===
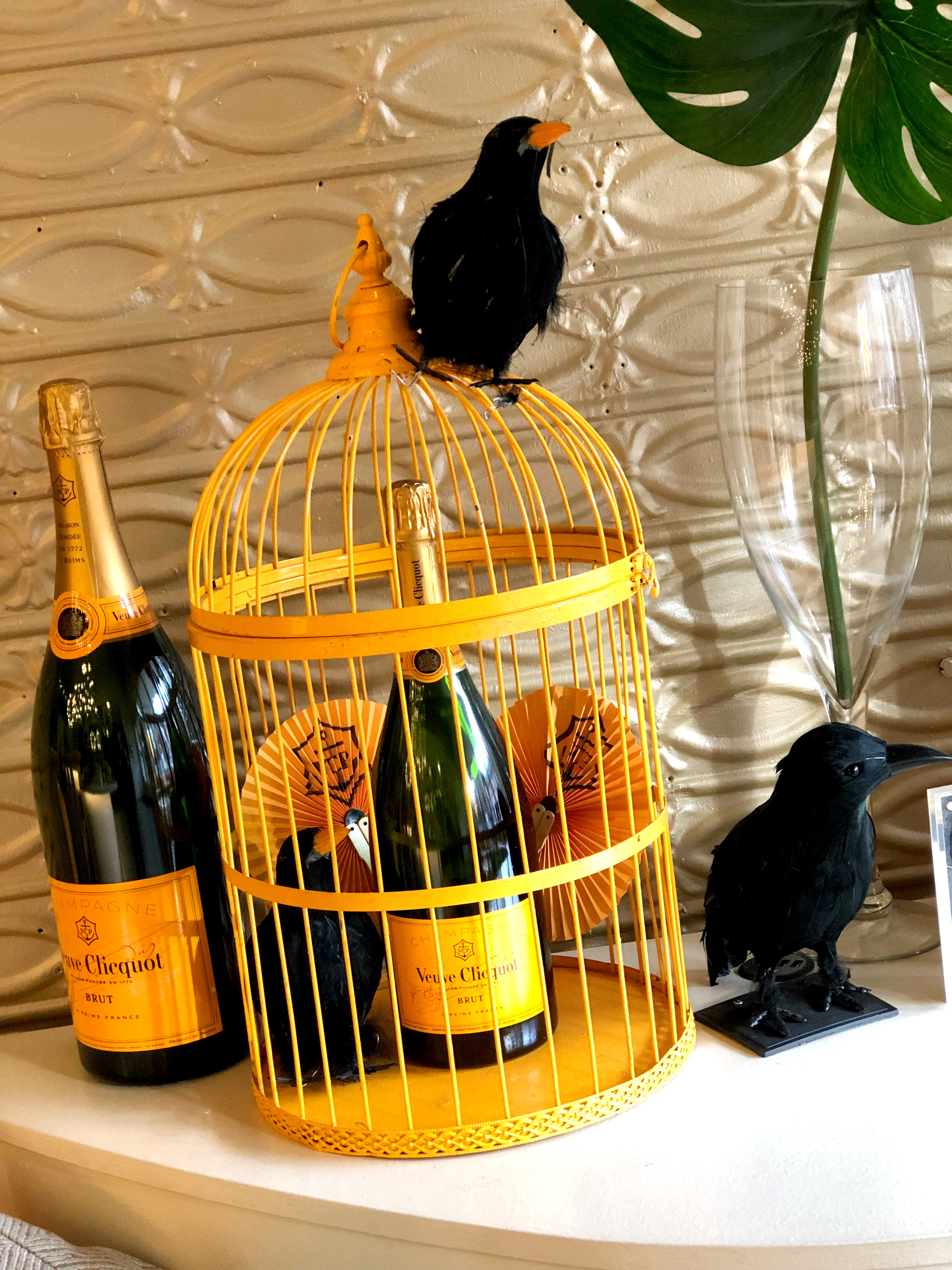
Veuve Clicquot bottles and decorations as part of the company's "Yelloween" celebration

Since 2008, Veuve Clicquot has hosted the Veuve Clicquot Polo Classic at the Liberty State Park near New York and the Will Rogers State Historic Park in Los Angeles each year.

=== Other events ===
Veuve Clicquot organizes various events such as the Veuve Clicquot Widow Series and a couple other events such as Clicquot in the snow and Carnaval, taking place in Miami every year since 2012.

== In popular culture ==
In the decade between 1830 and 1840, the brand was mentioned many times in operettas, vaudeville, variety shows, and reviews.

Many 19th-century Russian novels used the term "klikoskoïe" as a synonym for high-class champagne.

In the 1942 film Casablanca, Captain Renault (played by Claude Rains) recommends Veuve Clicquot to Major Strasser (Conrad Veidt).

In Ian Fleming's novel Casino Royale, the champagne is mentioned twice. The first instance is during his baccarat showdown with Le Chiffre, and the second later in the story when he is accompanying Vesper Lind.

The brand is also mentioned in songs. On his 2010 album Rolling Papers, Wiz Khalifa raps, "I'm sippin' Clicquot and rockin' yellow diamonds" in his song 'Black and Yellow'.

In 2017, fiction podcast The Amelia Project would begin. It heavily features Veuve Clicquot in many episodes, usually during a toast at the end of the episode between the Interviewer and his client in celebration of said client's new life thanks to their services.

In 2023, Haley Bennett portrayed Madame Clicquot in the film Widow Clicquot which premiered at the Toronto Film Festival; it had its wide release on 19 July 2024. The film is "based on Tilar J. Mazzeo's New York Times bestseller The Widow Clicquot: The Story of a Champagne Empire and the Woman Who Ruled It" and focuses on "the true story behind the Veuve Clicquot champagne family and business that began in the late 18th century", although with multiple embellishments.

== See also ==
- Champagne
- List of Champagne houses
- Riddling
- Louis Bohne, sales agent for Veuve Clicquot
