= French woman =

French woman may refer to:

- Women in France
- The French Woman, a 1977 French film
- A French Woman, a 1995 French film

== See also ==
- French Women (film), a 2014 French film
