= Year of the Comet =

1992 romantic comedy adventure film

- Directed by: Peter Yates
- Written by: William Goldman
- Produced by: Nigel Wooll; Peter Yates; Alan Brown; Phil Kellogg
- Starring: Penelope Ann Miller; Tim Daly; Louis Jourdan; Ian Richardson
- Cinematography: Roger Pratt
- Edited by: Ray Lovejoy
- Music by: Hummie Mann
- Production companies: Pinewood Studios; Castle Rock Entertainment; New Line Cinema
- Distributed by: Columbia Pictures
- Release date: April 24, 1992
- Running time: 91 minutes
- Country: United States
- Language: English
- Budget: $18 million
- Box office: $2,791,515

Year of the Comet is a 1992 romantic comedy adventure film directed by Peter Yates and starring Tim Daly, Penelope Ann Miller, and Louis Jourdan in his final film role. The film was written by William Goldman and produced by Alan Brown and Phil Kellogg. The plot concerns the pursuit of the most valuable bottle of wine in history. The title refers to the year it was bottled, 1811, which was known for the Great Comet of 1811, and also as one of the best years in history for European wine.

== Plot ==
Margaret Harwood, the mousy daughter of esteemed wine merchant Sir Mason Harwood, discovers a magnum of wine, vintage 1811, bearing Napoleon's seal. Sir Mason instantly offers it to his best customer, T.T. Kelleher, who sends his friend, Oliver Plexico, to retrieve it. Three other interested parties converge on the valuable rarity: a Greek billionaire, to whom Margaret's unscrupulous brother has independently sold the bottle; an amoral French scientist, who believes the label conceals the secret to a rejuvenation formula that he will kill to obtain; and a murderous thug, who wants to sell it himself.

The bottle changes hands several times as the parties race across Europe from the Scottish Highlands to Èze. In the end, the criminals are defeated, and Margaret and Oliver fall in love. Sir Mason offers the bottle in private auction to both the legitimate "owners", but they are outbid by Oliver, who is revealed as a multimillionaire adventurer scientist. Against advice, Oliver opens the $5 million bottle and freely shares the excellent wine.

== Cast ==
- Timothy Daly as Oliver Plexico
- Penelope Ann Miller as Margaret Harwood
- Louis Jourdan as Philippe
- Ian Richardson as Mason Harwood
- Nick Brimble as Jamie
- Shane Rimmer as T.T. Kelleher
- Timothy Bentinck as Richard Harwood

== Production ==
=== Development ===
William Goldman said he was inspired to write the film by his love of red wine, and a desire to do a romantic adventure comedy thriller in the vein of Charade (1963). He wanted to set it in the most romantic places he knew (London, the Scottish highlands, the French Riviera) which meant it became a chase focusing around a bottle of wine. Goldman created a wine, the most valuable in history, making it a large bottle for dramatic purposes. "It was written out of blind passion," said Goldman, who said the title was a reference to the greatest year in French wine production, the year of the comet, when a comet passed over France.

He wrote the script in 1978, the second of a three-picture deal he had with Joseph E. Levine following A Bridge Too Far. Goldman says he had Glenda Jackson in mind for the female lead, with Cary Grant his inspiration for the male lead (although Levine wanted to use Robert Redford).

The script was not filmed in the late 1970s. When Levine died rights passed to his wife Rosalie. In the late 1980s Goldman wrote two successful films for Castle Rock Productions, The Princess Bride and Misery. At his suggestion, Castle Rock bought the script from Rosalie Levine. It was then known as A Very Good Year.

Goldman said Castle Rock executives were "amazingly script-oriented. You sit with them — that is, Rob Reiner, Andy Scheinman, Marty Shafer — all three of them friends for 15 years. And they go over the (script), line by line, comma by comma. It's amazing to me that they'd be willing to do that. They all have a writer's mind, it's remarkable. Their theory is that they get the script right first, then shoot it."

Goldman suggested Peter Yates direct. The two men were friends, Yates living across the street in New York, and having collaborated on The Hot Rock.

Lead roles went to Penelope Ann Miller, coming off Kindergarten Cop and Timothy Daly, then the star of TV's Wings. "It's a great role," said Daly. "This movie has an old-fashioned feel to it-in the best possible sense. It's almost swashbuckling. My character is the kind of guy I've been dying to play for a long time. He's got a lot of strings-he's tough, resourceful, funny, irreverent, he has a skewed view of things and a few emotional walls that he keeps up."

=== Filming ===
The film was filmed on location in France, Scotland including the ferry chase scene at Kyleakin, and at the Pinewood Studios in Buckinghamshire, England.

"Wine is really the hero of this film," said Peter Yates.

Goldman was on set much of the time. "The locations played a great part in my being here," Goldman said at the time. "But it's for little things-something will happen in the staging that will obviate a line. It's little stuff, but Peter (Yates) likes having a writer around."

Daly wore a mustache in the film:

I thought it was kind of dope. [Laughs.] I mean, it was a little Robert Redford-esque, don’t you think? Or something. I kind of like it. It drove me crazy, though. I was always, like, pulling at it or licking it. But I thought it added a certain—I mean, it either added some panache, or it made me look like a ’70s porn star. Take your pick.

Miller said, "Tim and I have a nice rapport. We banter a lot. We work similarly, and that's only going to enhance the chemistry of the film. It reminds me of those old William Powell and Myrna Loy movies, the way those two worked together."

== Release ==
Goldman says the film previewed poorly, which he attributed to the audience's lack of enthusiasm for red wine. A new opening sequence was added where the male hero says he hates red wine and has to be dragged to a tasting but he says it did not work. "There was nothing we could do because no matter how we fussed this was a movie about red wine and the moviegoing audience today has zero interest in red wine."

The film went on to perform disappointingly at the box office. Tim Daly later recalled:

What a bummer, man. I loved that movie, I loved doing it. It was just a great part for me! And that was my shot, right? That was my shot to be a movie star. I mean, on paper, it was a William Goldman script, Peter Yates directing, it was a Castle Rock production, it had a good budget—and the movie just did not work. But I still think—as I recall, I think I was pretty good in that movie. [Laughs.] I mean, I don’t blame myself for the lack of success. There was also the added novelty that it was released the weekend of the Rodney King riots, where every white person in the United States was locked in their safe room. So I don’t think a lot of folks were traipsing out to the movies. I think it may still hold the record for being the biggest flop in Castle Rock history. A dubious distinction.

=== Critical reaction ===
The film was panned by critics. It currently holds a 0% approval rating on Rotten Tomatoes, based on 13 reviews, with an average rating of 3.7/10.

Dave Kehr of Chicago Tribune said, "The characters are completely undeveloped, the action wholly arbitrary and the continuity non-existent. The picture appears to have been edited with a Cuisinart, with occasional backup from a dull ax." Louis Black of the Austin Chronicle gave it one star out of five, saying, "This one should pretty much sink without a trace, so I hate to even stir the waters by detailing how inept it is."

Rita Kempley of The Washington Post said, "(Screenwriter) Goldman ... just happens to be (director) Yates's neighbor in the south of France. Yates, whose achievements include The Dresser, and Goldman, who is the screenwriter's screenwriter, wanted to make a movie about their three favorite things: the Scottish Highlands, the Riviera and red wine. And that's exactly what they did. The scenery's pretty and one can practically smell cork."

Goldman later called it "an absolutely decent, solidly crafted film."

== See also ==
- Comet vintages
