= Comet vintages =

Years with an astronomical event prior to harvest

«Le vin de la comète» («Comet Wine»), ca. 1818–1819. Lithograph by the French artist and engraver Nicolas-Toussaint Charlet. The scene depicts a shoemaker raising a jug of wine in front of a tavern. Above the door is a comet and part of the name «A LA COM…»

Comet vintages are years during which an astronomical event, involving generally a "Great Comet", occurs prior to harvest. Throughout the history of wine, winemakers have attributed successful vintages and ideal weather conditions to the unexplained effects caused by the comets. Some of the most heralded vintages in the last couple of centuries—such as the 1811, 1826, 1839, 1845, 1852, 1858, 1861, 1985, and 1989 vintages—have coincided with a notable appearance of a comet. There is no scientific basis for any effect of comets on viticulture, but the term nevertheless remains in use.

The term "comet wine" is sometimes used in the wine world to describe a wine of exceptional quality in reference to the high reputation that comet vintages have. The 1811 comet vintage, coinciding with the appearance of the Great Comet of 1811, is perhaps the most famous. The 1811 Château d'Yquem has exhibited what wine experts like Robert Parker have described as exceptional longevity with Parker scoring the wine a perfect 100 points when tasted in 1996. The 1811 vintage of Veuve Clicquot is theorized to have been the first truly "modern" Champagne due to the advancements in the méthode champenoise which Veuve Clicquot pioneered through the technique of remuage.

== Effects of the comets ==
There is no accepted viticultural impact of comets on grapevines, and there have been many successful vintages throughout the world in years where there were no noticeable comet sightings. Over centuries a great number of events and phenomena have been attributed to the appearances of comets in the sky—such as devastating earthquakes, a 1668 epidemic among cats in Westphalia, or an increase in the birth of twins in a particular area. While many of the phenomena associated with comets tend to be negative, the association of comets and wine has almost always been held as beneficial by viticulturists and oenologists.

== 1811 vintage ==
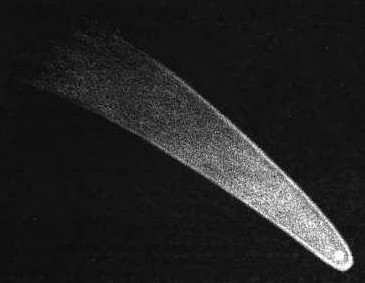
The Great Comet of 1811, as drawn by William Henry Smyth

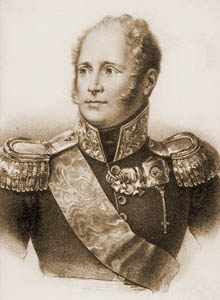
Despite officially banning the importation of bottled French wines, such as Champagne, Tsar Alexander I was said to have sought out the Veuve Clicquot Cuvée de la Comète

The 1811 comet vintage has had the most lasting notoriety. The comet that year was the Flaugergues comet, named after Honoré Flaugergues who first spotted the comet in March. The comet was visible for most of the growing season, which saw optimal conditions for many of the world's major growing regions, but particularly for France. After a string of bad vintages at the start of the 19th century, the 1811 vintage was a reversal of fortune in regions like Bordeaux, Cognac, Champagne and Sauternes. For Cognac, the vintage was considered one of the greatest in history, with many producers today including images of stars on their labels as a homage to the 1811 vintage. Notable wines from this include the 1811 Château d'Yquem, which received a perfect 100-point wine rating by wine critic Robert Parker at a 1996 tasting over one hundred and eighty years after it was bottled. In Germany, the 1811 vintage was so successful that producers along the Rhine would label their wines as "comet hock".

The 1811 bottling of vintage Champagne from the Champagne house of Veuve Clicquot has been theorized to have been the first truly "modern" Champagne. The wine was one of the first to be described as "limpid" or sediment-free. This was due to the new technique of remuage or riddling developed by Veuve Cliquot that tackled the historical problem of how to remove the ill tasting and unpleasant looking sediments from the sparkling wine without losing the carbon-dioxide gas that makes it bubble. The development of riddling was a hallmark moment in the evolution of the modern Champagne industry. In the early 19th century, Veuve Clicquot tried to keep their techniques a secret, but the clarity and limpidity of their Champagne captured worldwide attention and eventually their secret escaped. In the summer of 1812, following Napoleon's invasion of Russia, despite a decree from Tsar Alexander I of Russia banning the importation of French wine in bottles, Louis Bohne, lead sales agent for Veuve Clicquot, was able to smuggle a large quantity of the 1811 Cuvée de la Comète into Königsberg. As word of the wine's quality spread, Bohne found eager customers among the Russian elite, with even the Tsar himself seeking out the wine.

=== Literary references ===
There have been several references in literature to the 1811 vintage, which was often described as the "Year of the Comet". It is referenced in the title of Ray Russell's 1967 short story "Comet Wine", and the vintage contributes to the story's plot. Ernst Jünger's 1939 novel On the Marble Cliffs has central characters drinking wine from the "year of the comet". In "The Adventure of the Stockbroker's Clerk" by Arthur Conan Doyle, Dr. Watson describes Sherlock Holmes, upon being told the clerk's story, as being pleased, "like a connoisseur who has just taken his first sip of a comet vintage." In the 1992 romantic comedy Year of the Comet, a bottle of 1811 Château Lafite is central to the story line. In "The Uncommercial Traveller," Charles Dickens refers to a clergyman as one "acquainted with 'Twenty port and comet vintages". It is referred to in the 1922 short story "Putois" by Anatole France: "Monsieur Blaise, the registrar, who declared that he had employed Putois to chop wood in his yard, from the 19th until the 23rd of October, in the year of the comet."

== Other notable comet vintages ==
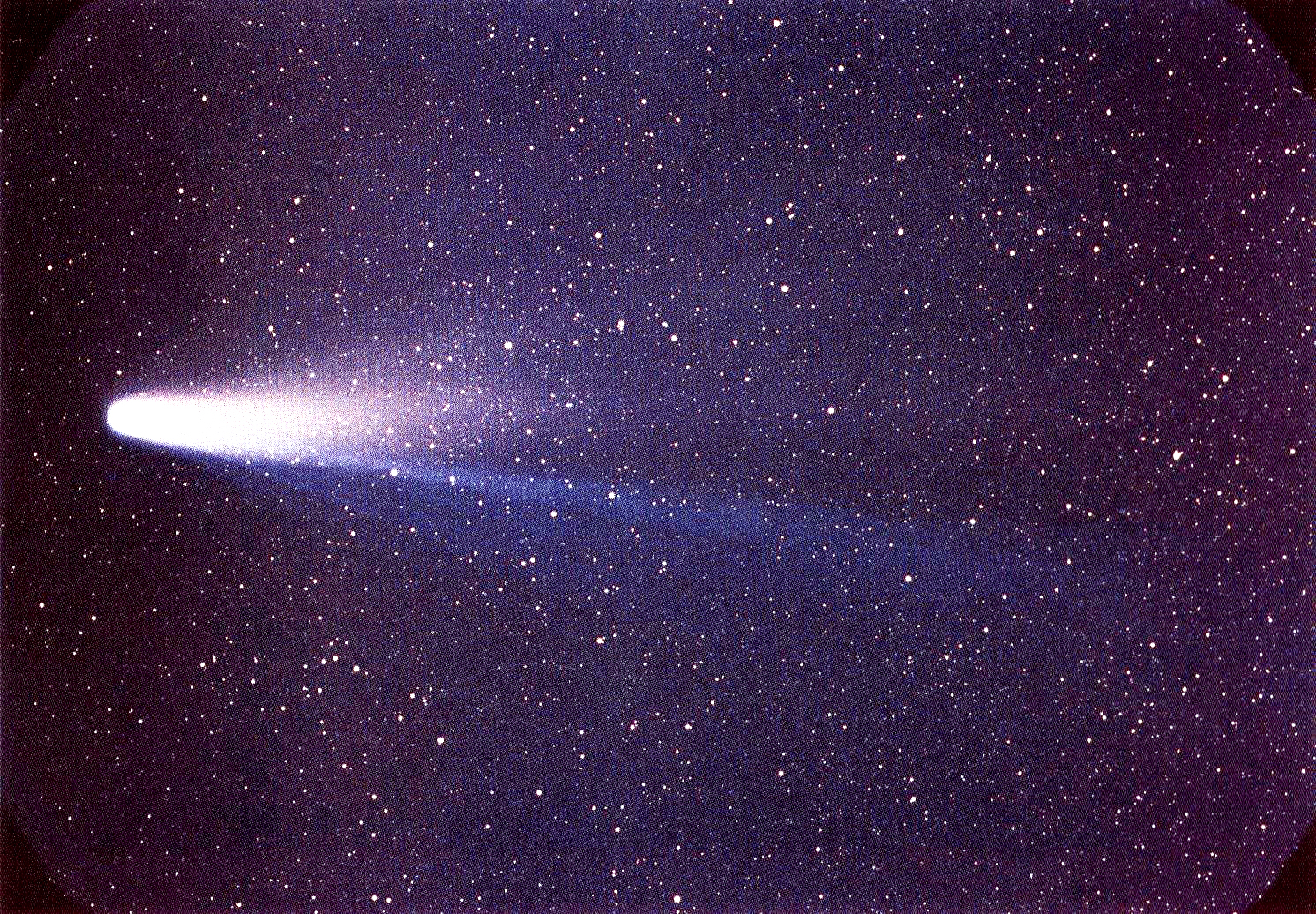
During its 1986 return Halley's Comet was visible in late 1985 which has been called a "comet vintage"

The 1858 comet vintage attributed to the Donati Comet was widely praised for the quality of Bordeaux claret that came out of that vintage. The 1874 comet vintage was considered especially favorable for the German wine regions of the Mosel and Rheingau.

- 1826 — Biela's Comet
- 1832 — Biela's Comet
- 1839 — Biela's Comet
- 1845 — Great June Comet of 1845
- 1846 — Biela's Comet
- 1852 — Biela's Comet
- 1858 — Comet Donati
- 1861 — Great Comet of 1861
- 1874 — Comet Coggia
- 1985 — Halley's Comet
- 1989 — Comet Okazaki-Levy-Rudenko
