= Château de Boursault =

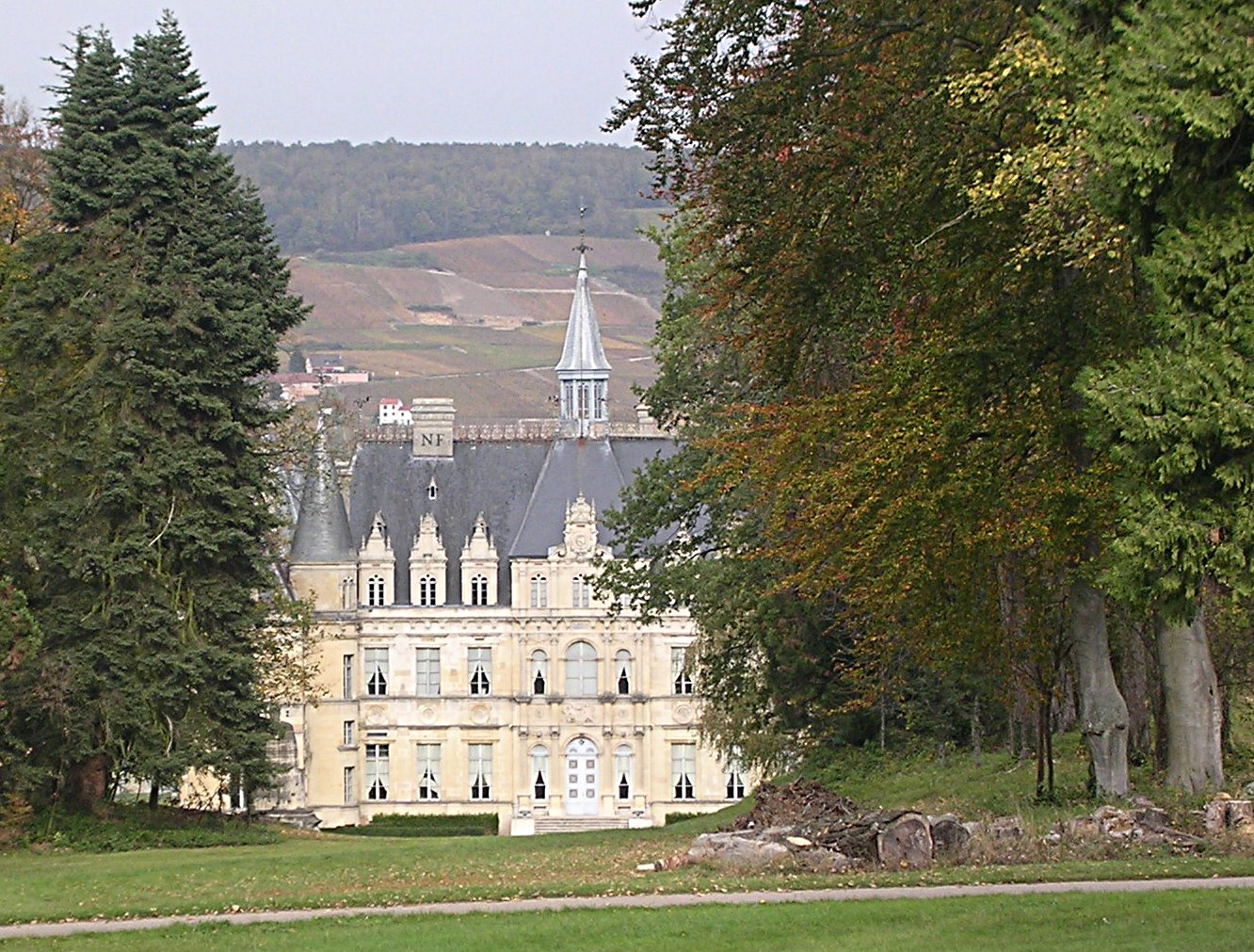

- Location within France

General information
- Type: Château
- Architectural style: Neo-Renaissance
- Location: Boursault, Marne, France
- Coordinates: 49.0638°N 3.85028°E
- Construction started: 1843
- Completed: 1850

Design and construction
- Architect: Arveuf

The Château de Boursault is a neo-Renaissance château in Boursault, Marne, France. It was built between 1843 and 1850 by Madame Clicquot Ponsardin, the Veuve Clicquot (Widow Clicquot) who owned the Veuve Clicquot champagne house. It was sold by her heir to the Berry family of Canada from 1913 to 1927 and was used as a military hospital in both the first and second world wars. Today the Château de Boursault brand of champagne is made from grapes grown in the vineyards around the château and is aged in its cellars. In 1927, the estate was acquired by Achod Fringhian, whose family has managed the estate for generations.

== History ==
There are records of the seigneurie de Boursault from the 14th century, when Robert de Flandre, seigneur de Brugny, ceded the land to Geoffroy de Naast. It seems to have been returned, and given to the daughter of Robert de Flandre, who married Henry IV, Count of Bar (c. 1315–1344).

In 1409, Cardinal Louis de Bar (c. 1375–1430) was given Boursault and other seigneuries by his father, Robert, Duke of Bar (1344–1411).

The old fortress château of the barons of Boursault dated to the 16th century. The surrounding area was covered in vineyards from that time, apart from an interval of one century when it was wooded. By the early 19th century, the medieval château was very dilapidated.

The present Château de Boursault was built by Madame Clicquot Ponsardin (1777–1866), founder of the Veuve Clicquot Champagne house, in honor of the marriage of her granddaughter Marie Clémentine de Chevigné to Louis de Mortemard-Rochechouard in 1839. It replaced the old château of the barons of Boursault. Construction began in 1843 and was completed in 1850. Madame Veuve Clicquot retired to the château at the age of 64 and died there when she was 89.

Anne de Rochechouart de Mortemart (1847–1933), Duchess of Uzès, inherited the château on Madame Clicquot's death in 1866. She was the daughter of Marie Clémentine and Louis. The Duchess sold the property in 1913. It was used as a military hospital in World War I (1914–18) and again during World War II (1939–45). The park was converted to vineyards for production of champagne.

The "Château de Boursault" brand of champagne continues to be made in the chateau and aged in its cellars. It is the only champagne with the "château" denomination in Marne.

== Building ==
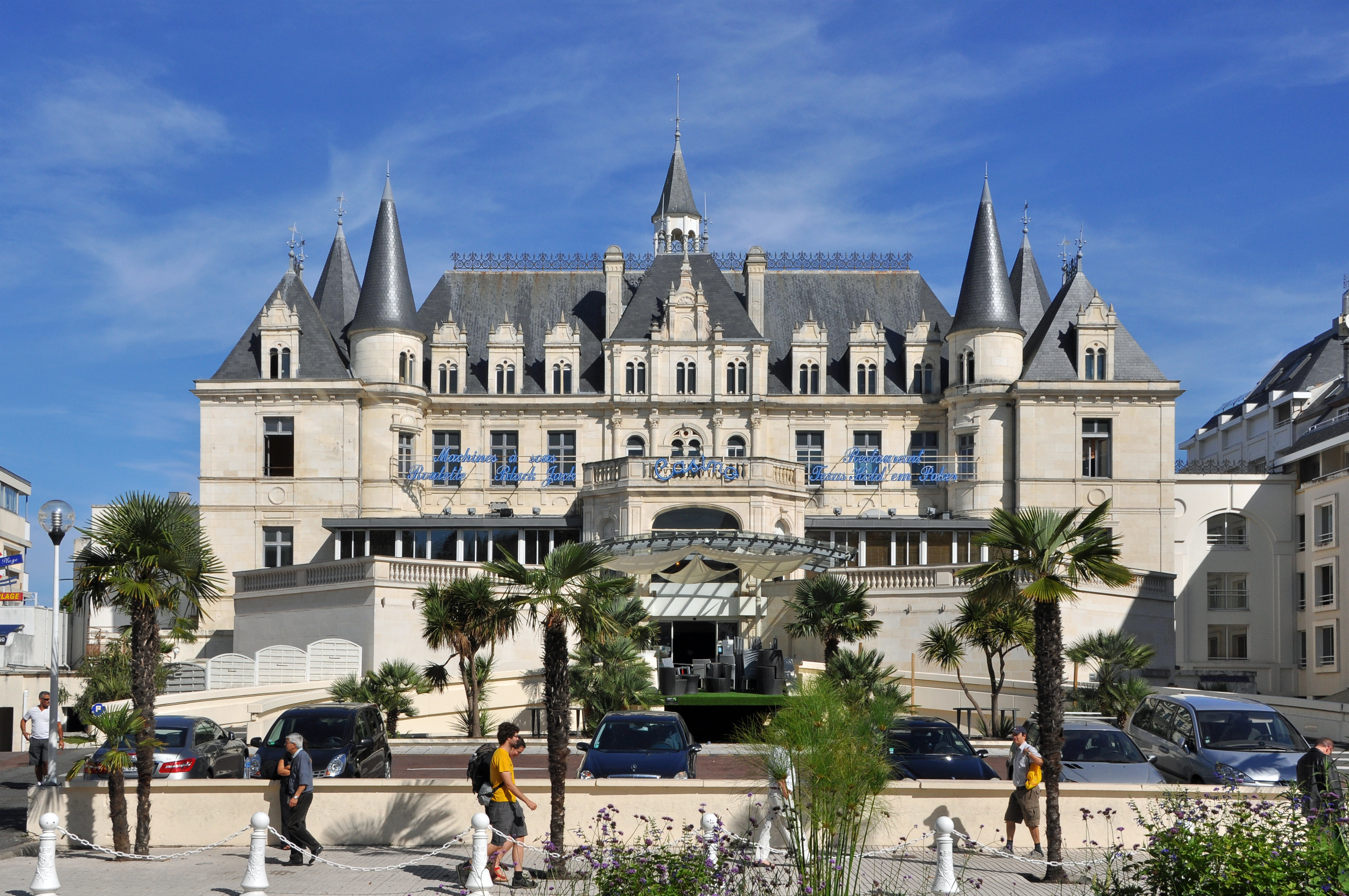
The Casino of Arcachon (pictured) is an exact replica of Château de Boursault.

The château was built by the architect Jean-Jacques Arveuf-Fransquin (1802–76). It was located on the wooded summit of a hill planted with vines, and dominates the surrounding countryside and the village of Boursault. It was set in a magnificent park covering 11 hectares (27 acres).

The château was designed in a Neo-Renaissance style, to be used for formal receptions. It has monumental architecture with a high roof and heavily decorated windows. It resembles the Château de Chambord, but has many more fireplaces. An 1882 description said, "This beautiful residence contains all the riches of modern art, and attests to the generous and intelligent efforts of the princes of finance and industry to maintain the national taste at the level of its ancient traditions."

The Château Deganne on the sea front in Arcachon was built in 1853 by Adalbert Deganne. From the exterior, this building, now the Casino de la Plage, is an exact replica of the Château de Boursault.

== Sources ==
- "1850 - Château de Boursault construit par Madame Veuve Clicquot". Grandes Marques & Maisons de Champagne. UMC.
- Almanach de Gotha. Justus Perthes. 1891.
- Auzias, Dominique; Labourdette, Jean-Paul (2010). Petit Futé Champagne-Ardenne. Petit Futé. ISBN 978-2-7469-2884-8.
- Auzias, Dominique; Labourdette, Jean-Paul (2012-06-19). Bassin d'Arcachon 2012 (avec cartes, photos + avis des lecteurs). Petit Futé. ISBN 978-2-7469-5432-8.
- Champollion-Figeac, J.J. (1841). Documents historiques inédits: tirés des collections manuscrites de la Bibliothèque royale et des archives ou des bibliothèques des départements. F. Didot. p. 353.
- "Histoire du Château". Champagne Château de Boursault.
- Joanne, Adolphe (1868). Itinéraire général de la France: Vosges et Ardennes. L. Hachette. p. 17.
- "La Duchesse D'Uzès". Nemausensis.
- Lami, Eugène-Oscar (1882). Dictionnaire encyclopédique et biographique de l'industrie et des arts industriels. Librairie des dictionnaires.
- Legrand, Francis; Lebourcq, Sébastien; Meyer, Laetitia (2008-04-25). Champagne-Ardenne. Petit Futé. ISBN 978-2-7469-2126-9.
- Millard, A. (1886). "Review: Promenades d'un touriste dans l'arrondissement d'Eperney". Nouvelle revue de Champagne et de Brie. Revue de Champagne et de Brie.
- Petit Futé (2014-04-08). France en avion 2014 Petit Futé (avec photos et avis des lecteurs). Petit Futé. ISBN 978-2-7469-7109-7.
- Williams, Nicola (2010-09-15). France. Lonely Planet. ISBN 978-1-74220-339-3.
