= Susan Lyons (engineer) =

British engineer

Susan Mary Lyons (born September 1952) OBE FREng is a British engineer who was the Managing Director, Defence (Europe) at British aerospace company Rolls-Royce from 1998 to 2001. Lyons has been awarded an OBE for services to aero engineering.

== Education and career ==
Lyons studied Production Engineering and Production Management at the University of Nottingham, graduating in 1975. After graduating, she began working as an engineer at Rolls-Royce, where she initially served until 1986. She then worked at Precision Castparts Corporation for three years, before returning to Rolls Royce. From 1998 to 2001 Lyons held the position of managing director, Defence (Europe). She also held the position of non-executive director of National Express Group, Investis Digital (beginning in 2001) and was a director at several other British aerospace companies.

Lyons retired from her professional career in 2007.

== Recognition ==
In 1997 Lyons was elected a Fellow of the Royal Academy of Engineering and in 1998 was awarded an Order of the British Empire (OBE) for services to aero engineering. Other recognition includes being shortlisted for the 1997 Veuve Clicquot Business Woman of the Year award and winning the 1999 European Woman of Achievement award in the Business category.

Lyons is a visiting professor in Principles of Engineering Design at Imperial College London.
