= Great Comet of 1811 =

Non-periodic comet

C/1811 F1 (Flaugergues) (Great Comet of 1811)
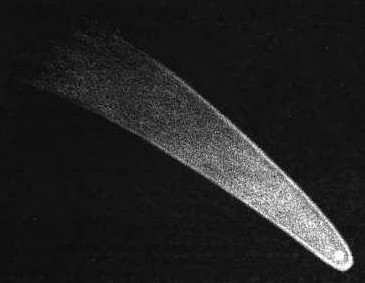
- The Great Comet of 1811, as sketched by William Henry Smyth

Discovery
- Discovered by: Honoré Flaugergues
- Discovery date: March 25, 1811

Designations
- Alternative designations: 1811 I

Orbital characteristics
- Epoch: 1811-Sep-05; 2382760.5
- Observation arc: 505 days (1.38 years)
- Number of observations: 1000
- Orbit type: Long period comet
- Aphelion: 423 AU
- Perihelion: 1.04 AU
- Semi-major axis: 212.4 AU
- Eccentricity: 0.995125
- Orbital period: 2742 years (inbound); 2974 years (outbound)
- Inclination: 106.9°
- Last perihelion: September 12, 1811
- Next perihelion: ≈48th century

Physical characteristics
- Dimensions: 30–40 km (19–25 mi)
- Comet total magnitude (M1): 0.0

The Great Comet of 1811, formally designated C/1811 F1, is a comet that was visible to the naked eye for around 260 days, the longest recorded period of visibility until the appearance of Comet Hale–Bopp in 1997. In October 1811, at its brightest, and when it was 1.2 AU from Earth, it displayed an apparent magnitude of 0, with an easily-visible coma.

== Discovery ==
The comet was discovered on March 25, 1811, by Honoré Flaugergues at 2.7 AU from the Sun in the now-defunct constellation of Argo Navis. After being obscured for several days by moonlight, it was also found by Jean-Louis Pons on April 11, while Franz Xaver, Baron Von Zach was able to confirm Flaugergues' discovery the same night.

The first provisional orbit was computed in June by Johann Karl Burckhardt. Based on those calculations, Heinrich Wilhelm Matthäus Olbers predicted that the comet would go on to become extremely bright later that year.

== Observations ==
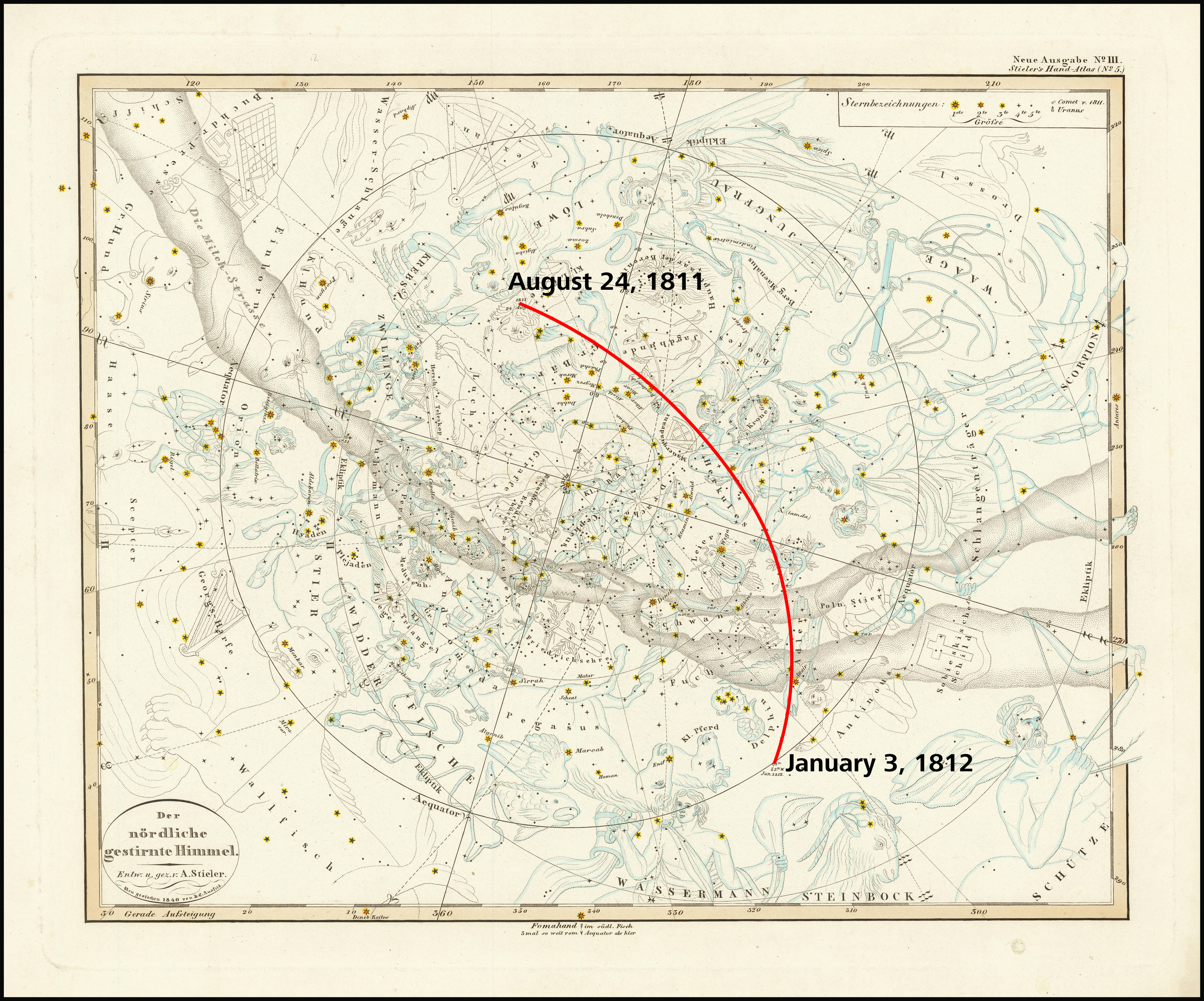
1840 celestial map showing the trajectory of the comet between August 1811 and January 1812

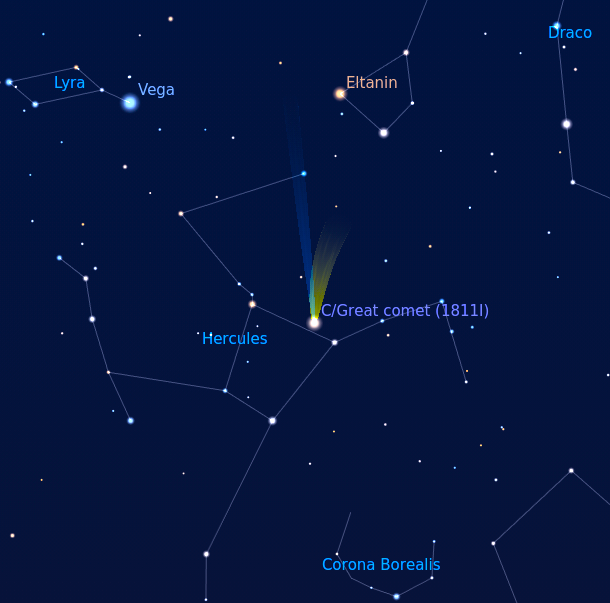
The Great Comet in the constellation Hercules in October 1811 as depicted in Stellarium

Animation of the comet's orbit between May 1811 and March 1812

From May to August, the comet's position made it difficult to spot because of its low altitude and the evening twilight. Both Flaugergues and Olbers were able to recover it in Leo Minor during August, Olbers noting a small but distinct tail, consisting of two rays forming a parabola, when viewing through a comet seeker. In August, the comet was first sighted in the United Kingdom by James Veitch of Inchbonny. By September, in Ursa Major, it was becoming a conspicuous object in the evening sky as it approached perihelion: William Herschel noted that a tail 25° long had developed by October 6.

By January 1812, the comet's brightness had faded. Several astronomers continued to obtain telescopic observations for some months, the last being Vincent Wisniewski at Novocherkassk, who noted it as barely reaching an apparent magnitude of 11 by August 12.

The Great Comet of 1811 was thought to have had an exceptionally large coma, perhaps reaching over 1 million miles across, 50% larger than the Sun. The comet's nucleus was later estimated at 30–40 km in diameter. In many ways, the comet was quite similar to Comet Hale–Bopp; it became spectacular without passing particularly close to either the Earth or the Sun but had an extremely large and active nucleus.

Astronomers also found the comet a memorable sight. William Henry Smyth, comparing his recollections of the Great Comet of 1811 to the spectacular Donati's Comet, stated that "as a mere sight-object, the branched tail was of greater interest, the nucleus with its 'head-veil' was more distinct, and its circumpolarity was a fortunate incident for gazers".

The comet was apparently visible during the New Madrid earthquakes in December 1811. A report on the first steamship to descend the Ohio River as it approached the confluence with the Mississippi River states, "December 18, 1811.—The anniversary of this day the people of Cairo [Illinois] and its vicinity should never forget. It was the coming of the first steamboat to where Cairo now is—the New Orleans, Capt. Roosevelt, Commanding. It was the severest day of the great throes of the New Madrid earthquake; at the same time, a fiery comet was rushing athwart the horizon".

== Return ==
Before perihelion passage on September 12, 1811, the comet had an orbital period of about 2742 years. Computing the barycentric orbital period of the comet after perihelion passage when it is outside the planetary region (using an epoch of 2200) shows an orbital period of about 2974 years, which would give a return year of around 4785.

Barycentric orbital periods when outside planetary perturbations
	Epoch 1600	Epoch 2200
Orbital period	2742 yr	2974 yr
Orbital eccentricity	0.9947	0.9950
Aphelion	391 AU	413 AU

== Allusions in culture ==
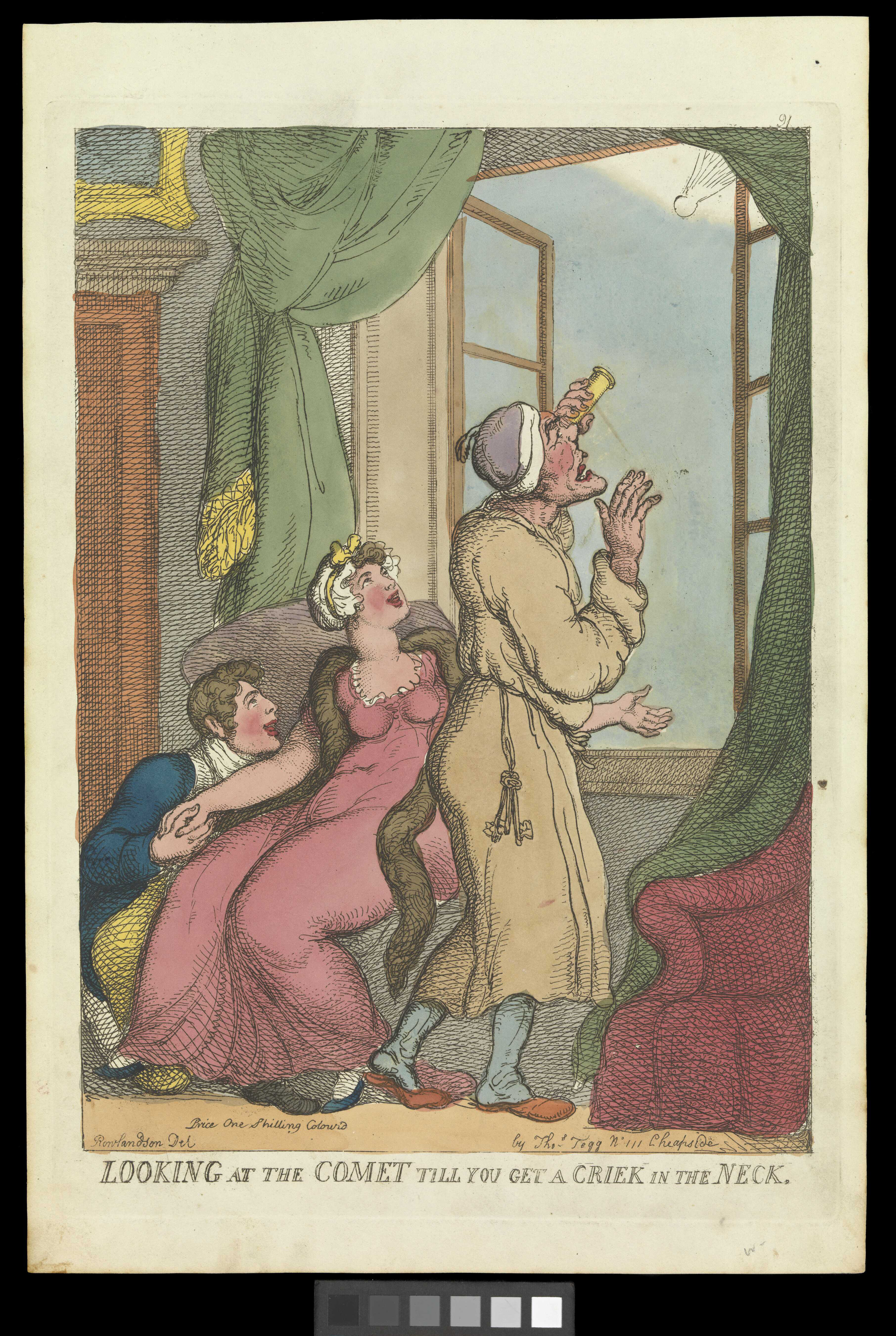
Looking at the comet till you get a criek in the neck, hand-coloured 1811 satirical print by Thomas Rowlandson

The Great Comet of 1811 appears to have had a particularly profound impact on non-astronomers. The artists John Linnell and William Blake both witnessed it and produced several sketches; the latter possibly incorporated in his famous panel The Ghost of a Flea.

The English travel writer, novelist and political economist Harriet Martineau (1802–1876) makes an odd reference to not seeing the comet in her Autobiography: "When the great comet of 1811 was attracting all eyes ... [n]ight after night, the whole family of us went up to the long windows at the top of my father's warehouse; and the exclamations on all hands about the comet perfectly exasperated me,—because I could not see it! ... Such is the fact; and philosophers may make of it what they may,—remembering that I was then nine years old, and with remarkably good eyes."

In China, some leaders of the Eight Trigram Sect took the comet to be an "auspicious blessing for their enterprise" to overthrow the Qing dynasty. They launched their uprising in 1813.

The comet was popularly thought to have portended Napoleon's invasion of Russia (even being referred to as "Napoleon's Comet") and the War of 1812, among other events. At the midpoint of War and Peace, Tolstoy describes the character of Pierre observing the "enormous and brilliant comet [...] which was said to portend all kinds of woes and the end of the world". In the musical Natasha, Pierre & The Great Comet of 1812, Pierre witnesses the comet. When asked why the comet made it into the title of the show, the composer Dave Malloy responded "for cosmic epicness".

The year 1811 proved to be particularly favorable for wine production, and merchants marketed "Comet Wine" at high prices for many years afterwards. The film Year of the Comet, a 1992 romantic comedy adventure film, is based on this premise and tells the story of the pursuit of a contemporarily discovered bottle of wine from the year of the Great Comet, bottled for Napoleon. The film stars Penelope Ann Miller, Tim Daly, and French film actor Louis Jourdan (his last film before retiring).

The Great Comet is mentioned in Pan Tadeusz by Adam Mickiewicz, and in Les Misérables by Victor Hugo.

The comet also acts as a divine source of revival for a dying hero in the Thomas Hardy novel Two on a Tower.

Native Americans interpreted the appearance of the comet as a vindication of Shawnee military leader Tecumseh's words: his name was translated as "shooting star", and the comet was seen as an omen during his mostly unsuccessful efforts that year to bring southern tribes into his pan-Native American alliance.
