= Boursault =

- Commune
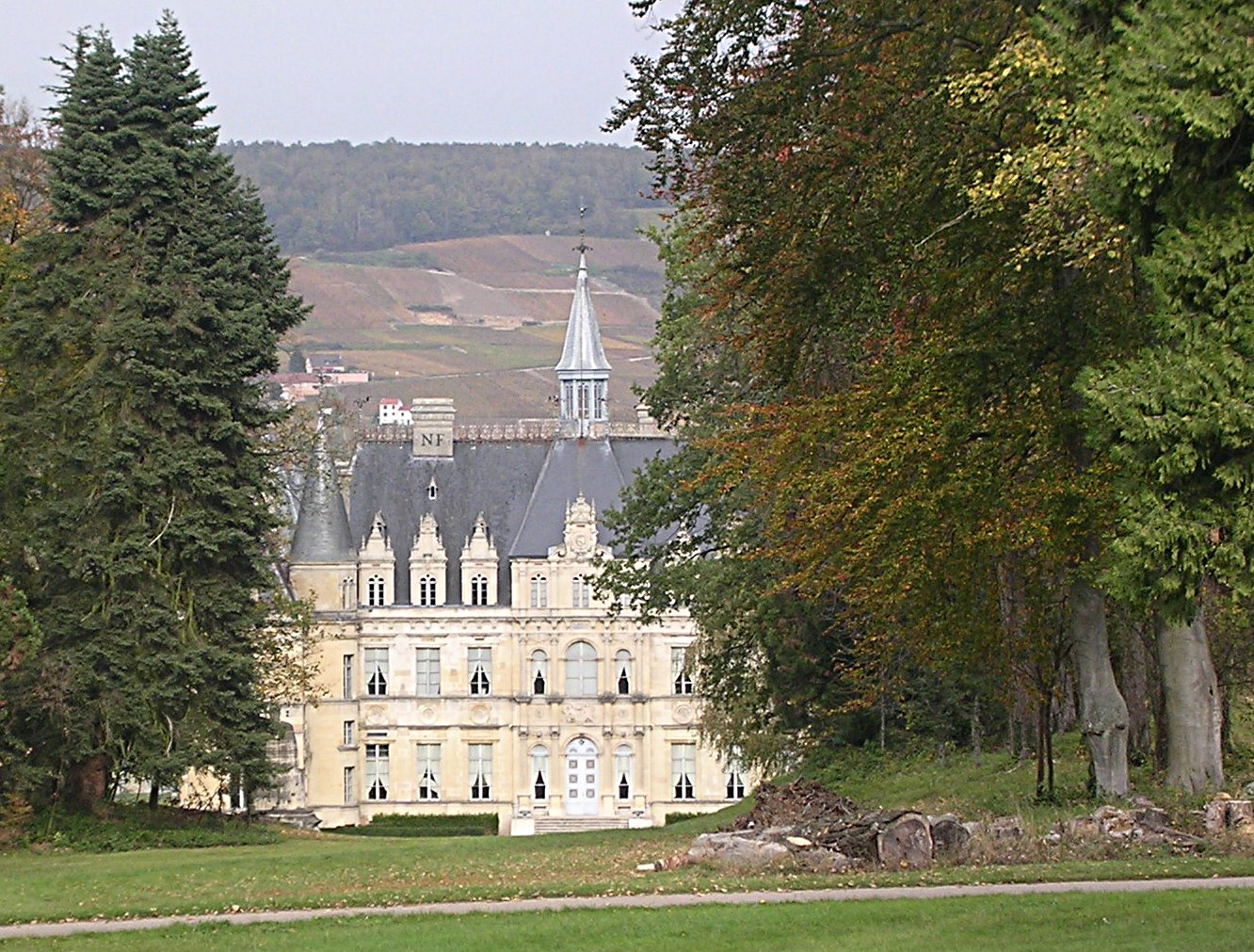
- Château de Boursault

- Coat of arms
- Location of Boursault
- Location within France Location within Grand Est
- Coordinates: 49°03′39″N 3°50′44″E
- Country: France
- Region: Grand Est
- Department: Marne
- Arrondissement: Épernay
- Canton: Dormans-Paysages de Champagne

Government
  - Mayor (2020–2026): Thérèse Lebrun-David
- Area^{1}: 16.45 km^{2} (6.35 sq mi)
- Elevation: 185 m (607 ft)
- Highest elevation: 245 m (804 ft)
- Lowest elevation: 65 m (213 ft)
- Population (2023): 393
  - Density: 23.9/km^{2} (61.9/sq mi)
- Time zone: UTC+01:00 (CET)
  - Summer (DST): UTC+02:00 (CEST)
- INSEE/Postal code: 51076 /51480
- ^{1} French Land Register data, which excludes lakes, ponds, glaciers > 1 km^{2} (0.386 sq mi or 247 acres) and river estuaries.

Boursault (French pronunciation: [buʁso]) is a commune of the Marne department in northeastern France.

== Population ==
Historical population
Year	Pop.	±% p.a.
1968	459	—
1975	466	+0.22%
1982	488	+0.66%
1990	462	−0.68%
1999	500	+0.88%
2007	465	−0.90%
2012	460	−0.22%
2017	451	−0.39%
2023	393	−2.27%
Source: INSEE

== See also ==
- Communes of the Marne department
