= Honoré Flaugergues =

French astronomer

Pierre-Gilles-Antoine-Honoré Flaugergues, usually known as Honoré Flaugergues (16 May 1755 in Viviers, Ardèche – 26 November 1835 or 20 November 1830) was a French astronomer.

== Biography ==
Flaugergues was born in Viviers, the son of magistrate Antoine-Dominique Flaugergues, whose family originated from Rouergue. His mother was Jean-Marie-Louise de Ratte, of a family of Montpellier gentry and the sister of mathematician and astronomer Étienne-Hyacinthe de Ratte. He first gained an interest in astronomy at the age of eight through reading Alain Manesson Mallet's Description de l'Univers. Under his father's guidance he showed early promise as a scientist, though he was never to study formally or attend university.

Although he published papers on a wide variety of subjects, it is as an amateur astronomer that he is best known. He was a longstanding friend and correspondent of Franz Xaver, Baron von Zach and Jerome Lalande. Though he was offered the post of director of the Toulon observatory in 1797, he refused it, preferring to stay in Viviers where he had become a Justice of the Peace and where he had a private observatory. In 1810 he was offered the directorship of Marseille observatory. He again refused.

Politically, Flaugergues was a supporter of the French Revolution, holding a number of local administrative posts in the 1790s in addition to serving as a magistrate. He was a member of the Institut de France and both the Royal Society and the Prussian Academy of Sciences.

His work eventually came to the notice of the government, who awarded him the Legion d'honneur and tried to induce him to come to Paris, but he again refused to leave the Ardeche, saying that Paris would "never give [him] the beautiful sky of Viviers".

== Scientific work ==
He discovered the "Great Comet of 1811" (C/1811 F1), and independently co-discovered the "Great Comet of 1807" (C/1807 R1).

In attempting to measure the rotation period of Mars, he noted inconsistencies in timing of yellow-colored features and concluded he was seeing atmospheric features rather than surface features. Therefore, some credit him with the discovery of dust clouds on Mars, however this is in dispute since his telescope was probably too small to accomplish this.

In addition to astronomy, he was active in medicine and archaeology, studying the maladies suffered by workers in the wool industry and organizing archaeological excavation at Alba-la-Romaine.

== Honours ==
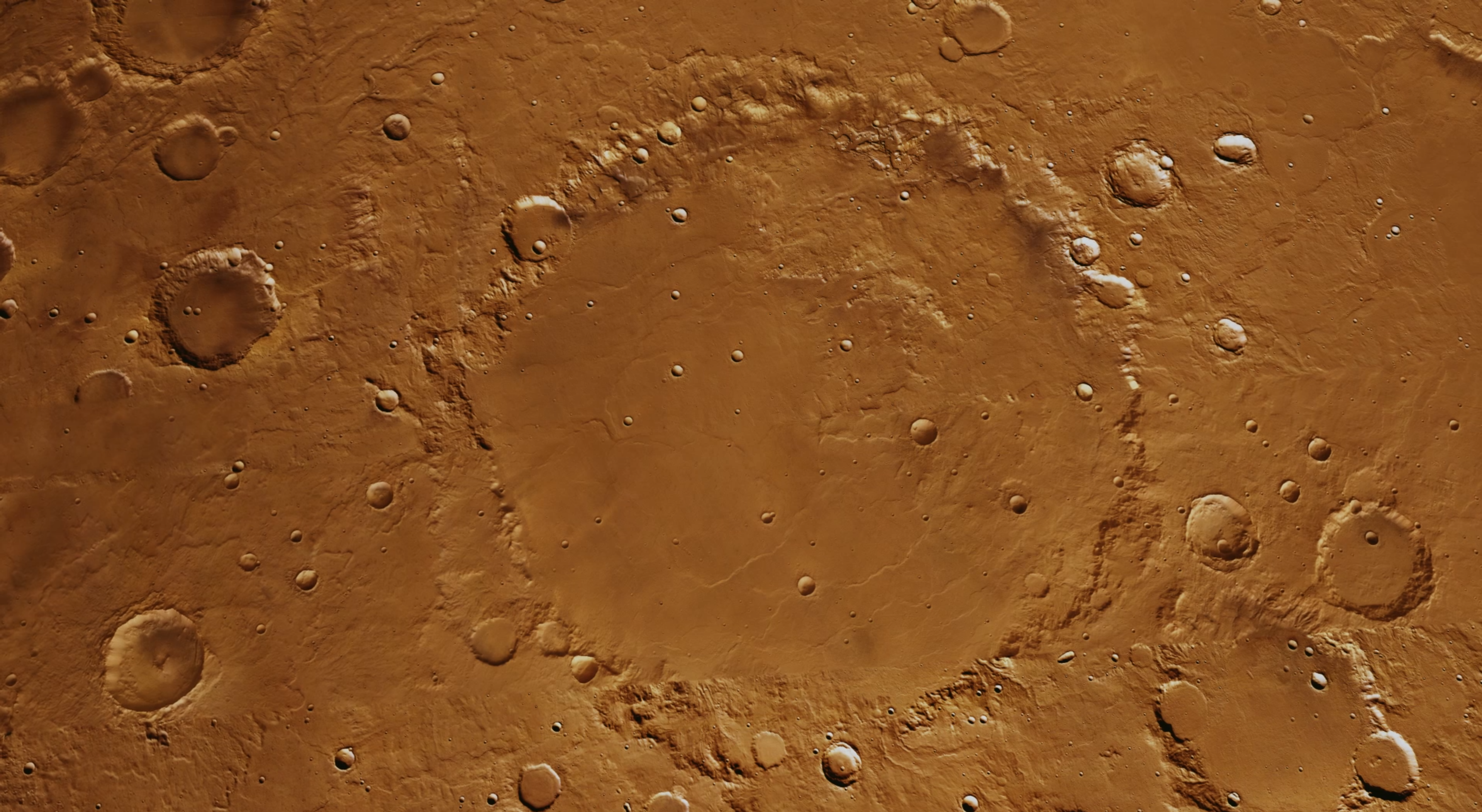
Flaugergues crater on Mars—picture taken by ESA's Mars Express

A crater on Mars is named after him.
