= Louis Bohne =

German businessman

Louis Bohne (died 1821), born in Mannheim, Germany, was the sales agent for Veuve Clicquot whose exploits during the French invasion of Russia and subsequent fall of Napoleon substantially increased the popularity of Champagne in Russia during the 19th century.

== Early work for the Clicquots ==
Louis Bohne first met Mme Clicquot's husband, François Clicquot, in Basel and began working for the Champagne house by peddling orders in England. Due to the saturation of many houses competing for the Champagne market there, Bohne was soon transferred to the relatively untapped market of Russia, Prussia and Austria. Once there, he was able to successfully integrate himself into the Russian Court and became close personal friends with the Tsar Alexander I and Tsarina Elisabeth Alexeievna, which greatly elevated the esteem of Clicquot Champagne within Saint Petersburg.

== Napoleonic War with Russia ==
In the summer of 1812, following Napoleon's invasion of Russia, the tsar issued a decree banning the import of French wines in bottles. This was a deliberate affront to Napoleon's patronage of Champagne since the only feasible way to transport the sparkling wine was in the bottles as storage in barrels would cause the wine to lose all effervescence. In an attempt to circumvent the ban, Bohne registered Veuve Clicquot as a coffee merchant and began smuggling in small quantities of bottles of champagne in barrels of coffee beans.

Following the Prussian occupation of Reims, Louis Bohne and Barbe-Nicole Clicquot worked out a scheme to smuggle a large quantity of Veuve Clicquot's 1811 vintage Cuvée de la Comète. While the Widow (Veuve in French) Clicquot distracted the stationed soldiers by opening up her cellars with all the champagne they could drink, Bohne coordinated the loading of a Dutch merchant vessel docked at Rouen with more than ten thousand bottles. Upon arrival in Königsberg, Bohne's shipment was met with eager enthusiasm by the Russian elite, with even the tsar himself making a visit. Soon the ban was lifted and a second shipment of this famous wine was quickly sent to Saint Petersburg. The first-to-market success of this venture firmly established Veuve Clicquot's stature as Russia became the second largest consumer of Champagne in the world.

== See also ==
- List of wine personalities
