= Women in France =

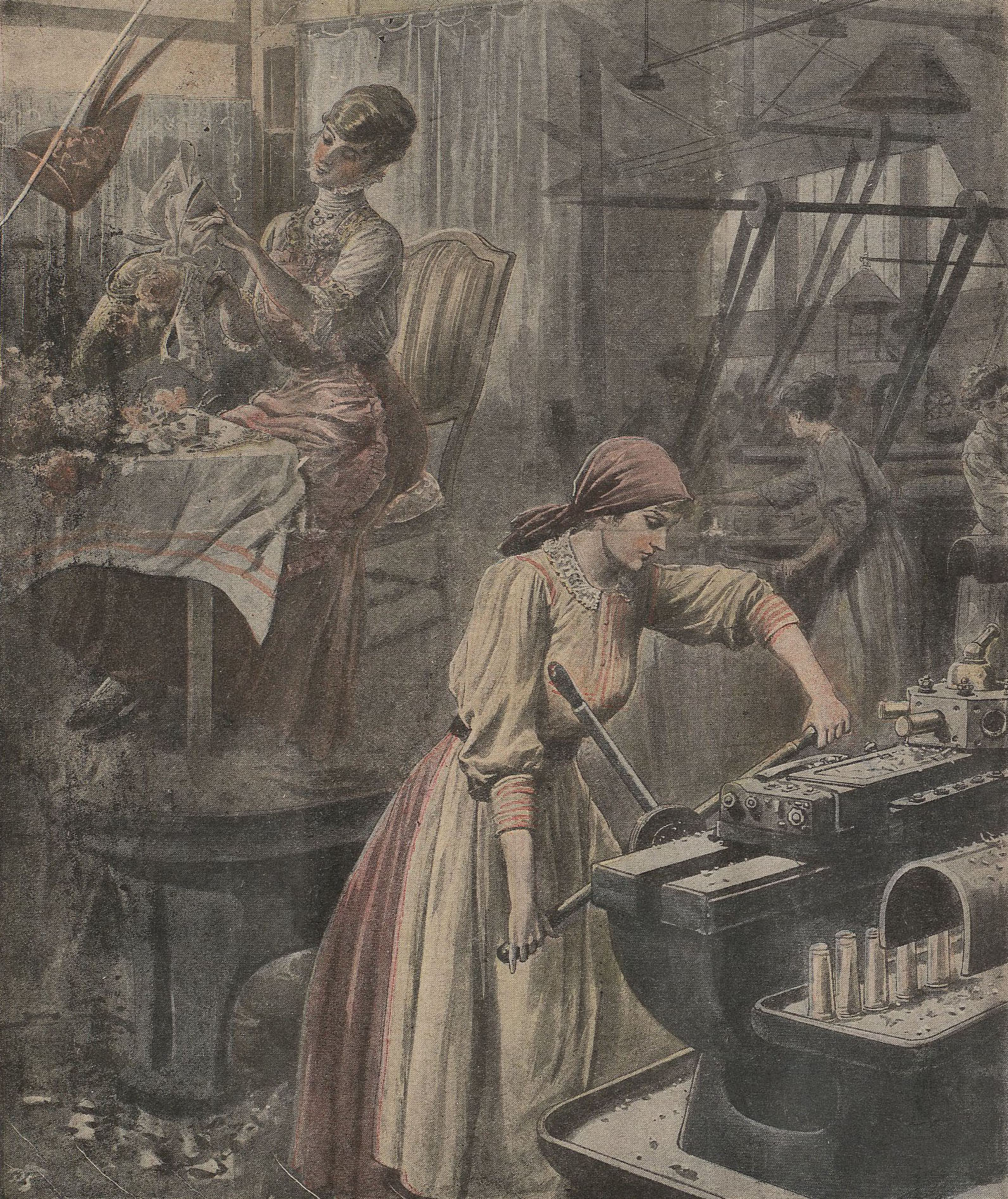
- A portrait about the social classes of French women in 1916

General statistics
- Maternal mortality (per 100,000): 5.1 (2021)
- Women in parliament: 38.65% (2017)
- Women over 25 with secondary education: 75.9% (2010)
- Women in labour force: 61.4% (employment rate OECD definition, 2016)

Gender Inequality Index
- Value: 0.083 (2021)
- Rank: 22nd out of 191

Global Gender Gap Index
- Value: 0.791 (2022)
- Rank: 15th out of 146

The roles of women in France have changed throughout history. In 1944, French women obtained women's suffrage. As in other Western countries, the role of women underwent many social and legal changes in the 1960s and 1970s. French feminism, which has its origins in the French Revolution, has been quite influential in the 20th century with regard to abstract ideology, especially through the writings of Simone de Beauvoir. In addition the article covers scholarly work on topics in history, education, reproductive rights, families, feminism, domestic violence, religion and art.

== History ==
The traditional role of women in French society involved domestic duties such as housekeeping, preparation of meals in the customary fashion that involves a "succession of courses eaten one at a time", child rearing, harvesting of crops, and tending to farm animals.

In the Middle Ages, education for girls was highly dependent on class status. While convents were the most prominent educational facilities for select girls from the upper classes from the 6th-13th centuries, some were also able to attend village or castle schools. In convents, they learned Latin reading and writing, weaving, painting, morals, manners and music.

Upon the onset of the Industrial Revolution in France, women's roles changed with them becoming domestic helpers, factory workers, and washerwomen. That did not generally include women who had bourgeoisie status, who often were dependent on the financial support of their husbands; such women of upper-class status also had the tendency to send their own children to wet nurses until weaned.

In the late 1800s, French women and girls demanded access to education, including high school diplomas and university admissions. In 1871, Julie Daubié became the first woman to graduate from the Sorbonne, followed a number of years later by Marie Curie.

Very slow population growth, especially compared to that of Germany, continued to be a serious issue in the early 20th century. Natalists wanted higher marriage rates and higher birth rates among the French, but they also encouraged immigration from the rest of Europe. Propagandists from the French pro-natalist movement advised women that they were abandoning their family responsibilities under the influence of feminism. One new role was for French women to marry "assimilable" immigrants in order to produce "indubitably French offspring." The Conseil Supérieur de la Natalité campaigned for provisions enacted in the Code de la Famille (1939), which increased state assistance to families with children and required employers to protect the jobs of fathers, including those who were immigrants, during the Great Depression.

The status of women in France took a major step forward in 1944, when French women finally gained the right to vote – decades later than other European countries, Australia or the United States. However, it was only in 1965 that they won the right to work without permission from their husbands, in addition to the right to open personal bank accounts. In 1967, the Neuwirth Law legalized French women's access to oral contraception, and in 1975, the Veil Act legalized abortion.

Due to effective health care provision in the country, as of 2024, the life expectancy of women in France is at an average of 85.6 years old.

=== Education ===
Educational aspirations were rising and becoming increasingly institutionalised to supply the church and the state with the civil servants to serve as their future administrators. Girls were schooled too but not to assume political responsibility. They were ineligible for leadership positions and were generally considered to have an inferior intellect to that of their brothers. France had many small local schools in which working-class children, both boys and girls, learned to read, the better "to know, love, and serve God." The sons and daughters of the noble and bourgeois elites were given gender-specific educations: boys were sent to upper school, perhaps a university, and their sisters, if they were lucky enough to leave the house, would be sent to board at a convent with a vague curriculum.

The Enlightenment challenged that model, but no real alternative was presented for female education. Only through education at home were knowledgeable upper-class women formed, usually to the sole end of dazzling their salons.

== Reproductive rights and health ==
Women in France obtained many reproductive rights in the second half of the 20th century. The Neuwirth Act of 1967 authorized contraception. The Veil Law of 1975 legalized abortion. The maternal mortality rate in France is 8.00 deaths/100,000 live births (as of 2010). France's HIV/AIDS rate is 0.4% of adults (aged 15–49) - estimates of 2009. France has been one of the first countries to take legal action against female genital mutilation (which occurs in its immigrant communities) and to prosecute those who perform the practice.

== Family life ==
Percentage of births to unmarried women, in selected countries, including France, 1980 and 2007. As in other Western countries, in France the percentage of children born outside of marriage has increased markedly during the past decades.

In common with other countries in Mediterranean Europe and of Roman Catholic tradition, French organization of family life has traditionally been conservative and founded on distinct gender roles. Under the Napoleonic Code, married women were subordinated to the husband's authority. Married French women obtained the right to work without their husband's consent in 1965. The paternal authority of a man over his family was ended in 1970 (before that, parental responsibilities belonged solely to the father who made all legal decisions concerning the children); and a new reform in 1985 abolished the stipulation that the father had the sole power to administer the children's property. Adultery was decriminalized in 1975. In 1990, a case in which a man had tortured and raped his wife had the Court of Cassation authorise the prosecution of spouses for rape or sexual assault. In 1992, the Court of Cassation convicted a man of the rape of his wife and stated that the presumption that spouses have consented to sexual acts that occur within marriage is valid only if the contrary is not proven. Until 1994, France kept in the French Penal Code the article from 1810 that exonerated rapists if they later married their victim, and in 1994, Law 94-89 criminalized all marital rape.

In 1999, France introduced PACS (a civil union, known as "civil solidarity pact", which can be contracted both by heterosexual and by same-sex couples). In 2005, France reformed its divorce laws, simplifying the procedure, in particular by reducing the separation period, necessary before a divorce in certain circumstances, from 6 years to 2 years (reduced to one year in 2021); there are now four types of divorce that can be obtained (divorce by mutual consent; divorce by acceptance; hostile divorce; divorce for separation). A law, passed 4 April 2006, makes rape by a partner (including in unmarried relationships, marriages, and civil unions) an aggravating circumstance in prosecuting rape.

In the past decades, social views on the traditional family have changed markedly, which is reflected in the high proportion of cohabitation and births outside of marriage and in a questioning of traditional expectations regarding the family; in the European Values Study (EVS) of 2008, 35.4% of respondents in France agreed with the assertion "Marriage is an outdated institution".

As of 2023, 63,9% of children were born outside of marriage. In France, legal reforms regarding the "illegitimacy" of children (born outside of marriage) began in the 1970s, but it was only in the 21st century that the principle of equality was fully upheld (through Act no. 2002-305 of 4 March 2002, removing mention of "illegitimacy" — filiation légitime and filiation naturelle and through Law 2009-61 of 16 January 2009). In 2001, France was forced by the European Court of Human Rights to change several laws that were deemed discriminatory, and in 2013, the Court ruled that those changes must be applied also to children born before 2001.

== Feminism ==
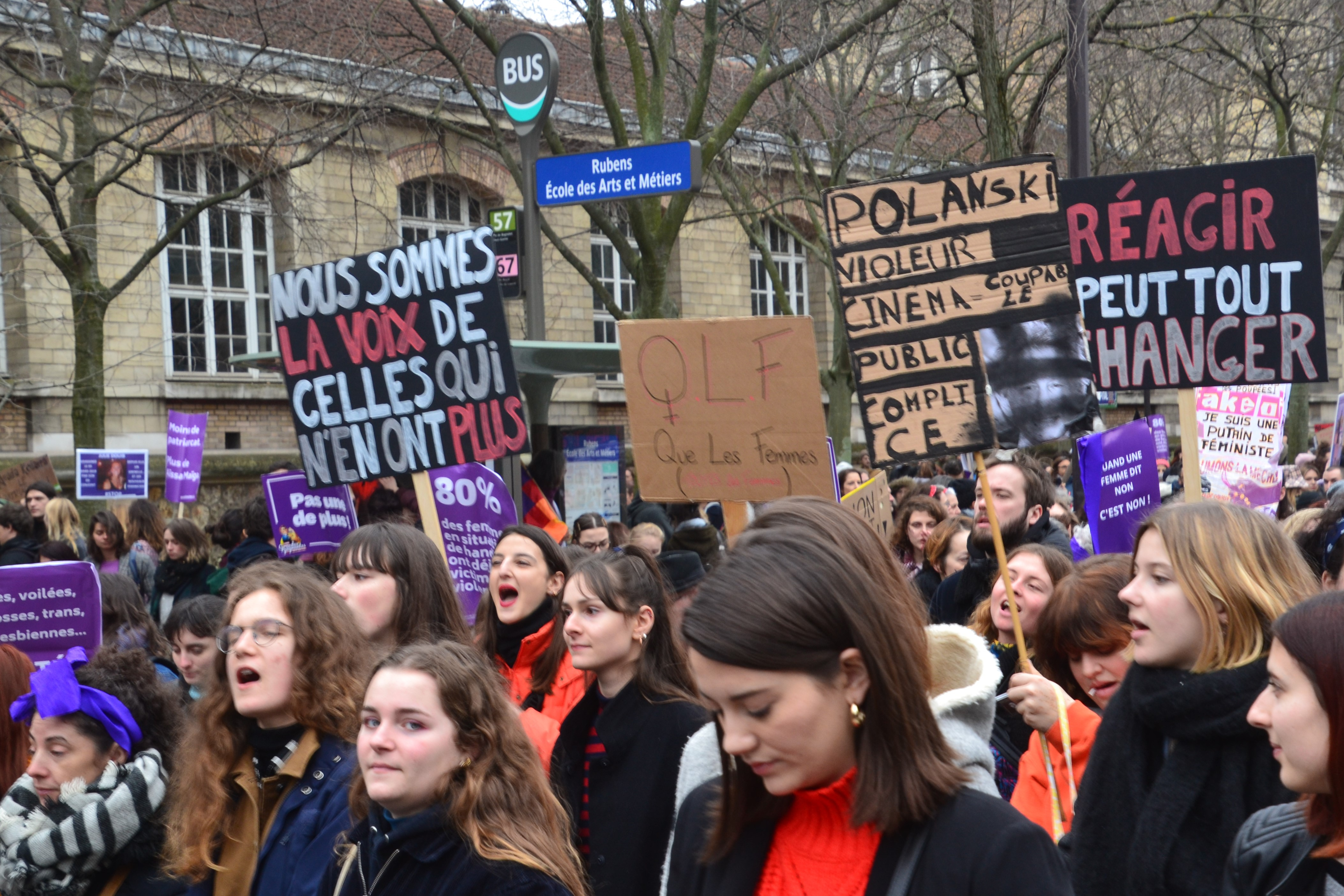
International Women's Day march in Paris

Feminism in France has its origins in the French Revolution. Some famous figures were notable in the 19th century, including Louise Michel, Russian-born Elisabeth Dmitrieff and Nathalie Lemel. French feminism encompasses a branch of feminist theories and philosophies that emerged in the 1970s to the 1990s. This French feminist theory, compared to Anglophone feminism, is distinguished by an approach which is more philosophical and literary, rather than focused on practical issues. Its writings tend to be effusive and metaphorical being less concerned with political doctrines.

Simone de Beauvoir, a French writer, intellectual, existentialist philosopher, political activist and social theorist, is a prominent feminist figure. She is known for her 1949 treatise The Second Sex, a detailed analysis of women's oppression and a foundational tract of contemporary feminism.

== Domestic violence ==
In the 21st century, France has taken many steps in order to combat domestic violence and violence against women, in particular by enacting Law No. 2010-769, of July 9, 2010, on Violence Against Women, Violence Between Spouses, and the Effects of These Types of Violence on Children. France has also ratified the Convention on preventing and combating violence against women and domestic violence.

France has a long tradition of indulgence towards crimes of passion, which before 1975 were treated legally very leniently. In France, as of 2004 to 2009, former and current partners were responsible for more than 80% of all cases of murders of women.

== Religion ==
The traditional religion of France is Roman Catholicism, but today it is no longer the state religion; and contemporary France is one of the most secular countries in Europe. In France, freedom of religion is guaranteed by the 1789 Declaration of the Rights of Man and of the Citizen. The Republic is based on the principle of laïcité enforced by the 1880s Jules Ferry laws and the 1905 French law on the Separation of the Churches and the State. Today, France also has a sizable Muslim population. In 2010, France enacted a ban on face covering, prohibiting the wearing of niqab, burqa and similar outfits in public places. In 2014, the European Court of Human Rights upheld the French law, accepting the argument of the French government that the law was based on "a certain idea of living together".

== In art ==
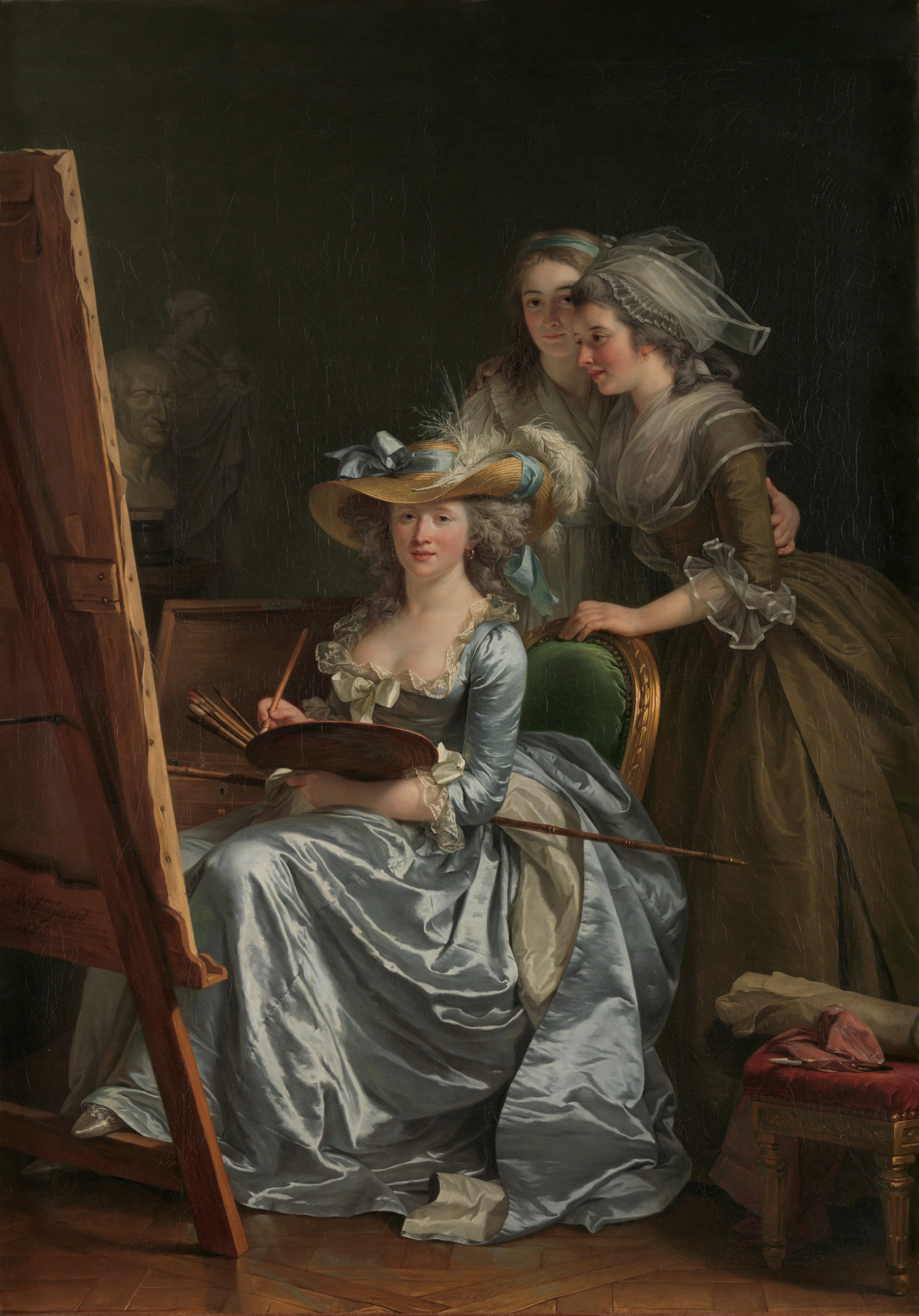
Self-portrait with two pupils, by Adélaïde Labille-Guiard, 1785. The two pupils are Marie Capet and Carreaux de Rosemond.

Particularly noteworthy French women painters during the late 18th century include Adélaïde Labille-Guiard, Anne Vallayer-Coster, and Louise Élisabeth Vigée Le Brun. Vallayer-Coster was prominent for her figural paintings of King Louis XV's daughters and his daughter-in-law Marie Antoinette. Marie Antoinette and the Mesdames de France, also helped Labille-Guiard and Vigée Le Brun obtain admission to the Académie which caused a huge stir among the press, who decided to pit them as rivals against each other. The French Revolution of 1789 created a hostile environment for artists at the time, particularly those supported by the royal family. Vigée Le Brun and Vallayer-Coster, along with many other female artists, fled to other parts of Europe and Russia. Labille-Guiard, however, chose to stay and built a respectable reputation painting the faces of the Revolution. After the Revolution, lesser known women artists were able to use the now wide-open biennial Salon (France) to display their art to a more receptive audience.

After the French Revolution, the number of French women artists sharply declined. It was the monarchy who gave women artists, especially painters, the opportunities to succeed. The Royal Academy was closed down and replaced with an institution that barred the admittance of women. Some female artists close to the monarchy were even executed. It wasn't until the end of the 19th century that a significant number of women were combating stereotypical gender roles. Traditional gender roles hindered prospective French women's artistic careers. While drawing and painting at the amateur level was encouraged as a part of a good bourgeois education, women were not socially permitted to engage in professional careers that were deemed unimportant to society and/or disrupted in the perceived women's role of being a fully functional wife and mother. Many of the artists of this time felt the need to choose between a career and marriage. Also, any female students who did receive training from a skilled artist, and the limited expectations generally had them left with the simplest of artistic tasks. In 1860, Marie Bracquemond, a rising impressionist artist, quipped of her instructor, famous painter Jean-Auguste-Dominique Ingres, "The severity of Monsieur Ingres frightened me... because he doubted the courage and perseverance of a woman in the field of painting... He would assign to them only the painting of flowers, of fruits, of still lifes, portraits and genre scenes."

In the 1870s, life drawing classes became more open to French female students aspiring to be artists in Paris. Perhaps the most successful French woman artist in this era was Rosa Bonheur, who was well known for her animal paintings as well her sculptures. At a time that was dominated by male artistic ability, Bonheur is received very positively and rated very well among all of her peers. In an attempt to reject the gender roles, she cut and maintained a short hairstyle and also requested permission from the police to wear man's pants in order to remain relatively unnoticed in farms and slaughterhouses while she painted animals and studied animal anatomy. Due to concerns like this, women were more likely to embrace movements like the Impressionism that put artistic emphasis on everyday subjects, and not historical themes, that could be painted at home. Despite these hindrances, France was still one of the leading countries for the private tutelage of artistic women at the end of the 18th century. When the École des Beaux-Arts—the primary training facility—eventually succumbed to heavy pressure and began admitting women in 1897, France was no longer the hold-out in providing women with a state-sponsored education.

Women painters built their own support network in Paris. By the 1880, the Union des Femmes Peintres et Sculpteurs played a central role although only a select few women were admitted into quality artistic schools, including the prestigious Académie royale de peinture et de sculpture (Royal Academy). Camille Claudel (1864–1943) was at first censored as she portrayed sexuality in her work. Her response was a symbolic intellectual style that was opposed to the "expressive" approach that was normally attributed to women artists. Her work became well regarded.

With regard to literature, France is well known for the writer George Sand (the pseudonym of Amantine Lucile Aurore Dupin).

== See also ==
- Feminism in France
- Women's history
- Ancien Régime
- History of France
- Women in the French Resistance
- Women in Europe
