= Trouvelot (disambiguation) =

Étienne Léopold Trouvelot was a French astronomer and entomologist.

Trouvelot may also refer to:

- Trouvelot (lunar crater)
- Trouvelot (Martian crater)
