= C/1881 K1 (Tebbutt) =

Great Comet of 1881

C/1881 K1 (Tebbutt) (Great Comet of 1881)
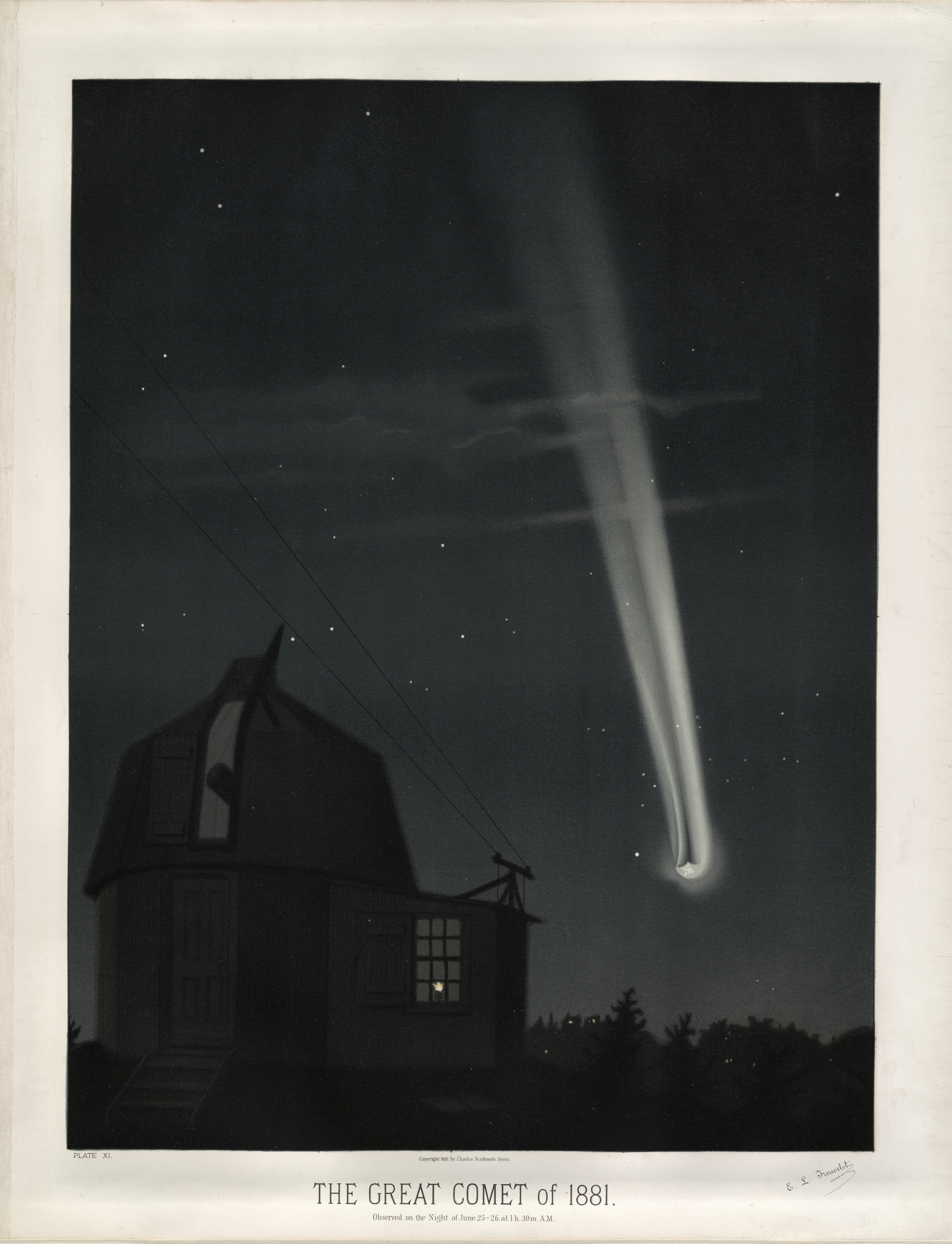
- The Great Comet of 1881, chromolithograph by E. L. Trouvelot

Discovery
- Discovered by: John Tebbutt
- Discovery site: Windsor, Australia
- Discovery date: 22 May 1881

Designations
- Alternative designations: 1881 III, 1881b

Orbital characteristics
- Epoch: 14 August 1881 (JD 2408306.5)
- Observation arc: 232 days
- Number of observations: 157
- Aphelion: ~357 AU
- Perihelion: 0.735 AU
- Semi-major axis: ~180 AU
- Eccentricity: 0.9959
- Orbital period: ~2,395 years
- Inclination: 63.425°
- Longitude of ascending node: 272.63°
- Argument of periapsis: 354.23°
- Last perihelion: 16 June 1881
- T_{Jupiter}: 0.504
- Earth MOID: 0.279 AU
- Jupiter MOID: 3.020 AU

Physical characteristics
- Comet total magnitude (M1): 4.1
- Apparent magnitude: 1.0 (1881 apparition)

C/1881 K1, also called the Great Comet of 1881, Comet Tebbutt, 1881 III, and 1881b, is a non-periodic comet discovered by Australian amateur astronomer John Tebbutt on 22 May 1881 at Windsor, New South Wales. It is called a great comet because of its brightness at its last apparition.

== Observations ==
On 1 June, Tebbutt found the length of the tail to be 8° 38′. The comet was observed in the southern hemisphere from its discovery to 11 June; it then became visible in the night sky of the northern hemisphere by June 22 as a spectacular object to the naked eye. On June 25 the tail's length was about 25° and the brightness of the nucleus was magnitude 1. The comet was still visible to the naked eye in August but by the end of the month the tail was not discernible. In the Alps, at an altitude of between 1,000 and 2,000 meters, Camille Flammarion observed the comet until the beginning of September. The last successful telescope observation of the comet was on 15 February 1882.

For Tebbutt's Comet of 1881, Henry Draper took the first wide-angle photograph of a comet's tail and the first spectrum of a comet's head. Andrew Common used his Newtonian reflecting telescope with 36-inch mirror to photograph the comet.

== Orbit ==
Preliminary orbital calculations of C/1881 K1 by Benjamin Apthorp Gould and John Tebbutt noted a close resemblance with that of the Great Comet of 1807, suggesting that the two comets may be related to one another despite a long orbital period of 1,540 years. However, recalculations by Johannes Riem in 1894 demonstrated that Tebbutt's comet had a longer orbital period between 2,409 and 2,446 years, concluding that the two great comets are totally different from one another.

== Tebbutt’s account ==
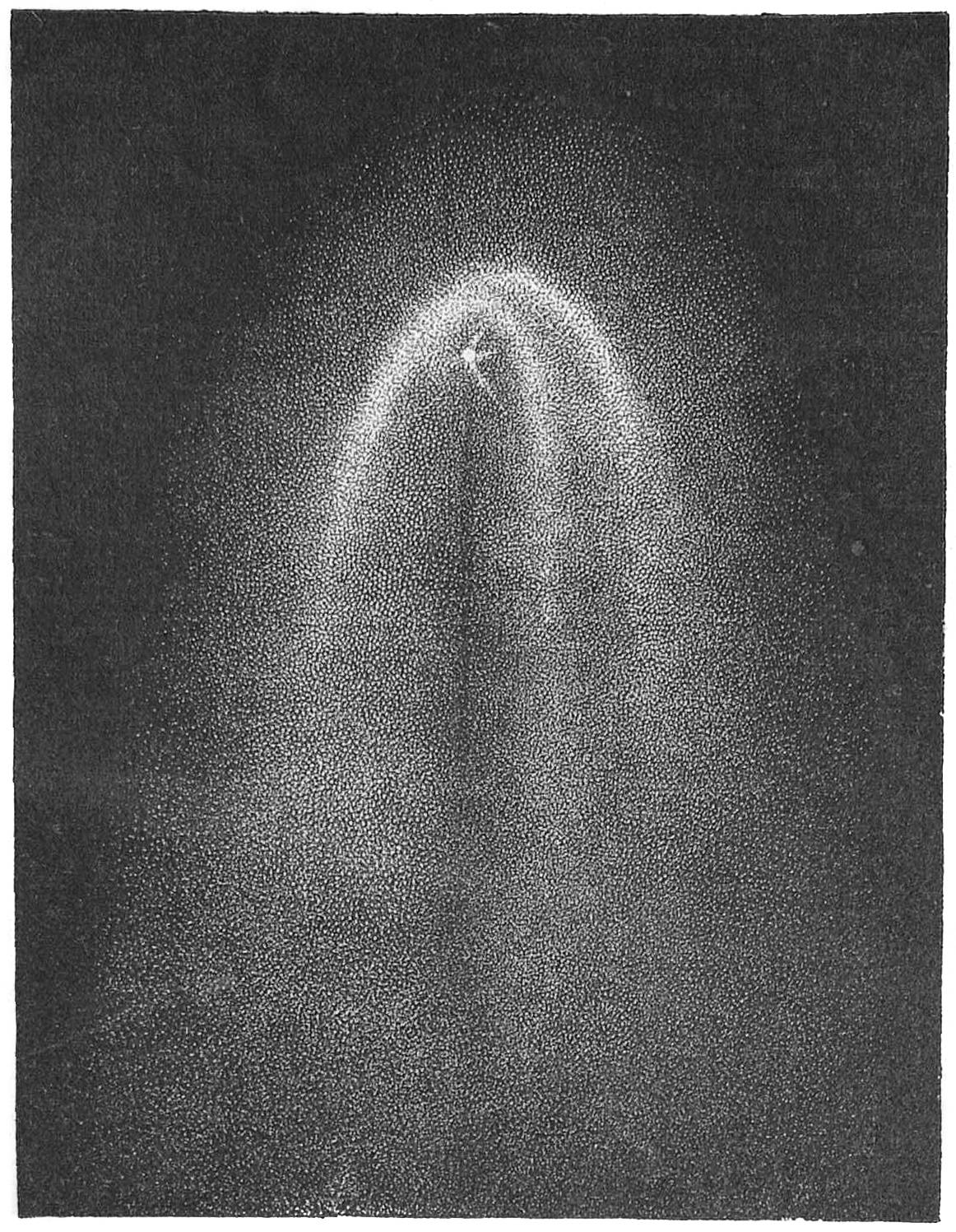
The Great Comet of 1881, image published in Die Gartenlaube

In his Astronomical Memoirs in the section entitled 1881, John Tebbutt gave an account of his discovery:

This year, like 1861, was signalised by the discovery of a great comet. While scanning the western sky with the unassisted eye on the evening of May 22, I discovered just below the constellation Columba a hazy looking object which, from my familiarity with that part of the heavens, I regarded as new. On examining it with the small marine telescope previously referred to in these memoirs, I found it to consist really of three objects, namely, two stars of the 4 1/2 and 5 1/2 magnitude afterwards identified as γ^{1} and y^{2} Cæli, and a head of a comet. I could not find any trace of a tail, but on the 25th it exhibited a tail about two degrees in length. Immediately on its discovery I obtained, with the 4 1/2 equatorial, eight good measures of the nucleus from one of the bright stars just mentioned. On the following day I notified the discovery to the Government Observatories at Sydney and Melbourne. A series of filar micrometer comparisons was obtained at Windsor, extending from the date of discovery to June 11, when the comet disappeared from our morning sky and became an object for the northern observatories. ...
