= Peninsula House and Tebbutt's Observatory =

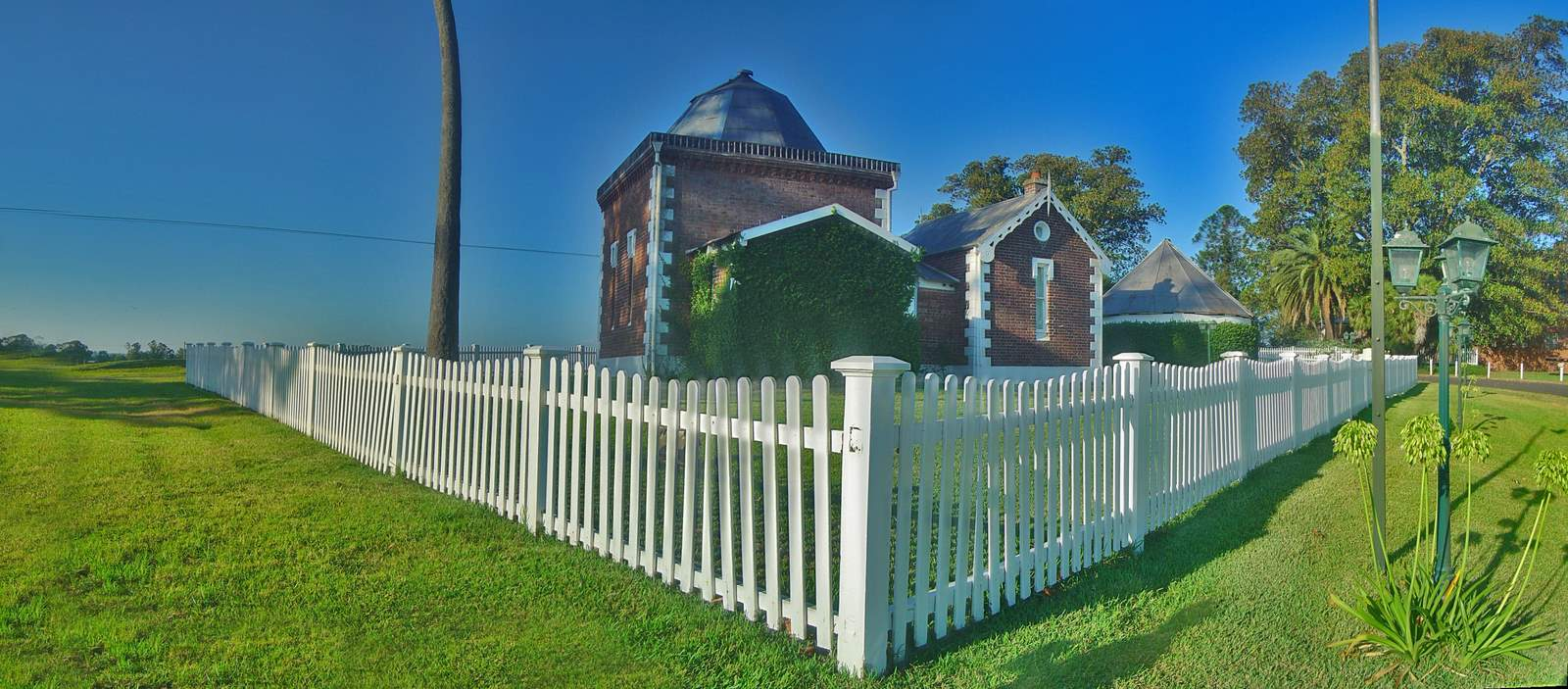
- Tebbutt's Observatory, pictured in 2007

- Location within Sydney Location within Australia
- 33°36′26″S 150°49′53″E
- Location: Palmer Street, Windsor, City of Hawkesbury, New South Wales, Australia

History
- Built: 1845

New South Wales Heritage Register
- Official name: Peninsula House, Tebbutt's Observatory; The Peninsular House; Peninsular House; Tebbutt's Observatory
- Type: State heritage (landscape)
- Designated: 2 April 1999
- Reference no.: 28
- Type: Homestead Complex
- Category: Farming and Grazing
- Builders: John Tebbutt

Peninsula House and Tebbutt's Observatory is a heritage-listed residence and former observatory at Palmer Street, Windsor, City of Hawkesbury, New South Wales, Australia. The observatory was built in 1845 by John Tebbutt. It was added to the New South Wales State Heritage Register on 2 April 1999.

== History ==
=== Indigenous history ===
The lower Hawkesbury was home to the Dharug people. The proximity to the Nepean River and South Creek qualifies it as a key area for food resources for indigenous groups. The Dharug and Darkinjung people called the river Deerubbin and it was a vital source of food and transport.

=== Colonial history ===
Governor Arthur Phillip explored the local area in search of suitable agricultural land in 1789 and discovered and named the Hawkesbury River after Baron Hawkesbury. This region played a significant role in the early development of the colony with European settlers established here by 1794. Situated on fertile floodplains and well known for its abundant agriculture, Green Hills (as it was originally called) supported the colony through desperate times. However, frequent flooding meant that the farmers along the riverbanks were often ruined.

The area on which the Peninsula House complex now stands is located on land first alienated for European purposes in a grant made by Francis Grose of thirty acres to Samuel Wilcox, who named it Wilcox Farm. It is likely that land clearance and agricultural activities as well as some building works took place during this period and during the subsequent of occupation. The former Wilcox farm was incorporated into a larger holding of 607 hectares (1,500 acres) known as Peninsula Farm in the early nineteenth century.

Governor Lachlan Macquarie replaced Governor Bligh, assuming the office on 1 January 1810. Under his influence the colony prospered. His vision was for a free community, working in conjunction with the penal colony. He implemented an unrivalled public works program, completing 265 public buildings, establishing new public amenities and improving existing services such as roads. Under his leadership Hawkesbury district thrived. He visited the district on his first tour and recorded in his journal on 6 December 1810: "After dinner I chrestened the new townships...I gave the name of Windsor to the town intended to be erected in the district of the Green Hills...the township in the Richmond district I have named Richmond..." The district reminded Macquarie of those towns in England, whilst Castlereagh, Pitt Town and Wilberforce were named after English statesmen. These are often referred to as Macquarie's Five Towns. Their localities, chiefly Windsor and Richmond, became more permanent with streets, town square and public buildings.

=== Peninsular House and Tebbutt's Observatory ===
In 1842 John Tebbutt's father who had migrated as a free settler in 1801 to the Hawkesbury as a successful farmer, acquired land on this "peninsula" and built the Peninsula House (also known as Peninsular House) in 1845. A two-storey wing was later added at the rear.

John Tebbutt (1824–1916) was born at Windsor, educated locally and developed an interest in astronomy. He was inspired by his school teacher, Edward Quaife, who encouraged him. He became passionately interested in mechanical objects and "celestial mechanisms", gradually accumulating instruments and experience. Tebbutt bought his first instrument, a marine sextant, in 1853. He achieved international fame when he was the first to discover the "Great Comet of 1861", announcing his discovery of one of the finest comets on record. In 1862 he refused the position of Government Astronomer for New South Wales because it meant leaving Windsor.

In either 1863 or 1864, John Tebbutt erected a small round wooden observatory in the garden (since demolished). A second circular structure was built in 1874 and in 1879 he built a second, larger circular observatory close to the old one.

Tebbutt was a private astronomer and a fellow of the Royal Astronomical Society who continued to make patient, reliable astronomical observations and published regularly, building an international reputation.

From the observatories he watched various astronomical phenomena - lunar occultations of stars, Jupiter's satellites, comets, minor planets, double stars, transits of Mercury and Venus - and his work won international acknowledgement.

In 1872 he bought an 11.4 centimetres (4.5 in) refracting telescope with which he observed the transit of Venus in 1874 and in 1886 imported a 200 millimetres (7.9 in) Grubb refracting telescope and housed it in a substantial brick observatory building on his property at Windsor. The telescope later went to New Zealand but was returned to Australia at the time of the Australian Bicentenary and rehoused in its original location. Hawkesbury City Council now owns the telescope.

Tebbutt spent his whole life at Windsor, devoting most of his time to astronomy. He never left Australia, but corresponded with colleagues around the world and published widely. Tebbutt's "Astronomical Memoirs" of 1908 listed his 371 publications in various learned journals. His image and the observatory was on the $100 note from 1984 to 1996.

He had six daughters and one son. He died in 1916 and was buried in the Anglican cemetery in a vault that he designed himself. The funeral was one of the largest ever held at Windsor. His direct descendants owned and occupied the house until 2017.

== Description ==
Peninsula House and the former observatory sit on a 3.23 hectares (8.0 acres) site located close to Windsor on high ground, which, when the river (Hawkesbury) floods, becomes a secluded, unspoilt island, filled with native plants and fauna and protected from development.

=== Peninsula House ===
Peninsula House is a two-storey Georgian style house of sandstock brick. The main roof and verandah are slate, the latter supported on delicate cast iron columns, the centre bay marked with a simple pediment. There are six-panel doors and windows are six pane double hung sashes with stone sills and were originally shuttered, whilst sandstone is used for the foundations, a string course and flagging to the verandah. A two-storey late Victorian brick wing was built at the rear. The original house contains some fine Georgian marble chimney pieces and cedar joinery.

=== Tebbutt's Observatory ===
There are two brick observatories in the old garden. The smaller one is circular with a segmental flat iron pitched roof. The larger one is also face brick with sandstone quoins, classical pediment over a porch and dentilled cornice to the roof parapet. Windows are of unusual proportions with stuccoed decorations and timber shutters, while the iron segmental roof is double pitched octagonal in form.

=== Other outbuildings ===
The original stable building was a separate building formerly used as a function centre, able to seat 100 guests. Facilities such as a manager's office and lock-up storage bays.

=== Garden ===
A mature garden setting surrounds the house with large mature trees including towering hoop pines (Araucaria cunninghamii), Eucalyptus spp., Canary Island date palm (Phoenix canariensis) and others.

=== Modifications and dates ===
- 1845 – Peninsula House built
- 1864 – smaller observatory built
- 1879 – larger observatory built
- 2004–05 – federal CHHP funding 2004/05 of $84,425 to replace the leaking roof and other repairs

== Heritage listing ==
Peninsula House and Tebbutt's Observatory is an important and unique group of early and late Victorian buildings remaining in good condition and having an interesting historical genesis. The buildings, with the surrounding rural landscape, make an outstanding contribution to the northeastern area of Windsor.

The Tebbutt Peninsula House was built in 1845 by famous amateur astronomer, John Tebbutt II, who discovered two comets which today bear his name.

Peninsula House and Tebbutt's Observatory was listed on the New South Wales State Heritage Register on 2 April 1999 having satisfied the following criteria.

The place is important in demonstrating the course, or pattern, of cultural or natural history in New South Wales.

An important and unique group of early and late Victorian buildings remaining in good condition and having an interesting historical genesis. Associated with amateur astronomer John Tebbutt who achieved international recognition for his work at Windsor.

The place is important in demonstrating aesthetic characteristics and/or a high degree of creative or technical achievement in New South Wales.

Unusual and fine early observatory structure. The buildings, with the surrounding rural landscape, make an outstanding contribution to the north eastern area of Windsor.

The place possesses uncommon, rare or endangered aspects of the cultural or natural history of New South Wales.

Rare early private observatory.

The place is important in demonstrating the principal characteristics of a class of cultural or natural places/environments in New South Wales.

Characteristic of early colonial houses in the area.

== See also ==
- List of astronomical observatories
