= Great Comet of 1807 =

Non-periodic comet

C/1807 R1 (Parisi) (Great Comet of 1807)
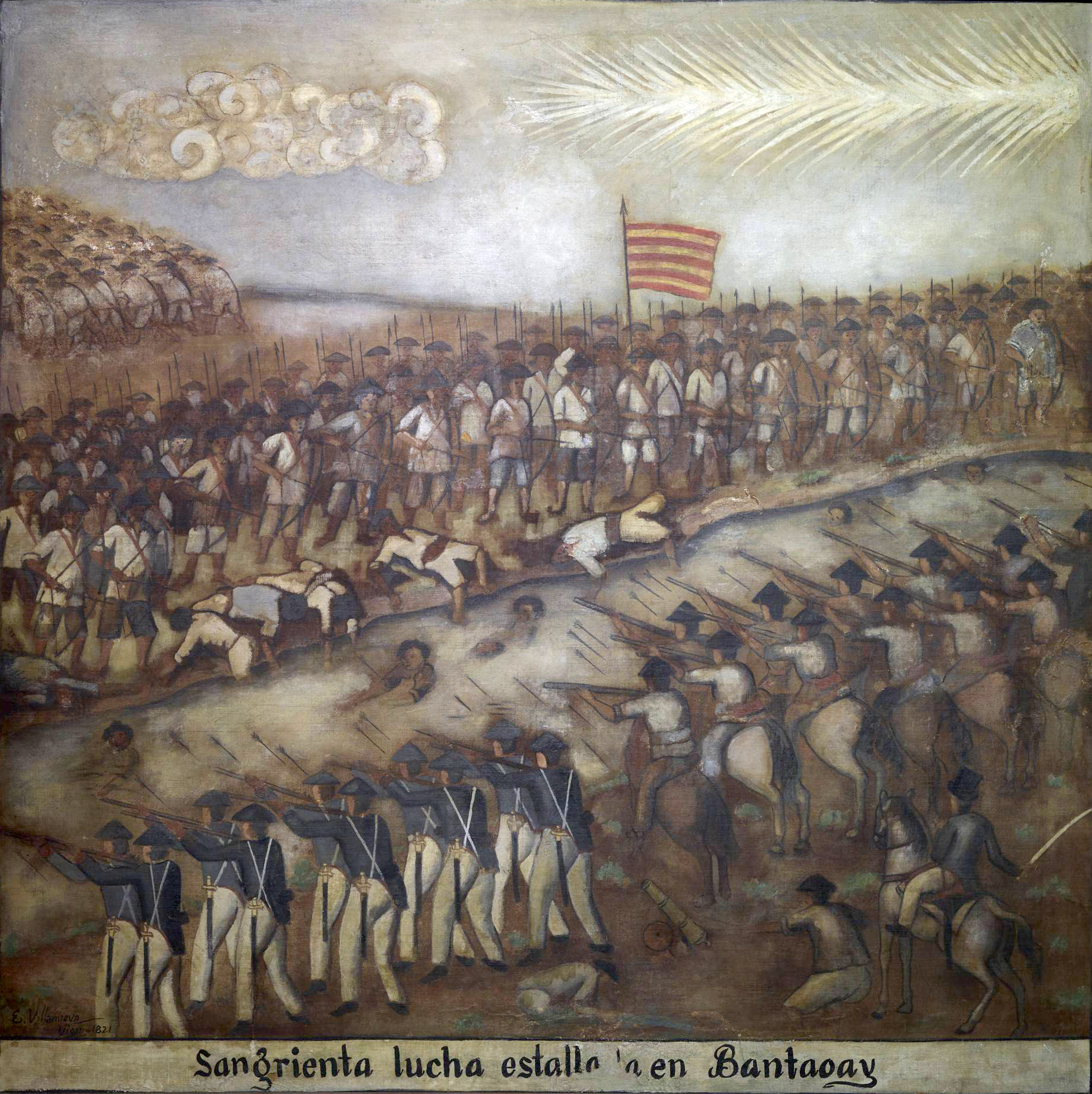
- The Great Comet of 1807 seen from the Philippines, as depicted by Esteban Villanueva during the Basi Revolt

Discovery
- Discovered by: Fr. P. Reggente Parisi
- Discovery site: Castrogiovanni, Italy
- Discovery date: 9 September 1807

Orbital characteristics
- Epoch: 19 September 1807 (JD 2381313.7389)
- Observation arc: 187 days
- Number of observations: 70
- Aphelion: 285.76 AU
- Perihelion: 0.6461 AU
- Semi-major axis: 143.20 AU
- Eccentricity: 0.9955
- Orbital period: ~1,714 years
- Inclination: 63.176°
- Longitude of ascending node: 269.48°
- Argument of periapsis: 4.097°
- Last perihelion: 19 September 1807
- T_{Jupiter}: 0.486

Physical characteristics
- Mean radius: 4.92 km (3.06 mi) (Note: Calculated mean radius using the formula: $\log_{10}\,(\,R\,)\ =\;0.9 +\;0.13 (\,H\,)$ Where $\,H\,$ is the comet's absolute total magnitude (M1))
- Comet total magnitude (M1): 1.6
- Apparent magnitude: 1.0 (1807 apparition)

C/1807 R1, also known as the Great Comet of 1807, is a long-period comet. It was visible to naked-eye observers in the northern hemisphere from early September 1807 to late December, and is ranked among the great comets due to its exceptional brightness.

== Observational history ==
=== Discovery ===
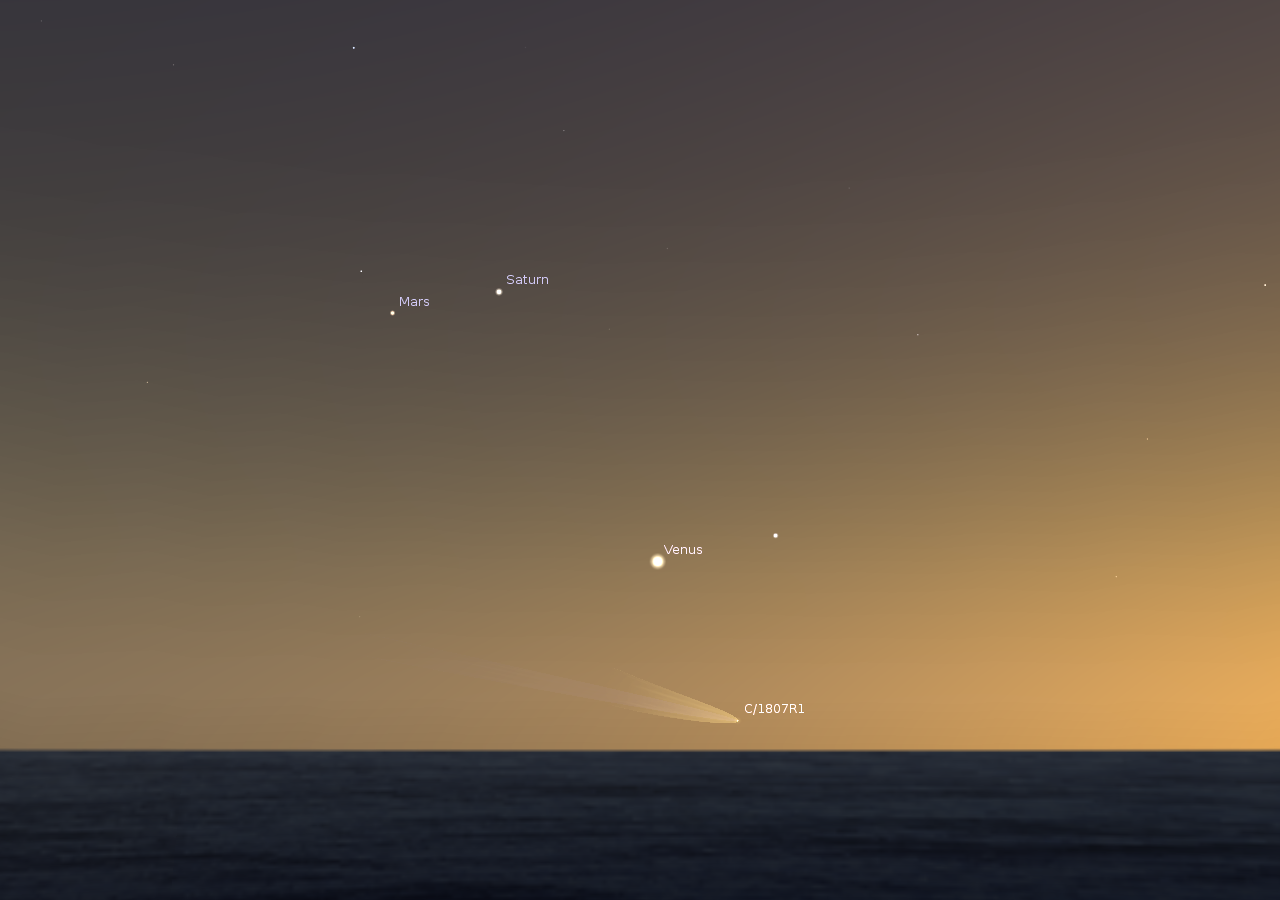
Artist’s depiction of the western sky slightly after sundown on 9 September 1807 in Sicily (view looking west over the Mediterranean)

Its discovery is often credited to the Augustinian friar P. Reggente Parisi at Castrogiovanni in Sicily. He recorded observing the comet very close to the horizon in the early twilight of 9 September 1807, not far from the equally bright star Spica: at that time the planets Venus, Mars and Saturn were also near the comet. Moonlight interfered with observations for the following week and thanks to his favorable southerly location, Parisi might have been able to make his discovery several days before a number of other observers in Europe independently discovered the comet.

Orbital data points suggest that the comet should have been first discovered by the unassisted eye in the southern hemisphere several weeks before it became visible in the northern hemisphere; however there are no such historical reports. In Australia the comet should have been visible during all of August in the early evening twilight on the western horizon with a brightness approaching magnitude 1.

=== Follow-up observations ===
Jean-Louis Pons, at Marseille, saw the comet in evening twilight on 21 September; shortly afterwards his colleague Jacques-Joseph Thulis (1768–1810) made the first positional determination for the comet in terms of the celestial coordinate system. Dunbar, in America, noted that the comet was first seen there "about the 20th September" and commented that the surveyor Seth Pease (1764–1819) began making observations on the 22nd. On 20 September the comet reached a brightness between magnitude 1 and 2.

In the following 10 days the comet was independently discovered by Jacques Vidal and Honoré Flaugergues in France, Edward Pigott in England, Johann Sigismund Gottfried Huth and Johann Friedrich Eule in Germany, and Gonzalez in Spain. The comet was also observed on 26 September by Francisco José de Caldas in New Granada (Colombia). Vidal estimated the length of the comet's tail to be between 7° and 8° in length.

Near the end of September, on its journey away from the Sun, the comet made its closest approach to Earth; it was visible to the naked eye throughout the month of October. On 1 October Johann Elert Bode reported a tail length of 5°. On 4 October Huth reported that the tail had split into a straight, 6°-degree long tail and a shorter, curved tail. Both tails were also seen on 20 October when Heinrich Wilhelm Olbers noted that the two tails were separated by 1.5°; the more northerly tail was very narrow, thin and straight and about 10° long, while the more southerly tail was broad, short and about 4.5° long.

A few days later, the two tails could no longer be distinguished from each other; in Natchez, Mississippi, Dunbar saw on 24 October only a single tail, which had a length of 2.7°. At the University of Göttingen, Johann Hieronymus Schroeter made accurate observational measurements of the comet from 4 October 1807 to 18 February 1808. The comet was observed from HMS Buffalo by Captain Philip Gidley King at Lat 15 degrees 4 minutes, Long 28 degrees 52 mins.

"Mon 5th Oct. A remarkable star seen for the 2nd time. It appeared from the West and had a bright luminous tail and considerable magnitude".

In November and December the comet was still visible to the naked eye, but its brightness had steadily diminished and by the end of November the tail was difficult to discern. On 20 November William Herschel estimated the length of the tail to be 2.5°, but in the beginning of December he could identify a short tail only in large refractor.

Amongst the observers of the comet was an elderly Charles Messier, who noted that:

"the comet became very beautiful, and stayed beautiful during a large number of days [...] it was marked in the sky by a nucleus of great luminosity which it enveloped, and from which came out a very clear, very extended tail".

Despite failing eyesight, Messier was able to make several telescopic observations of the comet.

From January 1808 there were no further naked-eye observations. Telescopic sightings of the comet were made on 19 February by Olbers, on 24 February by Friedrich Wilhelm Bessel, and on 28 February, after a long search, by Dunbar. The final telescopic observation was made by Vincent Wisniewsky in Saint Petersburg on 27 March 1808.

== Orbit ==
Using observations over 187 days Bessel computed an elongated orbit inclined about 63° to the ecliptic. At perihelion, which occurred on 19 September 1807 the comet was about 0.646 AU (96.6 million km) the Sun. The comet was on 11 September about 0.775 AU (115.9 million km) from Venus and on 15 September about 0.836 AU (125.1 million km) from Mars. On 26 September the comet made its closet approach to Earth at a distance of about 1.15 AU (172 million km); for a great comet this distance is unusually large; only two other known great comets failed to come closer than 1 AU to Earth – namely, the Great Comet of 1811 and Comet Hale-Bopp.

At the time of the discovery of C/1881 K1, also known as the Great Comet of 1881, its discoverer John Tebbutt initially considered the possibility that it was a return of the 1807 comet due to apparent orbital similarities between the two.

== Scientific importance ==
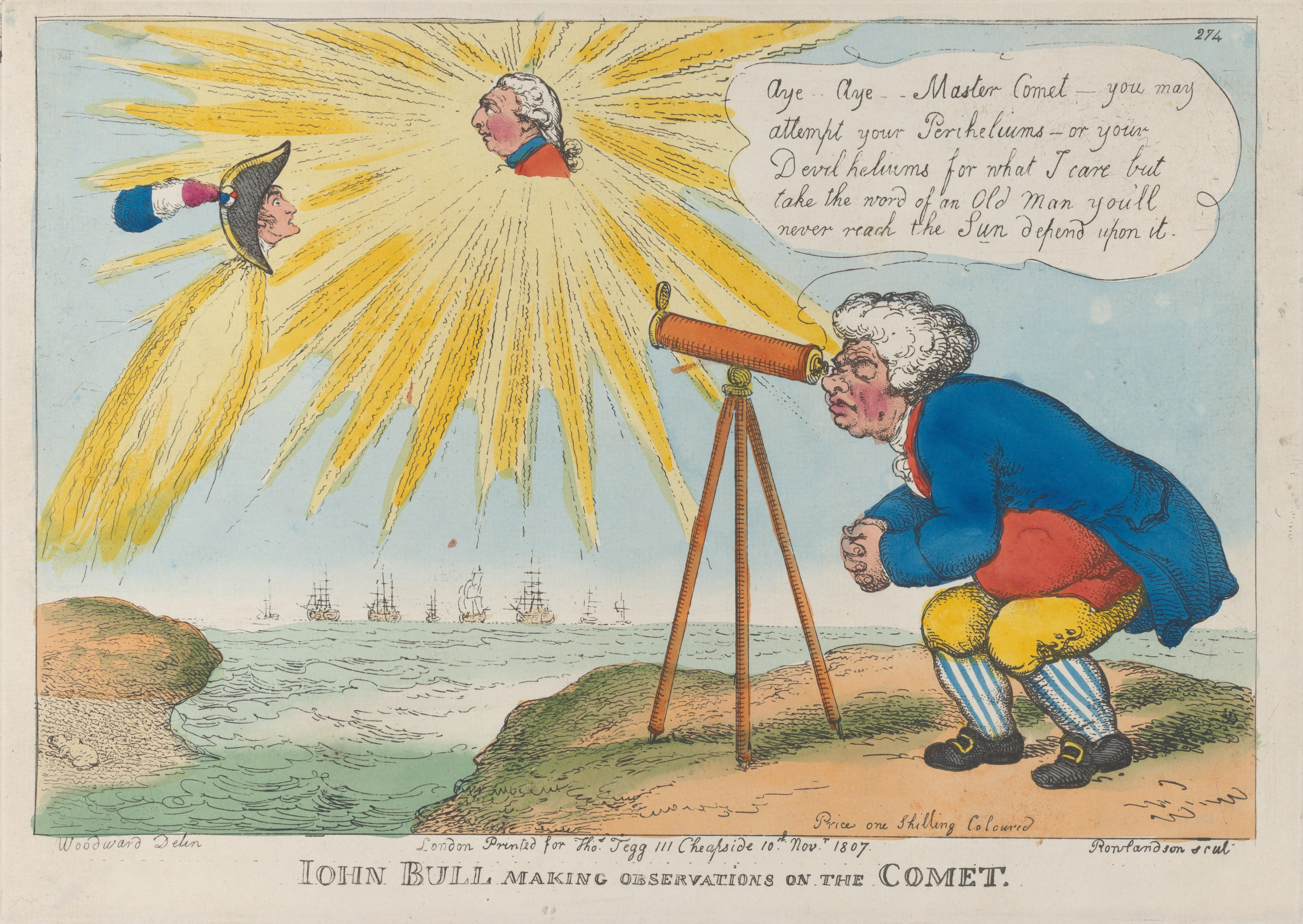
John Bull making observations on the Comet

In October 1807, Bode, Johann Karl Burckhardt and Francis Triesnecker calculated estimates of a parabolic orbit for the comet. Initially Bessel also calculated a parabolic orbit, but additional observations enabled him to calculate an elliptic orbit. Since this estimate of an elliptic orbit still did not agree with the observations to Bessel's satisfaction, he developed a novel method for calculating the orbital elements. Bessel's method took into account the changing gravitational influences of the Sun and planets near to the comet and made better use of the observational data by means of a least squares estimation technique developed a few years earlier by Carl Friedrich Gauss.

For this comet there were observational data for over six months and thus for a significant part of the cometary orbit Bessel's calculated predictions could be compared to the observations. The great comet of 1807 is the first long-period comet (other than Halley's Comet, which was already known to be periodic) for which there is empirical verification that it moves in an elliptical, and not in a parabolic, orbit.
