= Australian one-hundred-dollar note =

Current denomination of Australian currency

One hundred dollars
- Country: Australia
- Value: 100 Australian dollars
- Width: 158 mm
- Height: 65 mm
- Security features: Clear window with embossing, micro printing, slightly raised printing, hold the note towards light and the Australian coat of arms plus a seven pointed star will appear, ultraviolet, Unic serial number and different fonts, watermark
- Material used: Polymer
- Years of printing: 1996, 1998–99, 2008, 2010–11, 2013–14, 2017, 2019–21, 2023

Obverse
- Design: Dame Nellie Melba
- Designer: emerystudios
- Design date: 29 October 2020

Reverse
- Design: General Sir John Monash
- Designer: emerystudios
- Design date: 29 October 2020

The Australian one-hundred-dollar note was first issued in 1984 as a paper note. There have been two different issues of this denomination: initially a very light turquoise-blue paper note, and from May 1996, a green polymer note. Since the start of issue there have been six signature combinations. Two other combinations were not issued.

== Design ==
=== Initial rollout of decimal currency ===
There was no one-hundred-dollar note released as part of the initial rollout of decimal currency in 1966, but inflation necessitated its introduction eighteen years later in 1984.

=== 1984–1996 ===
The paper issue was released on Monday 31 March 1984, has a portrait of Antarctic explorer Sir Douglas Mawson, with a background of a mountain range with a geological strata format. A large diamond shape appears to the left of the main picture. Astronomer John Tebbutt is on the reverse, with a background of the observatory he built and a local church.

The original paper 100-dollar note.
Obverse	Reverse

=== 1996–2020 ===
The polymer issue was released on Wednesday 15 May 1996, designed by Bruce Stewart, and features portraits of soprano Dame Nellie Melba and engineer and First World War general Sir John Monash, along with images from the First World War and John Simpson Kirkpatrick and his donkey.

1996–2020 polymer note—obverse

1996–2020 polymer note—reverse

=== 2020–present ===
On 27 September 2012, the Reserve Bank of Australia announced that Australia's banknotes would be upgraded in the coming years as of the Reserve Bank's Next Generation Banknote Program. On 24 February 2020, the Reserve Bank of Australia unveiled the design of the new $100 banknote, after earlier releasing updated versions of all other banknotes denominations in previous years. The note features updated security features, and was released into circulation on Thursday 29 October 2020.

The new banknote, as with the previously released denominations in the Next Generation Banknote Program, includes representations of Australian flora and fauna. The featured flora and fauna are the Australian Masked Owl and the Golden Wattle. The golden wattle is Australia's national floral emblem. A new tactile feature has been included to help people who are blind or have low vision to distinguish between denominations.

== Security features ==
The paper design includes a watermark of Captain James Cook in the white field, and a metallic strip embedded in the paper to the left (on the obverse side) of the note. The same watermark was used in the last issue of the pre-decimal banknotes.

The polymer issue includes a shadow image of the Australian Coat of Arms, which is printed over. In the clear window, there is embossing—or a raised image—of the number 100 and a print of a lyrebird. Also for this issue, fluorescent colouring was added to the serial numbers, as well as a patch that shows the banknote's value under ultraviolet light. The star's four points on the obverse and three on the reverse join to form the seven-pointed Federation Star when the note is held up to the light. Raised print and micro-printing of the denomination value are also included.

== Circulation ==
According to Reserve Bank of Australia statistics, the number of $100 banknotes in circulation in June 2005 was 149 million—18.5% of all notes in circulation. The cash value for these notes was $14,924 million—41.9% of the total value for all denominations. Only the $50 note had more cash value in circulation. In June 2008 there were 176.9 million notes in circulation (19%), with a value of $17,690 million (42.1%).

In June 2017, 337 million $100 notes were in circulation, 22% of the total notes in circulation; worth $33,689 million, 46% of the total value for all denominations.

In December 2016 it was reported that Australia considered abolishing its $100 note as an effort to close loopholes used by the black economy. However, the Reserve Bank of Australia officially stated that there are no plans to abolish the $100 note.
