= V728 Scorpii =

Nova seen in 1862

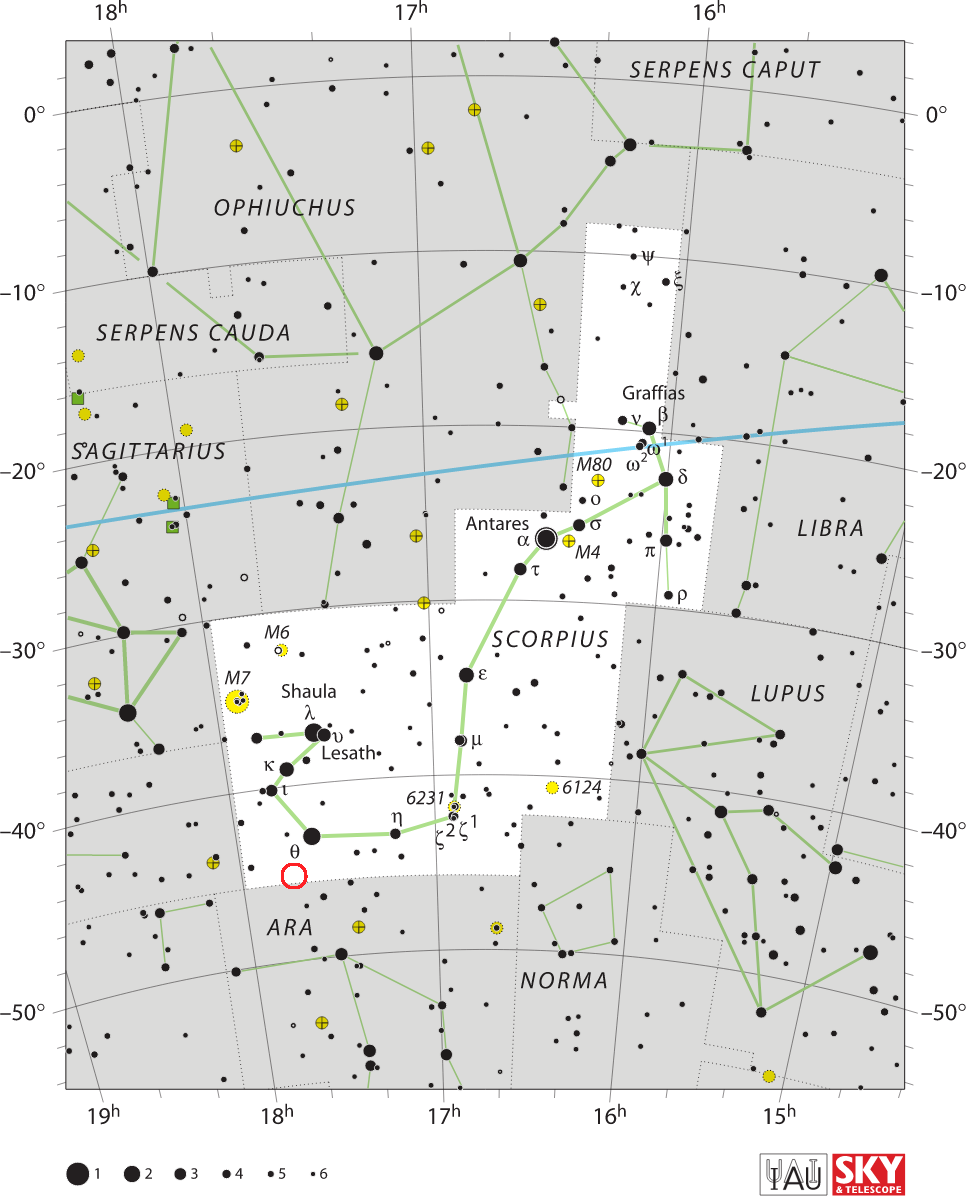
- Location of V728 Scorpii (circled in red)

Observation data Epoch J2000 Equinox ICRS
- Constellation: Scorpius
- Right ascension: 17^{h} 39^{m} 13.239^{s}
- Declination: −45° 28′ 45.68″
- Apparent magnitude (V): 5.0 - 21

Characteristics
- Variable type: Nova and eclipsing

Astrometry
Proper motion (μ)	RA: −9.805 mas/yr Dec.: −13.978 mas/yr
Parallax (π)	0.4761±0.1257 mas
Distance	approx. 7,000 ly (approx. 2,100 pc)

Other designations
- Nova Sco 1862, Gaia DR2 5949183467703297920, AAVSO 1731-45

Database references
SIMBAD	data

V728 Scorpii, also known as Nova Scorpii 1862, was a nova that occurred in the constellation of Scorpius. It was discovered on 4 October 1862 by John Tebbutt, an astronomer living in New South Wales, Australia, while observing a comet. He reported that the star was in the constellation Ara. At the time of its discovery, the nova had an apparent magnitude of 5, making it visible to the unaided eye. Nine days later, it faded below 11th magnitude, indicating that it was a very fast nova.

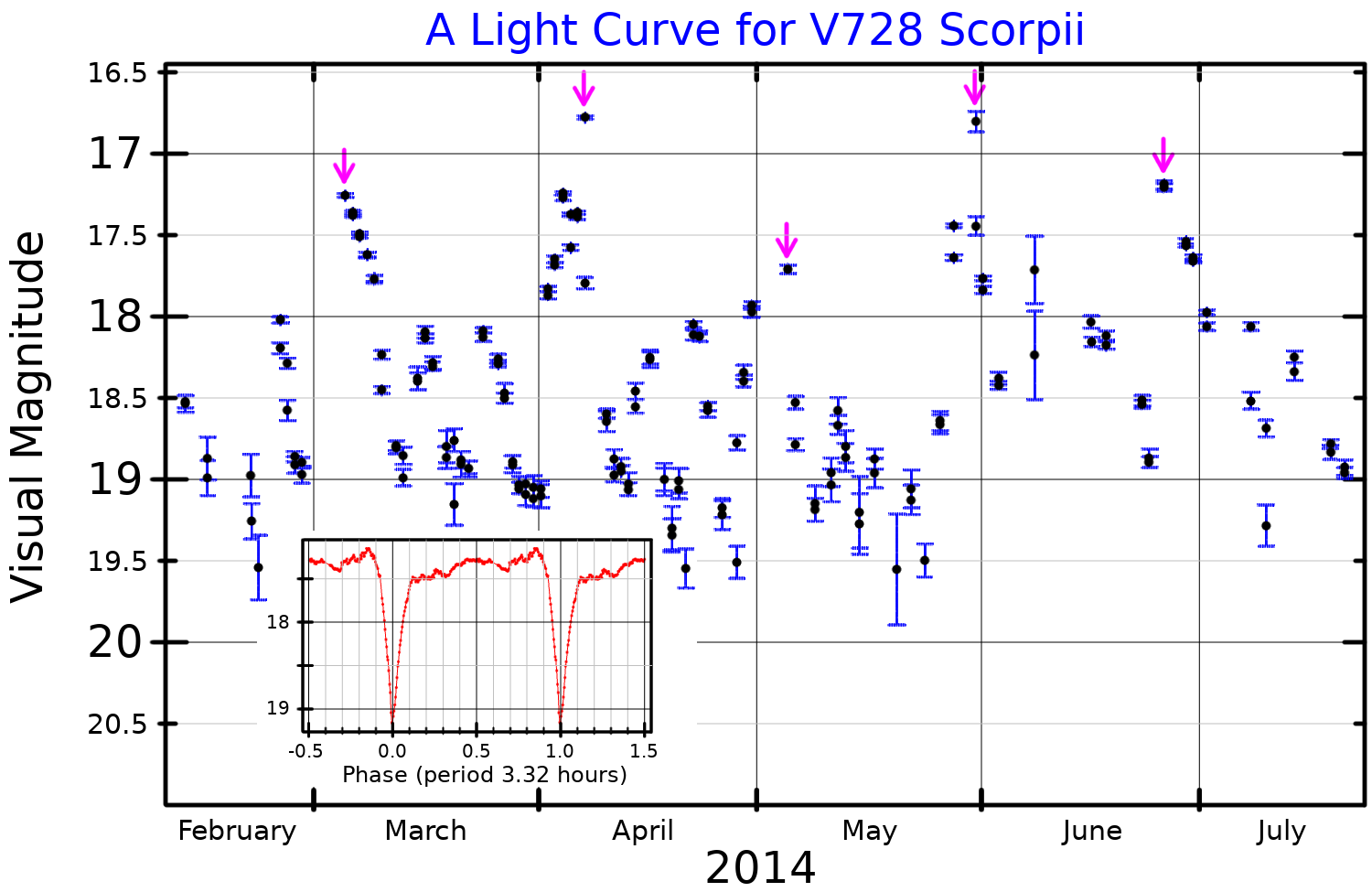
A visual band light curve for V728 Scorpii. The main plot shows the long-term variation with arrows pointing to the stunted outbursts which occur every ~30 days. The inset plot shows the variation caused by the eclipses. Adapted from Vogt et al. (2018) and Tappert et al. (2013).

Tappert et al. conducted an observing program from 2009 to 2011 to investigate nova candidates. Using photometric and spectroscopic observations, they identified the post-nova star corresponding to Nova Scorpii 1862. On 20 May 2009, the star had a visible-band magnitude of 18.5. They reported that the spectrum resembled that of a dwarf nova with a high orbital inclination, suggesting that it might be an eclipsing variable. Follow-up observations by the same team found that V728 Scorpii was indeed an eclipsing system. All novae are binary stars, in a very close orbit with a "donor" star transferring material to a white dwarf companion. The eclipses in this system appear to be eclipses of the accretion disk surrounding the white dwarf, rather than either star. The orbital period is 3.32 hours.
