= Agiabampo =

- Location within Sonora
- Coordinates: 27°11′41″N 109°32′31″W
- Country: Mexico
- State: Sonora
- Municipality: Huatabampo
- Elevation: 66 m (217 ft)

Population (2010)
  - Total: 409
- Time zone: UTC−7 (MST)
  - Summer (DST): UTC-7 (No DST)

Agiabampo is a hamlet of Huatabampo Municipality, located in the south of Mexican state of Sonora. According to data from the census of Population and Housing conducted in 2010 by the National Institute of Statistics and Geography (INEGI), Agiabampo has a total of 409 inhabitants.
