= Trouvelot (lunar crater) =

Crater on the Moon

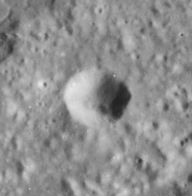
- Lunar Orbiter 4 image
- Coordinates: 49.3°N 5.8°E
- Diameter: 9 km
- Depth: 1.2 km
- Colongitude: 354° at sunrise
- Eponym: Étienne L. Trouvelot

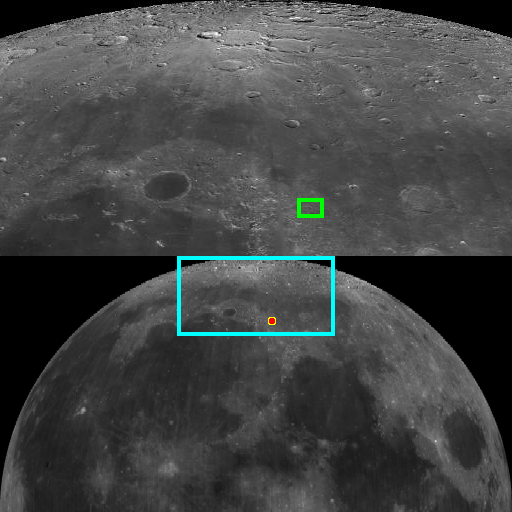
Location of the lunar crater Trouvelot

Trouvelot is a lunar impact crater located to the south of the Mare Frigoris. It was named after the French astronomer Étienne Trouvelot. It is a bowl-shaped formation with a higher albedo than its surroundings. The rim is roughly circular, but somewhat uneven. It has not been significantly eroded by subsequent impacts. The crater lies less than 10 kilometers to the south of the Vallis Alpes canyon formation.

== Satellite craters ==
By convention these features are identified on lunar maps by placing the letter on the side of the crater midpoint that is closest to Trouvelot.

Trouvelot	Latitude	Longitude	Diameter
G	47.5° N	0.4° E	5 km
H	49.8° N	4.5° E	5 km
