= Trouvelot (Martian crater) =

Trouvelot Crater
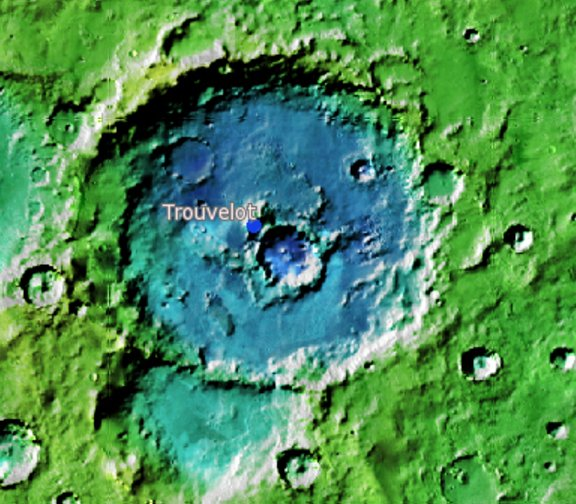
- Topographic map of the location of Trouvelot Crater
- Planet: Mars
- Coordinates: 16.2°N 13.1°W
- Quadrangle: Oxia Palus
- Diameter: 148.77 km (92.44 mi)
- Eponym: Étienne Léopold Trouvelot, a French astronomer (1827–1895)

Trouvelot is a crater on Mars, located in the Oxia Palus quadrangle at 16.2° north latitude and 13.1° west longitude near the crustal dichotomy in the circum-Chryse region. It is roughly located along the dichotomy between Arabia Terra to the northeast and the southernmost of the circum-Chryse outflow channels to the southwest. Trouvelot crater measures approximately 148.77 kilometres (92.44 mi) in diameter and was named after Étienne Léopold Trouvelot, a French astronomer (1827–1895). The name was adopted by IAU's Working Group for Planetary System Nomenclature in 1973.

== Description ==
Impact craters generally have a rim with ejecta around them, in contrast volcanic craters usually do not have a rim or ejecta deposits. As craters get larger (greater than 10 km or 6.2 mi in diameter) they usually have a central peak. The peak is caused by a rebound of the crater floor following the impact.

There is a part of Trouvelot that displays many thin, light-toned layers; these may be evidence that a lake was present in the past. Many craters once contained lakes. Because some crater floors show deltas, we know that water had to be present for some time. Dozens of deltas have been spotted on Mars. Deltas form when sediment is washed in from a stream entering a quiet body of water. The presence of a delta means water was there for a time, maybe for many years. Primitive organisms may have developed in such lakes; hence, some craters may be prime targets for the search for evidence of life on Mars.

Many places on Mars show rocks arranged in layers. Rock can form layers in a variety of ways. Volcanoes, wind, or water can produce layers. Sometimes the layers are of different colors. Light-toned rocks on Mars have been associated with hydrated minerals like sulfates. The Mars rover Opportunity examined such layers close-up with several instruments. Some layers are probably made up of fine particles because they seem to break up into fine dust. Other layers break up into large boulders, so they are probably much harder. Basalt, a volcanic rock, is thought to be present in the layers that form boulders. Basalt has been identified on Mars in many places. Instruments on orbiting spacecraft have detected clay (also called phyllosilicate) in some layers. Recent research with an orbiting near-infrared spectrometer, which reveals the types of minerals present based on the wavelengths of light they absorb, found evidence of layers of both clay and sulfates in many places, especially craters. This is exactly what would appear if a large lake had slowly evaporated. Moreover, since some layers contain gypsum, a sulfate which forms in relatively fresh water, life could have formed in some craters.

Scientists are excited about finding hydrated minerals such as sulfates and clays on Mars because they are usually formed in the presence of water. Places that contain clays and/or other hydrated minerals would be good places to look for evidence of life.

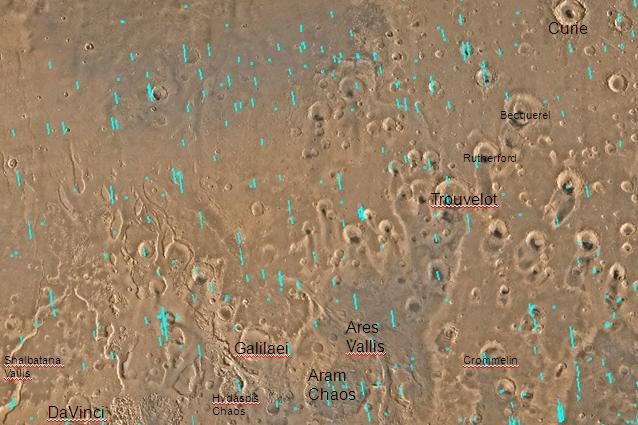
Quadrangle map of Oxia Palus labeled with major features. This quadrangle contains many collapsed areas of chaos and many outflow channels (old river valleys).

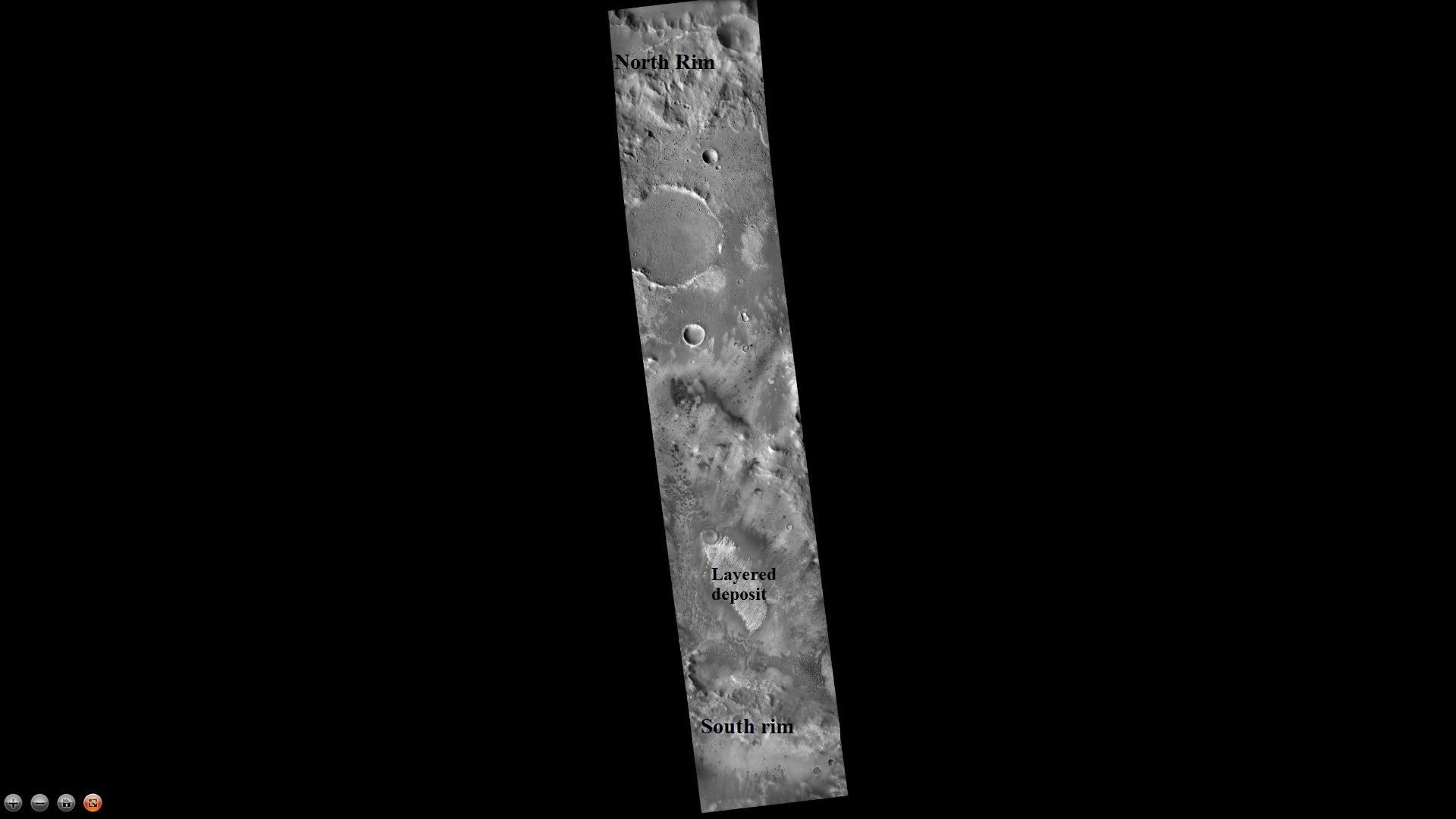
Trouvelot Crater, as seen by CTX camera (on Mars Reconnaissance Orbiter). Major features are labeled.

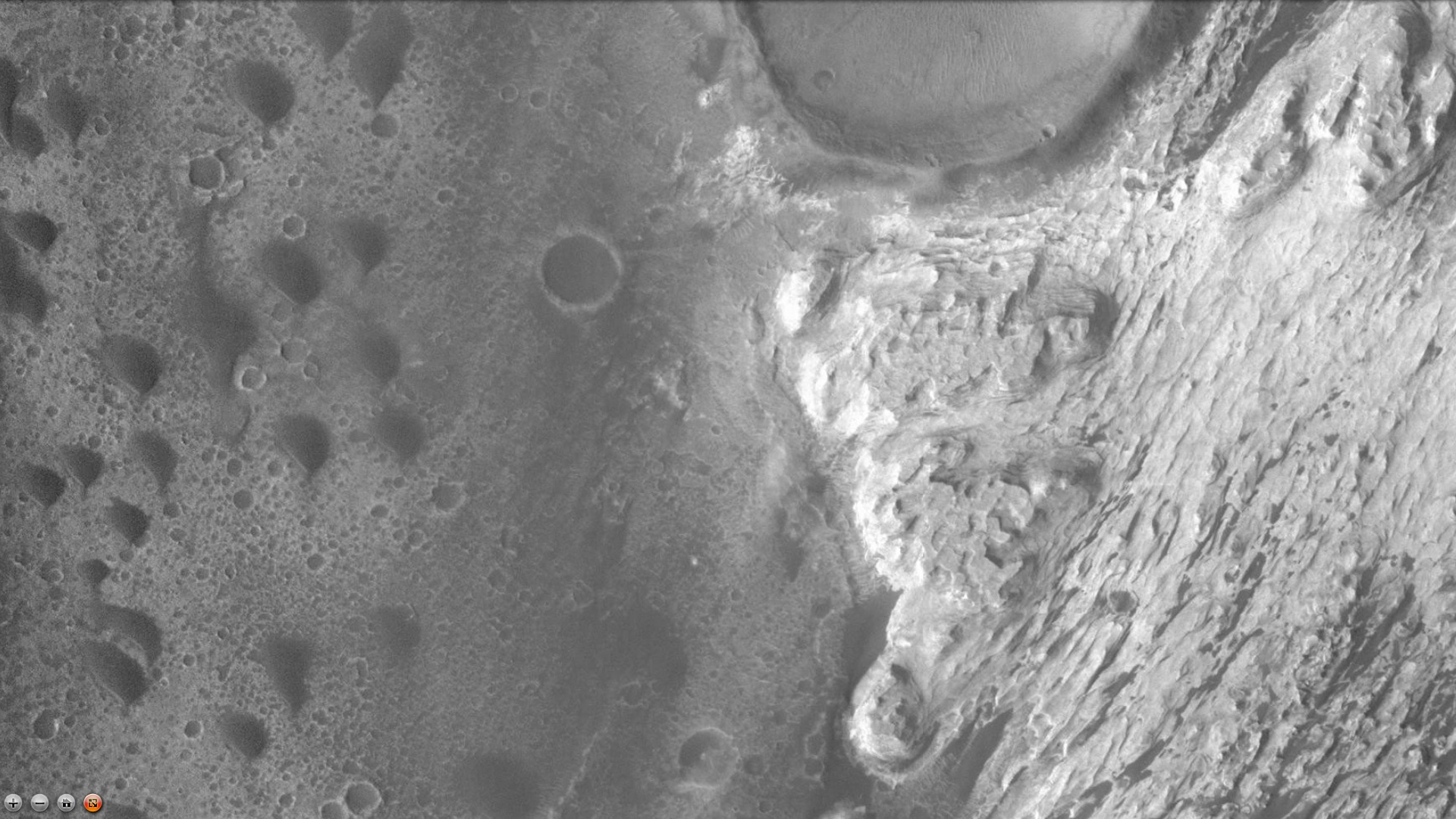
Layers in mound in Trouvelot Crater, as seen by CTX camera (on Mars Reconnaissance Orbiter). Note: this is an enlargement of the previous image.

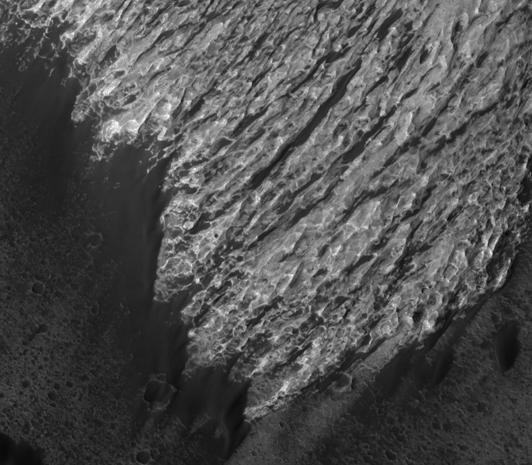
Trouvelot Crater floor, as seen by HiRISE.

== See also ==
- List of craters on Mars
