= C/1861 J1 (Tebbutt) =

Great Comet of 1861

C/1861 J1 (Tebbutt) (Great Comet of 1861)
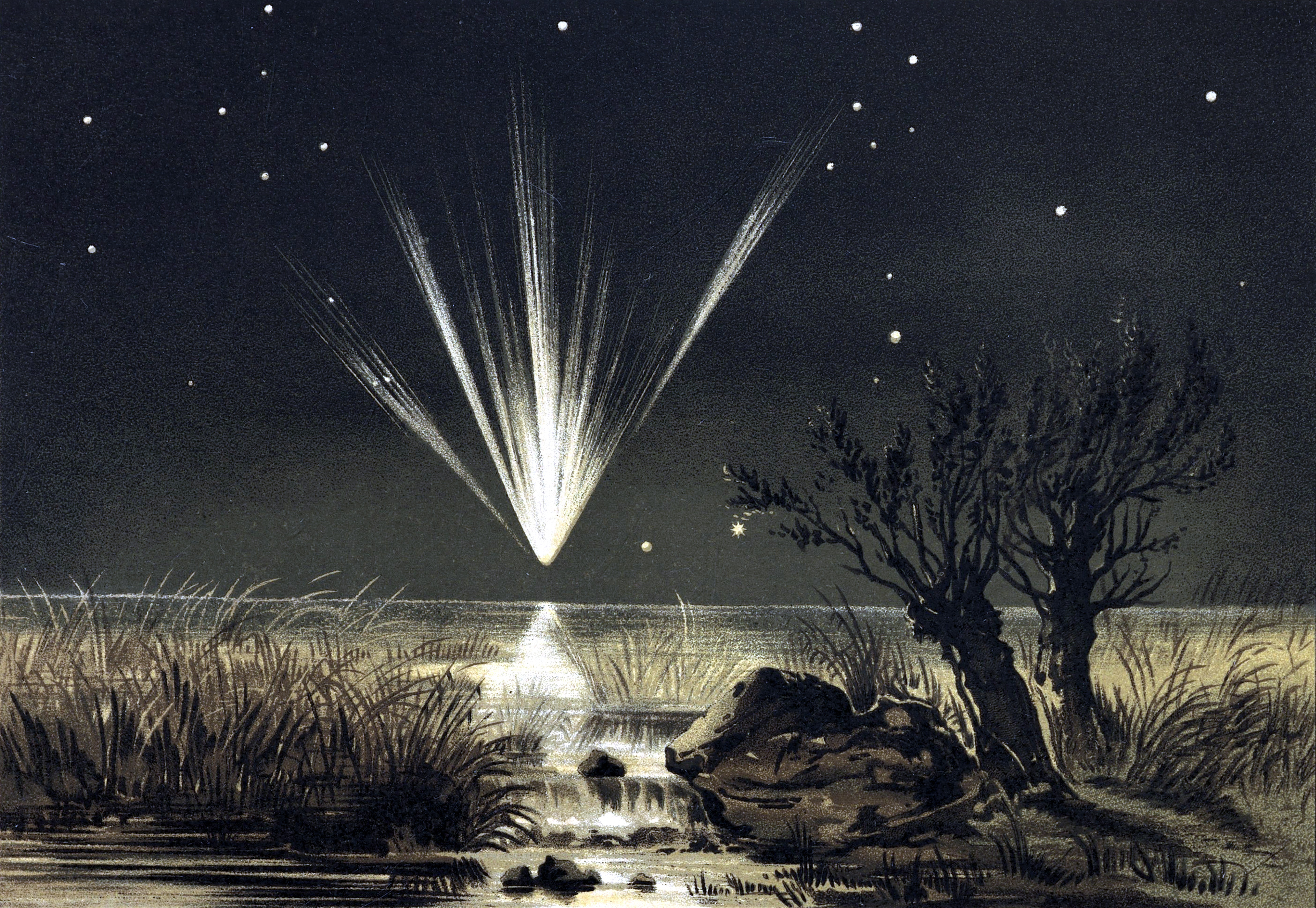
- Drawing of the Great Comet of 1861 by Edmund Weiss in his book Bilderatlas der Sternenwelt (1888)

Discovery
- Discovered by: John Tebbutt
- Discovery site: Windsor, Australia
- Discovery date: 13 May 1861

Designations
- MPC designation: C/1500 H1, C/1861 J1
- Alternative designations: 1500 I, 1861 II

Orbital characteristics
- Epoch: 25 May 1861 (JD 2400920.5)
- Observation arc: 362 years
- Earliest precovery date: 7 May 1500
- Number of observations: 2,362
- Aphelion: 109.34 AU
- Perihelion: 0.822 AU (1861); 0.829 AU (2267)
- Semi-major axis: 55.083 AU
- Eccentricity: 0.98507
- Orbital period: 364.96±0.51 years
- Inclination: 85.442°
- Longitude of ascending node: 280.91°
- Argument of periapsis: 330.08°
- Mean anomaly: –0.043°
- Last perihelion: 12 June 1861
- Next perihelion: 2265–2267
- T_{Jupiter}: 0.183

Physical characteristics
- Comet total magnitude (M1): 0.5–2.7 (1500); 3.9 (1861)
- Apparent magnitude: –2.0 (1861 apparition)

The Great Comet of 1861, formally designated as C/1861 J1 and 1861 II, is a long-period comet that was visible to the naked eye for approximately 3 months. It was categorized as a great comet—one of the eight brightest comets of the 19th century.

== Discovery and observations ==
It was discovered by John Tebbutt of Windsor, New South Wales, Australia, on May 13, 1861, with an apparent magnitude of +4, a month before perihelion (June 12). It was not visible in the northern hemisphere until June 29, but it arrived before word of the comet's discovery.

On June 29, 1861, Comet C/1861 J1 passed 11.5 degrees (23 Sun-widths) from the Sun. On the following day, June 30, 1861, the comet made its closest approach to the Earth at a distance of 0.1326 AU (19.84 million km; 12.33 million mi). During the Earth close approach, the comet was estimated to be between magnitude 0 and −2 with a tail of over 90 angular degrees. As a result of forward scattering, C/1861 J1 even cast shadows at night (Schmidt 1863). During the night of June 30 – July 1, 1861, the famed comet observer J. F. Julius Schmidt watched in awe as the great comet C/1861 J1 cast shadows on the walls of the Athens Observatory. The comet may have interacted with the Earth in an almost unprecedented way. For two days, when the comet was at its closest, the Earth was actually within the comet's tail, and streams of cometary material converging towards the distant nucleus could be seen.

By the middle of August, the comet was no longer visible to the naked eye, but it was visible in telescopes until May 1862.

== Orbit ==
=== Previous apparitions ===
An elliptical orbit with a period of about 409 years was calculated by Heinrich Kreutz for his doctorate dissertation in 1880, which would indicate a previous appearance about the middle of the 15th century, and a return in the 23rd century. In 1995, Ichiro Hasegawa and Shuichi Nakano suggest that this comet (based on 5 observations) is identical with C/1500 H1, which was first observed on 7 May 1500. Further calculations by Branham in 2014 later refined the comet's orbital period into 364.96±0.51 years, taking planetary perturbations into account, which further supported the link that the comets of 1500 and 1861 were indeed the same object.

It was also hypothesized that C/1861 G1 (Thatcher) and this comet are related, and that in a previous perihelion, Thatcher broke off from Tebbutt, as the two comets have many similar orbital characteristics. However in 2015, Richard L. Branham Jr. disproved this by using modern computing technology and statistical analysis to calculate a corrected orbit for C/1861 J1.

By 1992, Tebbutt's comet had traveled more than 100 AU (15 billion km) from the Sun, making it even farther away than the dwarf planet Eris. It will come to aphelion around 2063.

=== Return ===
Computing the barycentric orbital period of the comet when it is outside the planetary region (using an epoch of 1900) shows an orbital period of about 406 years which would give a return year of 2267. Propagating the orbit forward also gives a return to perihelion around the year 2267.

== Tebbutt's account ==
In his Astronomical Memoirs, Tebbutt gave an account of his discovery:

... On the evening of May 13, 1861, while searching the western sky for comets, I detected a faint nebulous object near the star Lacaille 1316 in the constellation Eridanus. In my marine telescope the object appeared much diffused, and it was with the greatest difficulty that I estimated its distance from three well known fixed stars. The object was hardly distinguishable in the small telescope attached to the sextant, and I found it necessary to employ a coloured glass between the index and horizon glasses, for the superior brilliance of the reference stars Procyon, Sirius, and Canopus, when they were brought into the field of view, quite extinguished its feeble light. The measurements gave R.A. = 3 h. 54 m. 12 s. Declin. = –30° 44′ as the place of the object at 6 h. 57 m. local mean time. Every comet hunter knows how necessary it is to the carrying out of his work to have at hand a copious catalogue of nebulae, but this valuable adjunct I unfortunately did not possess. I could not, however, find the object in the limited catalogues at my command. I accordingly made up my mind to watch it, and it is well that I did so, otherwise I should have missed one of the best opportunities for introducing myself to the astronomical world. ...

== Observations in writing ==
=== June 30, 1861 ===
Raphael Semmes, commander of the CSS Sumter wrote of the June 30 escape of his vessel from New Orleans:

The evening of the escape of the Sumter was one of those Gulf evenings, which can only be felt, and not described. The wind died gently away, as the sun declined, leaving a calm, and sleeping sea, to reflect a myriad of stars. The sun had gone down behind a screen of purple, and gold, and to add to the beauty of the scene, as night set in, a blazing comet, whose tail spanned nearly a quarter of the heavens, mirrored itself within a hundred feet of our little bark, as she ploughed her noiseless way through the waters.

Samuel Elliott Hoskins, a doctor from Guernsey, observed:

At 9 p.m. a large luminous disc surrounded by a nebulous haze became visible in the N.W. horizon. At 9.40 it unmistakably assumed the character, to the naked eye, of a comet, having a large nucleus & a fan-like tail projecting vertically towards the zenith. It was permanently brilliant until sunrise the next morning − travelling with apparent rapidity, but slight declination, from N.W. to N.E.

Kate Stone, American diarist noted from northeast Louisiana:

There is a comet visible tonight. We were surprised to see it, as we did not know it was expected. Have seen nothing of it in the papers. It is not very bright but has the appearance of a large star, Venus at her brightest, with a long train of light seen dimly as through a mist. Jimmy first discovered it. Two splendid meteors fell just above it, and the boys said it was a big star chased by little ones trying to regain its orbit.

=== July 1, 1861 ===
Granville Stuart noted the observation of this comet in a journal entry on July 1, 1861, while living in western Montana:

Saw a huge comet last night in the northwest. Its tail reached half across the heavens. It has probably been visible for sometime, but as it has been cloudy lately I had not observed it before.

Sarah R. Espy, of Alabama, in her private journal:

Light rains this morning, I went with Mrs. Brewer, to visit Mrs. Hampton. O. busy, preparing C. to attend a camp-drill of some weeks above here. A brilliant and beautiful comet appeared tonight in the same part of the heavens as that a few years ago, the train of this it the longest that I ever saw, pointing directly upwards.

Emily Holder, wife of Joseph Bassett Holder, while stationed at Fort Jefferson, Florida:

Its appearance was sublime, as it extended over nearly half of the heavens...many wondered if the world was not coming to an end.

Martin Bienvenu, an officer on a ship at Bangkok, in his unpublished journal:

A very brilliant comet had been visible in the Northern sky during the preceding week. I measured its tail with a quadrant, the extreme length of which was 93 degrees 50 minutes.

=== July 2, 1861 ===
Raphael Semmes, commander of the CSS Sumter:

Day passed into night, and with the night came the brilliant comet again, lighting us on our way over the waste of waters. The morning of the second of July, our second day out, dawned clear, and beautiful, the Sumter still steaming in an almost calm sea, with nothing to impede her progress.

R.W. Haig, the Chief Astronomer of the 49th Parallel Boundary Commission in British Columbia, wrote in a letter home

We saw a large comet for the first time last night, although I have no doubt it has been seen some days earlier in England.

Charles Wilson, surveyor on the Boundary Commission with Haig, wrote

We caught sight of the Comet for the first time the night before last, to our great surprise as the lightness of the evenings had prevented our noticing his approach; he bids fair to eclipse the one of 1858 in size and splendour.

=== July 3, 1861 ===
Soldier at Fort Washington, MD recorded in his journal, "Comet very large, has been visible one week north of west." See exhibits at Fort Washington National Historical Park in Fort Washington, MD.

=== July 5, 1861 ===
James Riley Robinson, on the schooner Conchita, in the Mexican harbor of Agiabampo.

I awoke in the night at 1 o'clock, when I had a glorious sight of the largest comet I ever beheld. The head, or nucleus, was large as Venus, and very bright and blazing, and about 20 degrees above the horizon, pointed to the north, while the bright, long tail reached full half way across the heavens. It was a most wonderful sight.

=== July 7, 1861 ===
S. Watson, a tea inspector for the British firm Bull & Purdon writes from Hong Kong:

There is a very brilliant comet to be seen every evening as large as the one seen in England in 1858.

Sarah Lois Wadley, daughter of William Morrill Wadley who managed the Vicksburg, Shreveport and Texas Railroad and served as Confederate superintendent of railroads, writes in her diary from Vicksburg, Mississippi:

There has been a comet visible for some nights past, I went out to see it Friday night, it was very beautiful, but its brightness was beginning to wane. I was sorry that I had not been well enough to have seen it at first.
