= John Tebbutt =

19th and 20th-century Australian astronomer

John Tebbutt (25 May 1834 – 29 November 1916) was an Australian astronomer and meteorologist, famous for discovering the Great Comets of 1861 and 1881.

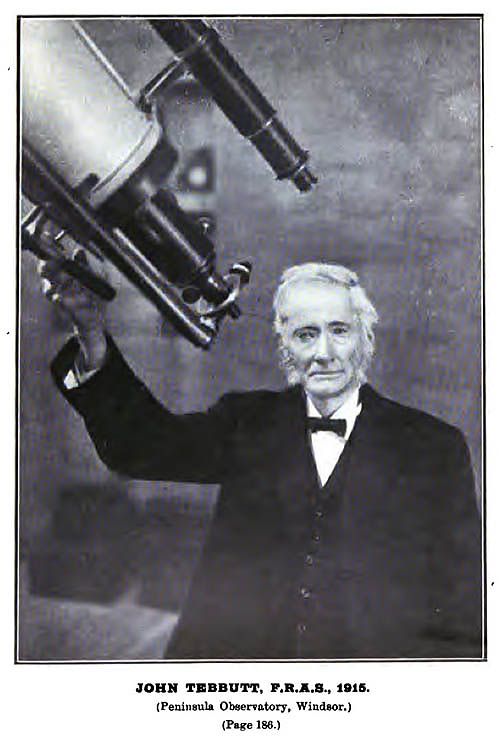
John Tebbutt at his observatory in 1915

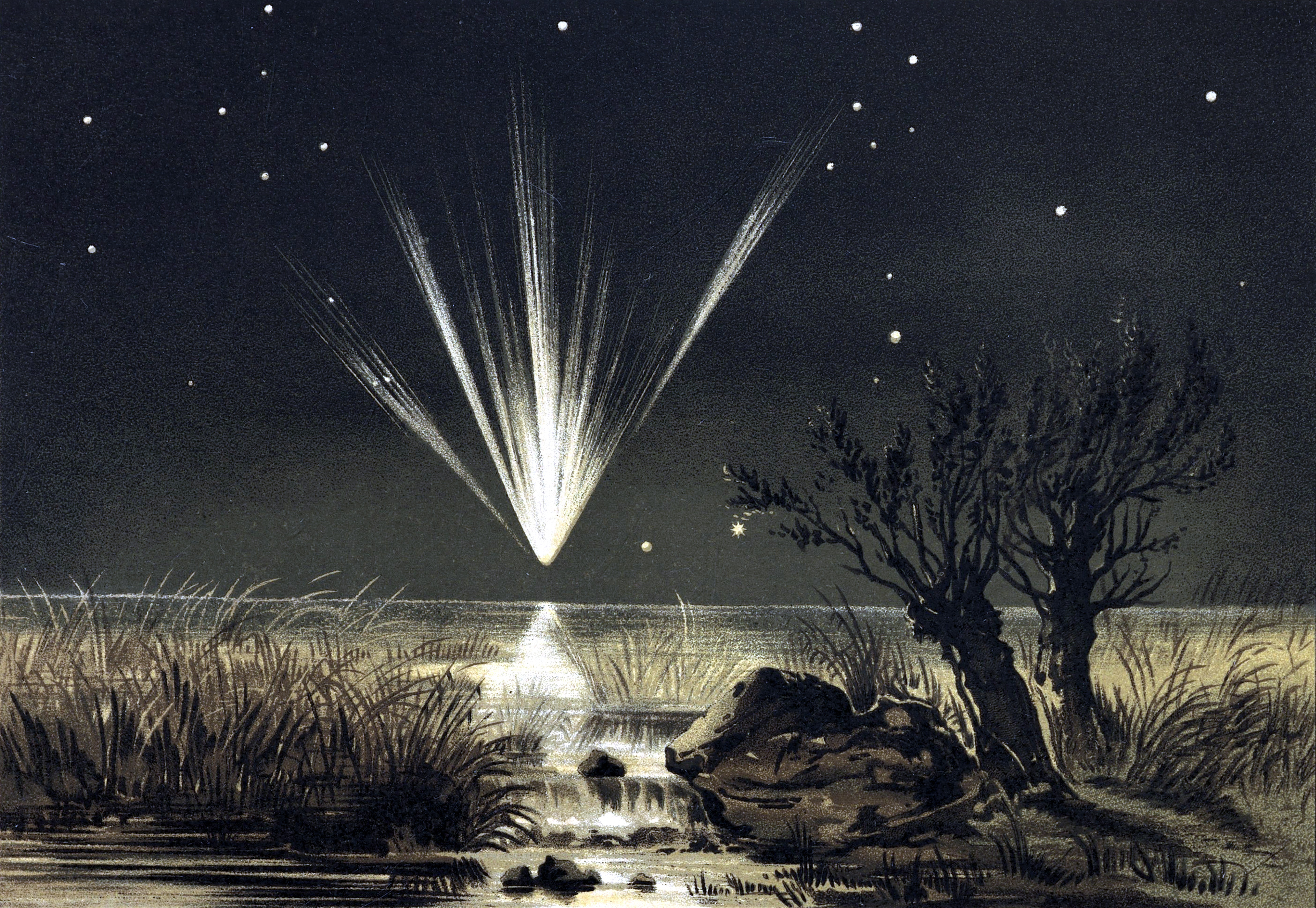
The Great Comet of 1861

Tebbutt also discovered Nova Scorpii 1862, a nova visible to the unaided eye.

== Observatory ==
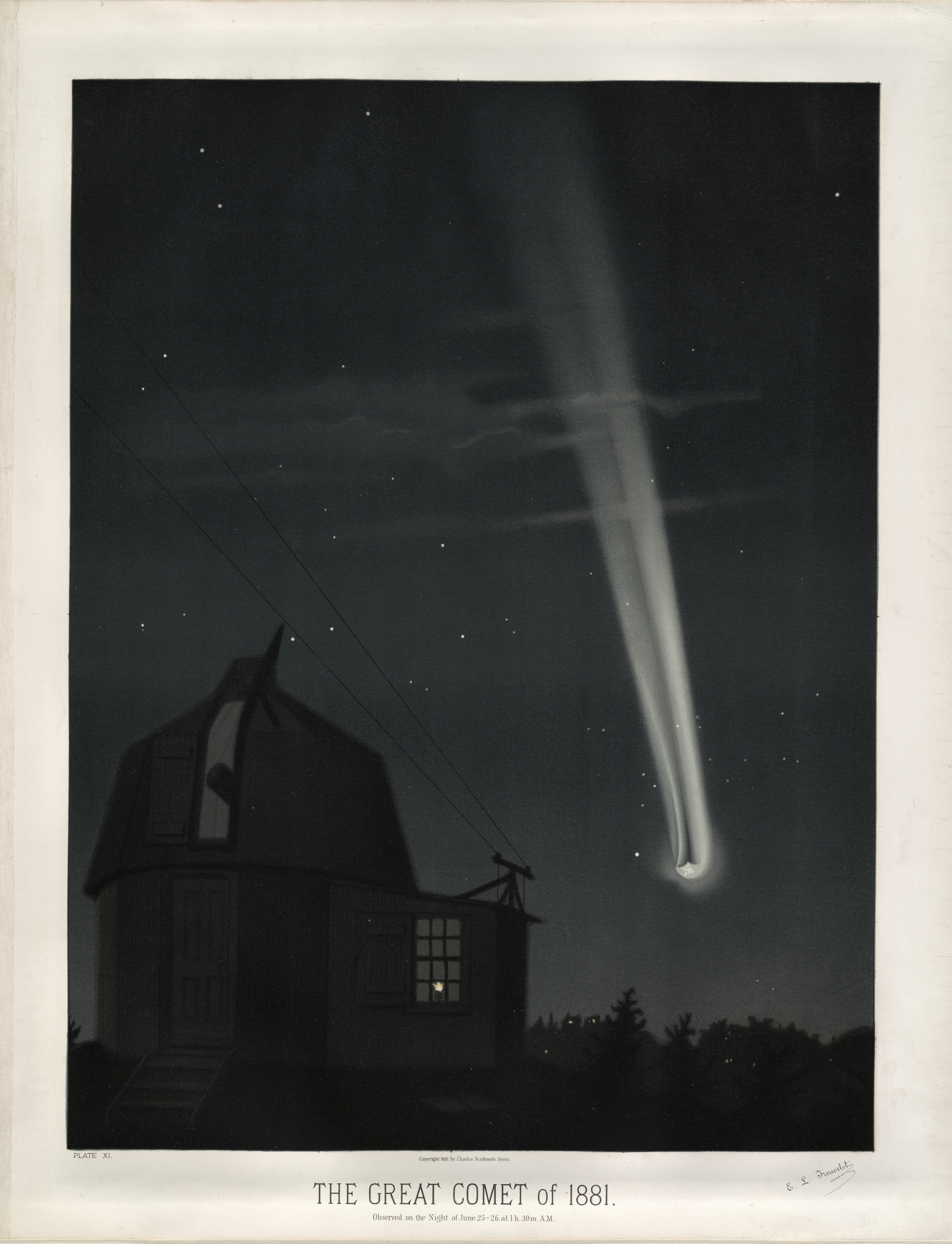
The great comet of 1881, chromolithograph by Trouvelot

Tebbutt received a Paris Exposition Silver Medal in 1867 in recognition of his paper On the Progress and Present State of Astronomical Science in New South Wales.

Between 1868 and 1902 he made 396 lunar occultation observations.

The year after his death, his son delivered John Tebbutt's working library and manuscripts to the State Library of New South Wales. The John Tebbutt Memorial Collection is made up of 3,676 printed volumes, 117 volumes of manuscripts and 235 pamphlets.

He was commemorated on the reverse side of the Australian one hundred-dollar note, in circulation 1984 until 1996 when it was replaced by a portrait of Sir John Monash.

An Australian $100 note, depicting John Tebbutt
