= Étienne Léopold Trouvelot =

American painter

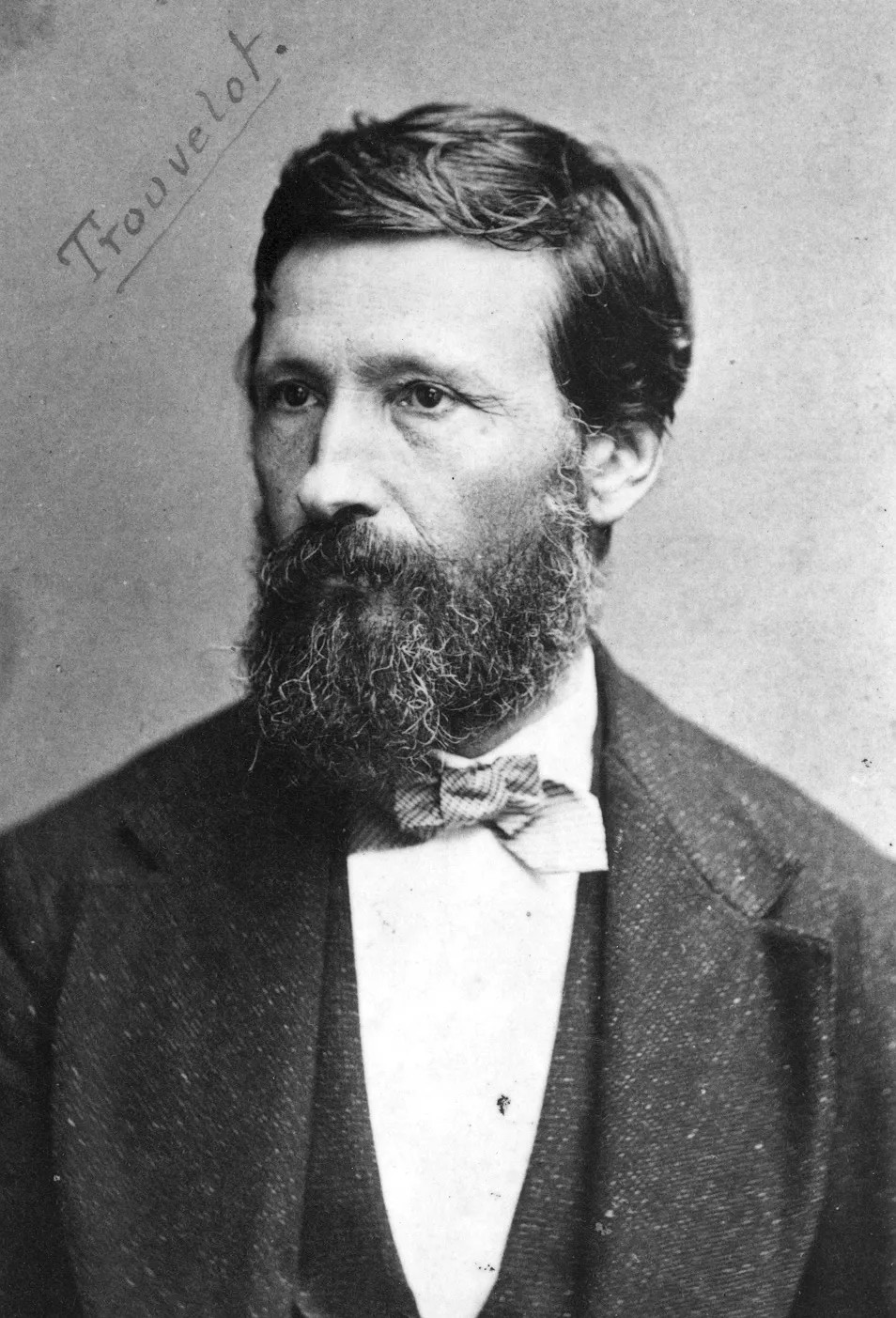
- Étienne Trouvelot, c. 1870
- Born: December 26, 1827; Aisne, France
- Died: April 22, 1895 (aged 67); Meudon, France
- Known for: Introducing the gypsy moth (a.k.a spongy moth) to North America
- Scientific career
- Fields: Astronomy

Signature
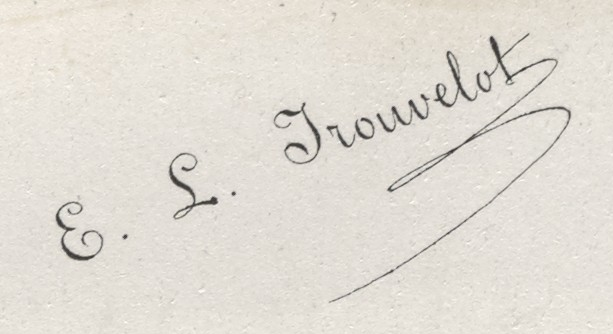

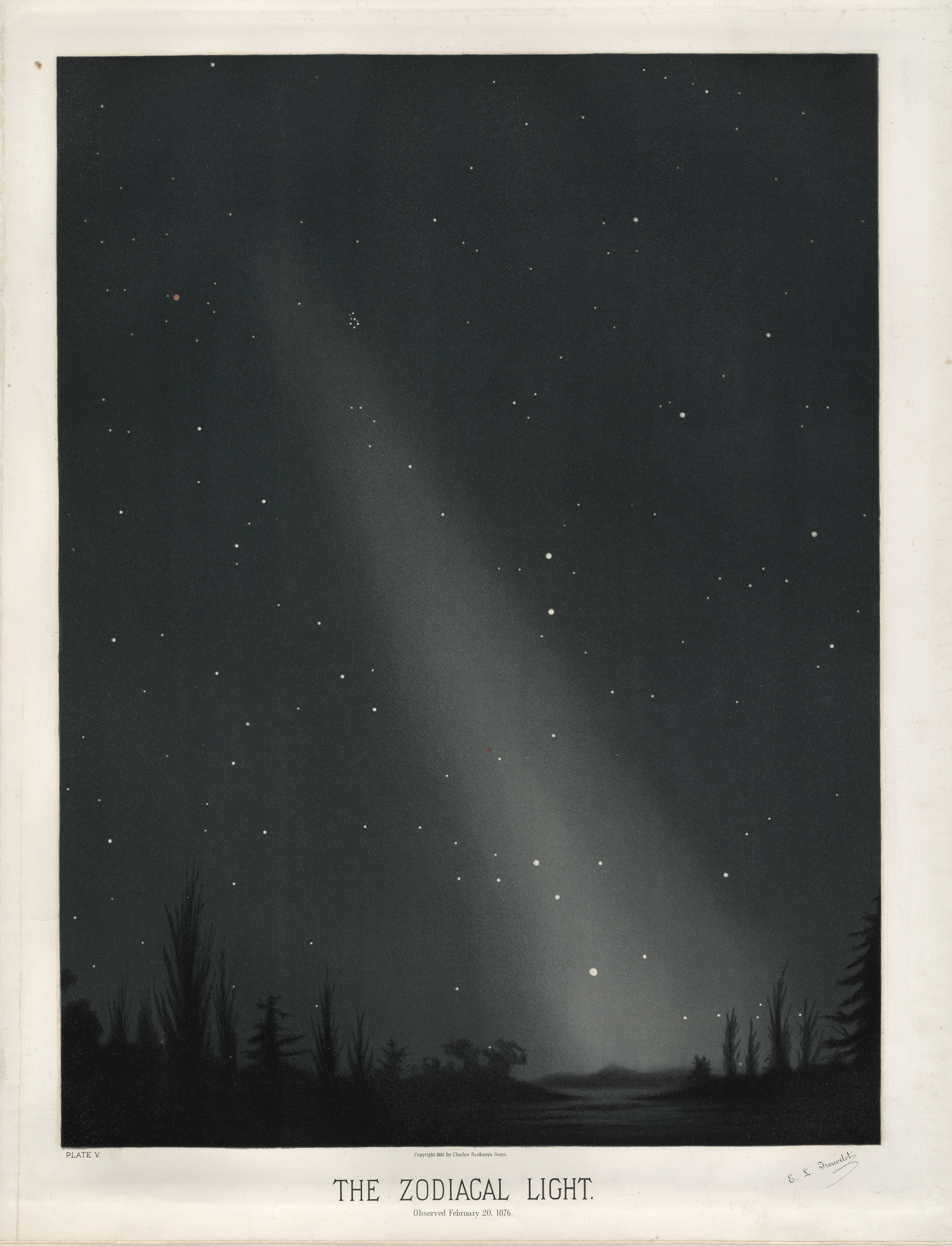
A Trouvelot lithograph depicting zodiacal light

Étienne Léopold Trouvelot (December 26, 1827 – April 22, 1895) was a French artist, astronomer and amateur entomologist. He is noted for the import and release of the gypsy moth, also known as the spongy moth, into North America. The spread of the moths as an invasive species has resulted in damage to millions of trees throughout the eastern United States.

== Biography ==
Trouvelot was born at Aisne, France. Little is known about his early life, although it is possible he was a republican and anti-royalist. Following a coup d'état by Louis-Napoleon Bonaparte in 1851, he fled with his family to the United States. They settled in the town of Medford, Massachusetts, a suburb of Boston, at the address of 27 Myrtle St. There he supported himself and his family as an artist and astronomer.

Trouvelot had an interest as an amateur entomologist. In the U.S., silk-producing moths were being killed off by various diseases. Trouvelot was very interested in Lepidoptera larvae including native North American silk moths which he believed could potentially be used for silk production. For reasons that remain unknown, Trouvelot brought some spongy moth egg masses from Europe in the mid-1860s and was raising spongy moth larvae in the forest behind his house. Unfortunately, some of the larvae escaped into the nearby woods. Trouvelot likely mentioned the escape to local entomologists, and an entomology journal from 1870 claims the incident occurred the previous year. Some sources say Trouvelot issued warnings to government officials, but there is no record of these communications. If he did, no officials were willing to assist in searching out and destroying the moths.

Shortly following this incident, Trouvelot lost interest in entomology and turned again to astronomy. In this field he could put his skills as an artist to good use by illustrating his observations. His interest in astronomy was apparently aroused in 1870 when he witnessed several auroras.

When Joseph Winlock, the director of Harvard College Observatory, saw the quality of his illustrations, he invited Trouvelot to join the staff there in 1872. In 1875, he was invited to use the U. S. Naval Observatory to use the 26-inch refractor for a year. During the course of his life he produced about 7,000 quality astronomical illustrations. He first produced pastel illustrations and then fifteen of his most superb works were published as chromolithographs by Charles Scribner's Sons in 1881. He was particularly interested in the Sun, and discovered "veiled spots" in 1875. He was elected a fellow of the American Academy of Arts and Sciences in 1877.

Besides his illustrations, he published about 50 scientific papers.

By 1882, Trouvelot had returned to France and joined the Meudon Observatory where he worked with photography and became engaged in a bitter rivalry with his boss, the astronomer Jules Janssen. This was a few years before the magnitude of the problem caused by his spongy moth release became apparent to the local government of Massachusetts. He died in Meudon, France. The spongy moth was considered a serious pest and attempts were underway to eradicate it (ultimately these were unsuccessful). To this date, the spongy moth continues to expand its range in the United States, and together with other foliage-eating pests, cause an estimated $868 million in annual damages.

== Awards and honors ==
- Valz Prize by the French Academy of Sciences
- The crater Trouvelot on the Moon is named after him.
- The crater Trouvelot on Mars is named after him.

== See also ==
- Spongy moths in the United States
- Camille Flammarion

== Gallery ==
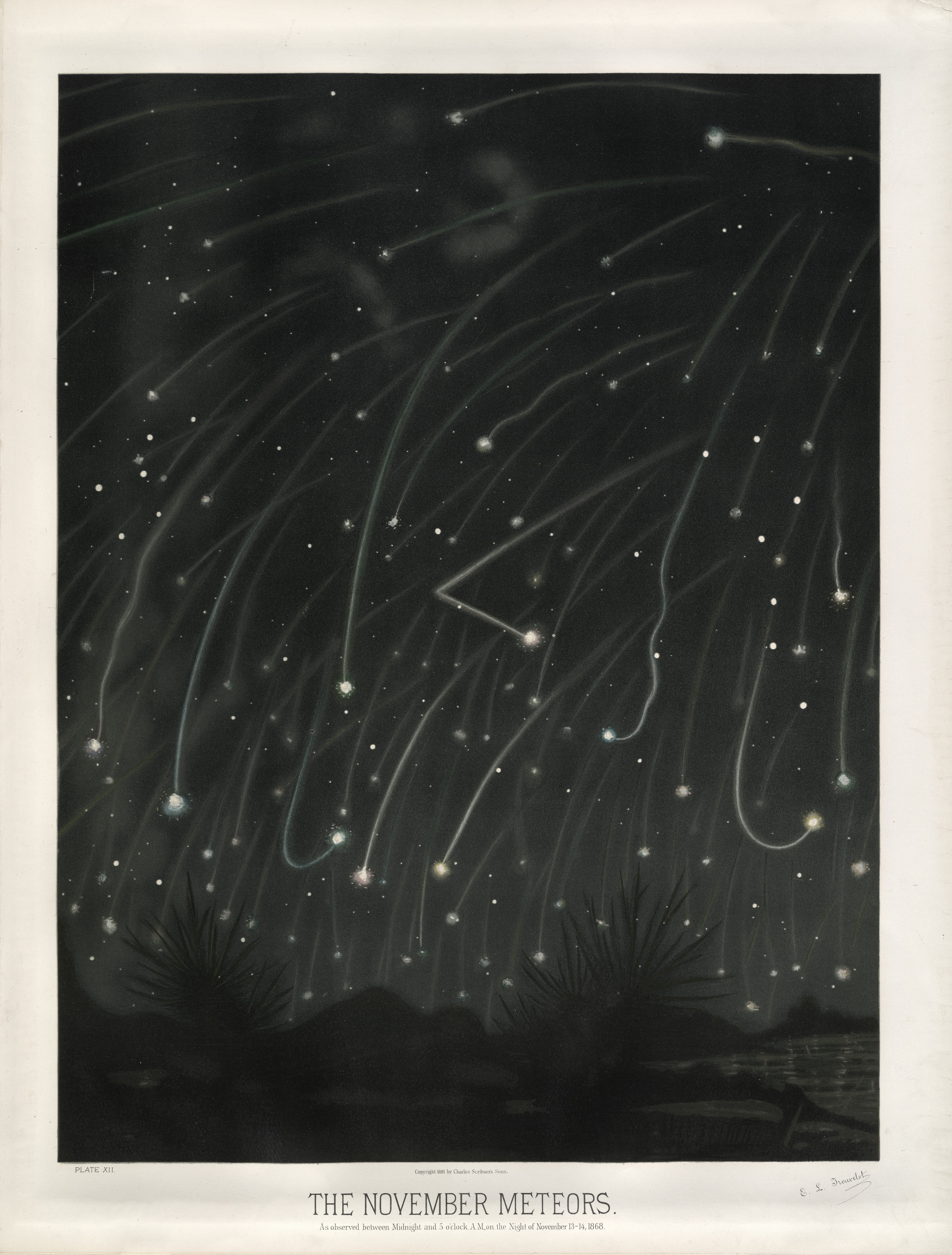
The November Meteors, observed Nov. 13-14, 1868

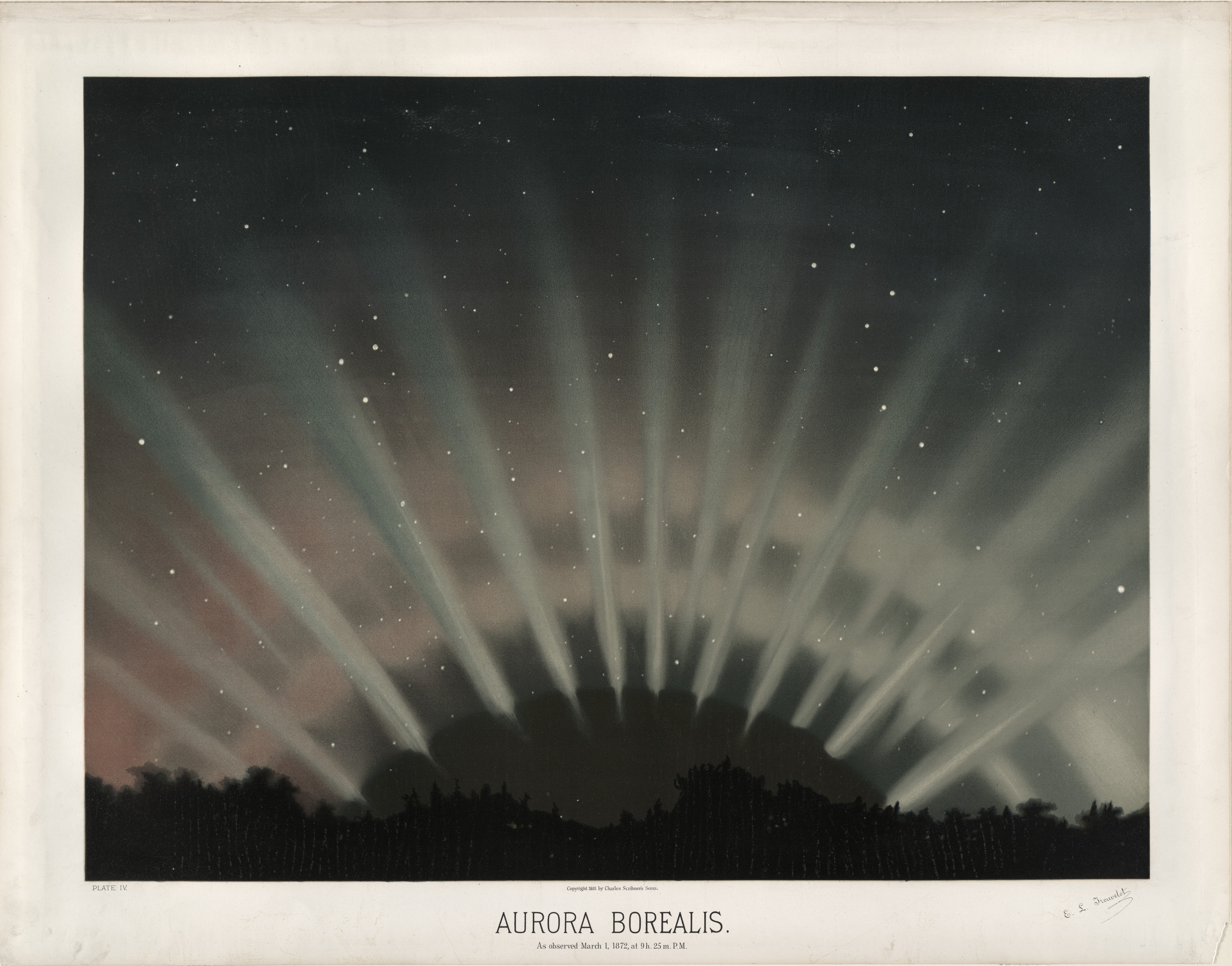
Aurora Borealis, observed Mar. 1, 1872

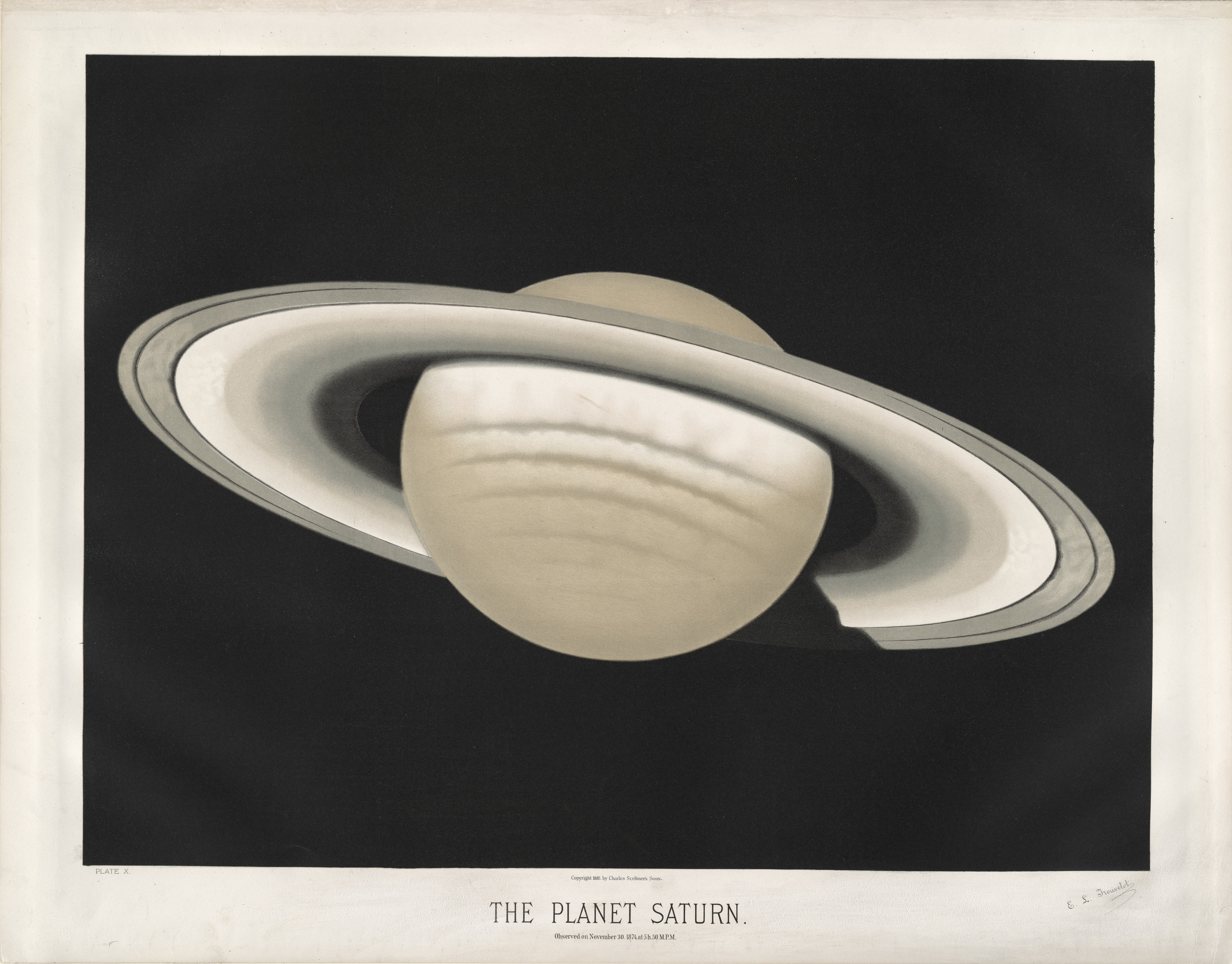
The Planet Saturn, observed Nov. 30, 1874

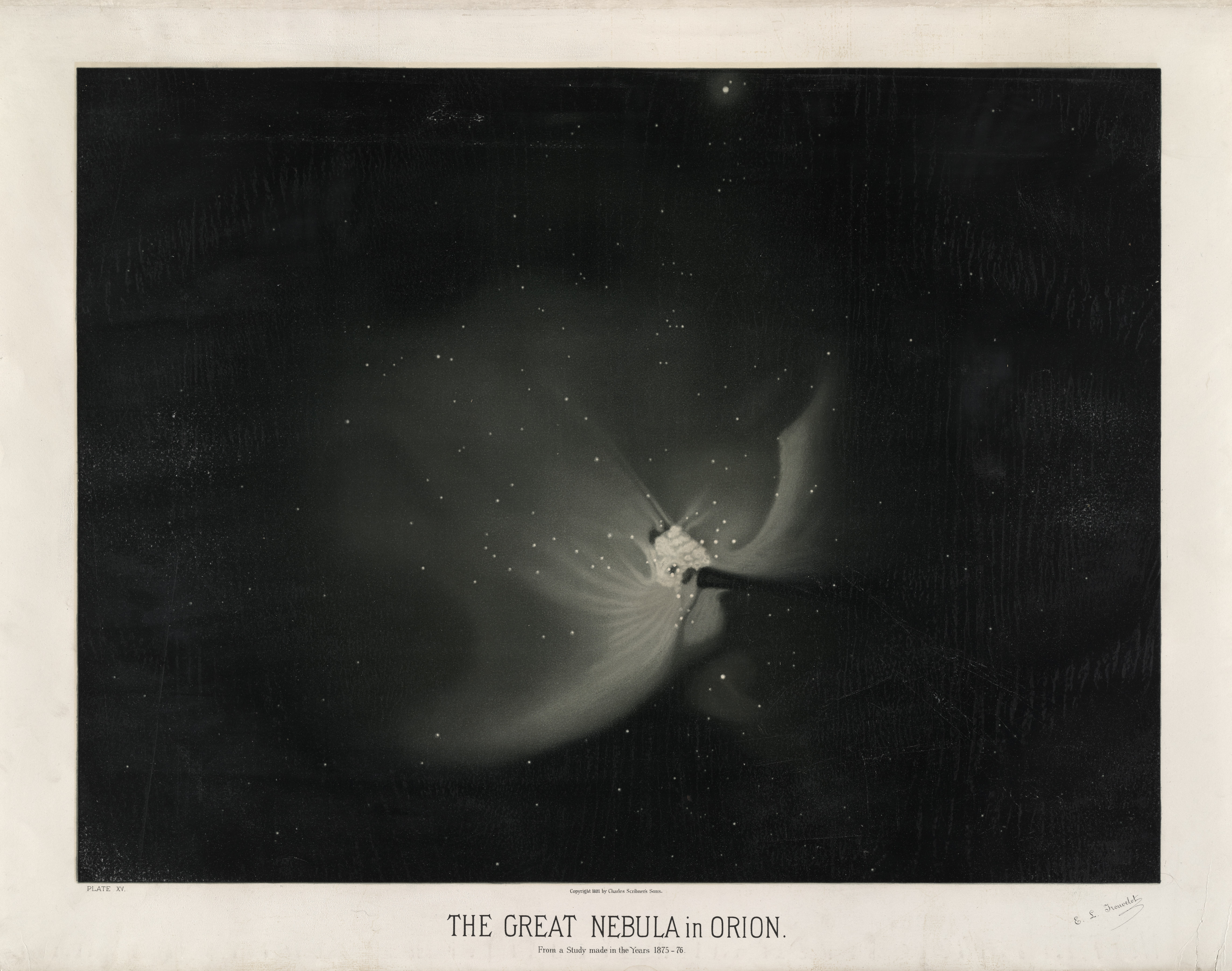
The Great Nebula in Orion, observed 1875-1876

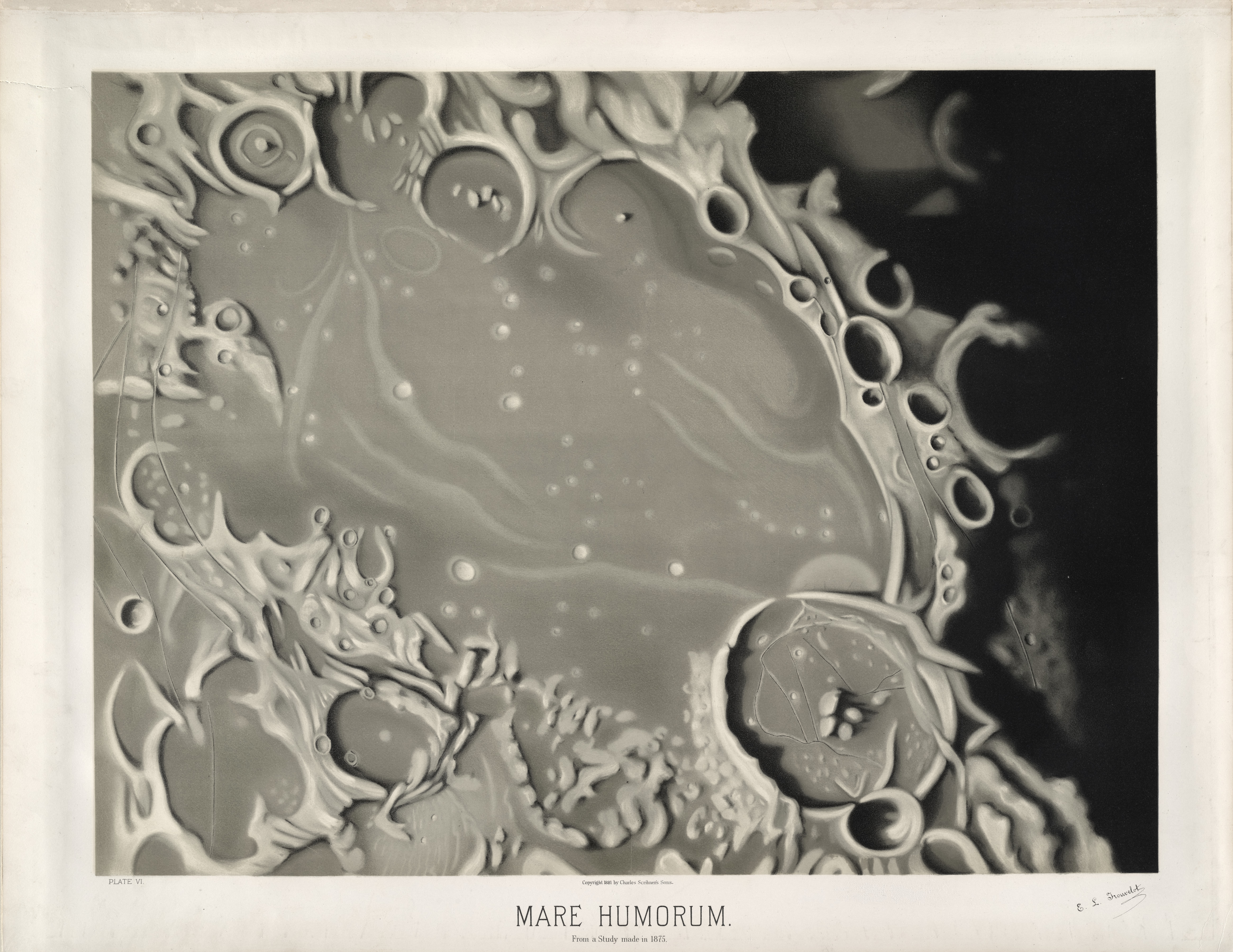
Mare Humorum, observed 1875

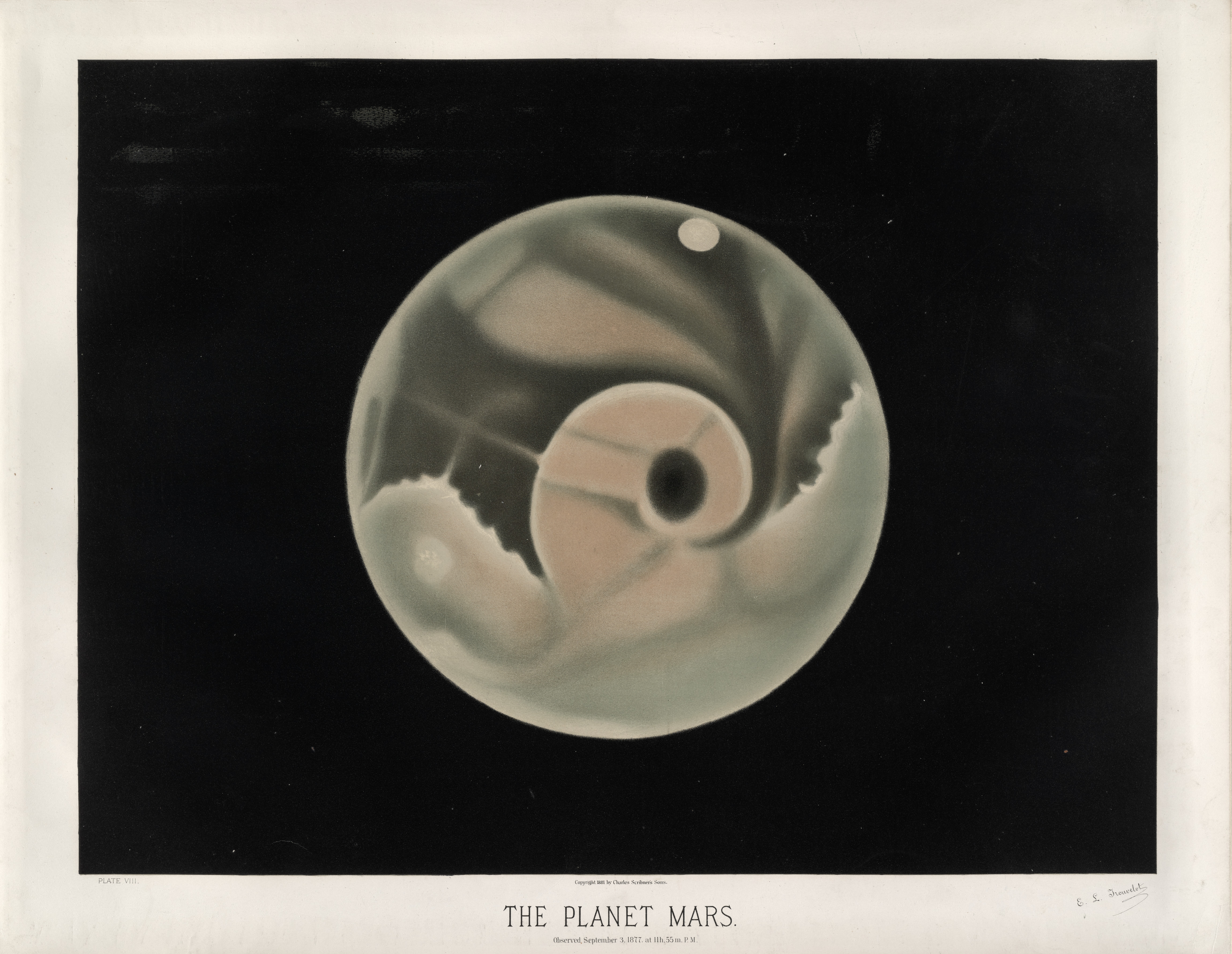
The Planet Mars, Sept. 3, 1877

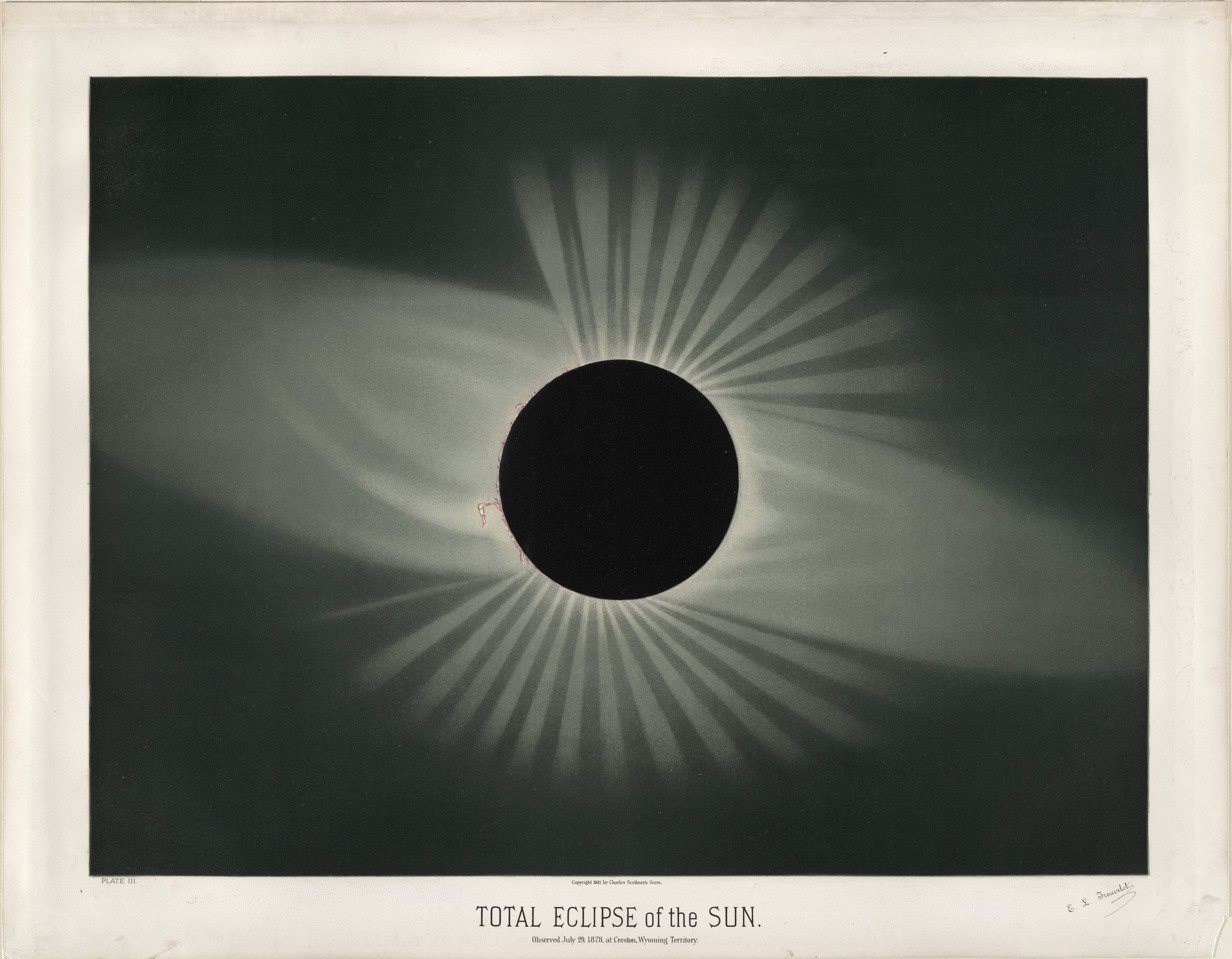
Total Eclipse of the Sun, observed July 29, 1878

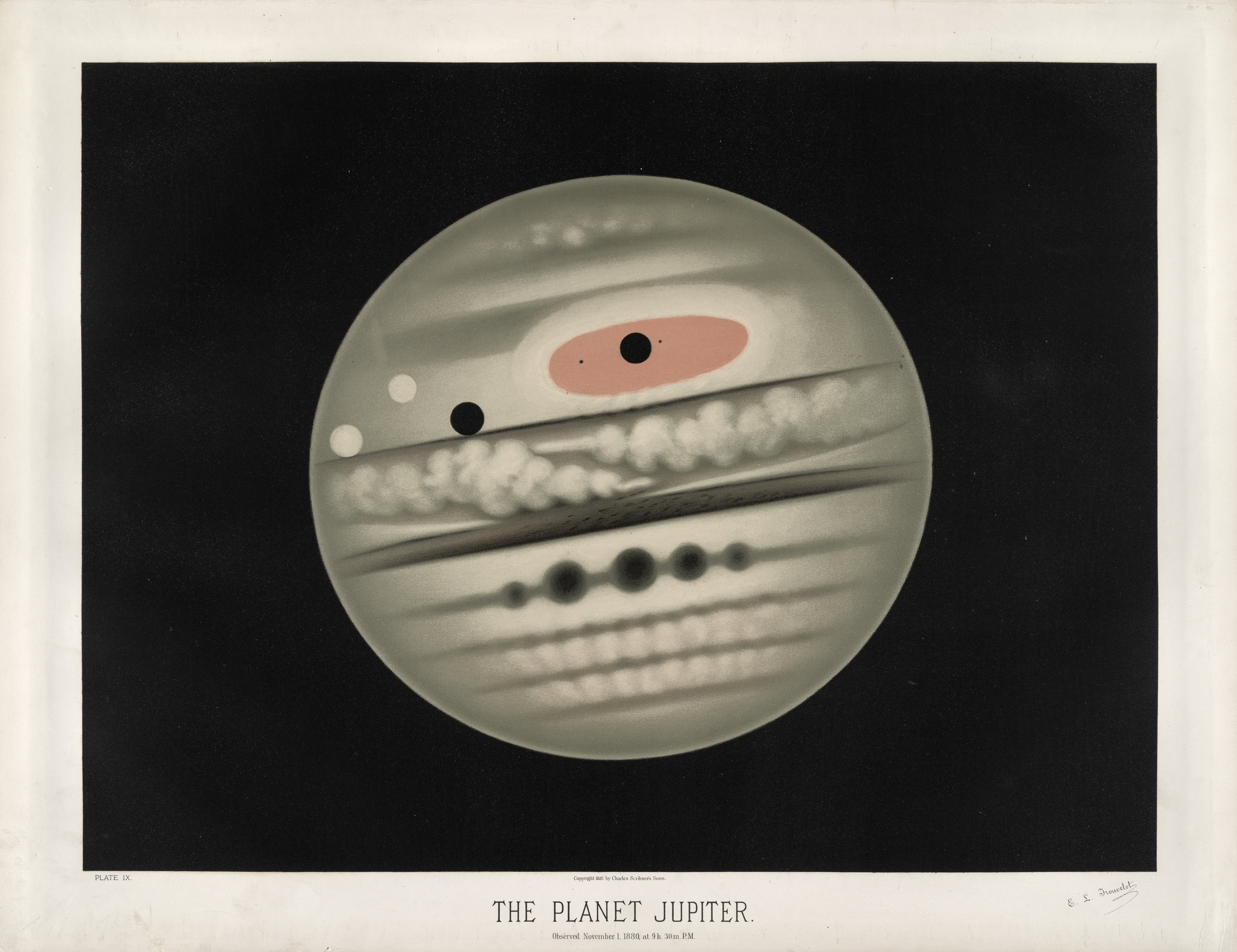
The Planet Jupiter, observed Nov. 1, 1880

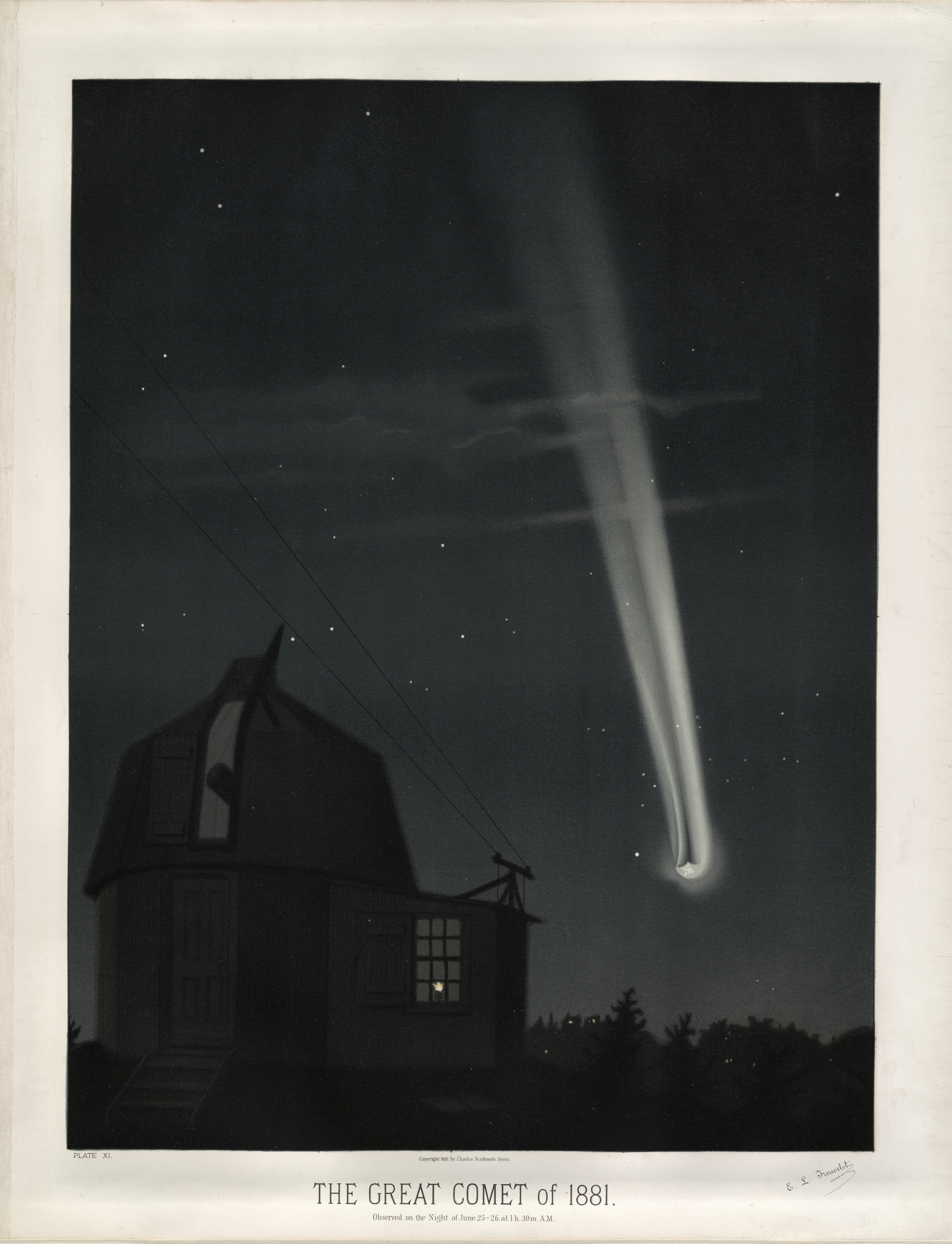
The Great Comet of 1881, observed June 25-26, 1881

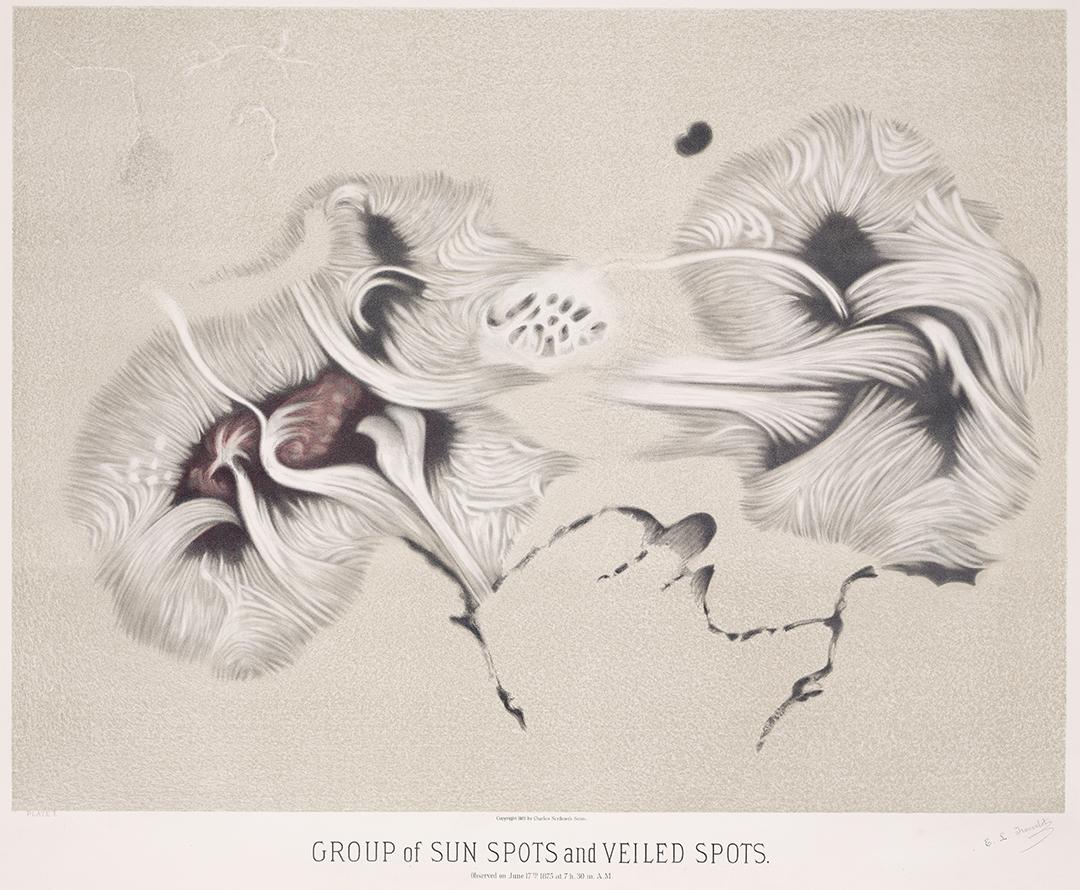
Group of Sun Spots and Veiled Spots, observed Jun. 17, 1875
