= Great comet =

Exceptionally bright comets

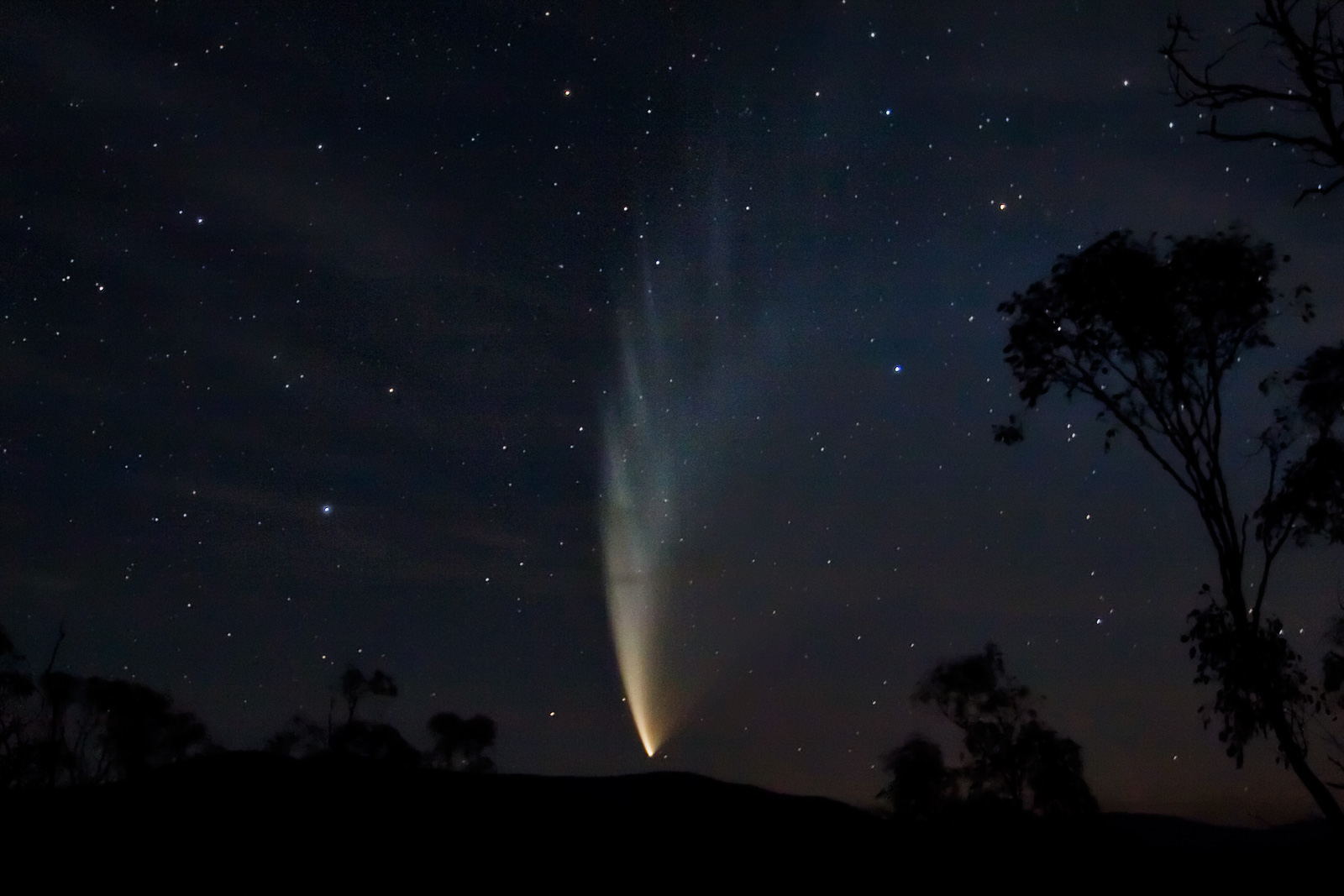
Comet McNaught as the Great Comet of 2007

A great comet is a comet that becomes exceptionally bright and easily observable to the naked eye. There is no official definition; the term is often attached to comets such as Halley's Comet, which, during certain appearances, are bright enough to be noticed by casual observers not looking for them and become well known outside the astronomical community. Typically, they are as bright or brighter than a second-magnitude star and have tails that are 10 degrees or longer under dark skies.

Great comets appear at irregular, unpredictable intervals, on average about once per decade. Although comets are officially named after their discoverers, great comets are sometimes also referred to by the year in which they appeared great, by using the formulation "The Great Comet of ...", followed by the year. The term can also be used as a generic name when a very bright comet is discovered by many observers simultaneously.

== Causes ==
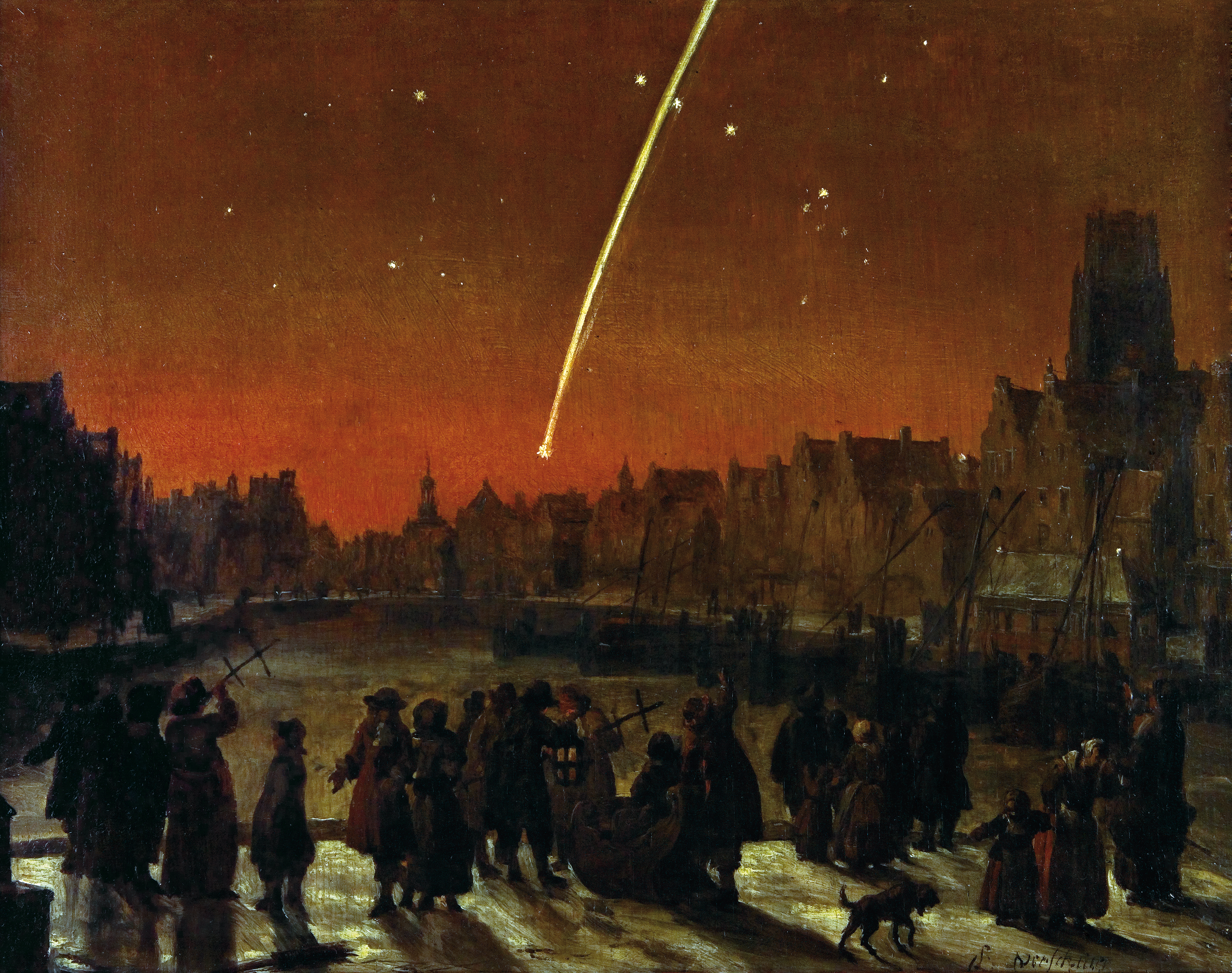
The Great Comet of 1680 over Rotterdam as painted by Lieve Verschuier

The vast majority of comets are never bright enough to be seen by the naked eye and generally pass through the inner Solar System unseen by anyone except astronomers. However, occasionally, a comet may brighten to naked eye visibility, and even more rarely, it may become as bright as or brighter than the brightest stars. The requirements for this to occur are: a large and active nucleus, a close approach to the Sun, and a close approach to the Earth. A comet fulfilling all three of those criteria will certainly be very bright.

Sometimes, a comet failing on one criterion will still be bright. For example, Comet Hale–Bopp did not approach the Sun very closely but had an exceptionally large and active nucleus. It was visible to the naked eye for several months and was very widely observed. Similarly, Comet Hyakutake was a relatively small comet but appeared bright because it passed very close to the Earth.

=== Size and activity of the nucleus ===
Cometary nuclei vary in size from a few hundreds of metres across or less to many kilometres across. When they approach the Sun, large amounts of gas and dust are ejected by cometary nuclei by solar heating. A crucial factor in how bright a comet becomes is how large and how active its nucleus is. After many returns to the inner Solar System, cometary nuclei become depleted in volatile materials and thus are much less bright than comets that are making their first passage through the Solar System.

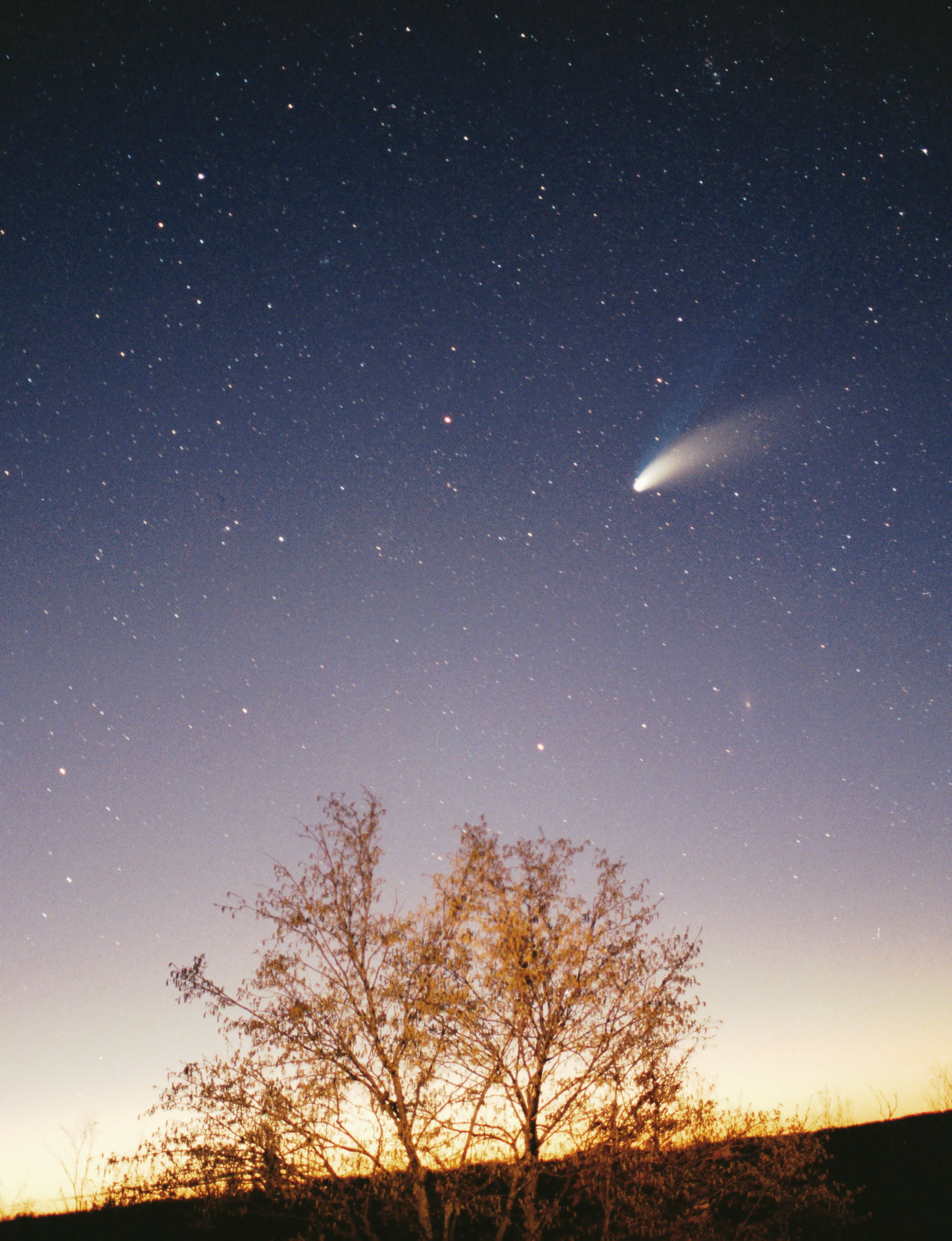
Comet Hale–Bopp

The sudden brightening of Comet Holmes in 2007 showed the importance of the activity of the nucleus in the comet's brightness. On October 23–24, 2007, the comet underwent a sudden outburst which caused it to brighten by factor of about 480,000 times. It unexpectedly brightened from an apparent magnitude of about 17 to about 2.8 in a period of only 42 hours, making it visible to the naked eye. All of those factors temporarily made comet 17P the largest (by radius) object in the Solar System although its nucleus is estimated to be only about 3.4 km in diameter.

=== Close perihelion approach ===
The brightness of a simple reflective body varies with the inverse square of its distance from the Sun. That is, if an object's distance from the Sun is halved, its brightness is quadrupled. However, comets behave differently because of their ejection of large amounts of volatile gas, which then also reflect sunlight and may also fluoresce. Their brightness varies roughly as the inverse cube of their distance from the Sun. That is, if a comet's distance from the Sun is halved, it will become eight times as bright.

This means that the peak brightness of a comet depends significantly on its distance from the Sun. For most comets, the perihelion of their orbit lies outside the Earth's orbit. Any comet approaching the Sun to within 0.5 AU (75 million km) or less may have a chance of becoming a great comet.

=== Close approach to the Earth ===
For a comet to become very bright, it also needs to pass close to the Earth. Halley's Comet, for example, is usually very bright when it passes through the inner Solar System every 76 years, but during its 1986 apparition, its closest approach to Earth was almost the most distant possible. The comet became visible to the naked eye but unspectacular. On the other hand, the intrinsically small and faint Comet Hyakutake (C/1996 B2) appeared very bright and spectacular due to its very close approach to Earth at its nearest during March 1996. Its passage near the Earth was one of the closest cometary approaches on record, with a distance of 0.1 AU (15 million km; 39 LD).

== List of great comets ==
Great comets of the past two millennia include the following below, in ascending order of chronological apparition. This list includes multiple bright apparitions of Halley's Comet since 86 BC.

Comet
Designation	Name	Image	Dimensions (km) (Note: Due to a non-spherical, irregular shape, a comet's x, y, and z axes instead of an (average) diameter are often used to describe its dimensions.)	Total magnitude (M1) (Note: Total magnitude (M1) as defined in Gary W. Kronk's Cometography: A Catalog of Comets book series)	Maximum brightness	Perihelion date	Remarks
X/−371	Great Comet of 371 BC		–	–	–	371 BC	A winter comet reported by Aristotle and Ephorus
P/−86 Q1	Halley		11 km	5.5	2.0	6 August 87 BC	Recorded by ancient Babylonians and Chinese
C/−43 K1	Caesar		–	−4.0	−9.0	25 May 44 BC	Named after Julius Caesar
P/−11 Q1	Halley		11 km	5.5	−5.0	10 October 12 BC	Visible to the naked eye for 5 months
X/−4 G1	Star of Bethlehem?		–	–	–	15 April 4 BC	
P/66 B1	Halley		11 km	5.5	−7.0	26 January 66	Possibly recorded on Josephus' book, The Jewish War
P/141 F1	Halley		11 km	5.5	−4.0	22 March 141	
X/178 R1	Great Comet of 178 AD		–	–	–	September 178	
X/191 T1	Great Comet of 191 AD		–	–	–	20 October 191	
P/218 H1	Halley		11 km	5.5	−4.0	17 May 218	
C/240 V1	Great Comet of 240 AD		–	4.5	–	30 November 240	
X/254	Great Comet of 254 AD		–	–	–	November–December 254	Reported tail length to be several tens of degrees. Possible progenitor/apparition of 322P/SOHO
P/295 J1	Halley		11 km	5.5	−3.0	20 April 295	
P/374 E1	Halley		11 km	5.5	−3.0	17 February 374	Passed within 13.5 million km from Earth
C/390 Q1	Great Comet of 390 AD		–	7.0	−1.0	5 September 390	
C/400 F1	Great Comet of 400 AD		–	6.0	0.0	25 February 400	
C/442 V1	Great Comet of 442 AD		–	1.5	1.0–2.0	15 December 442	
P/451 L1	Halley		11 km	5.5	−3.0	24 June 451	Appeared before the defeat of Attila the Hun at the Battle of Chalons
P/530 Q1	Halley		11 km	5.5	−3.0	26 September 530	
C/565 O1	Great Comet of 565 AD		–	1.5	0.0	15 July 565	
C/568 O1	Great Comet of 568 AD		–	5.0	0.0	25 September 568	
P/607 H1	Halley		11 km	5.5	−4.0	13 March 607	Passed within 13 million km from Earth
X/676 P1	Great Comet of 676 AD		–	–	–	August–September 676	Reported tail length about 7 to 8 degrees. Possibly an earlier apparition of C/1743 X1
P/684 R1	Halley		11 km	5.5	−2.0	28 October 684	
P/760 K1	Halley		11 km	5.5	−2.0	22 May 760	
C/770 K1	Great Comet of 770 AD		–	3.2	1.0–2.0	5 June 770	
P/837 F1	Halley		11 km	5.5	−3.0	28 February 837	Closest known approach to Earth by Halley at 5 million km
C/905 K1	Great Comet of 905 AD		–	4.5	0.0	26 April 905	
P/912 J1	Halley		11 km	5.5	−2.0	9 July 912	
P/989 N1	Halley		11 km	5.5	−1.0	9 September 989	
P/1066 G1	Halley		11 km	5.5	−4.0	23 March 1066	Recorded in the Bayeux Tapestry
X/1106 C1	Great Comet of 1106		–	–	–	1106	Parent body of the Kreutz sungrazers
C/1132 T1	Great Comet of 1132		–	4.5	−1.0	30 August 1132	
P/1145 G1	Halley		11 km	5.5	−2.0	21 April 1145	Depicted on the Eadwine Psalter
P/1222 R1	Halley		11 km	5.5	−1.0	30 September 1222	
C/1240 B1	Great Comet of 1240		–	2.5	0.0	21 January 1240	
C/1264 N1	Great Comet of 1264		–	3.0–4.0	0.0	20 July 1264	
P/1301 R1	Halley		11 km	5.5	−1.0	24 October 1301	Depicted on the Adoration of the Magi by Giotto di Bondone
P/1378 S1	Halley		11 km	5.5	−1.0	9 November 1378	
C/1402 D1	Great Comet of 1402		–	0.0–1.0	−3.0	21 March 1402	Possibly an earlier apparition of C/1743 X1
P/1456 K1	Halley		11 km	5.5	0.0	9 June 1456	
C/1468 S1	Great Comet of 1468		–	3.2	1.0–2.0	7 October 1468	
C/1471 Y1	Great Comet of 1471		–	2.0	−3.0	1 March 1472	Passed within 10 million km from Earth on January 1472
P/1531 P1	Halley		11 km	5.5	−1.0	25 August 1531	
C/1532 R1	Great Comet of 1532		–	1.8	−1.0	18 October 1532	
C/1533 M1	Great Comet of 1533		–	3.0	0.0	15 June 1533	
C/1556 D1	Great Comet of 1556		–	3.0	−2.0	22 April 1556	
C/1577 V1	Tycho		–	−1.8	−3.0	27 October 1577	
P/1607 S1	Halley		11 km	5.5	0.0	27 October 1607	Apparition seen by Johannes Kepler
C/1618 W1	Great Comet of 1618		–	4.6	0.0–1.0	6 December 1618	
C/1664 W1	Great Comet of 1664		–	2.4	−1.0	4 December 1664	
C/1665 F1	Great Comet of 1665		–	4.9	−1.0	24 April 1665	
C/1668 E1	Great Comet of 1668		–	6.0	1.0–2.0	28 February 1668	
C/1680 V1	Kirch		–	4.0	1.0–2.0	18 December 1680	Also known as Newton's Comet
P/1682 Q1	Halley		11 km	5.5	−1.0	15 September 1682	Apparition seen by its namesake, Sir Edmond Halley
C/1686 R1	Great Comet of 1686		–	5.0	1.0–2.0	16 September 1686	
C/1743 X1	Klinkenberg–Chéseaux		–	0.5	−7.0	1 March 1744	
P/1758 Y1	Halley		11 km	5.5	−1.0	13 March 1759	First successfully predicted return of Halley
C/1760 A1	Great Comet of 1760		–	7.6	2.0	17 December 1759	Passed within 10.2 million km from Earth
C/1769 P1	Messier		–	3.2	0.0	8 October 1769	
C/1771 A1	Great Comet of 1771		–	7.5	–	22 November 1770	
C/1783 X1	Great Comet of 1783		–	3.6	–	21 January 1784	
C/1807 R1	Great Comet of 1807		–	1.6	1.0	19 September 1807	
C/1811 F1	Flaguergues		30–40 km	–	0.0	12 September 1811	Visible to the naked eye for 8.55 months
C/1819 N1	Tralles		–	4.0	1.0–2.0	28 June 1819	
C/1823 Y1	de Bréauté–Pons		–	6.5	0.0	9 December 1823	
C/1830 F1	Great Comet of 1830		–	5.2	–	9 April 1830	
C/1831 A1	Herapath		–	6.2	2.0	28 December 1830	
P/1835 P1	Halley		11 km	5.5	0.0	16 November 1835	
C/1843 D1	Great Comet of 1843		15.8 km	4.9	−3.0	27 February 1843	Kreutz sungrazer
C/1844 Y1	Great Comet of 1844		–	4.9	2.5	14 December 1844	
C/1845 L1	Great Comet of 1845		–	4.0	−2.0	6 June 1845	
C/1854 F1	Great Comet of 1854		–	7.0	2.0	24 March 1854	
C/1858 L1	Donati		–	3.3	0.0–1.0	30 September 1858	First comet to be photographed
C/1861 J1	Great Comet of 1861		–	3.9	0.0	12 June 1861	
C/1865 B1	Great Southern Comet of 1865		–	3.8	1.0	14 January 1865	
C/1874 H1	Coggia		–	5.7	0.0–1.0	9 July 1874	
C/1880 C1	Great Southern Comet of 1880		2.2 km	7.1–8.9	3.0	28 January 1880	Kreutz sungrazer
C/1881 K1	Tebbutt		–	4.1	1.0	16 June 1881	
C/1882 R1	Great Comet of 1882		61.4 km	0.7	−17.0	17 September 1882	Kreutz sungrazer, brightest comet ever recorded in history
C/1887 B1	Thome		–	6.3	–	11 January 1887	Kreutz sungrazer
C/1901 G1	Viscara		–	9.0	−1.5	24 April 1901	
C/1910 A1	Great January Comet of 1910		–	5.0	−5.0	17 January 1910	Appeared about four months before the 1910 apparition of Halley
P/1909 R1	Halley		11 km	5.5	0.0	20 April 1910	
C/1927 X1	Skjellerup–Maristany		–	5.2	−4.0	18 December 1927	
C/1947 X1	Southern Comet of 1947		–	6.0	−5.0	2 December 1947	
C/1948 V1	Eclipse Comet of 1948		–	9.0	−1.0	27 October 1948	
C/1956 R1	Arend–Roland		–	5.9	−0.5	8 April 1957	
C/1957 P1	Mrkos		–	4.17	1.0	1 August 1957	
C/1962 C1	Seki–Lines		–	–	−1.5	1 April 1962	
C/1965 S1	Ikeya–Seki		8.6 km	–	−10.0	21 October 1965	Kreutz sungrazer. Brightest comet of the 20th century
C/1969 Y1	Bennett		7.52 km	4.6	0.0	20 March 1970	
C/1975 V1	West		–	4.4	−3.0	26 February 1976	
C/1996 B1	Hyakutake		4.2 km	7.4	0.0	1 May 1996	Passed within 0.1 AU from Earth
C/1995 O1	Hale–Bopp		60 km	−1.3	−1.8	1 April 1997	Visible to the naked eye for 18 months
C/2006 P1	McNaught		25 km?	5.4	−5.5	12 January 2007	Brightest comet of the 21st century so far
C/2011 W3	Lovejoy		0.2–0.5 km	15.3	−4.0	16 December 2011	Kreutz sungrazer
C/2020 F3	NEOWISE		5 km	7.5	0.5–1.0	3 July 2020	
C/2023 A3	Tsuchinshan–ATLAS		11.8 km	6.5	−4.9	27 September 2024	
C/2024 G3	ATLAS		–	7.6	−3.8	13 January 2025	
