= C/1845 L1 (Colla) =

Parabolic comet

C/1845 L1 (Colla) (Great Comet of 1845)
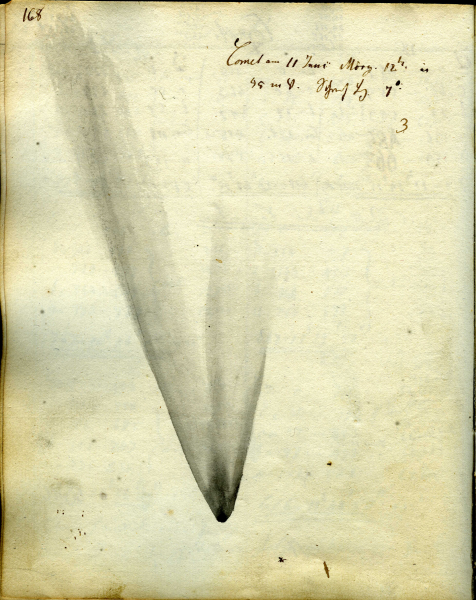
- The Great Comet of 1845 sketched by Julius Schmidt in 11 June 1845.

Discovery
- Discovered by: Antonio Colla
- Discovery site: Paris, France
- Discovery date: 2 June 1845

Designations
- Alternative designations: 1845 III

Orbital characteristics
- Epoch: 18 June 1845 (JD 2395100.5)
- Observation arc: 29 days
- Earliest precovery date: 31 May 1845
- Number of observations: 100
- Perihelion: 0.401 AU
- Eccentricity: 1.00366
- Inclination: 152.15°
- Longitude of ascending node: 326.35°
- Argument of periapsis: 58.786°
- Mean anomaly: 11.813°
- Last perihelion: 6 June 1845

Physical characteristics
- Comet total magnitude (M1): 4.0
- Apparent magnitude: 0.08 or –2.0 (Note: As bright as Capella or Jupiter.) (1845 apparition)

The Great June Comet of 1845, formally designated as C/1845 L1, is a bright non-periodic comet that became visible to the naked eye between June and July 1845. It is one of the few great comets in history. It is sometimes known as Colla's Comet, after the first astronomer to report its discovery, Antonio Colla.

== Observational history ==
=== Discovery ===
Antonio Colla was the first to report the comet's discovery from Paris, France on 2 June 1845, situated "near the head of Medusa" in the constellation Perseus, however no position was recorded until George Phillips Bond noted it a day later. (Note: Reported position a day after discovery was: α = 3^{h} 27.6^{m} , δ = 38° 15′) The comet was already almost visible to the naked eye, with a tail extending 1 degree to the north-northeast. The comet was subsequently seen by many observers an hour after Colla first spotted it, reporting the brightness comparable to the star Capella.

In October 1845, long after the comet faded from view, an issue of the American Journal of Science reported a prediscovery observation of C/1845 L1 conducted from Norfolk, Virginia on 31 May 1845.

=== Follow-up observations ===
The comet continued to be observed across the globe for the entire month of June 1845. It was last observed by Joseph S. Hubbard and John H. C. Coffin on 2 July 1845, while it was in the constellation Cancer. (Note: Final reported position were the following: α = 8^{h} 51.4^{m} , δ = 24° 29′) Around the same time, Augustin Reslhuber attempted to spot the comet but was unable to find it.

== Orbit ==
Heinrich d'Arrest computed an elliptical orbit suggesting that C/1845 L1 is a long-period comet has an orbital period of 250 years, and he noted the apparent similarity between it and C/1596 N1 (Brahe). However this was disproven in 1904, when Henry Allen Peck revised the orbital period to approximately 313000 years, making the link to the 1596 comet invalid. Further calculations by Richard L. Branham, Jr. in 2009, showed that the comet was about 260 AU (39 billion km) from Earth in 1596. Branham also revised Peck's orbit into a hyperbolic trajectory, eliminating the possibility of C/1845 L1 becoming a near-Earth object.

== See also ==
- Great Comet of 1843
