= Great Comet of 1760 =

Comet spotted in Lisbon

C/1760 A1 (Great Comet of 1760)
Discovery
- Discovered by: Abbe Chevalier; Charles Messier
- Discovery date: 7 January 1760

Designations
- Alternative designations: 1759 III

Orbital characteristics
- Epoch: 17 December 1759 (JD 2363871.841)
- Observation arc: 31 days
- Perihelion: 0.96576 AU
- Eccentricity: ~1.000
- Inclination: 175.126°
- Longitude of ascending node: 83.553°
- Argument of periapsis: 301.727°
- Last perihelion: 17 December 1759

Physical characteristics
- Apparent magnitude: 2.0 (1760 apparition)

The Great Comet of 1760, also known as C/1760 A1 by its modern nomenclature, was first seen on 7 January 1760 by Abbe Chevalier at Lisbon. Charles Messier also spotted the comet on 8 January 1760 in Paris, by the sword of Orion. The comet was his third discovery and the comet was the 51st to have a calculated orbit. Messier observed the comet for a total of 6 days.

== Observational history ==
It approached the Earth to within approximately 0.0682 AU (10.20 million km; 6.34 million mi) on January 8, 1760. This was the 17th closest known approach by a comet up to 2006. Messier gave the comet a magnitude rating of 2.0, making it easily visible to the unaided eye. Messier also gave the comet an elongation angle of 140 degrees. Two days later, James Short also recorded his sighting of the comet while it was in the constellation Eridanus, noting that it moves about 2 degrees per day towards the west.

Messier came up against opposition from Navy astronomer Joseph Nicholas Delisle, who had employed Messier from October 1751, because Delisle would not publish the discovery Messier had made. This was a continuation of the mistrust that had developed between Messier and Delisle because Delisle had been slow to publish work done by Messier in 1759; Messier had independently rediscovered Halley's Comet on 21 January 1759 but because Messier had doubted the correctness of Delisle's path, Delisle instructed Messier to continue observing the comet and refused to announce his discovery. Delisle apparently later changed his mind and announced the discovery on 1 April 1759, but other French astronomers discredited Delisle's claim, labelling the discovery an April Fools' joke. Delisle retired in 1765.

As of June 2008, the comet was about 216 AU from the Sun.
