= C/1769 P1 (Messier) =

Great Comet of 1769

C/1769 P1 (Messier) (Great Comet of 1769)
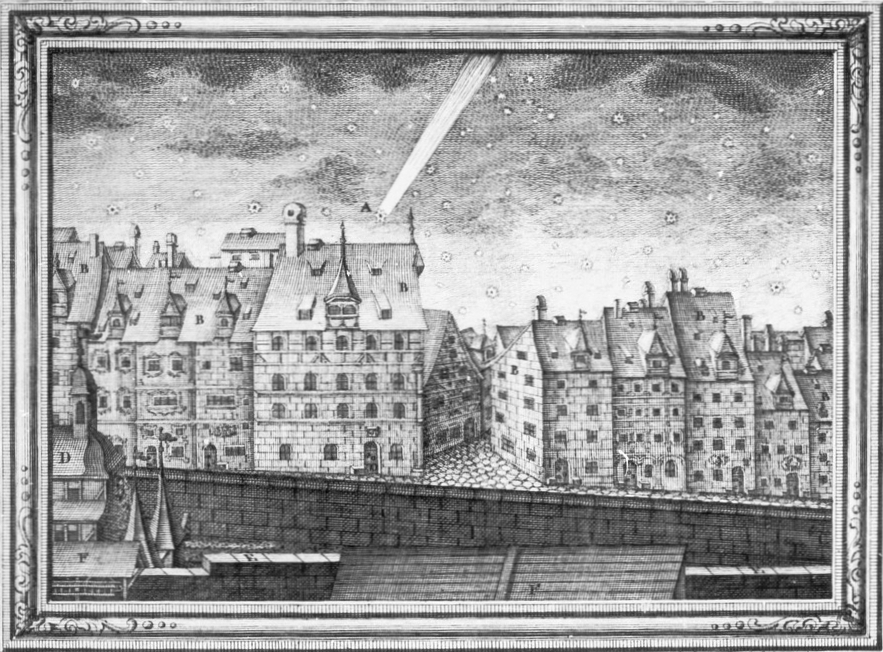
- The Great Comet over Nuremberg, Germany on the morning of 9 September 1769

Discovery
- Discovered by: Charles Messier
- Discovery date: 8 August 1769

Orbital characteristics
- Epoch: 8 October 1769 (JD 2367454.6204)
- Observation arc: 101 days
- Number of observations: 37
- Aphelion: 326.788 AU
- Perihelion: 0.1228 AU
- Semi-major axis: 163.455 AU
- Eccentricity: 0.99925
- Orbital period: ~2,090 years
- Inclination: 40.734°
- Longitude of ascending node: 178.293°
- Argument of periapsis: 329.123°
- Last perihelion: 8 October 1769

Physical characteristics
- Mean radius: 3.05 km (1.90 mi) (Note: Calculated mean radius using the formula: $\log_{10}\,(\,R\,)\ =\;0.9 +\;0.13 (\,H\,)$ Where $\,H\,$ is the comet's absolute total magnitude (M1))
- Comet total magnitude (M1): 3.2
- Apparent magnitude: 0.0 (1769 apparition)

C/1769 P1 (Messier) is a long-period comet that was visible to the naked eye at its last apparition in 1769. The comet is classified as a great comet due to its superlative brightness.

== Discovery and observations ==
At the Naval Observatory in Paris, late in the evening of 8 August 1769 Charles Messier in his routine telescope search for comets saw a small nebulosity just above the horizon in the constellation Aries. On the next evening he saw the nebulosity by unassisted eye and confirmed it to be a comet due to its motion in the sky. On 15 August Messier estimated the length of the comet's tail to be 6°. Giovanni Domenico Maraldi and César François Cassini de Thury saw the comet for the first time on 22 August by telescope and later by unassisted eye. Chinese observers reported a "broom star" appearing on 24 August in the southeastern sky. Jean-François-Marie de Surville observed the comet in the pre-dawn of 26 August from a ship off the Philippines and reported the comet as having a tail but not bright.

According to observers, throughout the month of August the comet became brighter with a lengthening tail. On 28 August Eustachio Zanotti in Bologna and Messier observed a tail length of about 15°. Captain James Cook aboard HMS Endeavour in the South Pacific saw the comet for the first time on the pre-dawn of 30 August and measured the tail at 42°. On 31 August, Maraldi and Cassini measured the tail at 18°, perhaps because their local atmospheric conditions were less favorable than Captain Cook's.

Toward the end of August the comet was observed from many ships, but the reports added little of value to the land-based observations. On 3 September Messier observed a tail length of 36° and on 5 September a tail length of 43°; he reported that the tail was slightly curved and the head appeared reddish. On the following nights, the tail displayed bright parallel rays. The tail became even longer and on 9 September Messier measured a tail length of 55°.

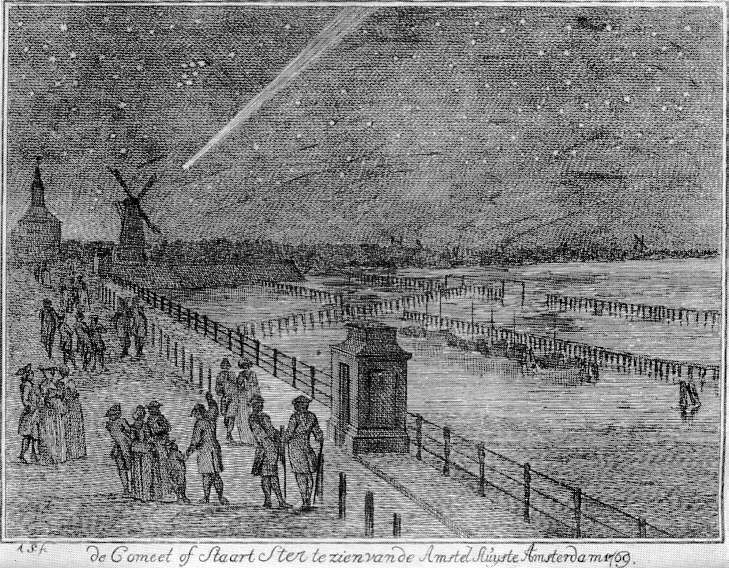
The Great Comet of 1769 over Amsterdam

By 10 September when the comet made its closest approach to Earth, Messier observed a tail length of up to 60°. On 11 September Alexandre Guy Pingré on a ship between Teneriffa and Cádiz estimated a tail length over 90°; however, only the tail's first 40° nearest the head were very bright, while the end of the tail was very dim. According to Messier, the maximum tail length measured for the comet was 97° at Île Bourbon by de la Nux.

In September the comet became more difficult to see and the visibility of the tail dwindled. On 16 September Messier saw the comet for the last time before its return after perihelion. Maraldi was able to see the comet in the evening twilight up to 18 September.

In September Jérôme Lalande had calculated predictive orbital elements, which indicated that the perihelion would occur on 7 October. Because of Lallende's predictions, astronomers began to search for the comet again around the middle of October. At Royal Greenwich Observatory Maskelyne's observations on 23 October revealed a short, broad and weakly visible tail. On 24 October Messier saw the comet in the evening sky with the unassisted eye but difficult to discern; by telescope he saw a bright nucleus with a tail about 2° degree. On 25 October Joseph-Louis Lagrange in Milan saw the comet with a dim tail, but a brighter nucleus than in September.

On 5th day of Ashwin 1691 (Gregorian equivalent of 5 October 1769), The comet was observed by Ahom astrologers in Rangpur (present day Sivasagar), and this observation was written down in the Ahom text, Tungkhungia Buranji.

In November the comet became much dimmer although still followed by many observers, but only Messier made precise measurements. On 17 November the comet was very dim but the tail was still 1.5° long. After 18 November Messier could only see the comet by telescope. Chinese observers reported that by 25 November the “broom star” had completely disappeared. Messier and Maraldi saw the comet for the last time on 1 December. On 3 December Pehr Wilhelm Wargentin became the last observer to report a sighting of the comet.

On 22 September the comet's brightness reached magnitude 0.

== Possible cometary phase ==
According to J. Russell Hind there is some evidence that the comet C/1769 P1 exhibited a cometary phase similar to a lunar phase or planetary phase. Hind wrote concerning the 1769 comet:

... an observer expressly states that he had seen the nucleus as a thin crescent, and subsequently as a half-moon, in the course of the comet's descent toward the sun.

== Orbit ==
Orbital elements for the comet were calculated by many astronomers, including Lalande, Giuseppe Asclepi, Cassini, Anders Johan Lexell, Leonhard Euler, Pingré, Adrien-Marie Legendre and Friedrich Wilhelm Bessel. Lexell, Asclepi, Pingré and Bessel were especially successful in calculating the comet's elliptic orbit.

Using observations over 101 days in 1769, four decades later Bessel in 1810 calculated an orbit for the comet inclined about 41° to the ecliptic. At perihelion on 8 October 1769 the comet was about 0.123 AU (18.4 million km) from the Sun. On 5 September the comet was about 0.648 AU (96.9 million km) from Venus and on 10 September about 0.323 AU (48.3 million km) from Earth. On 3 October on its path away from the Sun, the comet came to within about 0.595 AU (89.0 million km) from Venus.

== Napoleon's Comet ==
Napoleon Bonaparte was born on 15 August 1769, one week after Messier's first sighting of the Great Comet of 1769. According to Käufl and Sterken:

… Napoleon Bonaparte ... was aware of the legendary tradition wherein comets were associated with great rulers and by adopting comet symbolism, like that of imperial Rome, he lent legitimacy and resonance to his reign. The first historical comet linked with Napoleon was the Great Comet of 1769 (frequently termed "Napoleon's Comet"), which had an unusual red luster. Since portents are multivalent, his enemies later interpreted it as foreshadowing the bloodshed and war he brought.

Messier self-published a booklet (memoir) near the end of his life, connecting the comet's discovery to the birth of Napoleon. According to Meyer:

As hard as it may seem to accept, the memoir is an ingratiation to Napoleon in order to receive attention and monetary support. It is full of servility and opportunism. Messier did not even refrain from utilizing astrology to reach his goal. Messier comes quickly to the point on the first page of the memoir, by stating that the beginning of the epoch of Napoleon the Great ... coincides with the discovery of one of the greatest comets ever observed.

The Great Comet of 1811 was interpreted by many in 1812 and later as a portent of Napoleon's invasion of Russia and is also often called Napoleon's Comet. The great comets that occurred during Napoleon's lifetime were those of 1769, 1771, 1783, 1807, 1811, and 1819 (and possibly other years depending upon the definition of “great comet”).
