= Great Comet of 390 =

Parabolic comet

C/390 Q1 (Great Comet of 390 AD)
Discovery
- Discovery date: 7–22 August 390

Orbital characteristics
- Epoch: 5 September 390 (JD 1863752.5)
- Observation arc: 26 days
- Number of observations: 3
- Perihelion: 0.920 AU
- Eccentricity: ~1.000
- Max. orbital speed: 44 km/s
- Inclination: ~36.00°
- Longitude of ascending node: ~356.0°
- Argument of periapsis: ~23.00°
- Last perihelion: 5 September 390

Physical characteristics
- Apparent magnitude: –1.0 (390 AD apparition)

The Great Comet of 390 AD, also known as C/390 Q1 by its modern designation, was a comet that appeared very bright in the night sky—a great comet. It was recorded prominently in ancient Chinese and Korean texts, particularly the Chén Shū.

== Discovery and observations ==
No surviving contemporary records of the comet are known. The earliest mention of the comet is found in the Chén Shū text, which was compiled by Chinese astronomer, Li Chunfeng, in 635 AD. The exact date of discovery isn't known, but according to the Chén Shū, the comet was probably discovered as a "sparkling star" that appeared between the stars Castor and Pollux, which based on Ichiro Hasegawa's orbital reconstructions in 1979, is most likely the early morning of 22 August 390. The Koreans might have also seen the comet at the same time as the Chinese, but they weren't specific on the date of observations.

According to Chinese sources, the comet then moved towards the constellations Lynx and Ursa Major on 28 August. It reached its peak magnitude of –1.0 on 8 September 390, now sporting a tail about 70–100 degrees in length. It was last seen by Chinese astronomers on 17 September 390.
