= C/1831 A1 (Herapath) =

Great Comet of 1831

C/1831 A1 (Herapath) (Great Comet of 1831)
Discovery
- Discovered by: John Herapath; Thomas G. Taylor
- Discovery date: 7 January 1831

Designations
- Alternative designations: 1830 II

Orbital characteristics
- Epoch: 28 December 1830 (JD 2389814.6604)
- Observation arc: 46 days
- Number of observations: 61
- Perihelion: 0.1259 AU
- Eccentricity: ~1.000
- Inclination: 135.263°
- Longitude of ascending node: 340.239°
- Argument of periapsis: 26.888°
- Last perihelion: 28 December 1830

Physical characteristics
- Comet total magnitude (M1): 6.2
- Apparent magnitude: 2.0 (1831 apparition, possibly brighter in late 1830)

Herapath's Comet, also known as C/1831 A1 by its modern designation, is a bright comet that was visible in the naked eye in 1831. Due to its brightness, it is considered to be the Great Comet of 1831.

== Discovery and observation ==
Reconstruction of the comet's trajectory indicates that C/1831 A1 must have been bright enough to be seen with the naked eye throughout the southern hemisphere (possibly even brighter than Venus) prior to its perihelion on 28 December 1830. However, no written records of its appearance prior to its discovery have yet been found.

The comet was already on its outbound trajectory when it was first discovered by an English astronomer named John Herapath, from Hounslow Heath around 6:00 AM on 7 January 1831 as a magnitude +2.0 object in the constellation Serpens. He reported that "the tail was then nearly perpendicular to the horizon, inclined towards the south, and of a white colour, apparently between 1–2° long". Later studies in 2011 revealed that it was independently discovered by Thomas Glanville Taylor from the Madras Observatory in India around six hours earlier, but he had not reported his sighting.

Further naked eye observations between 8 and 23 January 1831 were made by other astronomers like Wilhelm von Biela, Robert T. Paine, Giovanni Santini, and Niccolò Cacciatore.

The comet's brightness rapidly declined to magnitude +4.0 by late January, but the tail's length across the sky remained about 3°. By February 1831, the comet was further observed using telescopes by astronomers Friedrich B. Nicolai and Heinrich Olbers, while Taylor continued his observations until 20 February It was last seen by Karl Friedrich Knorre on 19 March 1831.

== Orbit ==
Calculations by Jakob P. Wolfers, Christian F. Peters, Knorre and Santini determined the comet's path in a retrograde parabolic trajectory inclined around 135° to the ecliptic. On 28 December 1830 it made its closest approach to the Sun at a distance of 0.13 AU (19 million km), making it a sungrazing comet. It made its closest approach to Earth on 16 February 1831 at a distance of 0.53 AU (79 million km). Due to the limited initial data, it is unknown if the comet will return to the inner Solar System or it is ejected into interstellar space.
