= Joseph Stillman Hubbard =

American astronomer (1823–1863)

- Born: September 7, 1823; New Haven, Connecticut, U.S.
- Died: August 16, 1863 (aged 39); New Haven, Connecticut, U.S.
- Education: Yale College (AB)
- Occupations: Astronomer; educator
- Years active: 1844–1863
- Spouse: Sarah E. L. Handy (m. 1848; died 1861)
- Children: 1
- Relatives: William Hubbard

Joseph Stillman Hubbard (September 7, 1823 – August 16, 1863) was an American astronomer and educator. He was professor of mathematics at the United States Naval Observatory from 1845 to his death. He was an original member of the National Academy of Sciences and a fellow of the American Philosophical Society.

== Early life ==
Joseph Stillman Hubbard was born on September 7, 1823, in New Haven, Connecticut, to Eliza (née Church) and Ezra Stiles Hubbard. He was a descendant of Massachusetts Colony legislator William Hubbard and historian William Hubbard. According to his mother, Hubbard took up the study of mathematics and mechanics at the age of nine. At an early age, he made a clock and a telescope. He was attracted to Yale College by Yale astronomer Ebenezer Porter Mason. He graduated from Yale with a Bachelor of Arts in 1843. He continued studying mathematics and astronomy at home.

== Career ==
Hubbard taught at a classical school in Southington. In 1844, he went to Philadelphia as an assistant to Sears Cook Walker at the High School Observatory. In the fall of 1844, he was appointed as computist for the latitude and longitude observations made on John C. Frémont's first expedition across the Rocky Mountains. Frémont, Alexander Dallas Bache, and Thomas Hart Benton advocated to Secretary of the Navy George Bancroft for Hubbard to receive an appointment as professor of mathematics in the United States Navy. He was commissioned on May 7, 1845, and was assigned to the United States Naval Observatory in Washington, D.C. He remained an officer of the observatory until his death.

Hubbard's first computation at the observatory was the determination of the zodiacs (astronomical coordinates) of all known asteroids, except four previously published in Germany. He researched the Great Comet of 1843. He discovered the third comet of 1843 in December 1843 at the New Haven Observatory following the initial discovery of the comet by M. H. Faye in Paris. He worked with John H. C. Coffin to develop a system of zone observations that allowed three instruments to be used simultaneously at the observatory. This system was used from 1846 to 1850. In 1846, he began investigating Biela's Comet. He also investigated the fourth comet of 1825. In November 1848, he presented the zodiacs of asteroids Vesta, Astrea, Hebe, Flora, and Metis to the Smithsonian Institution. In 1849, he prepared the zodiacs of Hygea, Parthenope, Clip, and Egeria. He also conducted research on the parallax of Vega (Alpha Lyrae). In 1847, he confirmed the orbit of the planet Neptune using the 1795 observations of Michel Lefrançois de Lalande. One of his last studies was related to the magnetism of iron ships.

In 1845, Hubbard was elected as a member of the National Institute of Washington. In 1852, he was made a fellow of the American Philosophical Society. He was appointed by the U.S. Congress as one of the original members of the National Academy of Sciences. In the summers, he helped sick and wounded soldiers of the American Civil War in Washington, D.C., by writing letters for them.

== Publications ==
Hubbard published in Washington Observations. Hubbard wrote over 210 columns for the Astronomical Journal. He served as its acting editor twice during the absence of Benjamin Apthorp Gould.

His publications included:

- "The Orbit of the Great Comet of 1843", Astronomical Journal
- "On the Orbit of Biela's Comet in 1845-'6" (1853)
- "On the Orbit of the Fourth Comet of 1825", Astronomical Journal
- "Results of Additional Investigations respecting the two Nuclei of Biela's Comet" (1854)
- "On Biela's Comet" (1858), Astronomical Journal
- "Telescopes", Appleton's New American Cyclopaedia

== Personal life ==
Hubbard married Sarah E. L. Handy of Washington, D.C., on April 27, 1848. They had one child. His wife died in 1861. He was an elder of the Presbyterian Church. He was also city superintendent of Presbyterian Sunday schools in Washington, D.C.

Hubbard died of typhoid on August 16, 1863, at his mother's home in New Haven.

== Legacy ==
His relatives presented 14 quarto volumes of his manuscripts and calculations to Yale University.
