= Great January Comet of 1910 =

Non-periodic comet

C/1910 A1 (Great Daylight Comet of 1910)
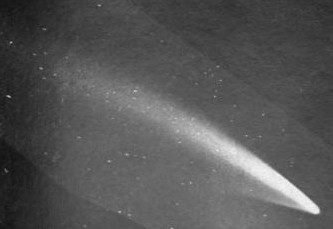
- C/1910 A1, the Daylight or Great January Comet, photograph from Lowell Observatory

Discovery
- Discovery date: 12 January 1910

Designations
- Alternative designations: 1910 I, 1910a

Orbital characteristics
- Epoch: 9 January 1910 (JD 2418680.5)
- Observation arc: 82 days
- Number of observations: 25
- Aphelion: ~1150 AU (inbound); ~900 AU (outbound)
- Perihelion: 0.12896 AU (19.292 million km)
- Semi-major axis: ~440 AU (epoch 2000)
- Eccentricity: 0.99978
- Orbital period: ~9,200 years (outbound)
- Inclination: 138.78°
- Last perihelion: 17 January 1910

Physical characteristics
- Mean radius: 1.67 km (1.04 mi) (Note: Calculated mean radius using the formula: $\log_{10}\,(\,R\,)\ =\;0.9 +\;0.13 (\,H\,)$ Where $\,H\,$ is the comet's absolute total magnitude (M1))
- Comet total magnitude (M1): 5.2
- Apparent magnitude: –5.0 (1910 apparition)

The Great January Comet of 1910, formally designated C/1910 A1 and often referred to as the Daylight Comet, was a comet that appeared in January 1910. It was already visible to the naked eye when it was first noticed, and many people independently "discovered" the comet. At its brightest, it outshone the planet Venus, and was possibly the brightest comet of the 20th century.

== Observational history ==
=== Discovery ===
The comet came to solar conjunction about 1 degree from the Sun on 17 December 1909 but was still about 1 AU from the Sun. In January, the comet brightened rather suddenly and was initially visible from the Southern Hemisphere only. A number of individuals claimed "discovery", but the comet is thought to have been first spotted by diamond miners in the Transvaal before dawn on 12 January 1910 when it was already a prominent naked-eye object of apparent magnitude −1.0, with a declination of −29 and so was best seen from the Southern Hemisphere.

The first person to study the comet properly was the Scottish astronomer Robert T. A. Innes at the Transvaal Observatory in Johannesburg on 17 January after he had been alerted two days earlier by the editor of a Johannesburg newspaper.

The comet reached perihelion on 17 January and was at then visible in daylight with the unaided eye. It had a magnitude of −5.0 because of the forward scattering of light. It came to solar conjunction a second time on 18 January 1910. Following perihelion, it declined in brightness but became a spectacular sight from the Northern Hemisphere in the evening twilight, its noticeably curved tail reaching up to 50 degrees by early February.

=== Halley's Comet and the Daylight Comet ===
The year 1910 saw considerable media interest in the predicted return of Halley's Comet, which reached perihelion on 20 April. The appearance of the Daylight Comet several months earlier therefore came as something of a surprise and made an extremely strong impression on an expectant public. When Halley's Comet returned again in 1986, many older people's accounts of having seen it in 1910 clearly referred to the Daylight Comet instead.

Owing to a "telephonic error", the comet was initially reported as being named Drake's Comet, but once the error was realised, the press afterwards referred to it as the Daylight Comet or Sunset Comet, as no single individual was credited with its discovery.

=== Panic ===
Newspapers in various cities reported people having been scared by the appearance of the comet. The Morning Post of Camden, New Jersey reported that similar scares happened in past years that comets had been seen. In Korea, many thought the comet would kill them all off. Some stopped going to work, just ate and drank and waited for the world to end.

== See also ==
- C/1975 V1 (West)
- C/2006 P1 (McNaught)
- C/2023 A3 (Tsuchinshan–ATLAS)
