= Comet Tsuchinshan–ATLAS =

Great Comet of 2024

C/2023 A3 (Tsuchinshan–ATLAS) (Great Comet of 2024)
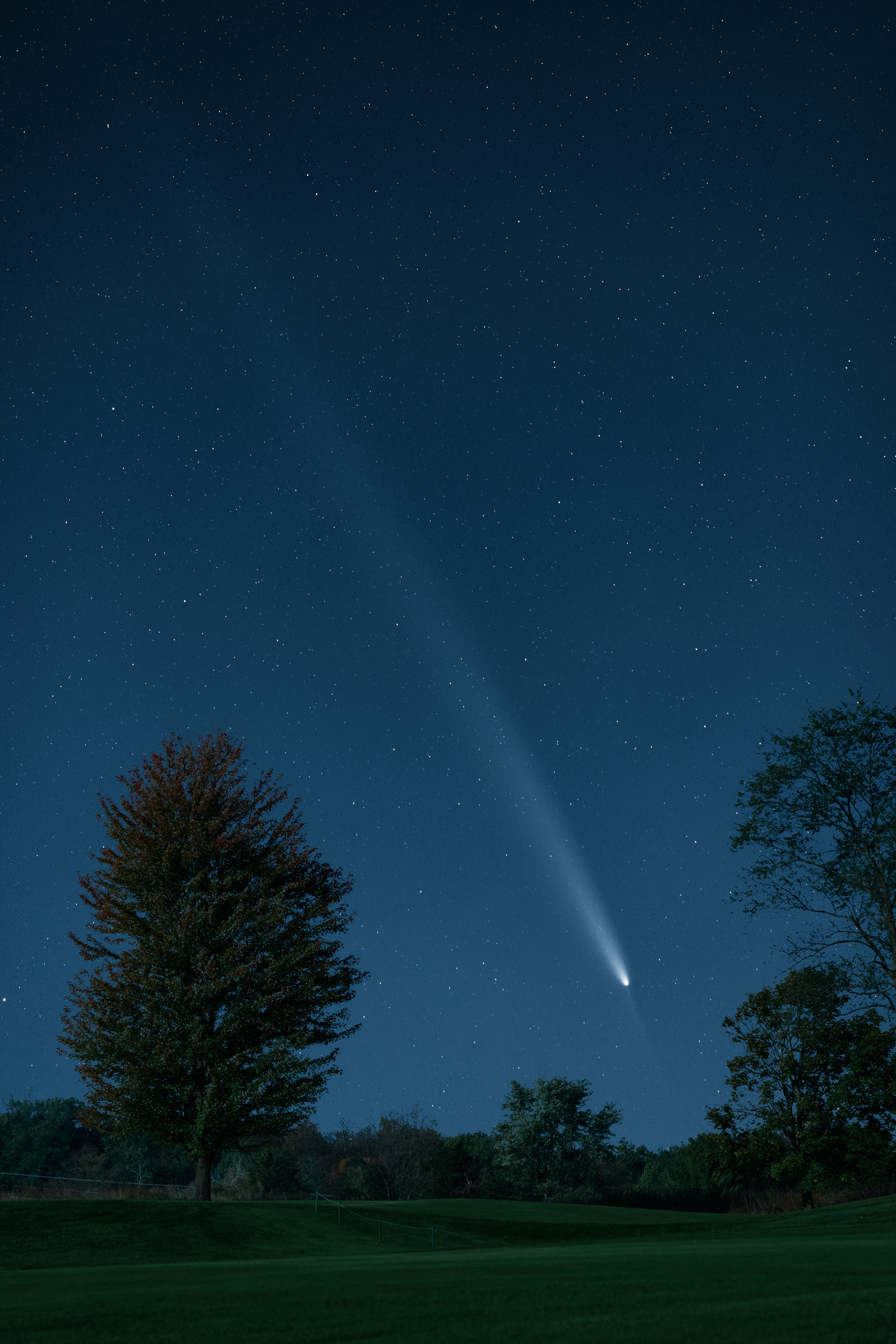
- Comet Tsuchinshan-ATLAS photographed from Ohio, USA on 17 October 2024

Discovery
- Discovery site: Purple Mountain Obs. ATLAS–SAAO (M22)
- Discovery date: 9 January 2023

Designations
- MPC designation: C/2023 A3
- Alternative designations: A10SVYR

Orbital characteristics
- Epoch: 10 February 2024 (JD 2460350.5)
- Observation arc: 3.5 years (1,280 days)
- Earliest precovery date: 9 April 2022
- Number of observations: 7240
- Aphelion: ≈97000 AU(inbound)
- Perihelion: 0.39143 AU
- Semi-major axis: ≈48000 AU (inbound)
- Eccentricity: 0.999992 (inbound); 1.000039 (outbound)
- Orbital period: millions of years (inbound); Ejection trajectory (outbound)
- Max. orbital speed: 67.33 km/s
- Inclination: 139.112°
- Longitude of ascending node: 21.559°
- Argument of periapsis: 308.491°
- Last perihelion: 27 September 2024
- T_{Jupiter}: –0.583
- Earth MOID: 0.27503 AU
- Jupiter MOID: 1.09559 AU

Physical characteristics
- Mean radius: <5.9 ± 0.2 km (3.67 ± 0.12 mi)
- Mass: (4.3±0.8)×10^{14} kg
- Geometric albedo: 0.04 (assumed)
- Comet total magnitude (M1): 6.5
- Comet nuclear magnitude (M2): 9.2 ± 0.3
- Apparent magnitude: –4.9 (2024 perihelion)

Comet Tsuchinshan–ATLAS, also known as the Great Comet of 2024 and formally designated as C/2023 A3, is a non-periodic comet from the Oort cloud discovered by the Purple Mountain Observatory in China on 9 January 2023 and independently found by ATLAS South Africa on 22 February 2023. The comet passed perihelion at a distance of 0.39 AU (58 million km; 36 million mi) on 27 September 2024, when it became visible to the naked eye. Tsuchinshan–ATLAS peaked at its brightest magnitude on 9 October, shortly after passing the Sun, with an apparent magnitude of −4.9 per reported observations at the Comet Observation Database (COBS), making it the brightest comet observed in the Northern Hemisphere since Comet Hale–Bopp in 1997.

== Observational history ==
=== Discovery ===
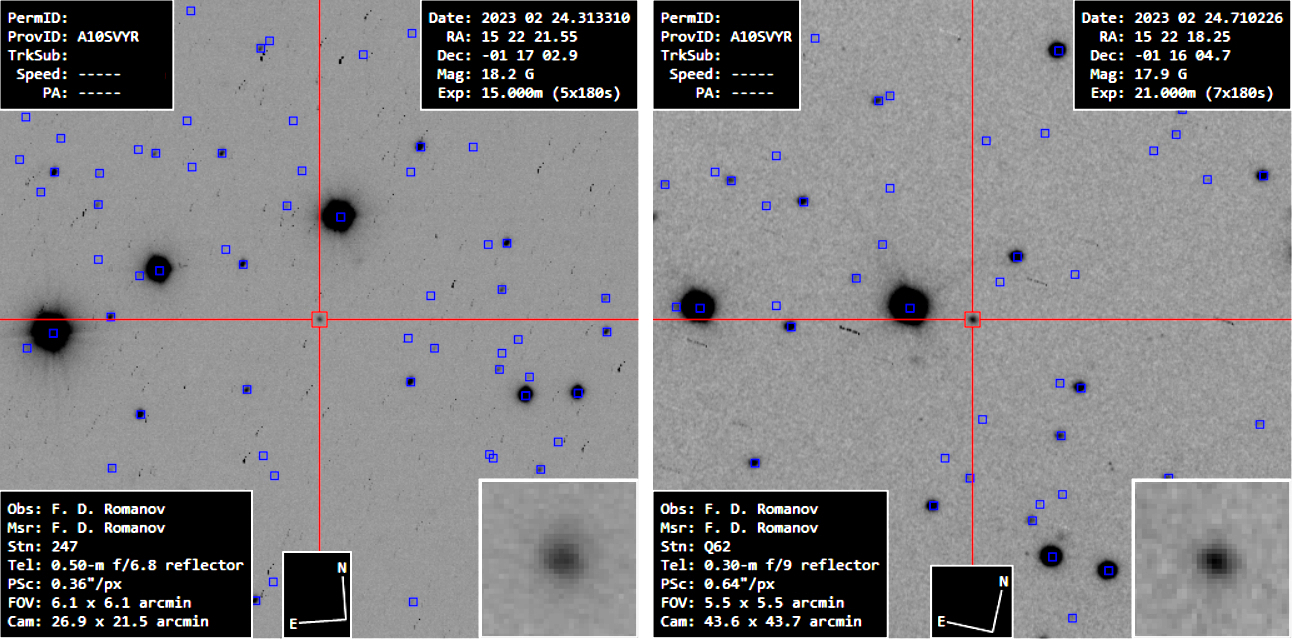
Images of comet C/2023 A3 (Tsuchinshan–ATLAS) obtained on 2023-02-24 at remote telescopes by an amateur astronomer

The systematic search performed by the Asteroid Terrestrial-impact Last Alert System detected an asteroidal object with an estimated magnitude of 18.1 in images taken on 22 February 2023, using the 0.5 m f/2 Schmidt reflector at the Sutherland Observatory in South Africa, when the comet was about 7.3 AU (1.09 billion km; 680 million mi) from the Sun. After the first orbit calculations, it was noticed that it was the same as an 18.7 magnitude object reported to the Minor Planet Center by the Purple Mountain Observatory (Zijinshan in Pinyin, Tsuchinshan in postal romanization, the latter form being traditional for discoveries from this observatory) which was detected in images taken on 9 January 2023. It had been entered in the objects awaiting confirmation list, but had been removed on 30 January 2023 after no follow up observations were reported and the uncertainty on its predicted position grew to the point that it was considered lost. Based on the naming conventions for comets, it received the name of both observatories.

The object was subsequently detected in older images taken by the Zwicky Transient Facility (ZTF) in Palomar Observatory on 22 December 2022, when it had a magnitude of 19.2–19.6. These deeper and better resolved images also revealed it had a very condensed coma and a small straight tail 10 arcseconds in length, indicating it was a comet already active at a distance of 7.9 AU (1.18 billion km) from the Sun. More evidence of cometary activity was later reported by Hidetaka Sato, M. Mattiazzo and Cristóvão Jacques. A visible dust tail became visible by June 2023, with its coma color showed a predominantly red color at the time.

=== Towards perihelion ===
A time-lapse of comet C/2023 A3 (Tsuchinshan–ATLAS) captured on 10 May 2024

By January 2024, the comet had brightened to an apparent magnitude of 13.6 and according to Bob King, author in Sky & Telescope magazine, was visible through 15-inch telescopes at ×142 magnification. The comet was then moving through the constellations of Libra and Virgo. By the end of April, it had brightened to about magnitude 10 and could be observed through small telescopes, showing a short tail. The spectrum of the comet on 31 May 2024, when the comet was 2.33 AU (349 million km) from the Sun, indicated strong cyanide emission and that the comet is carbon depleted. The comet had a large dust-to-gas ratio.

In May and June, the brightening rate of the comet slowed, with the comet staying between magnitudes 10 and 11, while a dusty tail measuring 5 to 15 arcminutes long was observed visually to extend eastward. Astronomer Zdenek Sekanina suggested that this indicates that the comet nucleus had been fragmenting, with the fragmentation starting in late March, as indicated by an increase in the brightening rate and the subsequent decrease in dust production, the narrow teardrop-shaped dust tail, and non-gravitional changes in the orbit. He predicted that the comet would disintegrate before perihelion. Observations of the comet with TRAPPIST robotic telescope indicated that dust production reached a minimum in May, when the comet was near a phase angle of zero, and started to increase again one month later, while gas production rates increased slowly throughout that period. In mid-June, the comet entered the constellation of Leo, in the evening sky. In early July, a faint ion tail measuring about one and half degree in length was observed photographically. After mid-July, the comet was lost in the Sun's glare until September. In August, the comet was observed by STEREO spacecraft brightening steadily to an apparent magnitude of 7.

=== Perihelion ===
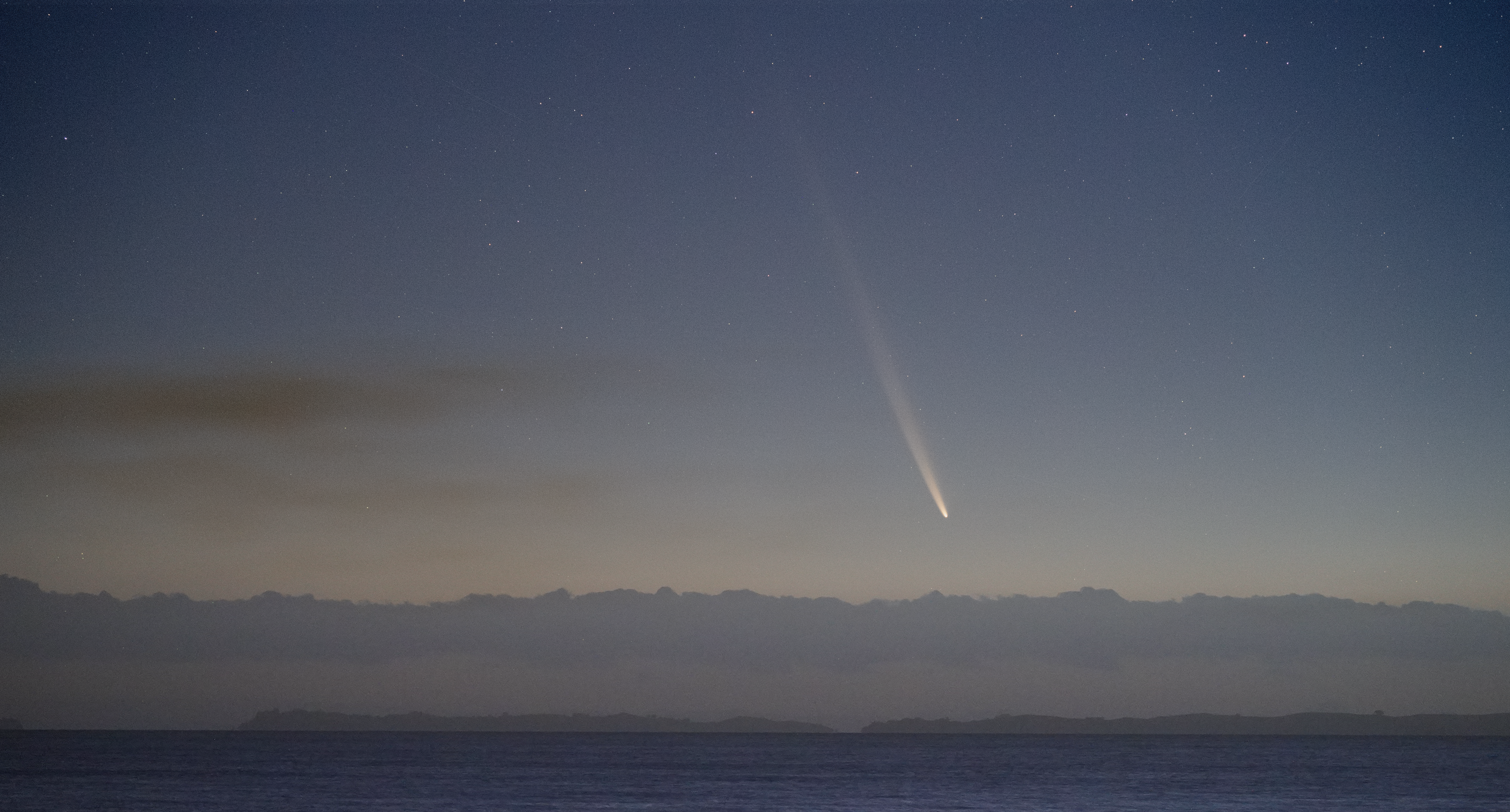
C/2023 A3 taken from Murrays Bay, Auckland, New Zealand, on 28 September 2024

The comet was recovered by Terry Lovejoy in the morning twilight on 11 September 2024, when it was located in the constellation of Sextans, at a magnitude of 5.5. The comet was spotted with the naked eye and photographed by astronaut Matthew Dominick on board the International Space Station (ISS) on 20 September, followed by fellow astronaut Donald Pettit two days later. The first naked eye observation of the comet from Earth was reported on 23 September, with the comet having an estimated magnitude of 3.3, while its tail was reported to be 2.5 degrees long when it was observed with binoculars.

During the last week of September, the comet was located in the dawn sky, better visible from the Southern Hemisphere, and it was predicted to have brightened to second magnitude. Perihelion took place on 27 September. By 1 October, the comet had brightened to magnitude 2 and its tail was estimated to be 10–12 degrees long. In early October, the comet's spectrum featured prominent sodium lines but it was depleted in carbon bearing species. After that, it moved again in conjunction with the Sun. On 4 October, the apparent magnitude was estimated to be 1.3. It is estimated that the comet reached its peak dust production rate of 10^{5} kg/sec during perihelion.

SOHO Coronagraph view of the comet

On 7 October, the comet entered the field of view of the SOHO Coronagraph, and continued to be visible until 11 October. On 9 October 2024, the comet was 3.5 degrees from the Sun. The comet was seen brightening to an apparent magnitude of −4.9 on that day, becoming one of the brightest comets of the past century. This also made the comet the brightest one observed from the Northern Hemisphere since Comet Hale–Bopp in 1997. The total magnitude within 5 arcminutes of the nucleus peaked at −2.9. It was the second-brightest comet viewed by SOHO since its launch in 1995, after Comet McNaught in 2007. No naked eye observations of the comet in daylight were reported, indicating a peak visual magnitude of −2 to −3, while observations of the comet on 9 October with binoculars indicated an apparent magnitude of −3.

The comet was recovered in the evening sky on 10 October, and during the next several days, it became visible to the naked eye. It made its closest approach to Earth on 12 October, at a distance of 71 million km (44 million mi). On that day, the comet was estimated to have an apparent magnitude of 0, and its tail was estimated to be 4 degrees long. The comet after that became dimmer, as it moves away from both the Earth and the Sun, however as the elongation became higher, it was easier to spot, despite the brightening Moon. Earth crossed the orbital plane of the comet on 14 October, and as a result, an anti-tail was observed. On 16 October, the tail was estimated to be over 20 degrees long photographically. The comet faded quickly and by 20 October, it had dimmed to 4th magnitude; however, the tail was reported to be 10 degrees long with averted vision under dark skies and 17.5 degrees long photographically. By 2 November, the comet had faded to below magnitude +6 and was no longer visible to the naked eye.

Between 22 and 26 October 2024, the comet was observed with the Échelle spectrograph FLECHAS, which is operated at the 90 cm (35 in) telescope of the observatory of the Friedrich Schiller University Jena. In the recorded spectra of the comet, strong emission lines of C_{2}, NH_{2}, atomic oxygen and sodium were detected in the wavelength range between 500–700 nm. A significant decrease in the strength of the sodium emission lines was observed during the observation period. In further spectra of the comet, which were taken with FLECHAS on 3 November 2024, sodium could no longer be detected in emission.

On 21 October and again on 11 November, the comet was formally dubbed the Great Comet of 2024 by NASA.

== Brightness predictions ==
When first discovered, the comet was predicted to reach a total magnitude of +3 during perihelion, assuming an absolute magnitude (H) of 7 and 2.5n = 8, when it would have a small solar elongation. Better visibility was predicted about three weeks after perihelion, in mid-October, when it would be around fourth magnitude. Gideon van Buitenen estimated that the comet would reach a magnitude of 0.9 during perihelion and −0.2 at the time of closest approach to Earth, assuming H = 5.2 and 2.5n = 10, and would benefit from the effects of forward scattering.

Revised data from June 2024 suggested that the comet would brighten to an apparent magnitude of 2.2, assuming H = 6 and 2.5n = 7.5, which is the average brightening rate of long-period comets in the inner Solar System. However, the comet was expected to be at least one magnitude brighter due to the effects of forward scattering, which could boost the brightness by several magnitudes around the peak of the effect on 9.8 October 2024. More calculations from early September indicated that accounting for forward scattering, the comet would be brighter than magnitude 0 between 5 and 13 October and peak at over −4 on 9 October, brightening by almost 6 magnitudes due to forward scattering.

== Orbit ==
Animation of C/2023 A3 around Sun C/2023 A3 · Sun · Mercury · Venus · Earth · Mars

The comet has a retrograde orbit, lying at an inclination of 139°. Τhe comet had its perihelion on 27 September 2024, at a distance of 0.391 AU. Τhe closest approach to Earth was on 12 October 2024, at a distance of 0.47 AU. The comet does not approach close to the giant planets of the Solar System. The orbit is weakly bound to the Sun before entering the planetary region of the Solar System. Due to planetary perturbations, the outbound orbit will become hyperbolic. This weakly hyperbolic trajectory may or may not result in the comet being ejected from the Solar System. It is expected to be 200 AU from the Sun in the year 2237.

C/2023 A3 closest Earth approach on 12 October 2024
Date and time of closest approach	Earth distance (AU)	Sun distance (AU)	Velocity relative to Earth (km/s)	Velocity relative to Sun (km/s)	Uncertainty region (3-sigma)	Constellation	Moon illumination	Reference
2024 October 12, 15:18 ± 15 min	0.47241 AU (70.672 million km; 43.913 million mi; 183.85 LD)	0.55619 AU (83.205 million km; 51.701 million mi; 216.45 LD)	80.5	56.5	±7,000 km	Virgo	70%	

Positions of the comet C/2023 A3 near 2024 perihelion

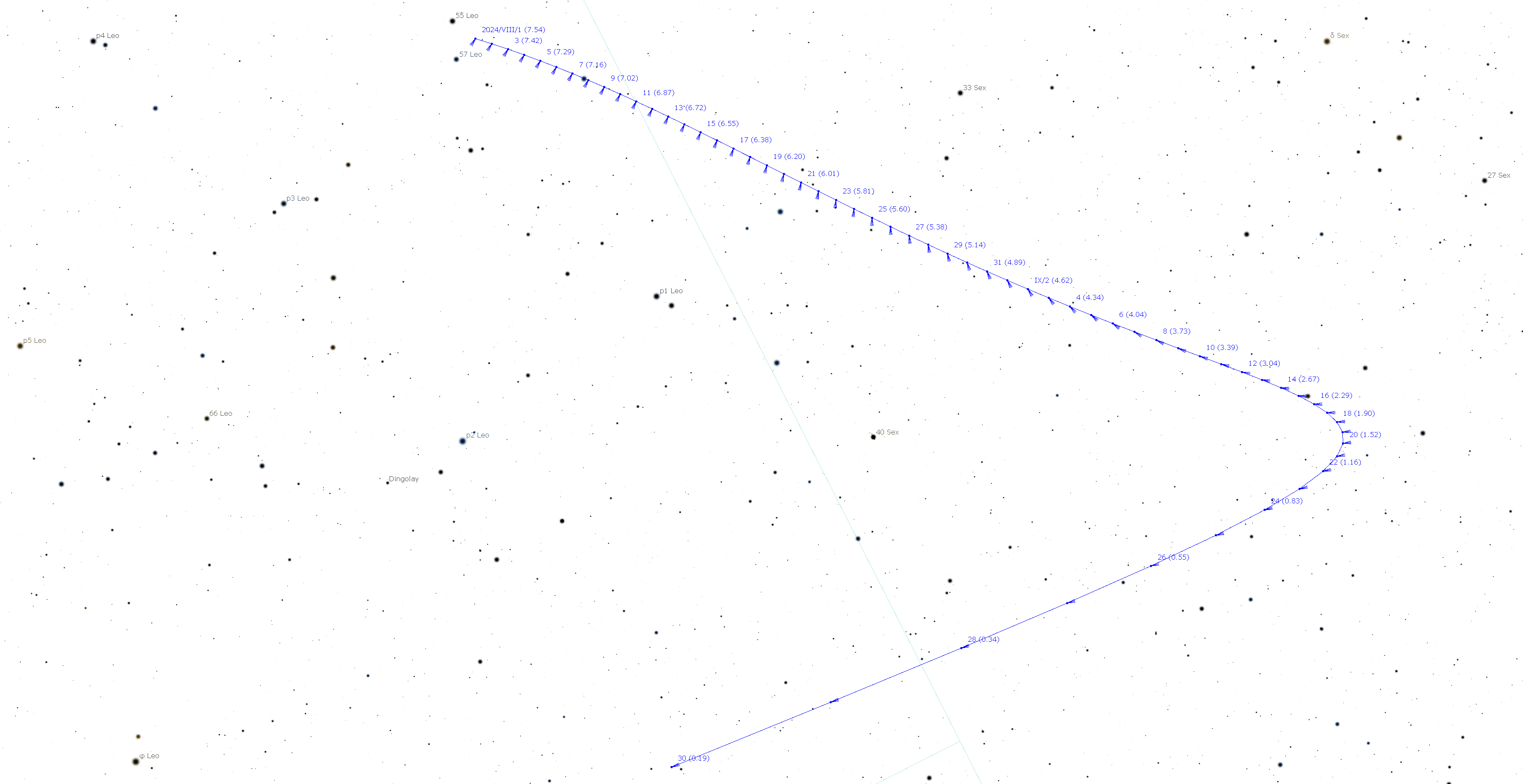
The position of comet C/2023 A3 in August and September 2024 with the expected apparent magnitudes. The comet is located in the constellation Leo between the two stars 55 and 57 Leonis about six degrees south of the ecliptic at the beginning of August and then moves towards the constellation Sextans. With increasing apparent brightness, it turns back toward the constellation Leo in the second half of September at maximum southern ecliptic latitude (just under 14 degrees of arc).

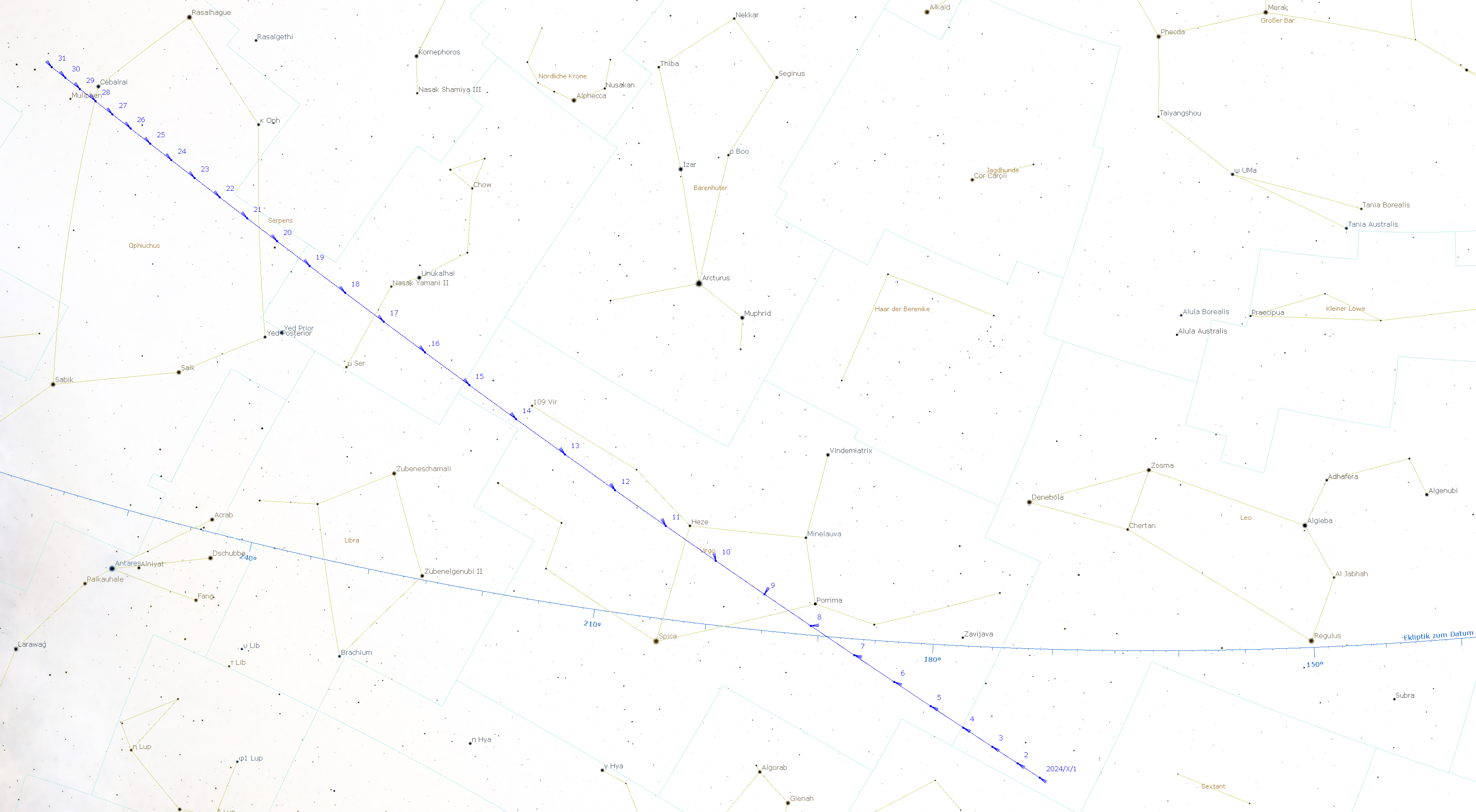
The position of comet C/2023 A3 in October 2024. The comet is located in the southernmost tip of the constellation Leo about ten degrees south of the ecliptic and moves in the first half of the month with decreasing apparent brightness across the constellation Virgo. It then moves into the western head of the constellation Serpens Caput, and then moves across the constellation Ophiuchus. By the end of the month, the comet reaches a northern ecliptic latitude of just over 27 degrees of arc. Therefore, in the second half of October the comet should be well visible on the western horizon after sunset.

== Observed changes ==
Views of Comet Tsuchinshan–ATLAS before and after its closest approach to Earth.

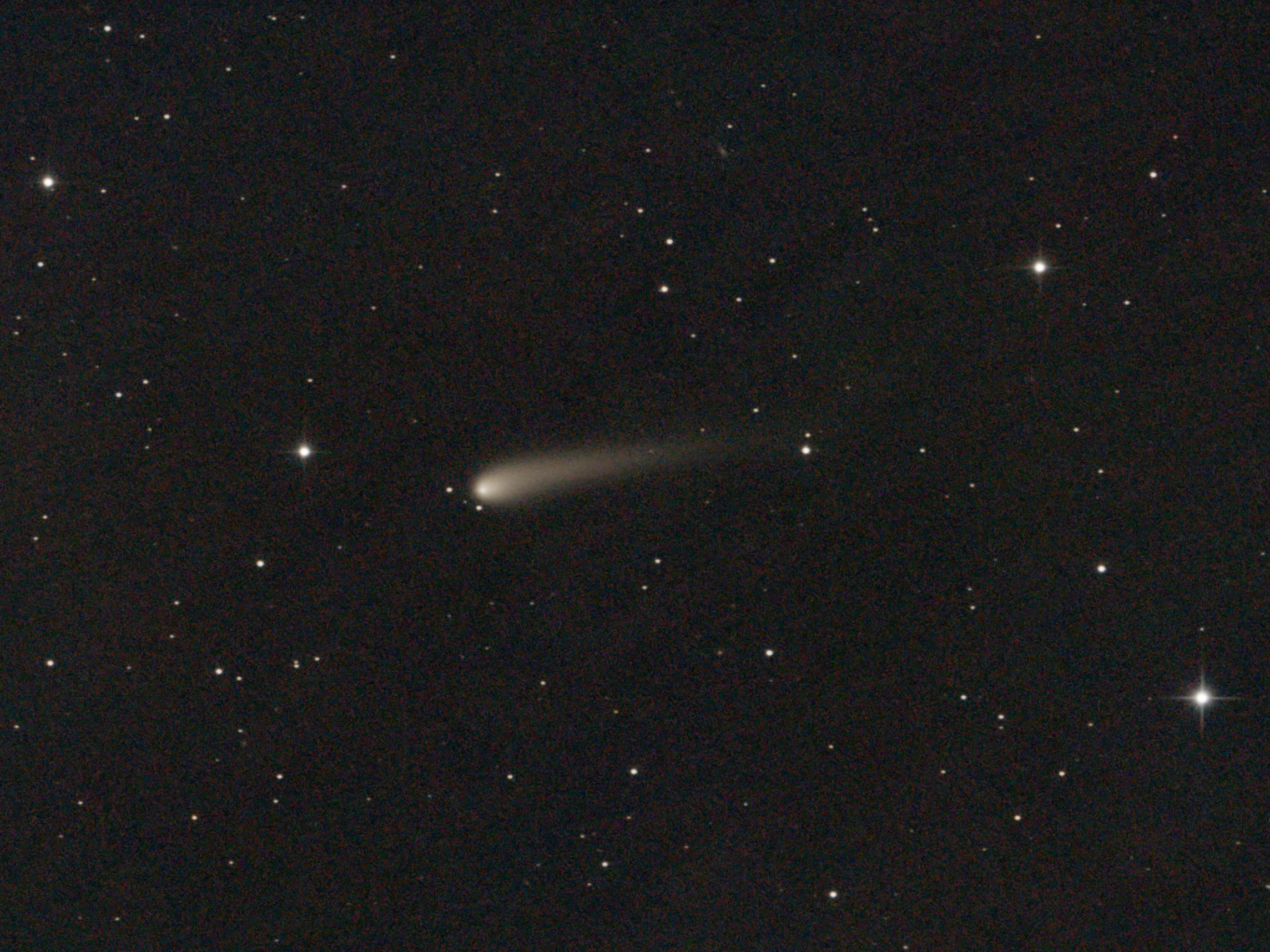
Telescopic view on 10 June 2024

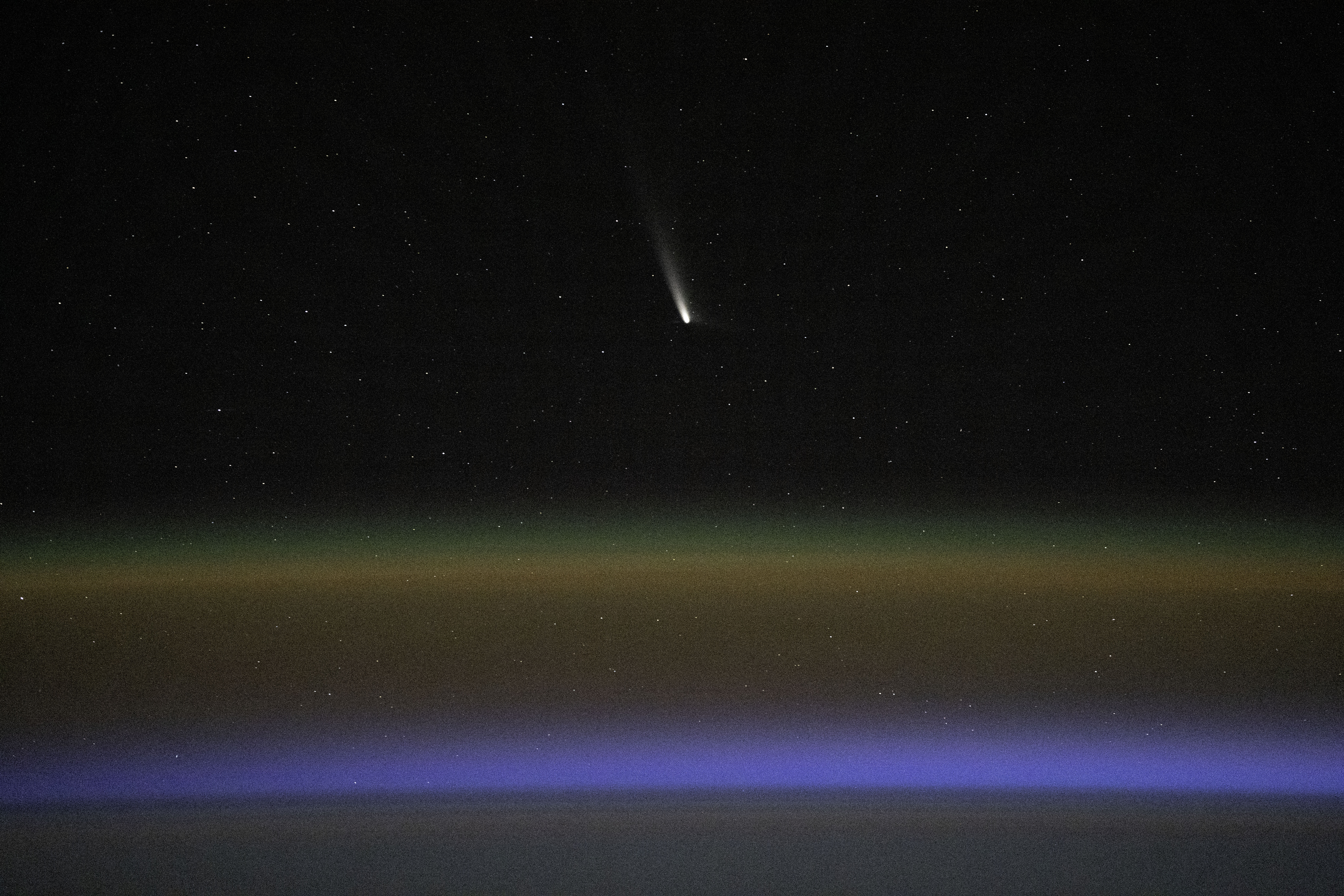
200mm telephoto lens view on 22 September 2024 from the ISS

151mm telephoto view on 28 September 2024, in Chile

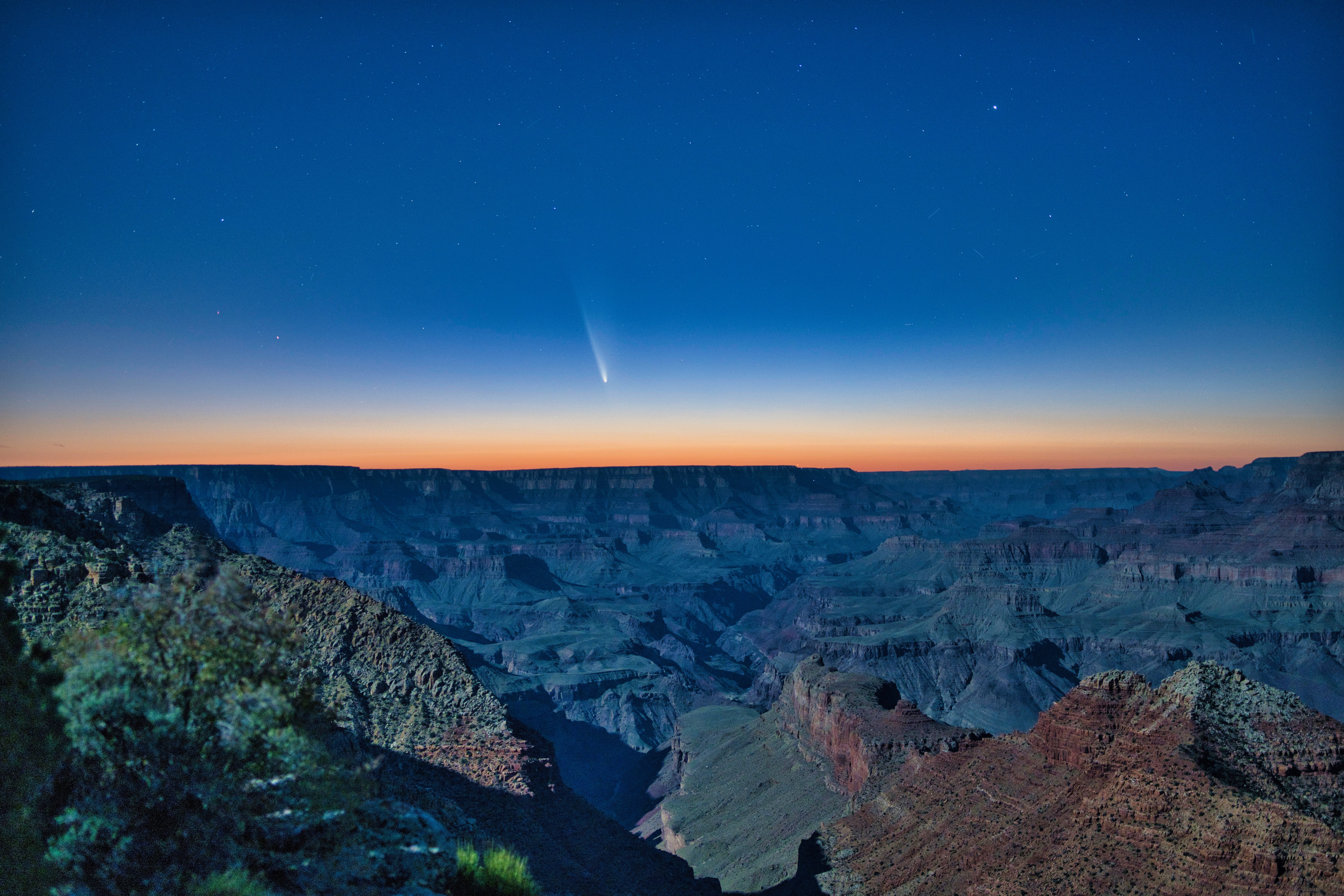
On 12 October at 19:54 from the Grand Canyon, Arizona, United States.

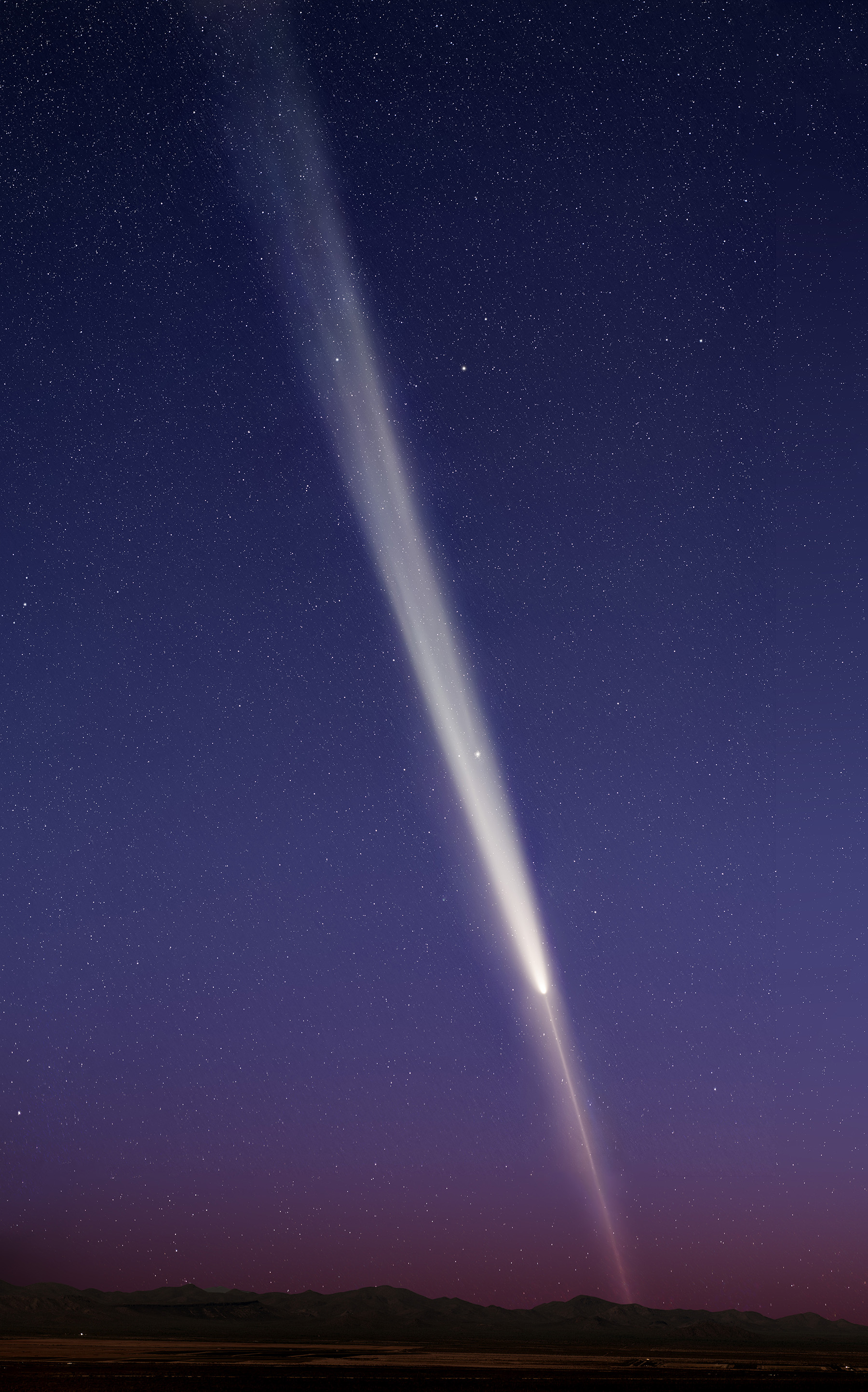
Camera view on 14 October 2024 (with a prominent "anti-tail") from Tucson, Arizona

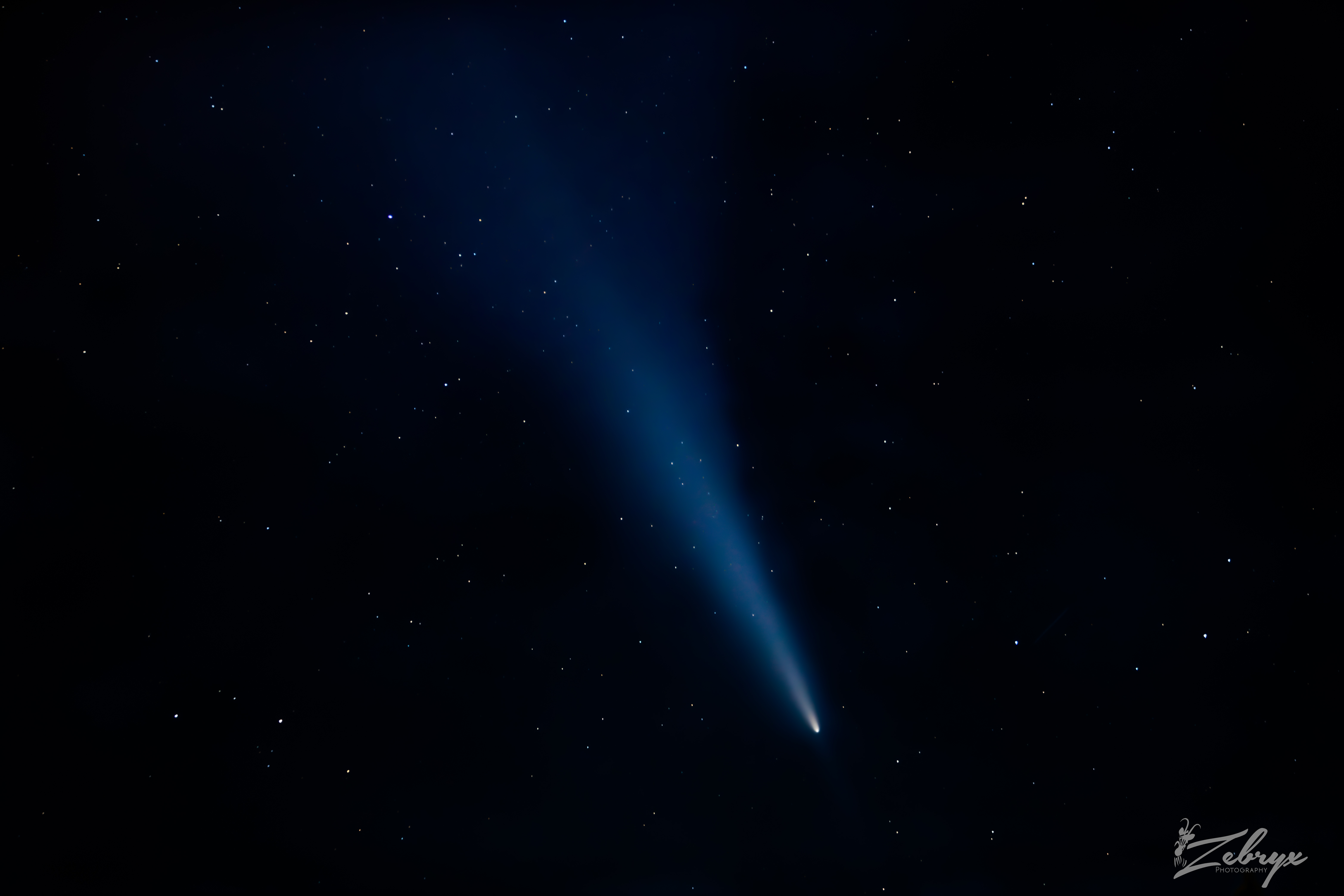
110mm telephoto view on 17 October 2024 over Virginia

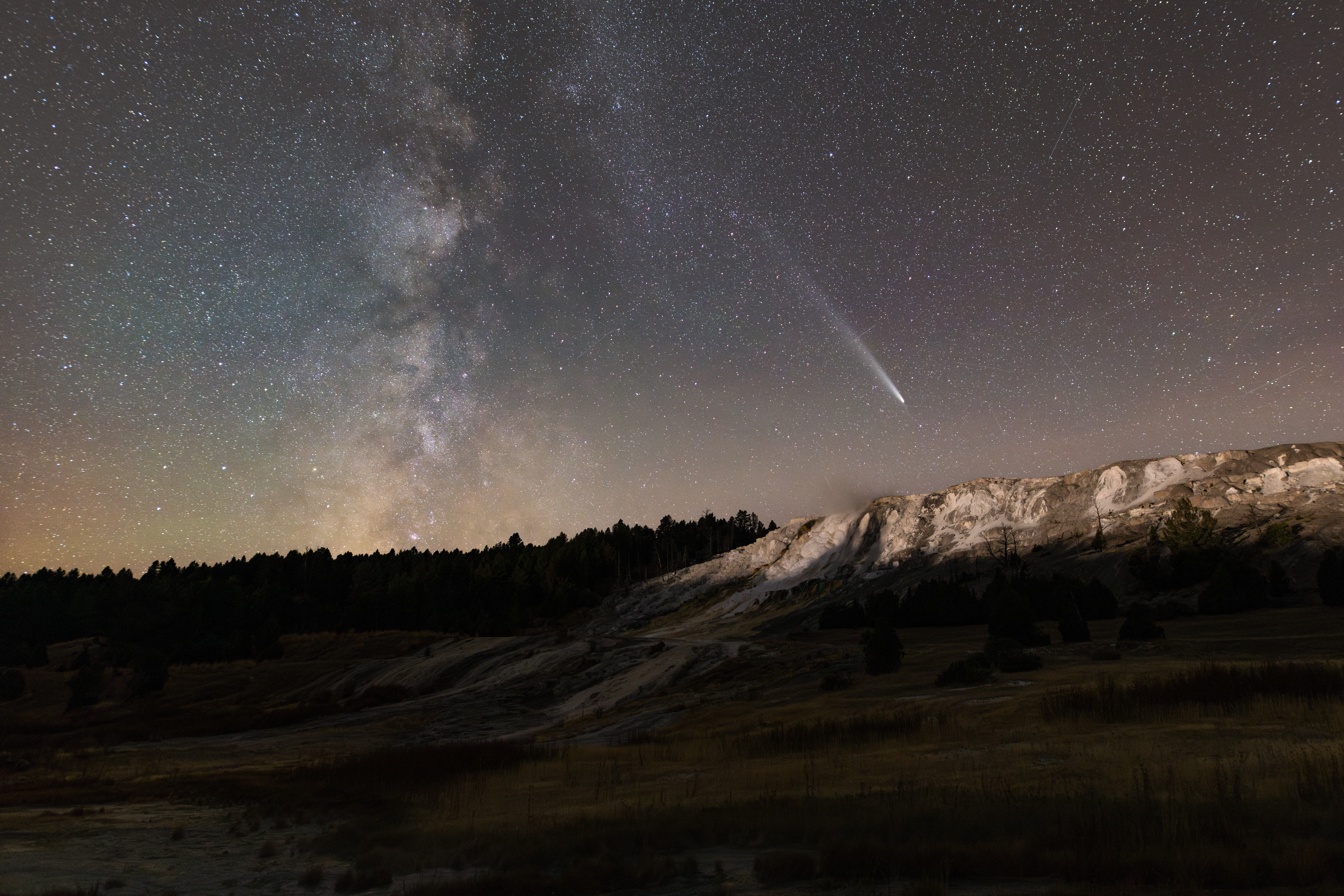
On 20 October at 20:16 from Yellowstone National Park

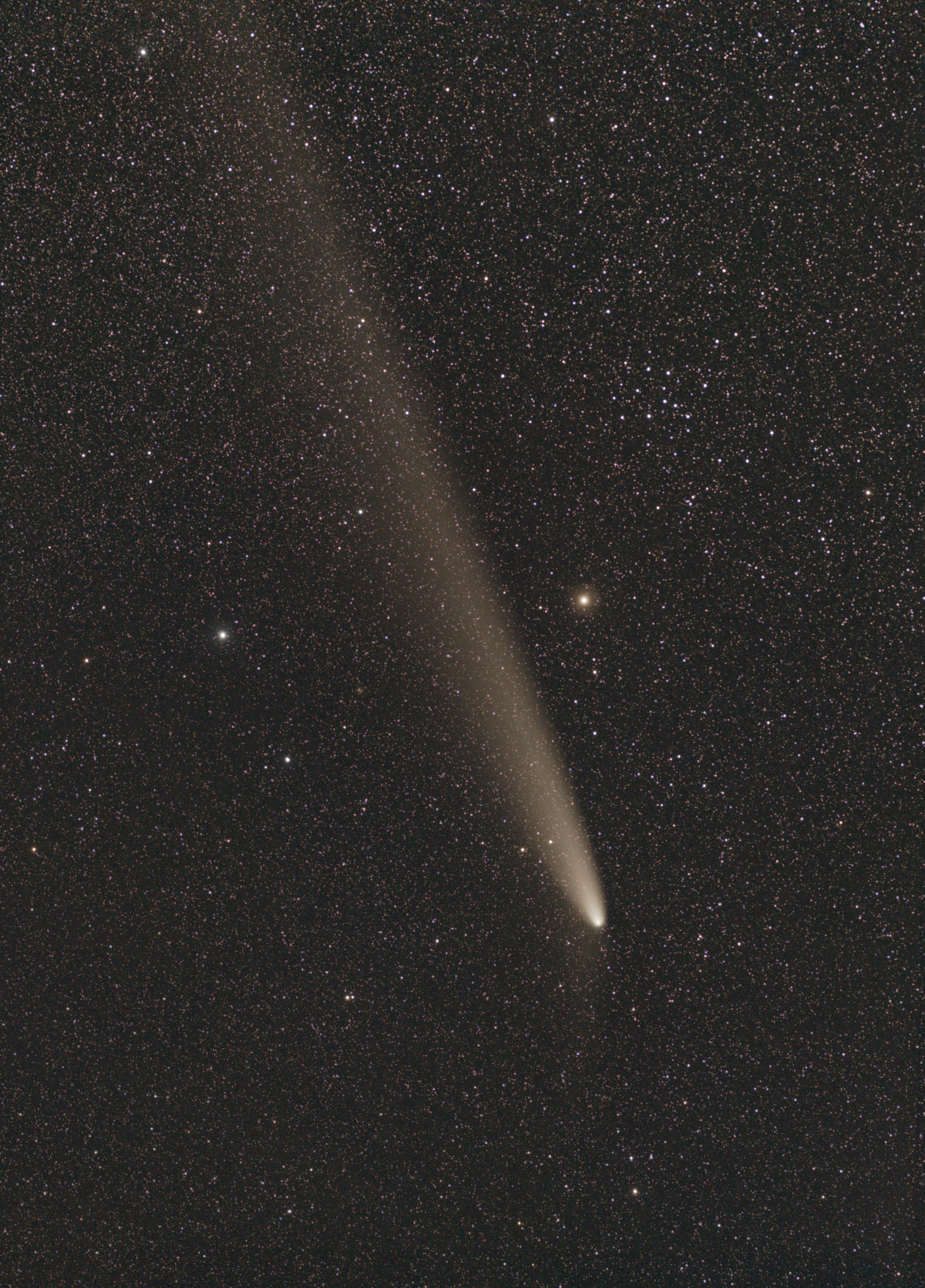
137mm telephoto view on 27 October 2024 from Crete, Greece

== See also ==
- C/1956 R1 (Arend–Roland) − another bright comet with prominent anti-tail. Also the Great Comet of 1957.
- C/2024 G3 (ATLAS) – a comet that also became bright in January 2025, three months after Tsuchinshan–ATLAS. Also known as the Great Comet of 2025.
- C/2024 S1 (ATLAS) – a Kreutz sungrazer comet that was expected to be visible to the naked eye two weeks after Tsuchinshan–ATLAS but disintegrated instead
- Great comet
