= Southern Comet of 1947 =

Non-periodic comet

C/1947 X1 (Southern Comet of 1947)
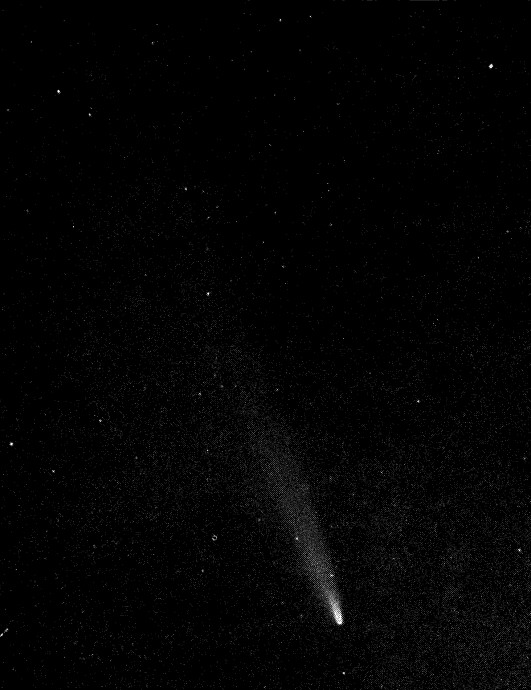
- The comet photographed by Carlos A. Etchecopar on 14 December 1947

Discovery
- Discovery date: 7–8 December 1947

Designations
- Alternative designations: 1947n 1947 XII

Orbital characteristics
- Epoch: 19 December 1947 (JD 2432538.5)
- Observation arc: 25–38 days
- Number of observations: 11–29
- Aphelion: ~1,400 AU (A); ~590 AU (B)
- Perihelion: 0.110 AU
- Semi-major axis: 700 AU (A); 300 AU (B)
- Eccentricity: 0.99984 (A); 0.99963 (B)
- Orbital period: ~18,500 years (A); ~5,100 years (B)
- Inclination: 138.51°
- Longitude of ascending node: 337.31°
- Argument of periapsis: 196.18°
- Last perihelion: 2 December 1947
- T_{Jupiter}: –0.301 (A) –0.291 (B)
- Earth MOID: 0.255 AU
- Jupiter MOID: 0.047 AU

Physical characteristics
- Mean radius: 1.24 km (0.77 mi) (Note: Calculated mean radius using the formula: $\log_{10}\,(\,R\,)\ =\;0.9 +\;0.13 (\,H\,)$ Where $\,H\,$ is the comet's absolute total magnitude (M1))
- Comet total magnitude (M1): 6.2
- Apparent magnitude: –5.0 (1947 apparition)

The Southern Comet of 1947 (also known with the designations C/1947 X1, 1947 XII, and 1947n) was a bright comet that became visible in the Southern Hemisphere in December 1947. At that point, it was the brightest comet seen in two decades and is one of the brightest comets seen since 1935, with an estimated maximum apparent magnitude of −3.

== Observational history ==
The comet passed from its perihelion on 2 December 1947, at a distance of 0.11 AU from the Sun, while closest approach to Earth was on 7 December, at a distance of 0.85 AU. The approach geometry was such that the comet could have been too faint to be discovered as it approached the Sun. After the first days of October, the comet approached rapidly the Sun and despite getting brighter, it was difficult to observe. On perihelion date, it is estimated that the comet was located 6 degrees at the Sun in the morning sky. Then it moved again in conjunction with the Sun and entered the evening sky.

The comet was discovered in evening twilight by many different observers on 8 December 1947, however there were unconfirmed reports from Cape Colony that it was spotted on 7 December. There is a report from Horsham, Australia, that the comet was seen in daylight about an hour before sunset. Harold Pallot, who taught astronomy in the local school, estimated the magnitude of the comet to be at least −5. The tail of the comet upon discovery was estimated by John Paraskevopoulos to be at least 25 degrees in length. The next day Paraskevopoulos estimated the magnitude of the comet to be +1.

Jorge Bobone, from the National Astronomical Observatory in Cordoba, Argentina, observed the comet telescopically on 10 December and noted that it had two nuclei 6.3 arcseconds apart. Zdenek Sekanina estimated that the nuclei were separated on 30 November 1947. On 11 December the comet reached its southernmost declination, at −35°. By mid December, the comet was estimated to have a magnitude of 4 to 5, while Paraskevopoulos estimated it to be 2.5–3. The tail was estimated to be 1.5 degrees long, it was made of three components and appeared ragged. The two nuclei were about 10 arcseconds apart, as observed by Willem Hendrik van den Bos.

The comet continued to fade rapidly and was last seen by naked eye on 25 December, while by the end of the month its magnitude was estimated to be around 8. The nuclei were still observable, being about 17 arcseconds apart in a plate obtained on 31 December. The comet was last detected on 20 January 1948 by George Van Biesbroeck.
