= Jakob Philipp Wolfers =

German astronomer and mathematician

- Born: 31 May 1803; Minden, Prussia
- Died: 22 April 1878 (aged 74); Berlin, Prussia
- Education: University of Greifswald
- Occupations: Mathematician, astronomer

Jakob Philipp Wolfers (31 May 1803, Minden – 22 April 1878, Berlin) was a German astronomer and mathematician.

== Biography ==
Jakob Philipp Wolfers was born on 31 May 1803 in Minden. After attending high school in his hometown, he first studied construction in Berlin but soon turned to mathematics. Johann Franz Encke, director of the observatory of the Academy of Sciences in Berlin, recruited him in 1824 as a collaborator for the calculations of the Berlin Astronomical Yearbook; he remained in this position until 1864.

In 1836, he received his doctorate from the University of Greifswald and in 1852, the title of professor in Berlin.

Wolfer's published work on geometry, series expansion (mainly in Grunert's Archive of Mathematics and Physics), and computational astronomy (mainly in the Astronomy Newspaper). He edited the Tabulae Regiomontanae, begun by Friedrich Wilhelm Bessel and continued by Julius Zech, for the period from 1860 to 1880. He also edited two sheets as part of the Bessel project Academic Star map. He also edited two sheets as part of a project Berliner Akademische Sternkarten.

He made a special contribution to the publication of Leonhard Euler's Mechanics in German and the first German translation of Isaac Newton's Principia Mathematica.

Furthermore, as a member of the Society for Geography in Berlin, he published numerous geographical and meteorological works. Wolfers was one of Alexander von Humboldt's most important correspondents.

== Selected works ==
=== Publications ===
- Tabulae Reductionum observationum astronomicarum annis 1860 usque ad 1880 respondentes auctore J. Ph. Wolfers – Additae sunt: Tabulae Regiomontanae annis 1850 usque ad 1860 respondentes ab Ill. Zech continuatae. Ferd. Duemmler, Berlin 1858.
  (Digitalisat)

=== Translations ===
- Leonhard Euler's MECHANICS or Analytical Presentation of the Science of Motion with Annotations and Explanations, edited by J. Ph. Wolfers. C. A. Koch's Verlagshandlung, Greifswald 1853.

(Digitalisat)

- Sir Isaac Newton's Mathematical Principles of Natural Science – With remarks and explanations, edited by Prof. Dr. J. Ph. Wolfers. Verlag von Robert Oppenheim, Berlin 1872.

(Wikisource)

=== Literature ===
- Siegmund Guenther in: Jakob Philipp Wolfers in Allgemeine Deutsche Biographie (ADB). Band 44, Duncker & Humblot, Leipzig 1898, S. 6 f.
