= Charles Messier =

18th- and 19th-century French astronomer

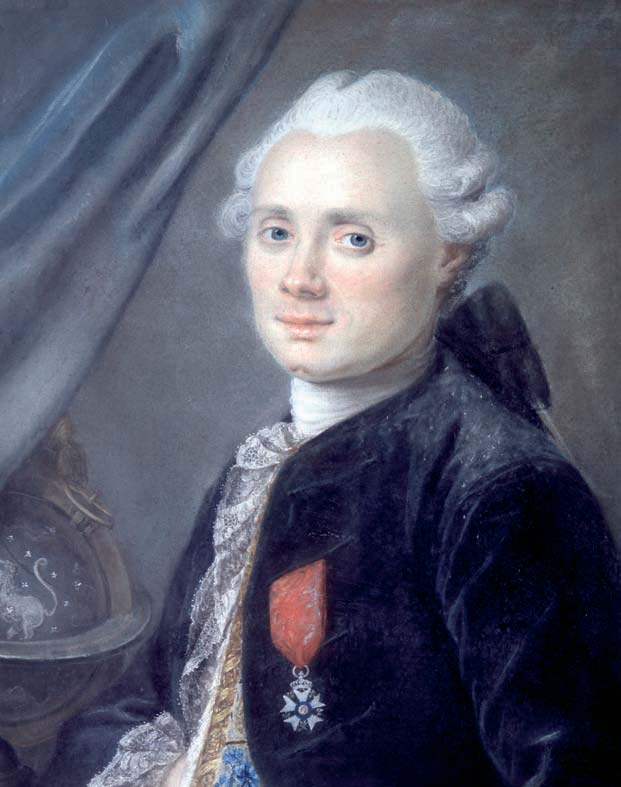
- Charles Messier, c. 1770
- Born: 26 June 1730; Badonviller, France
- Died: 12 April 1817 (aged 86); Paris, France
- Known for: Messier catalogue
- Awards: Cross of the Legion of Honour
- Scientific career
- Fields: Astronomy

Signature
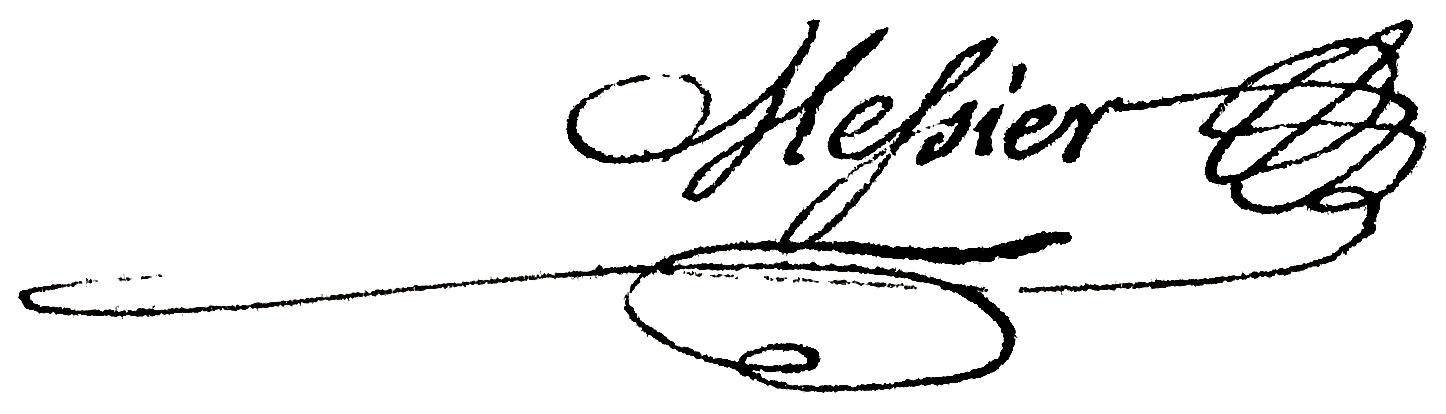

Charles Messier (French: [ʃaʁl me.sje]; 26 June 1730 – 12 April 1817) was a French astronomer. He published an astronomical catalogue consisting of 110 nebulae and star clusters, which came to be known as the Messier objects, referred to with the letter M and their number between 1 and 110. Messier's purpose for the catalogue was to help astronomical observers distinguish between permanent and transient visually diffuse objects in the sky.

== Early life ==
Messier was born in Badonviller in the Lorraine region of France, in 1730, the tenth of twelve children of Françoise B. Grandblaise and Nicolas Messier, a Court usher. Six of his brothers and sisters died while young, and his father died in 1741. Charles' interest in astronomy was stimulated by the appearance of the great six-tailed comet in 1744 and by an annular solar eclipse visible from his hometown on 25 July 1748.

== Career ==
In 1751, Messier entered the employ of Joseph Nicolas Delisle, the astronomer of the French Navy, who instructed him to keep careful records of his observations. Messier's first documented observation was that of the Mercury transit of 6 May 1753, followed by his observations journals at Cluny Hotel and at the French Navy observatories.

In 1764, Messier was made a fellow of the Royal Society; in 1769, he was elected a foreign member of the Royal Swedish Academy of Sciences; and on 30 June 1770, he was elected to the French Academy of Sciences. He was given the nickname "Ferret of Comets" by King Louis XV.

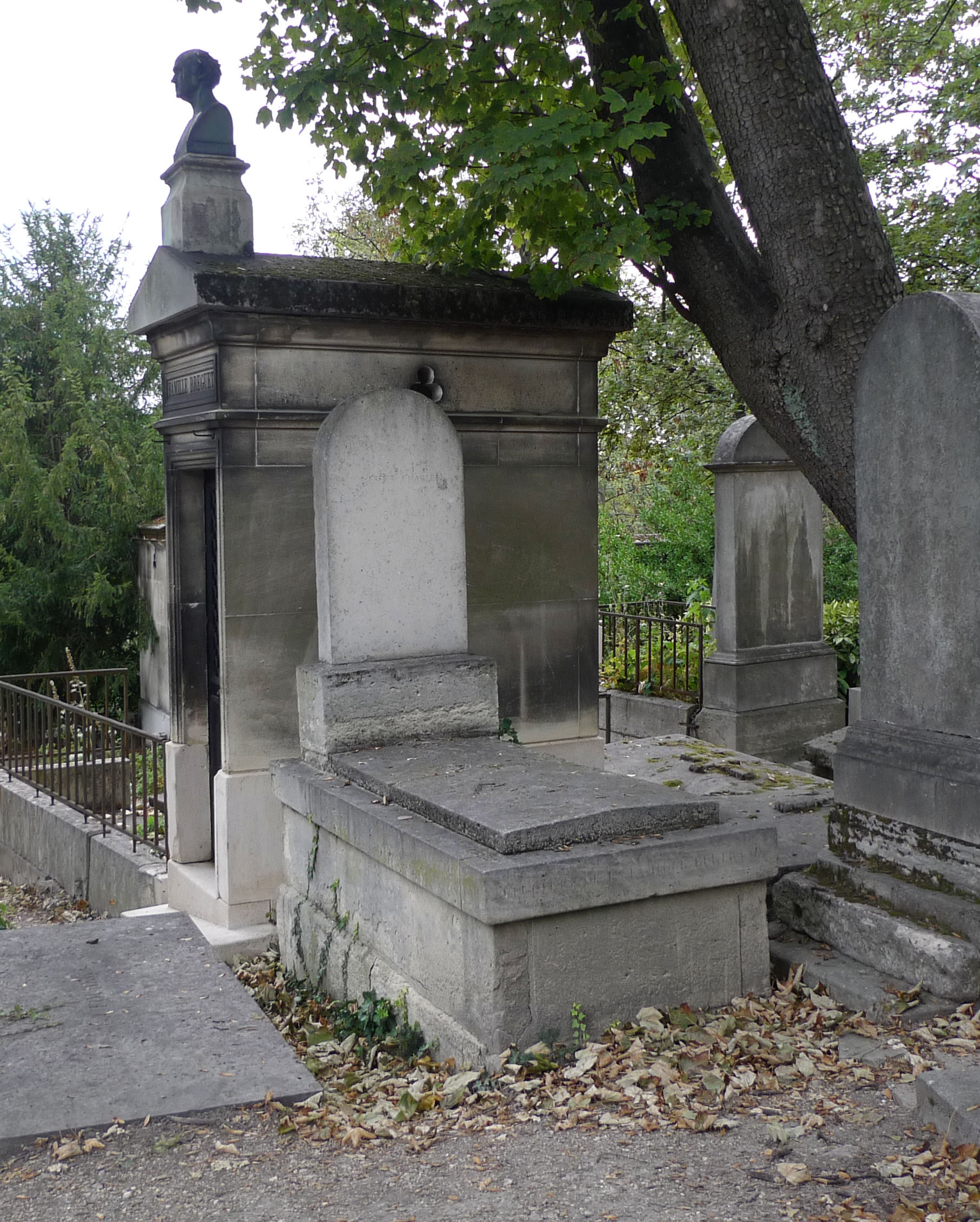
Messier's grave in Père Lachaise

Near the end of his life, Messier self-published a booklet connecting the great comet of 1769 to the birth of Napoleon, who was in power at the time of publishing. According to Maik Meyer:

As hard as it may seem to accept, the memoir is an ingratiation to Napoleon in order to receive attention and monetary support. It is full of servility and opportunism. Messier did not even refrain from utilizing astrology to reach his goal. Messier comes quickly to the point on the first page of the memoir, by stating that the beginning of the epoch of Napoleon the Great ... coincides with the discovery of one of the greatest comets ever observed.

Messier is buried in Père Lachaise Cemetery in the 20th arrondissement of Paris.

=== Messier catalogue ===
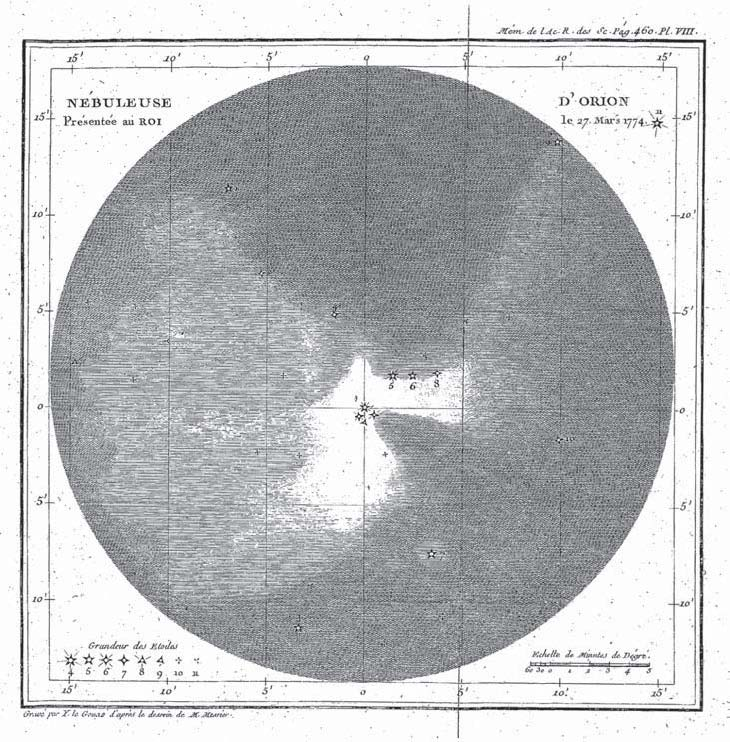
The Orion Nebula as drawn by Messier, and which he gave the designation M 42 in his catalogue

Messier's occupation as a comet hunter led him to continually come across fixed diffuse objects in the night sky which could be mistaken for comets. He compiled a list of them, in collaboration with his friend and assistant Pierre Méchain (who may have found at least 20 of the objects), to avoid wasting time sorting them out from the comets for which they were looking. The entries are now known to be 39 galaxies, 4 planetary nebulae, 7 other types of nebulae, 26 open star clusters and 29 globular star clusters.

Messier did his observing with a 100 mm (four-inch) refracting telescope from Hôtel de Cluny (now the Musée national du Moyen Âge), in downtown Paris, France. The list he compiled only contains objects found in the area of the sky Messier could observe, from the north celestial pole to a declination of about −35.7°. They are not organised scientifically by object type, or by location. The first version of Messier's catalogue contained 45 objects and was published in 1774 in the journal of the French Academy of Sciences in Paris. In addition to his own discoveries, this version included objects previously observed by other astronomers, with only 17 of the 45 objects being discovered by Messier himself. By 1780 the catalogue had increased to 80 objects.

The final version of the catalogue was published in 1781, in the 1784 issue of Connaissance des Temps. The final list of Messier objects had grown to 103. On several occasions between 1921 and 1966, astronomers and historians discovered evidence of another seven objects that were observed either by Messier or by Méchain, shortly after the final version was published. These seven objects, M 104 through M 110, are accepted by astronomers as "official" Messier objects.

The objects' Messier designations, from M 1 to M 110, are still used by professional and amateur astronomers today and their relative brightness makes them popular objects in the amateur astronomical community.

== Legacy ==
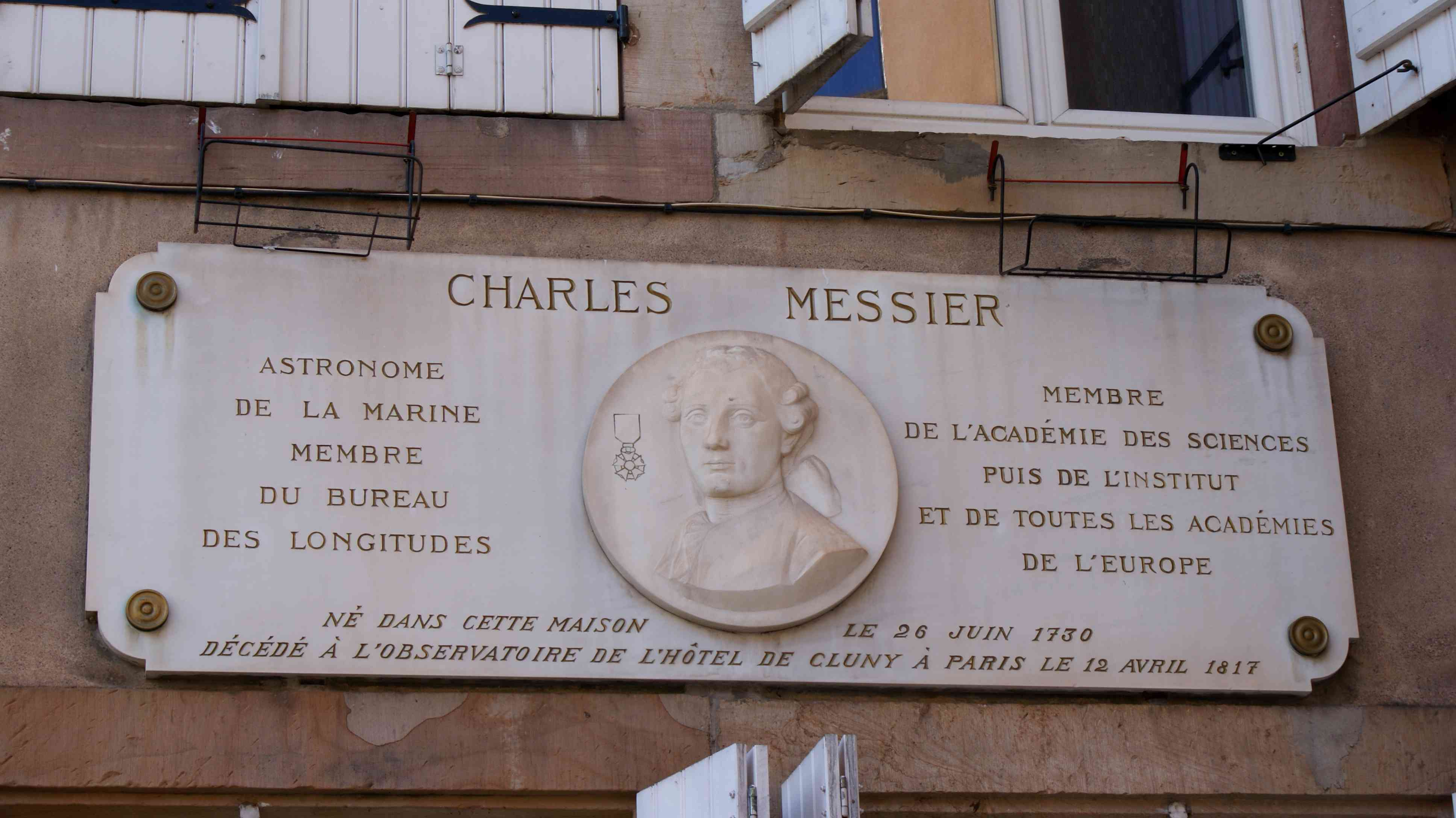
Commemorative plaque in Messier's hometown of Badonviller

The lunar crater Messier and the asteroid 7359 Messier were named in his honour.

=== Comets discovered ===
Messier discovered 13 comets:

- C/1760 B1 (Messier)
- C/1763 S1 (Messier)
- C/1764 A1 (Messier)
- C/1766 E1 (Messier)
- C/1769 P1 (Messier)
- D/1770 L1 (Lexell)
- C/1771 G1 (Messier)
- C/1773 T1 (Messier)
- C/1780 U2 (Messier)
- C/1785 A1 (Messier–Méchain)
- C/1788 W1 (Messier)
- C/1793 S2 (Messier)
- C/1798 G1 (Messier)

He also co-discovered comet C/1801 N1 (Pons), a discovery shared with several other observers including Pons, Méchain, and Bouvard.

== See also ==
- Deep-sky object
- List of Messier objects
- Messier object
- Messier marathon
- Caldwell catalogue
- New General Catalogue
