= John H. C. Coffin =

American astronomer and educator (1815–1890)

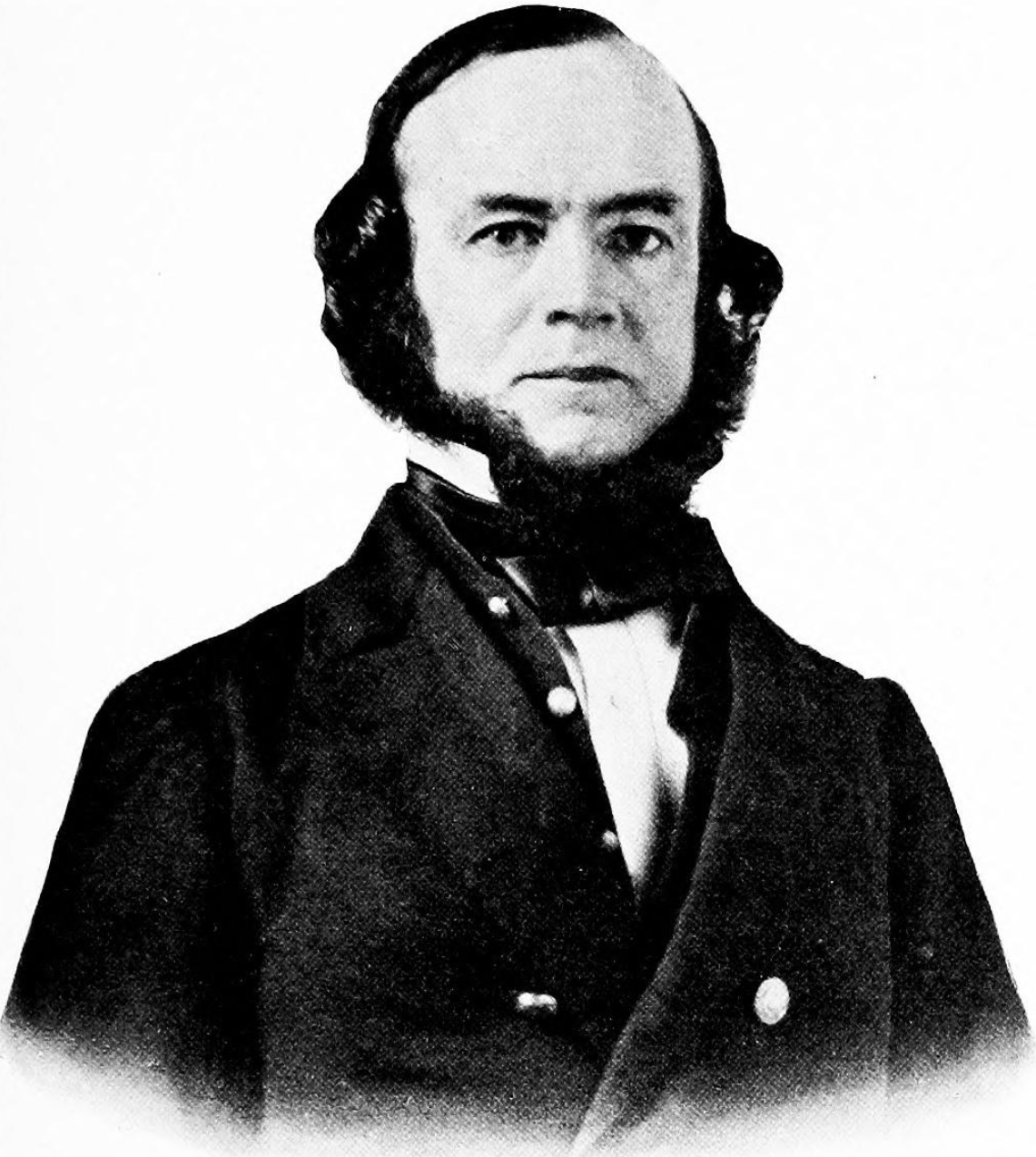
- Coffin in 1900 publication
- Born: John Huntington Crane Coffin; September 14, 1815; Wiscasset, Maine, U.S.
- Died: January 8, 1890 (aged 74); Washington, D.C., U.S.
- Resting place: Oak Hill Cemetery; Washington, D.C., U.S.
- Education: Bowdoin College (AB, AM)
- Occupations: Astronomer; educator; sailor; writer
- Spouse: Louisa Harrison (m. 1845; died 1871)
- Children: 5
- Relatives: Rufus King (great uncle)

John Huntington Crane Coffin (September 14, 1815 – January 8, 1890) was an American astronomer and educator. He was a professor of mathematics with the United States Navy and the United States Naval Academy. During the American Civil War, Coffin was the head of instruction at the Naval Academy. He served as the superintendent of American Ephemeris and Nautical Almanac from 1866 to 1877.

== Early life ==
John Huntington Crane Coffin was born on September 14, 1815, in Wiscasset, Maine, to Mary (née Porter) and Nathanael Coffin. His mother was the niece of Rufus King, U.S. minister to Great Britain. He graduated Bowdoin College in 1834 with a Bachelor of Arts. In 1834, Coffin went on a sea voyage with his uncle Captain King Porter and learned navigation and seamanship. He graduated with a Master of Arts from Bowdoin College in 1837. His sister married William Smyth, professor at Bowdoin College.

== Career ==
In 1836, Coffin became a professor of mathematics with the United States Navy. He taught midshipmen at sea and on land at the Norfolk Navy Yard. During this time, Coffin also served on the USS Vandalia, the USS Constellation and on surveys in Florida. Coffin was retained as a senior professor in 1848 when the corps was reduced.

Coffin was stationed at the United States Naval Observatory in Washington, D.C., starting in January 1845. He was in charge of the mural circle and remained there until 1853, after suffering an eye disease.

In 1853, Coffin became the head of the mathematics department at the United States Naval Academy. In 1860, Coffin also became head of the navigation and astronomy department, replacing the retiring William Chauvenet. Following the outbreak of the Civil War, the Naval Academy moved to Newport, Rhode Island, and Coffin was the head of all departments during that period. His textbook "Navigation and Nautical Almanac" was used for over thirty years in instruction at the Naval Academy.

Coffin served as the superintendent of the American Ephemeris and Nautical Almanac starting on May 1, 1866. In 1867, he moved from Cambridge, Massachusetts, to Washington, D.C., when the almanac moved its place of publication. He retired on September 15, 1877.

Coffin was elected as a member of the American Academy of Arts and Sciences in 1851. He became an associate fellow. He was also a member of the American Philosophical Society. In 1863, Coffin was appointed as one of the first members of the National Academy of Sciences by the U.S. Congress.

== Personal life ==
Coffin married Louisa Harrison of Maryland in the spring of 1845. They had two sons and three daughters, including Helen Olcott Paine, Richard Harrison and Louisa Harrison. His wife died in 1871.

Coffin died on January 8, 1890, in Washington, D.C. He was buried at Oak Hill Cemetery in Washington, D.C.

== Selected publications ==
- "Observations with the Mural Circle at the United States Naval Observatory, with Explanations, Formulas, Tables, and Discussions, 1845-1849"
- "Personal Errors in Observations of the Declination of Stars", Astronomical Journal (1850)
- "The Compass" (1863)
- "Navigation and Nautical Almanac" (edited, 1868–1879)
- "Observations of the Total Eclipse of the Sun, August, 1869"

== Legacy ==
In 1884, Coffin was awarded an honorary Doctor of Laws degree from Bowdoin College.
