= Moët (disambiguation) =

Moët & Chandon is a French fine winery and co-owner of the luxury goods company LVMH Moët Hennessy Louis Vuitton SE.

Moët, moet, MOET, or variation, may also refer to:

== People ==
- Moet Abebe (born 1989), Nigerian entertainer
- Claude Moët (1683–1760), French vintner
- Jean-Rémy Moët (1758–1841), French vintner and merchant seaman
- Michèle Moet-Agniel (born 1926), teacher and member of the French Resistance

== Other uses ==
- Ministry of Economy and Trade (Lebanon) (MOET)

== See also ==
- Moet Hennessy Louis Vuitton (LVMH)
- Moest (disambiguation)
