= Most =

Most or Möst may refer to:

== Places ==
- Most, Kardzhali Province, a village in Bulgaria
- Most (city), a city in the Czech Republic
  - Most District, a district surrounding the city
  - Most Basin, a lowland named after the city
  - Autodrom Most, motorsport race track near Most
- Möst, Khovd, a district in Khovd, Mongolia
- Most, Mokronog-Trebelno, a settlement in Slovenia
- Most, Istria County, a settlement in Croatia
- Most na Soči, a settlement in Slovenia

== Other uses ==
- Most (surname), including a list of people with the surname
- Franz Welser-Möst (born 1960), Austrian conductor
- Most (1969 film), a film about WWII Yugoslavian partisans
- Most (2003 film), a Czech film
- Most!, 2018 Czech TV series
- Most (grape) or Chasselas
- most (Unix), a terminal pager on Unix and Unix-like systems
- Most (wine) a cider made from apples or pears
- most, an English degree determiner
- Monolithic System Technology (MoST), a defunct American fabless semiconductor company
- Most (Croatian political party), a party founded in 2012
- Most Radio 105.8 FM, an Indonesian radio station

== See also ==
- MOST (disambiguation)
- The Most (disambiguation)
- Must (disambiguation)
- Moest (disambiguation)
