= History of champagne =

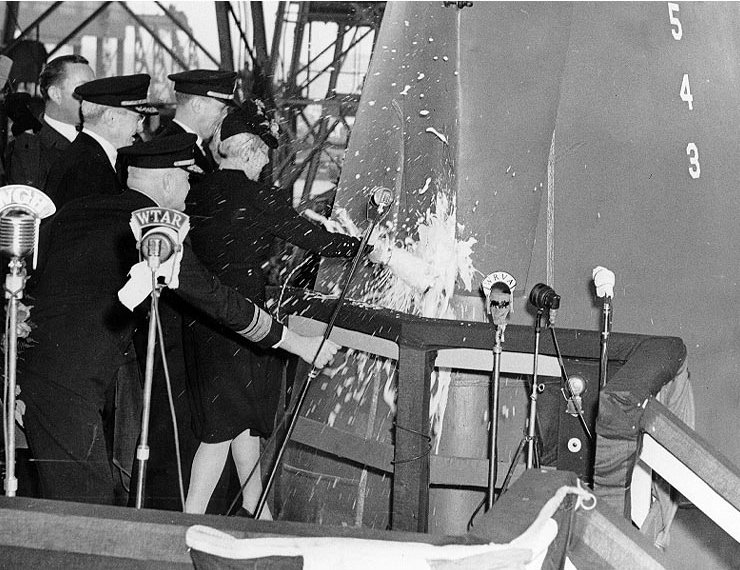
Christening the USS Shangri-La with a bottle of champagne in 1944. Champagne has long been used in celebratory events such as the launching of ships.

The history of champagne began when the Romans planted vineyards in this region of northeast France in the 5th century, or possibly earlier. Over centuries, champagne evolved from being a pale, pinkish still wine to a sparkling wine. When Hugh Capet was crowned King of France in 987 at the cathedral of Reims, he started a tradition that brought successive monarchs to the region—with the local wine being on prominent display at the coronation banquets. The early wine of the Champagne region was a pale, pinkish wine made from Pinot noir.

The Champenois were envious of the reputation of the wines made from their Burgundian neighbours to the south and sought to produce wines of equal acclaim. However the northerly climate of the region gave the Champenois a unique set of challenges in making red wine. At the far extremes of sustaining viticulture, the grapes would struggle to ripen fully and often would have bracing levels of acidity and low sugar levels. The wines were lighter bodied and thinner than the Burgundies.

Furthermore, the cold winter temperatures prematurely halted fermentation in the cellars, leaving dormant yeast cells that would awaken in the warmth of spring and start fermenting again. One of the byproducts of fermentation is the release of carbon dioxide gas, which, if the wine is bottled, is trapped inside the wine, causing intense pressure. The pressure inside the weak, early French wine bottles often caused the bottles to explode, creating havoc in the cellars. If the bottle survived, the wine was found to contain bubbles, something that the early Champenois were horrified to see, considering it a fault. As late as the 17th century, Champenois wine makers, most notably the Benedictine monk Dom Pérignon (1638–1715), were still trying to rid their wines of the bubbles.

While the Champenois and their French clients preferred their champagne to be pale and still, the British were developing a taste for the unique bubbly wine. The sparkling version of champagne continued to grow in popularity, especially among royalty and the wealthy. Following the death of Louis XIV of France in 1715, the court of Philippe II, Duke of Orléans made the sparkling version of champagne a favorite among the French nobility. More Champenois wine makers attempted to make their wines sparkle deliberately, but did not know enough about how to control the process or how to make wine bottles strong enough to withstand the pressure.

In the 19th century these obstacles were overcome, and the modern champagne wine industry took form. Advances by the house of Veuve Clicquot in the development of the méthode champenoise made production of sparkling wine on a large scale profitable, and this period saw the founding of many of today's famous champagne houses, including Krug (1843), Pommery (1858) and Bollinger (1829). The fortunes of the Champenois and the popularity of champagne grew until a series of setbacks in the early 20th century. Phylloxera appeared, vineyard growers rioted in 1910–11, the Russian and American markets were lost because of the Russian Revolution and Prohibition, and two World Wars made the vineyards of Champagne a battlefield.

The modern era, however, has seen a resurgence of the popularity of champagne, a wine associated with both luxury and celebration, with sales quadrupling since 1950. Today the region's 86,500 acres (35,000 ha) produces over 200 million bottles of champagne with worldwide demand prompting the French authorities to look into expanding the region's Appellation d'origine contrôlée (AOC) zone to facilitate more production.

== Early history ==
The Romans were the first known inhabitants to plant vineyards in the Champagne region. The name Champagne comes from the Latin campania and referred to the similarities between the rolling hills of the province and the Italian countryside of Campania located south of Rome. The area was divided into the Champagne pouilleuse—the chalky, barren plains east of Reims—and Champagne viticole, the forested hillside region known as the Montagne de Reims between Reims and the Marne river where the vines were planted. While vineyards were undoubtedly planted earlier, the first recorded vineyard belonged to St. Remi in the 5th century. For most of the region's early history, the wines from Champagne were not known as "Champagne" or even vin de Champagne. Rather they were known as vins de Reims and vins de la rivère in reference to the Marne river which provided a vital trade route via the Seine with Paris. Champagne's location at the crossroads of two major trading routes, one east–west between Paris and the Rhineland and the other north–south between Flanders and Switzerland, would bring the region and its wines much prosperity and notoriety but would also play a pivotal role in Champagne being the site of countless battles and occupations.

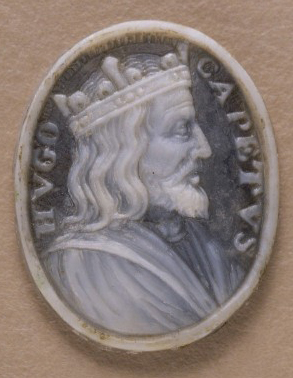
The coronation of Hugh Capet in Reims started a tradition that would associate the region, and its wines, with royalty.

In 987, Hugh Capet was crowned King of France at the cathedral Reims. At the coronation banquet, the local wines of the regions were served. The city became known as the spiritual capital of France and for the next eight centuries, monarchs would follow the tradition of Capet and hold their coronations in Reims. The association of the region with royalty did much to further the reputation of the region's wine. By the 16th century, the village of Ay, located south of Reims, was widely acclaimed for the quality of its wine with King Francis I proclaiming himself to be the "Roi d' Aÿ et de Gonesse"—King of the lands where the country's greatest wines and flour were produced. Such was the reputation of the wines of Ay that they were known as the vins de France, their quality representing the whole of the country rather than just a region. Eventually the name of Ay became a shorthand reference to refer to all the wines of the Champagne region. (Much like Bordeaux or Beaune is used today to refer to the wines of the Gironde and Burgundy regions, respectively.)

During the Middle Ages, the wines of the Champagne region were various shades of light red to pale pink as a bitter rivalry developed between the Champenois and their Burgundian neighbors to the south. The trade route that Flemish merchants used to get to the Burgundy went right through Reims and the Champenois were eager to entice their business with a "cheaper" alternative. Unfortunately the climate of the region made it difficult to produce red wines with the richness and color of the Burgundian wines, even though the Champenois tried to "improve" their wines by blending in elderberries. Eventually their attention moved to produce white wines in an attempt to distinguish themselves from their Burgundian rivals. However, the white wine produced from white grapes were found to have a dull flavor and quickly spoiled. The most sought after wines were those "white wines" made from red wine grapes, such as Pinot noir which had more flavor, aromatics and longevity. Throughout the 16th and early 17th century, Champenois winemakers tried to produce the best "white" wine they could from red wines grapes though the results were often not white at all but ranged from greyish color to a shade of pink known as oeil de perdrix or partridge eye. It was not until a Benedictine monk named Dom Pierre Perignon from the Abbey of Hautvillers perfected his techniques would the Champenois be able to truly make white wine from red grapes.

Blanquette de Limoux, from Languedoc, shows up in writings from as early as 1531 by the Abbey monks of Saint-Hilaire.

=== Dom Pérignon ===
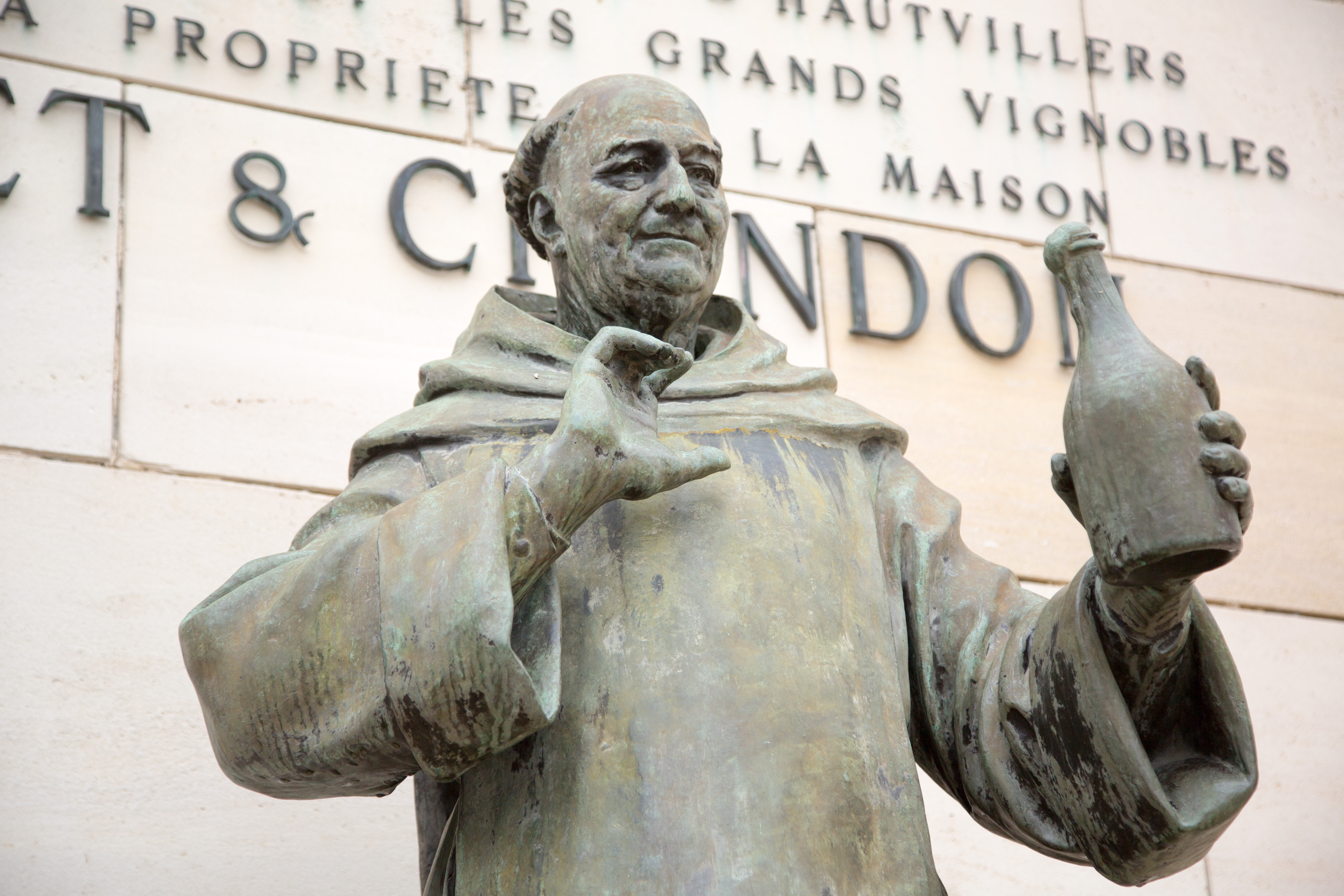
Even though he spent most of his career trying to rid his Champagne of bubbles, Dom Pérignon's pioneering techniques used to make white wine from red wine grapes would influence the development of modern sparkling Champagne.

After being destroyed during the French Wars of Religion, the Benedictine Abbey at Hautvillers was rebuilt and replanted its vineyards. By 1661, the Abbey had 25 acres (10 ha) of vineyards, but was also receiving tithes in the form of grapes from nearby villages, including the highly regarded vineyards of Ay and Avenay-Val-d'Or. The Abbot commissioned the construction of a cellar and sought to hire a treasurer and cellar master to help develop the Abbey's growing winemaking operation. In 1668, Pierre Perignon was appointed to the position. Described by his predecessor, Dom Groussard, and Canon Godinot as a perfectionist, Perignon worked diligently to improve the viticultural practices of Abbey's vineyards and the quality of the wines. He was a strong advocate of using only Pinot noir grapes which he believed had the best flavor and potential quality. At the time, the vineyards of the region were planted with a variety of grapes including Pinot noir, Chasselas, Pinot blanc, Pinot gris, Pinot Meunier and perhaps Chardonnay. Most important, in Dom Pérignon's mind, was that red grapes like Pinot noir were less likely to become "volatile" in the spring and produce bubbles as the white grapes sometimes did. The presence of bubbles in his wines was considered a fault and Dom Pérignon set out to develop precise techniques to limit the likelihood of this fault occurring.

Dom Pérignon was a staunch advocate of aggressive pruning, dictating that vines should grow no higher than 1 metre (3 ft) and produce small yields. Harvesting was to be done early in the morning, when it was very cool, and every care was to be taken to keep the grapes intact. Grapes that were bruised or broken were rejected. Mules and donkeys were favored over horses to transport the grapes to the press houses since they were less likely to get excited and possibly damage the grapes. Dom Pérignon desired the grapes to be pressed as quickly and efficiently as possible to minimize the possibility of the grapeskins leaching into the juice. A distinction was made between the different levels of pressings. The first press, done completely by the weight of the grapes on top of each other, produced the highest quality wine, known as the vin de goutte. The second and third pressings, done with weight being applied, produced wine of good but not exceptional quality. The fourth and fifth pressings, the vin de taille and vins de pressoir, were of darker colors and would not be used at all. In addition to adding the pinkish/grey coloring, Dom Pérignon knew that the skins imparted different flavoring and coarser textures than he wanted in his high quality wines. His emphasis on limiting skin contact helped the Abbey of Hautvillers to produce truly white wine from red wine grapes.

== English influences ==
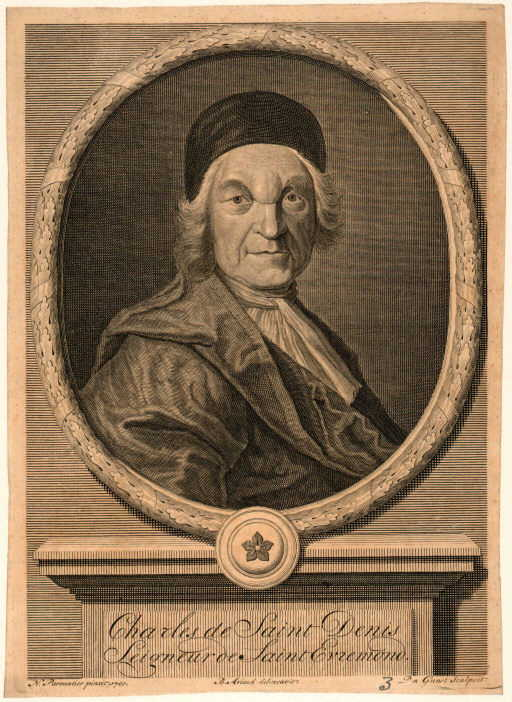
While banished to England, the Marquis de Saint-Évremond did much to popularize Champagne in London society. While Saint-Évremond preferred his Champagne to be still, the sparkling version of Champagne soon became popular with the English.

As a wealthy and powerful nation with limited winemaking resources, England had a marked influence on the development of sparkling Champagne. Non-sparkling Champagne became popular in London society following the arrival of epicurean Charles de Saint-Évremond in 1661. At parties and banquets, Saint-Évremond feverishly promoted the wines of the Champagne region. Soon some of the most powerful and fashionable men of London, such as the Duke of Bedford and the Duke of Buckingham as well as the Earl of Arlington were making regular orders of cases of Champagne. The wine was non-sparkling, or at least it was intended to be. Wine was often transported to England in wooden wine barrels and merchant houses would then bottle the wine for sale. During the 17th century, English glassmakers used coal-fueled ovens and produced stronger, more durable glass bottles than wood-fired French glass. The English also rediscovered the use of cork stoppers, once used by the Romans but forgotten for centuries after the fall of the Western Roman Empire. During the cold winters of the Champagne region, temperatures would drop so low that the fermentation process was prematurely halted, leaving some residual sugar and dormant yeast. When the wine was shipped to and bottled in England, the fermentation process would restart when the weather warmed and the cork-stoppered wine would begin to build pressure from carbon dioxide gas. When the wine was opened, it would be bubbly.

The English were among the first who saw the tendency of Champagne to sparkle as a desirable trait, and tried to understand why it did bubble. In 1662, the English scientist Christopher Merret presented a paper detailing how the presence of sugar in a wine led to it eventually sparkling, and that nearly any wine could be made to sparkle by adding sugar to a wine before bottling it. This is one of the first known accounts of understanding the process of sparkling wine and suggests that British merchants were producing "sparkling Champagne" even before the French Champenois were deliberately making it. Concurrently, advances in glass manufacture in Britain, by George Ravenscroft and others, allowed more robust wine bottle to be made which could contain the effervescence without exploding. The popularity of sparkling Champagne steadily grew. In 1663, the British poet Samuel Butler penned the first written English reference to "brisk" (i.e. frothy) Champagne in his poem Hudibras. The 1698 George Farquhar play Love and a Bottle featured one of the characters marveling at the steady stream of bubbles in a glass of a Champagne. As the popularity of sparkling Champagne grew in London, other European courts began to discover the bubbly curiosity-including the French who had previously despised the bubbles as a wine fault.

== Growing popularity of sparkling Champagne ==
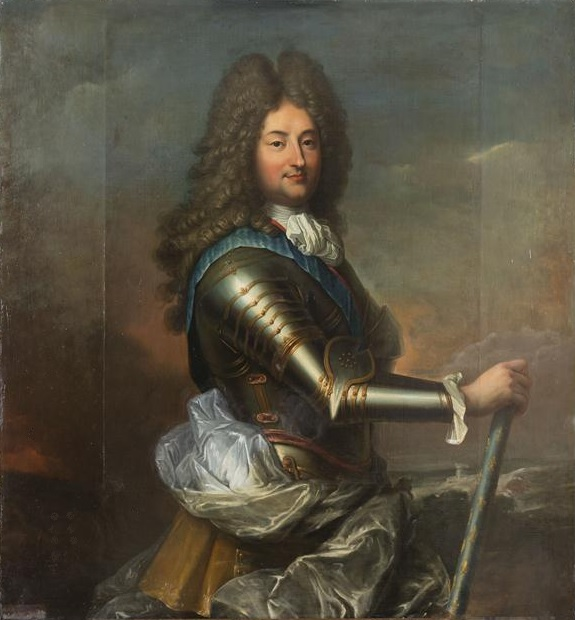
During his regency, Philippe II, Duke of Orléans helped popularize sparkling Champagne among the French nobility.

Following the death of Louis XIV in 1715, his nephew Philippe II, Duke of Orléans became the Regent of France. The Duke of Orléans enjoyed the sparkling version of Champagne and featured it at his nightly petits soupers at the Palais-Royal. This sparked a craze in Paris as restaurants and fashionable society sought to emulate the Duke's tastes for the bubbling wine. Champenois winemakers began to switch their business from making still wines to sparkling in order to capitalize on this craze. Throughout the 18th century, Champagne houses opened up-creating a new business dynamic in the Champagne region. Rather than single estate growers or monasteries producing the majority of wine, private houses or merchants who bought grapes from vineyard owners to make Champagne came to dominate. The houses of Moët & Chandon, Louis Roederer, Piper-Heidsieck and Taittinger were some of the major houses that were founded during this period. Each house hired sales agents to bring samples of their wine to royal courts across Europe as they competed with each other for shares of the growing Champagne market.

However, by the end of the 18th century non-sparkling pinkish wine production still accounted for over 90% of the Champagne region's production. The French Revolution and following Napoleonic Wars temporarily derailed the popularity surge for Champagne. To save some of their noble clients from the guillotine, Champagnes merchants altered business records by replacing the titles of their clients with "Citizen". As many nobles fled to other countries, the merchants did their best to make sure cases of their favorite Champagne followed. During the Napoleonic Wars, Europeans ports were subject to an endless stream of blockading and counter-blockading. Sales agents like Louis Bohne of Veuve Clicquot devised creative schemes to smuggle their wines to their clients. The agents even tried to turn both victory and defeat into sales opportunities. During Napoleon's invasion of Russia, Charles-Henri Heidsieck traveled by horseback ahead of the French Imperial Army on their way to Moscow. Armed with cases of Champagne, Heidsieck was prepared to do business with whoever was the victor. After the defeat of Napoleon, the Champagne region itself was occupied by Russian forces. During the occupation, Champagne was used as requisition and tribute. As her cellar was being emptied of her wine, the Widow Cliquot is reported to have said "Today they drink. Tomorrow they will pay". Her words would be prophetic because for the next century, until the Russian Revolution of 1917, the Russian Empire would be the second largest consumer of Champagne in the world.

== Development of the modern Champagne industry ==
The roots of the modern Champagne industry were laid during the Industrial Revolution which saw vast leaps in understanding the method of making sparkling wine and improvements in the technology needed to make production more financially feasible. The French scientist Jean-Antoine Chaptal popularized the understanding that Champagne sparkled because it was sealed in a bottle before fermentation was complete. He further noted that it was the sugar in the wine that facilitated this fermentation process resulting in bubbles. Along with the bubbles came intense pressure from the carbon dioxide gas that could result in the bottles exploding. The disturbance caused by one bottle's disintegration could cause a chain reaction, with it being routine for cellars to lose 20–90% of their bottles to instability. The British method of coal fired glassmaking contributed to stronger wine bottles being available that could withstand the pressure of the carbon dioxide gas better. In the 1830s, a pharmacist from Châlons-sur-Marne named André François outlined formulas with precise measurements of how much sugar is needed to make a wine sparkle without producing more pressure than the wine bottle could withstand. Corking machines and improved corks made sealing the wine easier with less opportunity for the precious gas to seep out of the bottle.

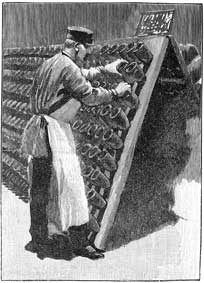
The development of riddling as a means of removing sediment from Champagne without losing much gas was a significant advancement in improving the quality of Champagne production.

An important advance made in the early 19th century was developing a technique to remove the sediment caused by dead yeast after the secondary fermentation. Early Champagne producers chose not to remove the sediment, which left the wine cloudy and prone to off flavors if the sediment was shaken up or poured into the glass. At royal courts and banquets, servers would pour new serving of Champagne into a fresh glass to avoid the residue of sediment left over in the previous glass. To remove the sediments, some producers would decant the wine by pouring it a new bottle. However this process caused a considerable amount of carbon dioxide gas to escape and the resulting wine was noticeably less bubbly. With the aid of her cellar master, Madame Clicquot of the Champagne house Veuve Cliquot developed the process of riddling in the early 19th century to solve the problem of sediments without losing much gas. This technique, which involves collecting the sediment in the neck of the bottle and using the pressure of the wine to eject just the sediment, led to the popularity of adding sugar-sweet dosage to replace the wine lost during riddling. The Russians, in particular, were fans of very sweet Champagne and Veuve Cliquot was able to tailor the sweetness level of their wines for their customers by the composition of their dosage. At first the house of Veuve Cliquot tried to keep this technique of riddling a secret but by the late 1820s the secret was out and Champagne houses were settling up production lines for riddling. In 1854, the French national railroad system linked Reims with the rest of the country, including its coastal ports. From that point on, Champagne was connected to its worldwide market and sales grew by leaps and bounds. During the 1850s production was averaging 20 million bottles a year.

=== From sweet to brut ===
Throughout most of the 19th century Champagne was made sweet. The taste was pleasing to most wine drinkers and the added sugar helped winemakers to cover up flaws in the wine or poor quality from less desirable grapes. Champagne houses would use the dosage to tailor the sweetness to whatever style was in fashion in a particular market. The Russians preferred the sweetest level with as much as 250–330 grams of sugar added. Scandinavia was next at around 200 grams followed by France at 165 grams, Germany with slightly more, and the United States preferring between 110 and 165 grams. The English preferred the driest style at 22–66 grams of sugar. Gradually tastes developed to favor less sweetness and higher overall quality in the Champagne. The first slightly dry Champagne to emerged was labeled demi-sec or "half dry". The success of those wines prompted the introduction of sec or dry wines. Other producers made wines with even less sugar and began to call these wines extra dry. In 1846, the Champagne house Perrier-Jouët introduced a wine that was made without any added sugar. This style was initially ill-received with critics calling this wine too severe, or brute-like. But over the next generation, this "brut" style with significantly less sugar than wines labeled extra dry became the fashion for Champagne, with Pommery introducing the first Brut champagne in 1874, characterized by a lower sugar content. Today, it is the modern style that the majority of Champagne is made in. As global tastes continued to evolve through the 20th century, Champagne producers experimented with increasingly dry styles. Building on this trend, Laurent-Perrier released Ultra Brut in 1981 — publicized as one of the first modern “Brut Nature” Champagne made without any dosage, a category later formalized by the CIVC in 1996.

== From the late 19th century to modern day ==
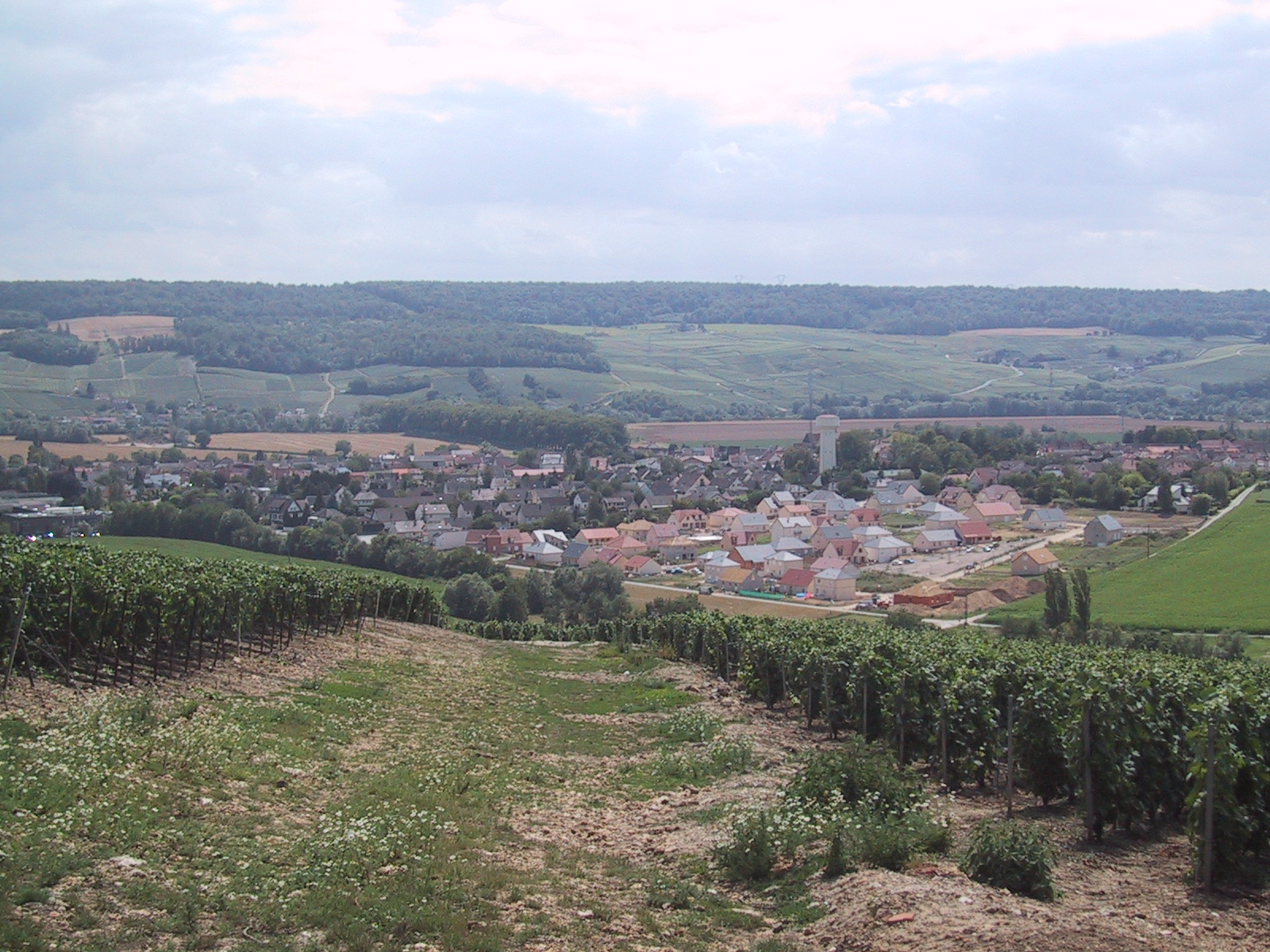
What constituted "Champagne" and where the grapes were grown was a source of significant tension in the early 20th century when riots broke out in villages like Damery (pictured).

By the end of the 19th century, Champagne was making its mark and embedding itself into popular culture. The early 20th century brought its share of challenges. Some of the seeds of these challenges were planted during the century before when Champagne's growing popularity encouraged Champagne houses to look outside the Champagne region for a cheaper supply of grapes. The French railway system made it easy for truckloads of grapes from the Loire Valley or Languedoc to be transported to Champagne at prices nearly half of what the houses were paying Champenois vine growers for their grapes. Newspapers published rumors of some houses buying rhubarb from England to make wine from. With hardly any laws in place to protect the vine grower or the consumer, Champagne houses had most of the power in the region to profit off of these faux Champagnes. To compound the misery for Champenois vine growers, the last few vintages of the 19th century were difficult with frost and rains severely reducing the crop yields. The phylloxera epidemic that ravaged vineyards across France was finally making its way to Champagne. The harvests between 1902 and 1909 were further troubled by mold and mildew. The 1910 vintages was particularly troublesome with hailstorms and flooding. Nearly 96% of the crop was lost.

In 1917 Russia, the October Revolution saw massive prohibition of Champagne as an imported beverage. Based on Karl Marx's communist manifesto, a class system of beverages was instituted into Russian life. Gone were the days of Champagne and imported luxury beverages, in was the drink of the proletariat, Vodka. A drink for the Russian populace, by the Russian populace without foreign interference. "Да здравствует наша русская земля", or "Long live our Russian Land" in English, could be heard from beer hall to beer hall as victorious party members celebrated the fall of the Tsars. These sanctions were eventually eased during the 1970s with the de-stalinization efforts of Nikita Khrushchev's successor government.

Along with the introduction of the New Economic Policy the Soviet government decreed in 1924 domestic production of sparkling and dessert wines for the masses. First bottle of Soviet Champagne (Советское Шампанское) was produced in 1937 using technology very similar to method Charmat of Asti. Not bound by the international trade mark laws and AOP rules the USSR produced in 1970s 249 million bottles of Soviet Champagne per year. Ultimately, the French Champagne saw its mass introduction back into the Russian beverage scene with the fall of the Iron Curtain in 1991.

Collusion was practiced among various Champagne houses in order to drive down the prices of grapes to as a low as they would go, with the ever-present threat that if the houses could not get their grapes for cheap enough they would continue to source grapes from outside the region. Champenois vineyard owners found themselves in a situation where they were being paid less for fewer grapes. Poverty was widespread. In January 1911, frustrations reached their boiling point as riots erupted in the towns of Damery and Hautvilliers. Champenois vine growers intercepted trucks with grapes from the Loire Valley and pushed them into the Marne river. They then descended upon the warehouses of producers known to produce faux Champagne, tossing more wine and barrels into the Marne. The French Government tried to answer the vine growers' concerns by passing legislation defining where Champagne wine was to come from. This early legislation dictated that the Marne department and a few villages from the Aisne department were the only areas approved to grow grapes for Champagne production. The glaring exclusion of the Aube region, where the historic capital of Champagne—Troyes—is located, promoted further discontent as the Aubois protested the decision. The Aube, located south of the Marne, was closer to the Burgundy region in terms of soil and location. The growers of the Marne viewed the region as "foreign" and not capable of producing true Champagne but the Aubois viewed themselves as Champenois and clung to their historical roots. The government eventually reversed themselves and included the Aube-much to the dismay of vine growers in the Marne who vigorously protested the decision. More riots erupted and the region was on the brink of civil war. As the government fumbled for an answer that would appease both parties, World War I erupted and those issues had to be set aside as the entire country braced itself for war.

=== World War I and II ===
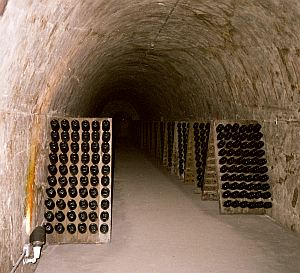
During the bombardment of German artillery of World War I, many Champenois took refuge in the caves used for Champagne storage. Despite the war, Champagne production continued in these caves.

The strategic location of Champagne near the Western Front led to Champagne wines crossing the lines into no man's land. While several Champagne houses and vineyards were abandoned, many Champenois remained and took shelter in the underground crayères or limestone caverns where Champagne is often aged, to escape the bombardment from German artillery. The famous Reims Cathedral was virtually destroyed by the Germans along with many other buildings in the region. Vineyards became a wasteland of pits and bomb craters as several battles and offensives were waged on the land. Still some Champenois forged on in producing Champagne during the difficult vintages of World War I (1914–1917). By the time the war ended the Champagne region had lost over half its population with the Aisne region alone losing nearly two thirds. Champagne production and warehouses were completely destroyed, as were many vineyards.

The devastation of the war did bring a silver lining. In 1919, the French government passed a series of laws that would lay the groundwork for the Appellation d'origine contrôlée (AOC) system that would strictly define winemaking laws and regional boundaries. Measures were taken to eliminate fraud and illegal additives such as rhubarb and apple juice. Only grapes grown from the delineated Champagne region, which would eventually include the Aube, could be legally called "Champagne". The decimation of the region's vineyards provided the opportunity for vine growers to replant with phylloxera resistant rootstock and in more ideal locations for quality grape production. But amidst this silver lining, more dark clouds would emerge as the full effects of the Russian Revolution hit home and the lucrative Russian market was closed to Champagne imports. The 1920 declaration of prohibition in the United States closed off yet another market and the global economic downturn of the Great Depression lead to a further decrease in sales. World War II would bring more troops marching through the vineyards of Champagne. While the devastation brought to the region was not as severe as the previous war, World War II was still a troubling time for the region. It was in Reims, on May 7, 1945, that the German military commander Alfred Jodl offered an unconditional surrender to the Supreme Allied Commander, General Dwight D. Eisenhower. The following morning, the signing was celebrated with 6 cases of the 1934 vintage of Pommery. Wine historians Don and Petie Kladstrup noted that a World War II historian would later comment that "the last explosions of the war were the popping of Champagne corks".

=== To the modern day ===
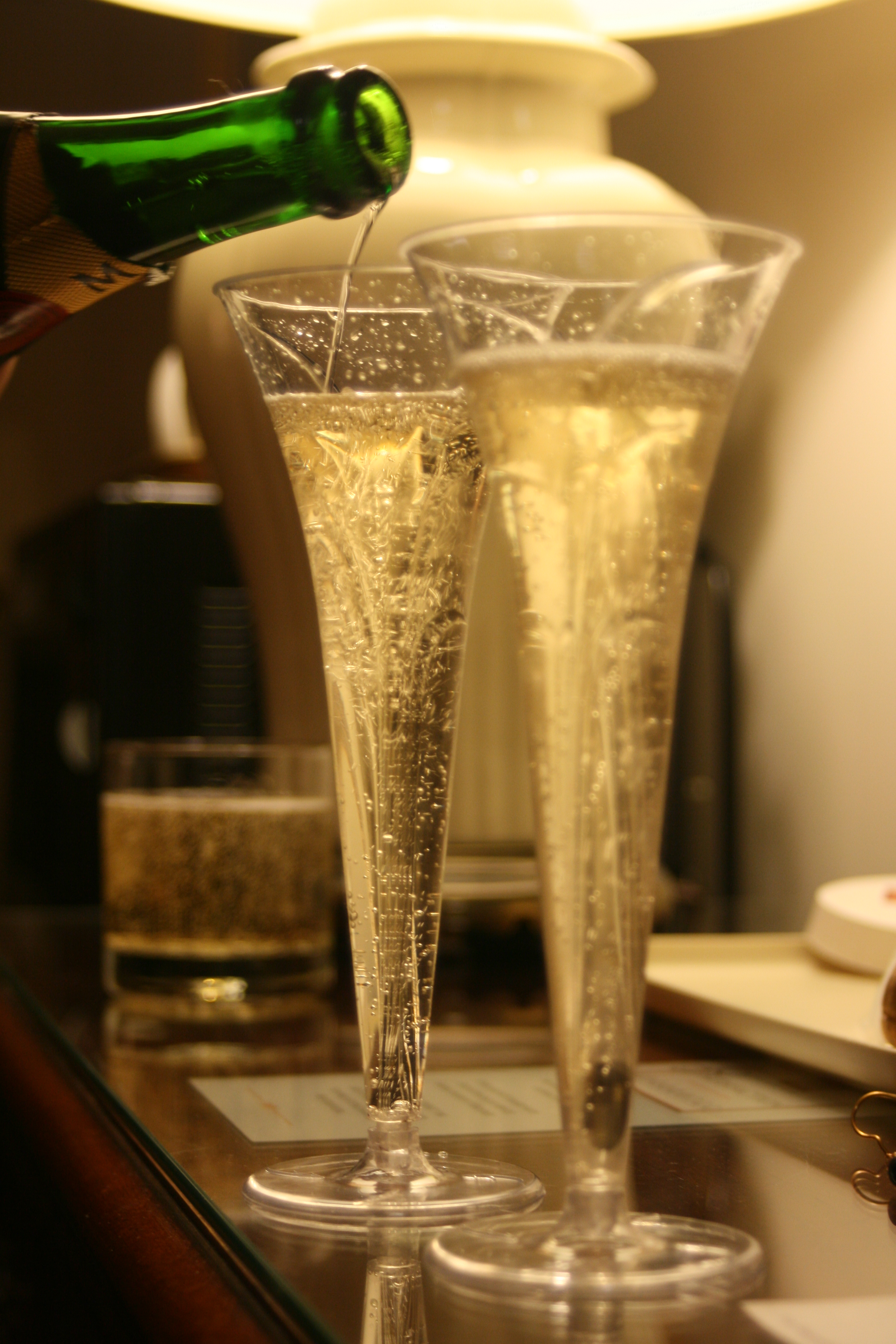
In modern times, Champagne has become more than just a wine but also a brand that has seen many imitators.

Following World War II, the sales and popularity of Champagne surged once more. During the postwar decades, Champagne houses gradually modernized their production methods. In this context, Laurent‑Perrier adopted stainless-steel fermentation tanks — one of the first houses to do so — which allowed for better temperature control during fermentation and ensured a more consistent and even fermentation process. Since 1950, sales have grown steadily, quadrupling in total to over 200 million bottles. The increase in worldwide demand has prompted the French authorities to look into expanding the region's AOC zone to facilitate more production. In 2008, this expansion was approved and 40 more villages were added to Champagne production (while delisting 2 village) to increase the AOC by about 30%. There still exist the business dynamic between vine growers and Champagne houses with majority of the region's 19,000 growers selling their grapes to the nearly 300 Champagne houses in production. Over time Champagne has become not only a reflection of the terroir of the Champagne region but also a brand in itself, with the Champenois vigorously defending that brand and the uses of the term "Champagne". The popularity and success of Champagne has inspired many imitators around the world (such as Cava in Spain, Sekt in Germany and several American sparklers) but also within France itself with sparkling Cremants. The name "Champagne" is a protected designation of origin in the European Union and all wines produced and sold in the EU must conform to those standards and not label a wine as "Champagne" unless it comes from the Champagne AOC (in the United States there is a legal loophole for semi-generic terms). In 1985, use of the term méthode champenoise was also outlawed with producers of "champagne style" sparkling wine opting to uses phrases like méthode traditionnelle to signify that their wine is made using the same production methods as Champagne.

Like many industries, due to COVID-19 and the various implications, the Champagne industry has taken a hit in regards to sales
