= Must (disambiguation) =

Must is the juice made out of freshly pressed grapes.

Must or MUST may also refer to:

- Must (surname)
- Musth or must, a periodic physiological and behavioural change affecting bull elephants
- Julmust, a Swedish soft drink made out of extracts of hop and malt
- Must, one of the English modal verbs
- Must (album), a 2021 album by South Korean boy band 2PM
- Medical Unit, Self-contained, Transportable, a type of hospital equipment used by the United States Army c. 1960–1990

== Organisations ==
- Macau University of Science and Technology, Macau, China
- Manchester United Supporters' Trust, the official supporters' trust of Manchester United F.C.
- Mazandaran University of Science and Technology, Babol, Mazandaran, Iran
- Mbarara University of Science and Technology, Mbarara, Uganda
- Mbeya University of Science and Technology, Tanzania
- Swedish Military Intelligence and Security Service (Militära underrättelse- och säkerhetstjänsten)
- Mindanao University of Science and Technology, Cagayan de Oro City, Philippines
- Minghsin University of Science and Technology, Hsinchu County, Taiwan
- Mirpur University of Science and Technology, Mirpur, Azad Kashmir, Pakistan
- Misr University for Science and Technology, Egypt
- Mongolian University of Science and Technology, Ulan Bator, Mongolia
- Missouri University of Science and Technology, United States
- Malaysia University of Science & Technology, Malaysia
- Malawi University of Science and Technology, Malawi

== See also ==
- Most (disambiguation)
- Mustard (disambiguation)
- Muster (disambiguation)
- NUST (disambiguation)
- University of Science and Technology (disambiguation)
