= Muster =

Muster may refer to:

== Military terminology ==
- Muster (military), a process or event for the accounting for members in a military unit
- Muster list, list of the functions for team members
- A mustering, in military terminology, is a specialised formation, similar to an administrative corps

== People ==
- Bill Muster (1926–1989), photographer, publisher, and marketing executive in Los Angeles
- Brad Muster (born 1965), former American football fullback
- Miki Muster (1925–2018), Slovenian cartoonist and animator
- Peter Muster (born 1952), Swiss sprinter
- Thomas Muster (born 1967), former World Number 1 tennis player

== Places ==
- Mustér, the Romansh name for the municipality of Disentis, Switzerland

== Other uses ==
- Muster drill, also known as a lifeboat drill
- Muster (livestock), the rounding-up of livestock
- Muster (grape), another name for the Italian wine grape Avarengo
- Muster (event), a competitive skills event held between fire departments
- Muster (census), an official population count, conducted by a government
- Muster (Texas A&M University), a tradition at Texas A&M University in the US.
- Ute muster, an auto show

== See also ==
- Must (disambiguation)
- Musters, a surname (with a list of people of this name)
