= MEST =

MEST or Mest may refer to:

== As an initialism ==
- Ministry of Education, Science and Technology (disambiguation)
- Middle European Summer Time, obsolete variant name of the Central European Summer Time, a time offset
- MEST (Scientology), acronym for "matter, energy, space and time", used to refer to the physical universe
- MEST (gene), a gene in humans that encodes the mesoderm-specific transcript homolog protein
- Meltwater Entrepreneurial School of Technology, a school in Accra, Ghana
- Cystic nephroma, a type of begin kidney tumor also known as a mixed epithelial stromal tumor

== Other ==
- Mest, a pop punk band from Blue Island, Illinois
  - Mest (album), their third studio album
- Revenge, the Russian word for which is Мест, rendered Mest in the Latin alphabet
  - The Red Flute, a Soviet drama film with the Russian title Mest
  - Soviet submarine M-200, a short-range attack submarine of the Soviet Navy
- Musti (Tunisia), a former Roman city in northern Tunisia, also known as Mest
- Vem vet mest? ("Who Knows Best?"), a Swedish game show

== See also ==
- Moest (disambiguation)
