= Most (surname) =

Most is a surname. Some notable people with the surname include:

- Deforrest Most (1917–2006), American gymnast
- Don Most (born 1953), American actor
- Doug Most (born 1968), editor of The Boston Globe Magazine
- Glenn W. Most (born 1952), American classicist and comparatist
- Jeff Most (born 1960), American film producer
- Johann Most (1846–1906), German-American anarchist and orator
- Johnny Most (1923–1993), American sports announcer
- Liza van der Most (born 1993), Dutch footballer
- Mickie Most (1938–2003), English record producer
- Sam Most (1930–2013), Los Angeles–based jazz flautist and tenor saxophonist

== See also ==
- Most (disambiguation)
