= Must (surname) =

Family name

Must is an Estonian surname meaning black. Notable people with the surname include:

- Aadu Must (1951–2023), Estonian historian and politician
- Ivar Must (born 1961), Estonian composer
- Kullo Must (1911–1987), Estonian film producer
- Mari Must (1920–2008), Estonian linguist
- Raul Must (born 1987), Estonian badminton player
