= Jean-Rémy Moët =

French vintner and merchant

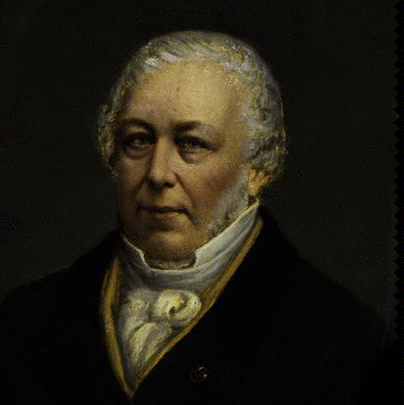
Jean-Rémy Moët

Jean-Rémy Moët (1758–1841) was a French vintner and merchant seaman who helped bring the Champagne house of Moët et Chandon to international prominence. He inherited the house from his grandfather and founder Claude Moët.

== Friendship with Napoleon ==
Jean-Rémy Moët first met Napoleon Bonaparte in 1782 at the military academy of Brienne-le-Château when Moët was soliciting orders for his family champagne firm. The two kept in touch and developed an enduring friendship that would last both their lifetimes. During his military campaigns, Napoleon would always make it an objective to visit the Moët estate at Épernay to pick up cases of champagne. The only exception was when Napoleon had to rush to confront Wellington at the Battle of Waterloo.

Napoleon's friendship and patronage greatly benefited the Moët house and as a tribute, Moët built a replica of Grand Trianon on his property, complete with original work by Jean-Baptiste Isabey, for Napoleon and Empress Josephine to stay in when they visit.

On 14 March 1814, just a few weeks before Paris was to fall during the War of the Sixth Coalition, Napoleon stayed at his friend's estate and awarded him the Légion d'honneur cross for his distinguished service to France in increasing its worldwide reputation for wine.

== After the fall of Napoleon ==
Following Napoleon's abdication, the region of Champagne was occupied by Russian soldiers of the Sixth Coalition. In retaliation for Napoleon's earlier conquest, the Champenois were subjected to large fines and ordered to pay requisitions. Most of Champagne's cellars were plundered. Moët's was particularly hard hit, with more than 600,000 bottles emptied by the Russian encampment. Instead of resisting, Moët told his friends "All of those soldiers who are ruining me today will make my fortune tomorrow. I'm letting them drink all they want. They will be hooked for life and become my best salesmen when they go back to their own country."

Moët's words were prophetic as in the ensuing years, the House of Moët saw a boom in sales and prestige with clients from around the world visiting their cellars and making purchases including the former Napoleonic foes Arthur Wellesley, 1st Duke of Wellington, Frederick William III of Prussia, William II of the Netherlands, Francis II, Holy Roman Emperor and Czar Alexander I of Russia.

== See also ==
- List of wine personalities
