= MOST =

MOST may refer to:

== Organizations ==
- MOST (Croatia), a political party in Croatia founded in 2012
- Milton J. Rubenstein Museum of Science and Technology, a museum in Syracuse, New York, US
- Ministry of Science and Technology, a ministry or other government agency
- MOST (Association, Serbia) a Non-governmental Citizen's association from Serbia
- Music & Opera Singers Trust, an opera and classic music organisation in Australia that created the Opera Awards

== Science and technology ==
- Maynard Operation Sequence Technique, a work measurement system
- Media Oriented Systems Transport, an electronic bus type architecture for on-board audio-visual devices, primarily in automobiles
- Microvariability and Oscillations of STars telescope, a stellar photometric monitoring satellite built by Canada
- Molonglo Observatory Synthesis Telescope, a radio telescope in Australia
- MOST (ATM Network) a defunct network of bank Automatic Teller Machines on the East Coast of the United States
- Molecular Solar Thermal System, a form of thermal energy storage

== See also ==
- Most (disambiguation)
