= Champagne in popular culture =

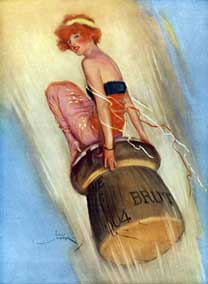
Grape-Shot: 1915 English magazine illustration of a woman riding a champagne cork

Champagne has featured prominently in popular culture for over a century, due in part to a long history of effective marketing and product placement by leading champagne houses and their representatives, such as CIVC. In time this created an association of champagne with luxury and exclusivity. The popularity and positive attributes associated with champagne have caused many other sparkling wine producers not located in the French wine region of Champagne to controversially use the name "champagne" to describe their wines.

== Early history ==
Although sparkling wine was invented in the Limoux area of Languedoc in 1535, the wine we know today as champagne was first produced in the French region of the same name around 1700. For centuries prior to this, still wine from the region had been served as part of coronation festivities throughout Europe, and the French aristocracy had offered it in tribute to foreign kings, associations with celebration and occasion which survive to the present day.

When the méthode champenoise was introduced into the region, its ready association with luxury and power brought the unique sparkling wine from Champagne to the fore. The leading practitioners devoted considerable energy to creating a history and identity for their wine, associating it and themselves with nobility and royalty. Careful advertising and marketing associated champagne with prestige, luxury, festivities and rites of passage, coinciding with an emerging middle class looking for symbols of upward mobility.

== Popular demand ==
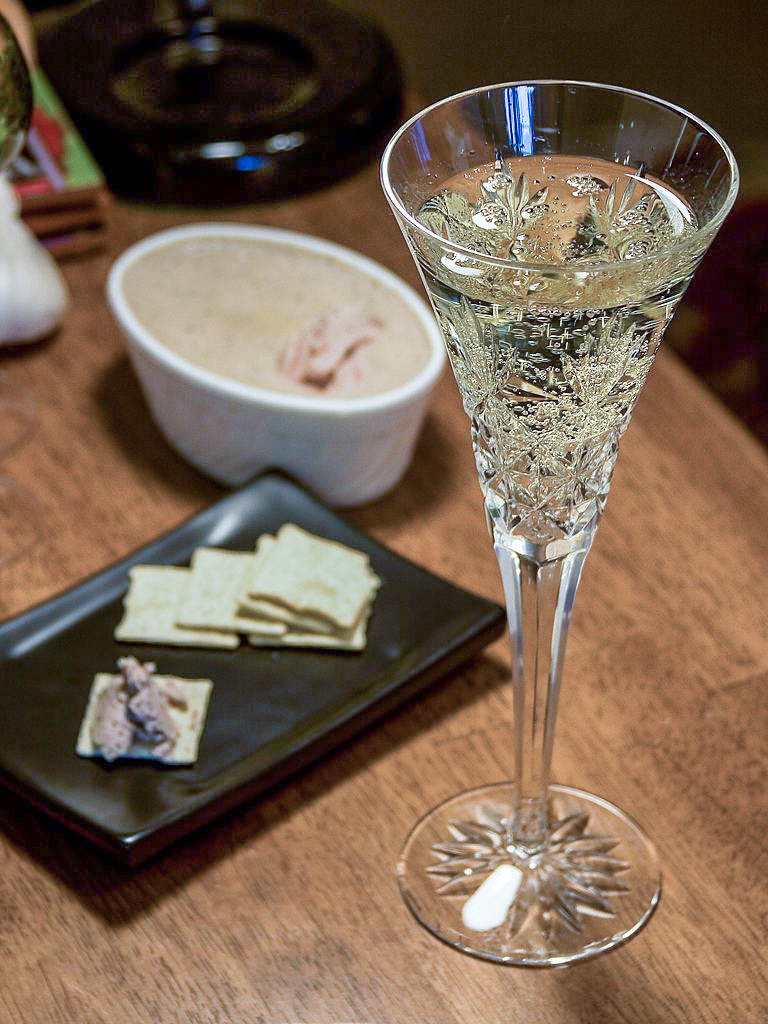
A traditional fluted Champagne glass, shaped to best display the wine's effervescence

Successful marketing during the Industrial Revolution helped to firmly establish champagne's reputation among the middle class and affluent elite of the time. The wine came to symbolize the "good life" to which all people could aspire. It also brought charges of decadence and indulgence. As the American writer F. Scott Fitzgerald once commented, "Too much of anything is bad, but too much Champagne is just right."

Towards the end of the 19th century, with a new cohesion in social groups based on economic choices, the beginnings of consumer culture brought champagne to the fore as a delineator of class and status, becoming what has been described as a "centrepiece of bourgeois society". This came about in part by the usual, informal pursuit of traditional practices and social norms. However, there was a great deal of careful and deliberate generation of rituals and images surrounding Champagne, not by any one agency or department, but as a result of widespread commercial efforts to market and popularise its consumption.

The "story" of champagne wine was gradually re-told, effectively suppressing outdated and unfashionable ideas and images and promoting more desirable ones. This served not only the interests of champagne négociants but the French nation as a whole; by the First World War, champagne had become a prominent and powerful symbol of the nation's status as a producer of quality goods in general, and vanguard of style and culture worldwide. It became, in effect, a major symbol of France. During World War II, the British Prime Minister, Winston Churchill, once motivated the British forces with the claim "Remember, gentlemen, it's not just France we are fighting for, it's champagne!". The British had been particularly hard hit by interruptions in trade during both World Wars.

By this time, champagne had come to be seen not only as a luxury but as a worldwide cultural treasure.

== Marketing and placement ==
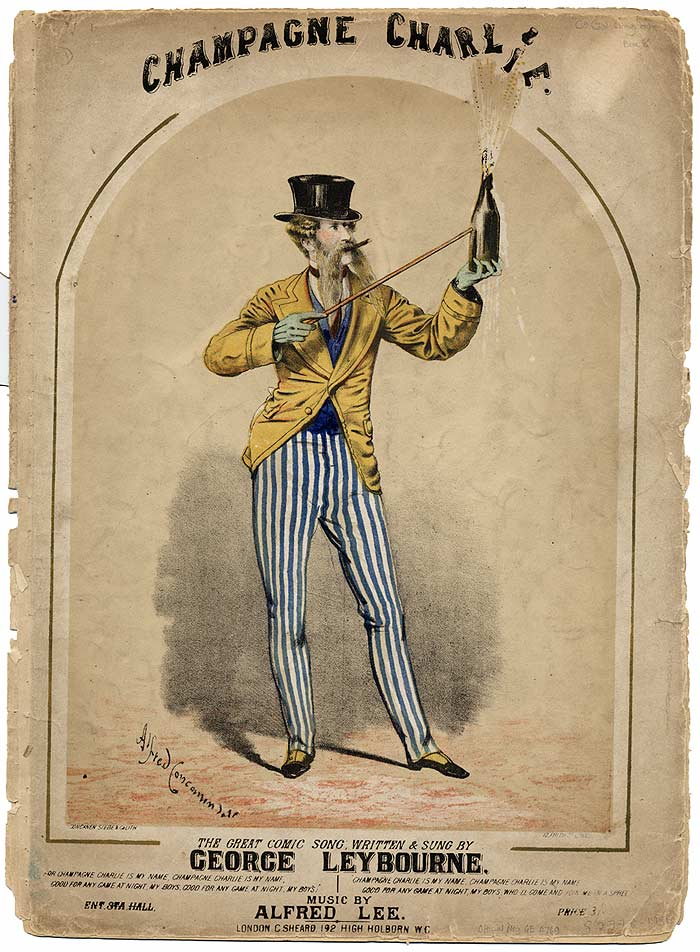
The music cover to George Leybourne's Champagne Charlie

In 1866 the famous entertainer and star of his day, George Leybourne, began making celebrity endorsements for Champagne. The Champagne maker Moët commissioned him to write and perform songs extolling the virtues of Champagne, especially as a reflection of taste, affluence and the good life. He also agreed to drink nothing but Champagne in public. Leybourne was seen as highly sophisticated and his image and efforts did much to establish Champagne as an important social status symbol. It was a marketing triumph, the results of which endure to this day. The marketing success of Champagne during the Belle Époque in export markets was remarked upon in 1882 by the British author and oenophile Henry Vizetelly on how Champagne had become mandatory at all launchings, inaugurations and celebrations.

== In art ==
Un bar aux Folies Bergère by Édouard Manet, completed in 1882, features several bottles of unopened champagne.

French producers commissioned a diverse range of artists to produce advertising material, most notably posters, which dramatically raised the profile of both producer and artist alike. The works are still recognised and highly prized for their artistic merit. The list includes:

- Pierre Bonnard
- Walter Crane
- Alfons Mucha
- Henri Toulouse-Lautrec

Champagne also makes a more informal appearance in paintings by masters such as:

- Édouard Manet in Un bar aux Folies-Bergère (1882)
- Théodule Ribot in Nature morte (1886)
- Paul Cézanne in Chez le Père Lathuile (1879) and Chaise, bouteille et pommes (1906)

Champagne has widely being portrayed as the drink of celebration for toasting returning heroes from war. The Best Years of Our Life's (1946), Coming Home (1976), The Deer Hunter (1977), and For Queen and Country (1988) are examples. It symbolically represents the joy of those who have their family members returning home whilst challenging the premise that war should be celebrated so highly through the use of champagne. More recently this is illustrated beautifully within the stage play 'Minefield' by Lola Arias (Argentina) by former Royal Marine Commando and performer Dr David Jackson through his deep psychological rejection of home coming whilst around him those that view the war from afar drink champagne.

== In literature ==
Champagne has important symbolic status in renowned literary works, such as:

- Émile Zola's Nana (1880)
- Alexander Pushkin's Eugene Onegin (1833)
- Johann von Goethe's Faust (1808)

In more popular literature – including periodicals and magazines such as Punch, La Vie Parisienne and Le Rire, and with humourists such as Richard Voigts, Honoré Daumier and John Leech – the wine became a vehicle for scathing satires of the elite and middle-classes.

== In music ==
In music from the era, especially in music hall and beer hall venues, tunes such as "Champagne Charlie" and "Ruinart-Polka" were very popular. The "Charles Heidsieck Waltz", after the pioneering Champagne producer, was an orchestral piece composed by Paul Mestrozzi which debuted in 1895 in honour of the Austrian emperor, accompanied by the presence of the wine itself.

The term "champagne music" was a term used by bandleader Lawrence Welk to describe a style of music akin to easy listening that Welk performed with his band. Trademarks of the "champagne music" style include a light and upbeat tempo, muted brass instruments, accordions, woodwinds (especially clarinets), pizzicato strings, and frequent use of staccato. "Champagne music" became widely recognized through Welk's national television show, which ran for 27 years.

Champagne has long been associated with stars of rock and pop music. In the song "Killer Queen" by Queen, Freddie Mercury is quoted as saying "She keeps Moet et Chandon in her pretty cabinet."

Since the late 1990s, high-end champagne brands have been featured in rap and hip hop music and videos; bottles featured in videos are often quite blingy and distinctive, often gold. The Louis Roederer brand Cristal, with a gold label, has seen increased popularity since the mid-to-late 1990s due to its association with rap and hip hop artists, notably the New York rappers Biggie Smalls (the Notorious B.I.G.), Puff Daddy, and Jay-Z. Since 2006, Cristal has seen a loss of popularity and some boycotts, notably by Jay-Z, due to statements perceived as racist, with other champagnes such as Armand de Brignac (gold bottle) making inroads.

In 2011, American duo LMFAO released a song entitled "Champagne Showers".

== In movies ==
Poster promoting the 1928 Hitchcock silent comedy "Champagne"

One of the longest-lasting associations of Champagne and popular culture belongs with Ian Fleming's fictional spy character James Bond, who is portrayed as a frequent drinker of Champagne prestige cuvées. A count of over 22 Bond films reveals 35 occasions on which the character was portrayed drinking Champagne, of which 17 were Bollinger, preferably Bollinger R.D., and 7 were Dom Pérignon.

Champagne has provided inspiration and a touch of exotica to many other Hollywood productions over the years. In 1928, Alfred Hitchcock's silent film Champagne famously begins and ends with a shot through the bottom of a Champagne glass. Billy Wilder's musical entitled The Champagne Waltz, a 1937 film with the tagline, "As gay and sparkling as a Champagne cocktail!", accentuates the perceived rivalry between traditional classical music and more popular, modern tunes: Champagne being the exciting, decadent newcomer, the waltz representing old-fashioned attitudes. Several other movies have given Champagne notable prominence., including the anthology comedy Four Rooms, where Quentin Tarantino's character has a whole monolog praising Cristal.

== As a colour reference ==
Although often bearing little actual resemblance to the colour of the wine itself, the superlative-sounding name "champagne" is frequently used as a descriptor for the pale, yellowy-beige metallic hue popular with buyers of prestige automobiles, also of the colour of some high-value equestrian livestock, and some gemstones, especially diamonds. In the case of diamonds, any colouration used to be considered a defect which lowered prices considerably, until the idea came up to associate certain hues with Champagne.

== Ritual and symbolic uses ==
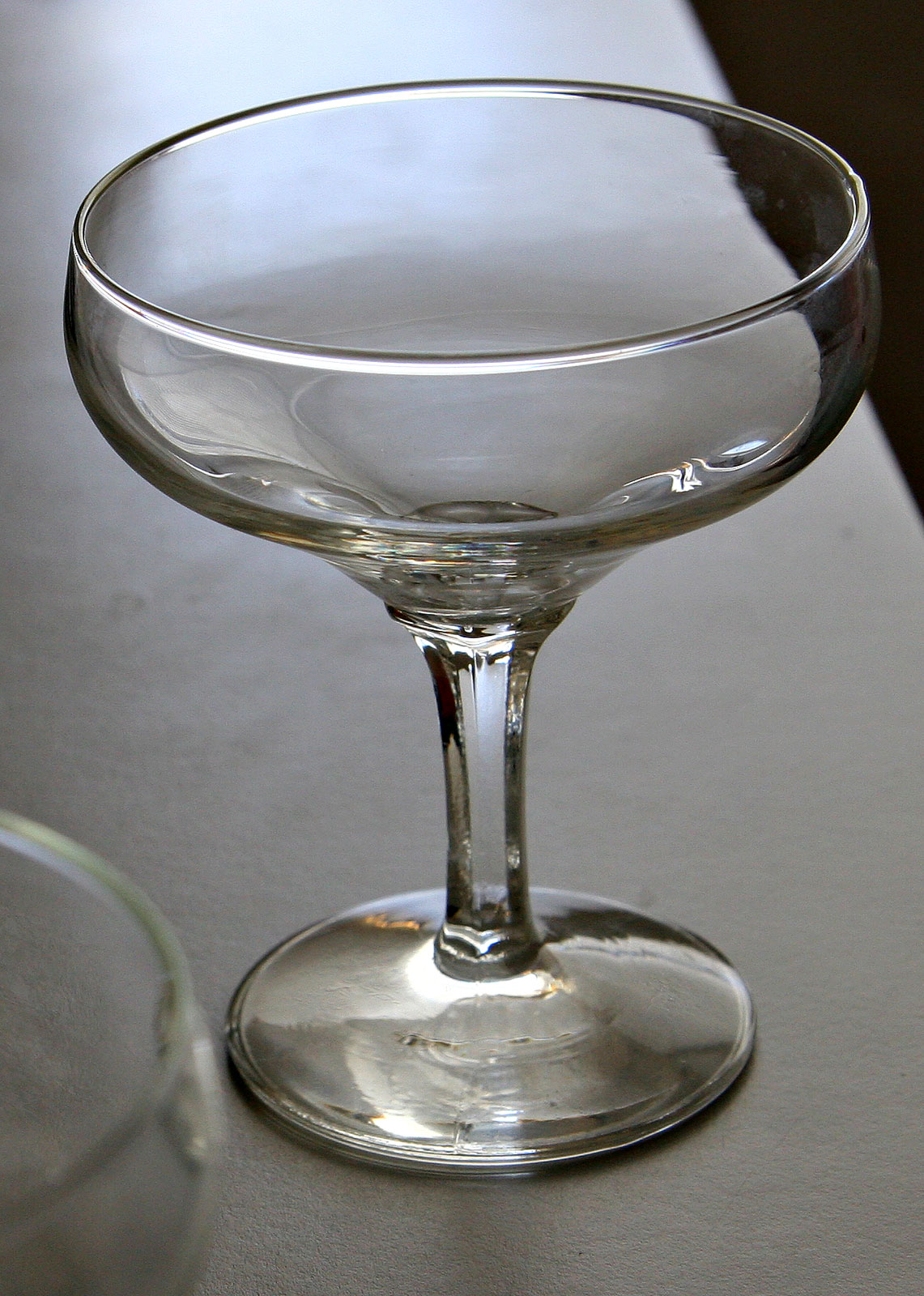
The Champagne coupe is erroneously claimed to symbolise aristocratic femininity

The iconic nature of Champagne has long been used as a means of effusive ritual celebration, in which the wine is not consumed so much as "sacrificed". The Champagne bottle traditionally smashed off the bow of a ship or aeroplane at its launch is believed to originate in the rather more reserved celebrations surrounding the christening of a baby. It is not uncommon to see champion sporting teams spraying bottles of champagne around their dressing rooms during celebrations, and indeed a bottle of champagne is a common gift to player-of-the-match award winners in football or cricket. The contents of a bottle agitated and sprayed over onlookers from the winners' podium of Formula 1 motor racing and other sports has origins in the earlier patronage of prestige sporting events by the social elite; the extravagant "waste" of the highly valued wine being an expression of the spirit of the Belle Époque. Rock band U2 famously end their concerts in similar fashion, spraying the audience with Champagne before leaving the stage. The act of pouring out champagne in the sink ("sinking") has arisen in Sweden due to a ban on spraying champagne in bars.

In a similarly extravagant vein, Marilyn Monroe was reputed to have taken a bath in 350 bottles of Champagne.

The "saucer" shaped glass is another Champagne icon associated with a celebrity sex symbol. The Champagne coupe is often claimed to have been modeled on the shape of the breast of a French aristocrat, often cited as Marie Antoinette or Madame de Pompadour. This is almost certainly apocryphal, as the glass was designed especially for sparkling wine in England in 1663, preceding those aristocrats by almost a century, and sparkling Champagne itself by several decades.

== See also ==
- History of Champagne
