= NUST =

NUST may refer to:

- Namibia University of Science and Technology, Windhoek, Namibia
- Nanjing University of Science and Technology, Nanjing, China (or NJUST)
- National University of Sciences and Technology, Pakistan
- National University of Science and Technology, Zimbabwe
- Newcastle United Supporters Trust, an organisation representing fans of Newcastle United Football Club in England
- Norwegian University of Science and Technology, Trondheim, Norway
- Northeastern Huskies alpine ski team, the collegiate alpine ski racing team representing Northeastern University of Boston, MA

== See also ==
- University of Science and Technology (disambiguation)
