= The Most =

The Most may refer to:

== Music ==
- The Most (band), a Swedish beat band
- The Most (The Cruel Sea album), 1999
- The Most (Down to Nothing album), 2007
- "The Most", a song by Irving Berlin, c. 1952–1956
- "The Most", a song by Justin Bieber from Purpose, 2015
- "The Most", a song by Miley Cyrus from She Is Coming, 2019

== Other uses ==
- The Most (TV series), a 2000–2004 American history program
- The Most with Alison Stewart, a 2006–2007 American TV news program
- The Most, a 2024 novel by Jessica Anthony

== See also ==
- Most (disambiguation)
