= Moest =

Moest or MŒST or variation, may refer to:

== People ==
- Franz Welser-Moest (born 1960), Austrian conductor
- Hubert Moest (1877–1953), German filmmaker
- Karl Friedrich Moest (1838–1923), German sculptor

== Other uses ==
- Ministry of Education, Science and Technology (Kenya) (MoEST)

== See also ==
- Moët (disambiguation)
- Most (disambiguation), including Möst
- MEST (disambiguation)
