= Musters =

Musters is a surname. Notable people with the surname include:

- George Chaworth Musters (1841–1879), British Royal Navy commander and traveller
- Marcel Musters (born 1959), Dutch actor
- Pauline Musters (1878–1895), the shortest woman ever recorded
- William Musters (1810–1870), English cricketer

== See also ==
- Muster (disambiguation)
