= Muster drill =

Maritime drill to practice for emergency evacuations

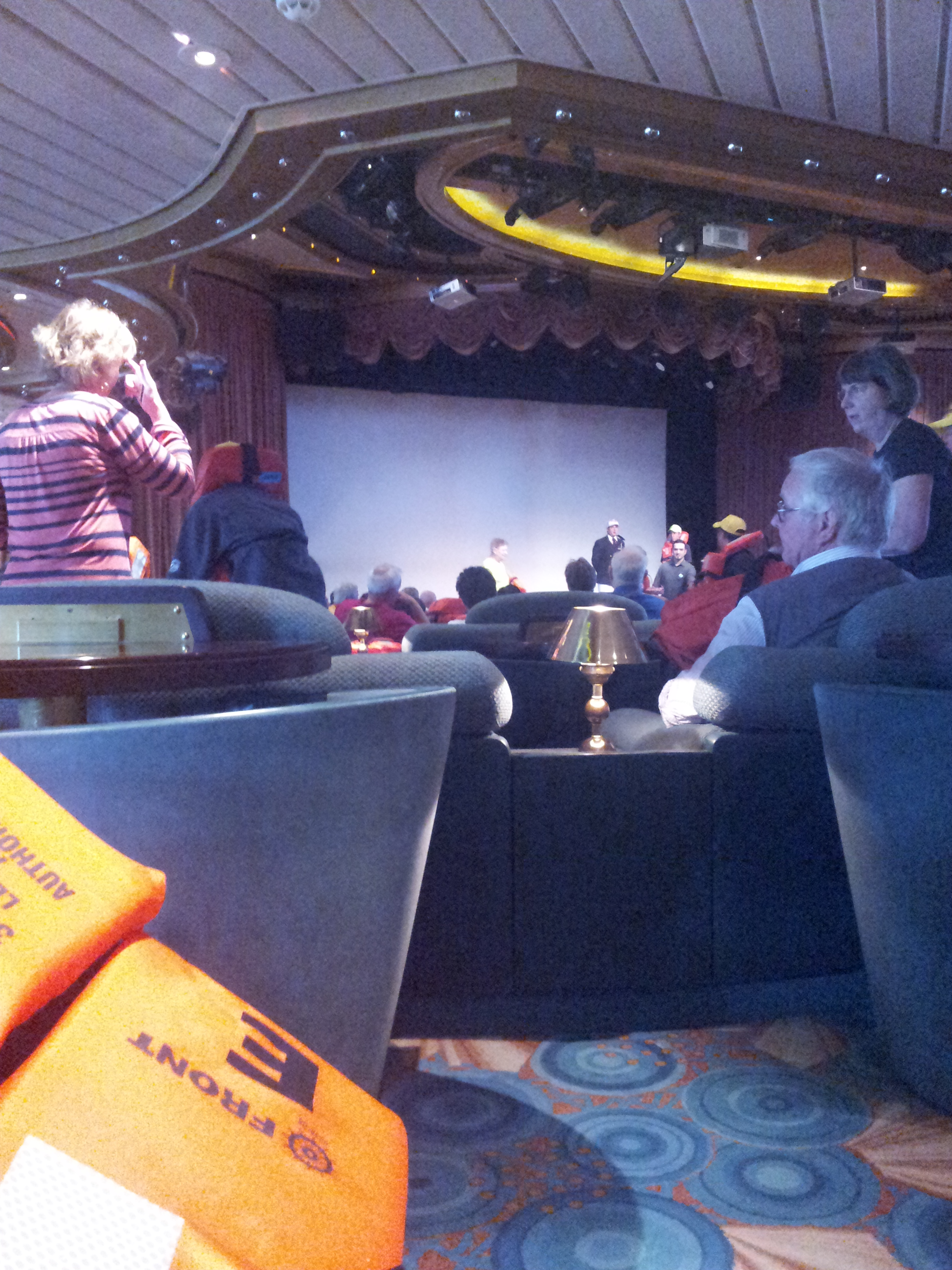
A muster drill in progress on the Coral Princess

A muster drill, sometimes referred to as a lifeboat drill or a boat drill, is an exercise that is conducted by the crew of a ship prior to embarking on a voyage. A muster drill prepares passengers for safe evacuation, in the event of an emergency on board the ship, and familiarizes the crew and the passengers with escape routes. In a muster drill, the use of life vests and the escape routes from the ship are explained to the passengers. It is typically conducted approximately 30 minutes prior to the ship's scheduled departure time, and all guests must remain silent during the drill so that everyone will be able to hear the safety announcements from the captain. To alert that the drill is in progress, a general emergency alarm is sounded, and the captain then explains what the passengers need to do.

== Description ==
As required by the International Convention for the Safety of Life at Sea, a passenger muster drill must be conducted by the ship within 24 hours of departure. However, in the wake of the Costa Concordia disaster, many cruise lines choose to conduct the drill before the ship departs port for the first time. It is the responsibility of the crew to ensure that a muster drill is held and that every passenger and crew member is aware that it is being held. If a muster drill cannot be held, a report in the logbook must be made to state the circumstances.

Laws in some places hold crew members liable to face civil charges if they voluntarily do not attend the muster drill. For example, in some US states, those who do not attend are fined varying amounts, depending on their rank.

Muster drills are typically not conducted and are usually not required for short trips on the water, such as those taken on ferries, dinner cruises, and riverboats. On ferries, a safety briefing delivered through the PA system alerts passengers to the sound pattern of the emergency alarm and what to do if the signal is heard.

== Announcements ==
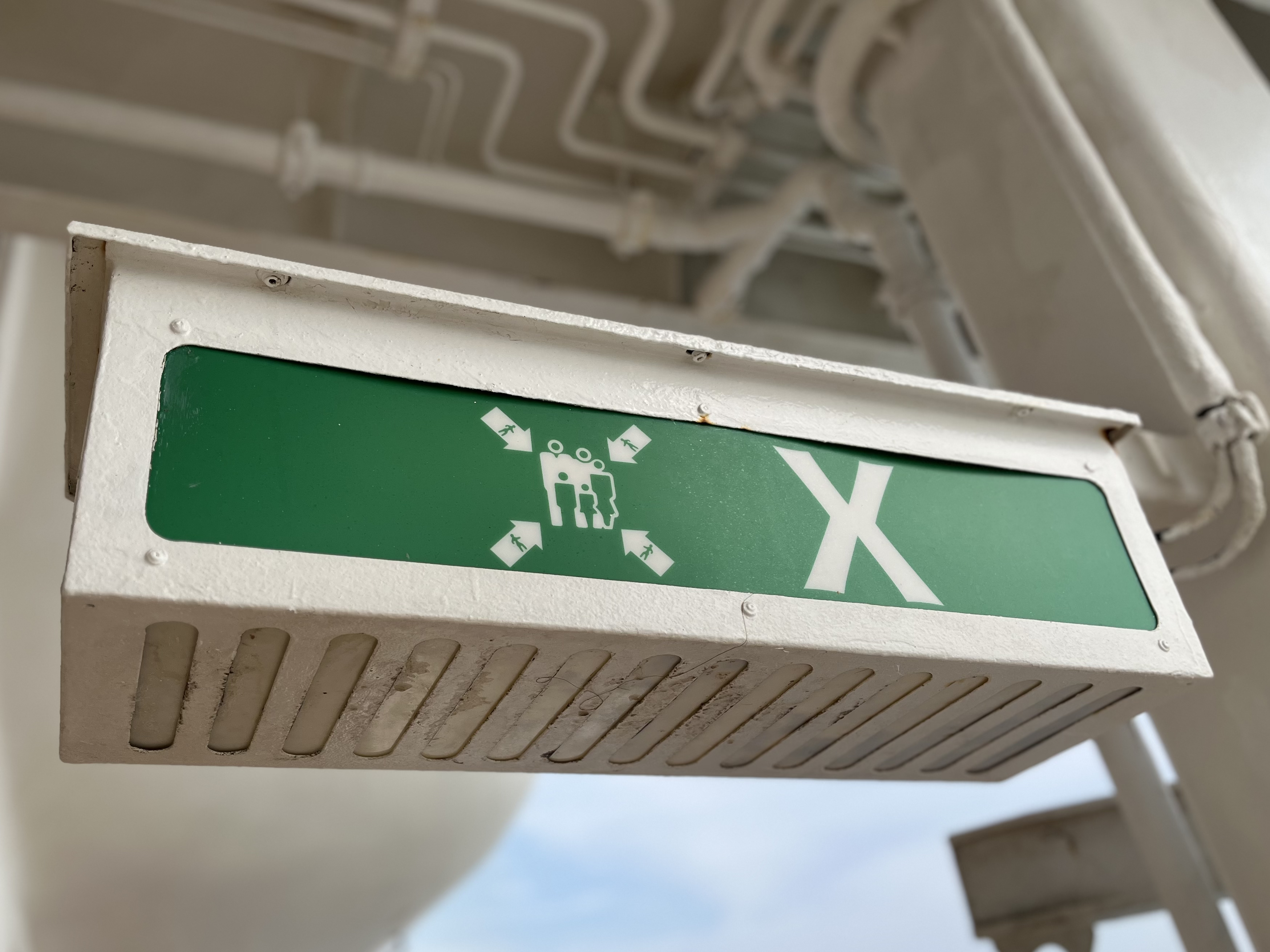
A muster assembly point signpost

International Maritime Organization (IMO) muster station sign

International Standards Organization (ISO) muster station sign

Generally, the muster drill is taken in simple instructions:

1. An announcement is normally made to passengers, informing them that a mandatory muster drill will begin shortly.
2. Then, another announcement is made, informing crew and passengers, that the "general emergency alarm" is about to be sounded for exercise purposes only.
3. After the alarm has been sounded, passengers are told to then make their way to their muster station.
4. Upon reaching their muster station, passengers are informed of the use of life jackets, lifeboats, etc.
5. A final signal is made, informing that the muster drill is concluded.

== Alarm signal ==
The standard pattern for the general emergency alarm onboard a cruise ship.

The "general emergency alarm" consists of seven or more short blasts followed by one long blast of the ship's horn or whistle (some lines do not sound the signal on the horn or whistle) and by the ship's internal alarm (such as fire alarm bells accompanied with flashing strobe lights in corridors and public areas for hearing impaired) and PA systems with a tone.

== Time ==
Since the 2012 Costa Concordia disaster, all cruise ships have been required to perform the muster drill before the ship leaves port. This change was made because most passengers aboard the Costa Concordia stated that they had not been through the drill and did not know where the lifeboats were. Its length varies, depending on the size of the ship and the co-operation of passengers. The time taken to get all passengers into lifeboats and to maneuver away from the ship is regulated by the International Maritime Organization and must be accomplished in 30 minutes.

== See also ==
- Women and children first
- Muster list
- Muster point
- Airline safety video - similar procedure on commercial airplanes
