= Claude Moët =

French winemaker and wine merchant (1683–1760)

Claude Moët (French: [klod mɔɛt]; 1683–1760) was a French vintner and wine merchant who founded the Champagne house that later became Moët et Chandon. Moët was the first winemaker in Champagne to exclusively produce sparkling wine.

An expert salesman, Moët advocated the importance of personal contact with customers. During the 1730s, he networked extensively within the royal circles of Versailles and soon became one of few merchants accredited to serve the royal court. One of his most loyal customers was Madame de Pompadour. Following his death, the champagne house went to the control of his grandson Jean-Rémy Moët.

== Family history ==
The American journalists Don and Petie Kladstrup argue that the Moët family can trace its origins to an alleged Dutch soldier named LeClerc who fought alongside Joan of Arc in the Hundred Years' War, fending off English attempts at preventing the crowning of Charles VII. As a reward for his service, the French king changed the man's name to Moët. This story is far-fetched, although Moët does indeed originate from a nickname. From 1351, we find in Reims the trace of three échevins succeeding one another from father to son: Colart, then Pierrat and finally Jean Le Clerc, known as Moët (Joannes, dictus Le Clerc alias Moët) (register of the deliberations of the Reims metropolitan chapter, 1402). In the fourteenth century the family was called Le Clerc, and was nicknamed "LeMoët or Mouet" because of a pout that the first of the three échevins "was in the habit of doing". The word comes from old French moe, that is to say "mouth", then by extension "pout". It was not uncommon at this time for surnames to be nicknames characterizing and differentiating people.

== See also ==
- List of wine personalities
