= Muster list =

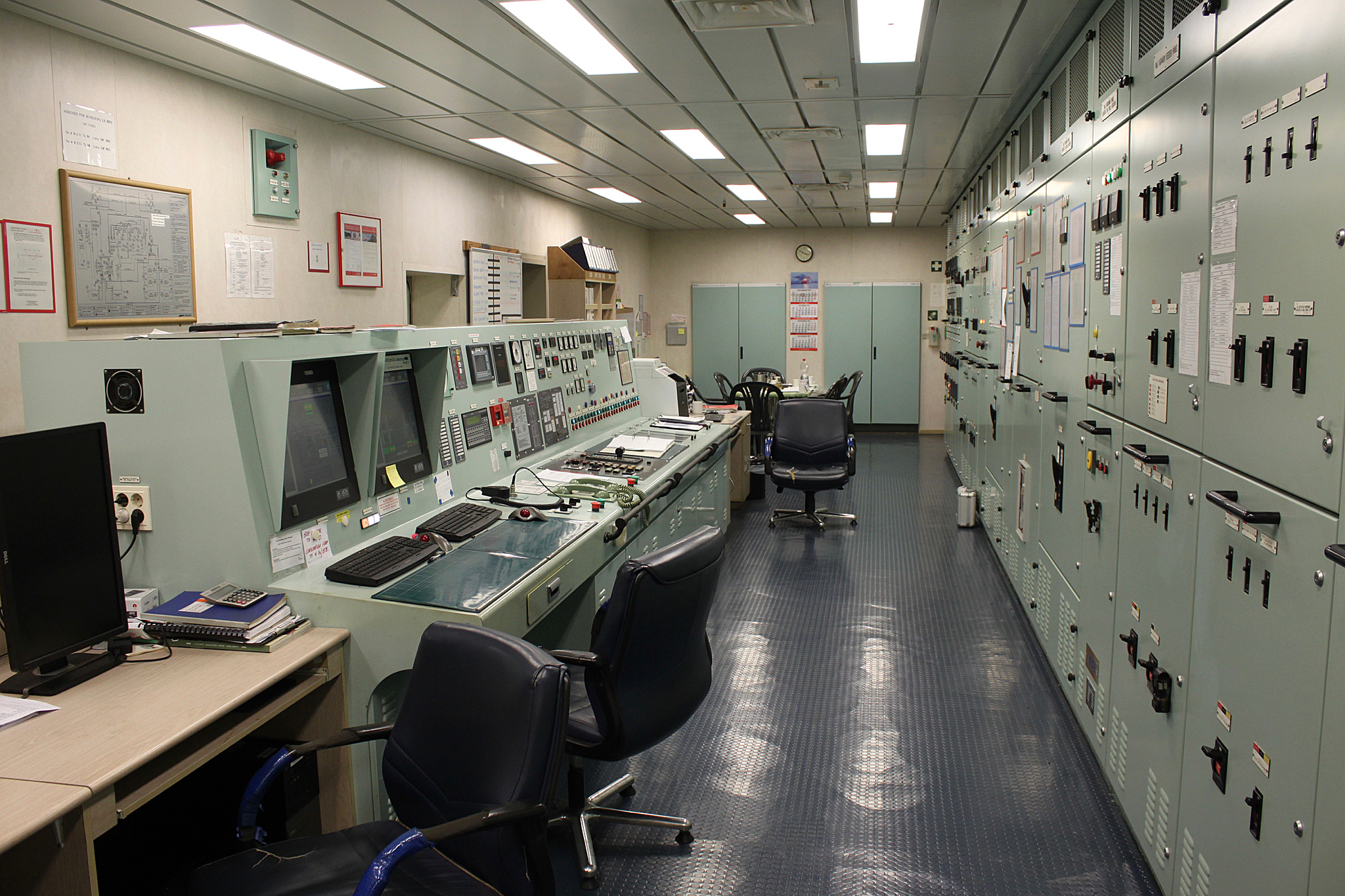
Muster lists are displayed in key areas, typically affixed to the bulkhead of the ship, in key areas such as the engine control room (shown)

The Muster List is a maritime safety document used on ships. It contains a list of all crew members and details the functions and duties each member of a ship crew is required to perform in case of emergency. These include fire-fighting duties and responsibilities for deploying life-saving arrangements such as lifeboats and liferafts. The Master of the ship must ensure the muster list is kept up to date, typically delegating this to a junior officer.

On passenger ships, passengers only come to face with the duties and functions of the crew included in the Muster List during the muster drills.

== Requirements ==
A muster list is required for ships under the SOLAS Convention Chapter III - Part A. Additionally, States may also impose requirements for muster lists on ships in domestic regulations, an example being the Maritime and Coastguard Agency MGN 71.

The muster list must be publicly displayed around the ship. Examples of where a muster list is posted include the bridge, engine room (engine control room) and each accommodation alleyway.

The muster list must be written in both the language of country of the ship registration and at least also in English. In ships where the majority of the crew speaks a 3rd language, the Muster List should also be made available in that language.

The muster list for the ship is typically inspected during port state control inspections.

Small fishing vessels are not typically required to have muster lists but those over 45m in length are required to.
