= Kullo Must =

Estonian film producer

Kullo Must (18 March 1911 – 10 August 1987) was an Estonian film producer who worked extensively in Estonian-language film production of the 1960s and 1970s.

He worked on the film Aeg elada, aeg armastada in 1976. His last film was Karge meri, released in 1981.

== Filmography ==
- Karge meri (1981) (producer)
- Tuulte pesa (1979) (producer)
- Surma hinda küsi surnutelt (1977) (producer)
- Aeg elada, aeg armastada (1976) (producer)
- Röövpüüdjajaht (1975) (producer)
- Indrek (1975) (producer)
- Verekivi (1972) (producer)
- Don Juan Tallinnas (1971) (producer)
- Varastati Vana Toomas (1970) (producer)
- Kevade (1969) (producer)
- Libahunt (1968) (producer)
- Keskpäevane praam (1967) (producer)
- Null kolm (1965) (producer)
- Supernoova (1965) (producer)
- Ohtlikud kurvid (1961) (producer)
- Ühe küla mehed (1961) (producer)
- Vallatud kurvid (1959) (producer)
- Esimese järgu kapten (1959) (producer)
- Pöördel (1957) (producer)
- Kui saabub õhtu (1955) (producer)
