= Most, Istria County =

Most
- Village
- Location within Croatia
- Coordinates: 45°24′09″N 13°57′57″E
- Country: Croatia
- County: Istria
- Municipality: Buzet

Area
  - Total: 1.5 sq mi (4.0 km^{2})

Population (2021)
  - Total: 71
  - Density: 46/sq mi (18/km^{2})
- Time zone: UTC+1 (CET)
  - Summer (DST): UTC+2 (CEST)
- Postal code: 52420 Buzet
- Area code: 052

Most is a village in Istria, Croatia.

== Demographics ==
According to the 2021 census, its population was 71.
