= Ministry of Education, Science and Technology =

Ministry of Education, Science and Technology may refer to:

- Ministry of Education, Science and Technology (Kenya)
- Ministry of Education, Science and Technology (Kosovo)
- Ministry of Education, Science and Technology (Nepal)
- Ministry of Education, Science and Technology (South Korea)
- Ministry of Education, Science and Technology (South Sudan)

== See also ==
- Ministry of Education, Culture, Sports, Science and Technology, Japan
- Ministry of Education (Science and Technology), Myanmar
- Ministry of Education, Science and Technological Development (Serbia)
