= Michèle Moet-Agniel =

French Resistance member

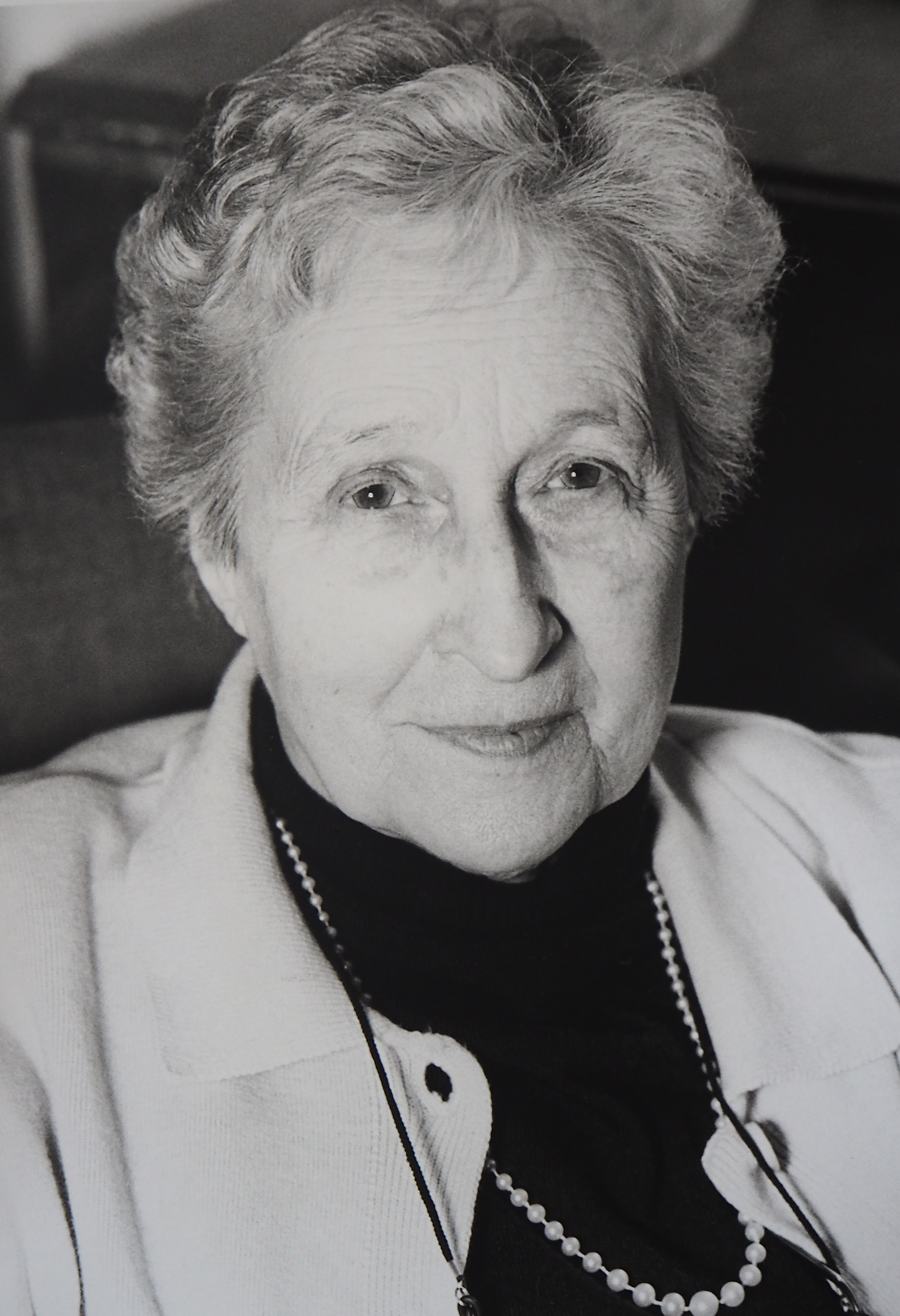
- Agniel in 2005
- Born: Michèle Moet; 11 June 1926 (age 100); Paris, France
- Military career
- Allegiance: France
- Branch: French Resistance
- Service years: 1940–1945
- Unit: Burgundy Network
- Conflicts: World War II

Michèle Moet-Agniel (born 11 June 1926) was a member of the French Resistance, distributing leaflets and later helping Allied aviators escape back to Britain. She was arrested and deported to the Ravensbruck concentration camp, but was rescued by Russian soldiers. After the war, Agniel became a teacher.

== Early life ==
Michèle Moet-Agniel was born Michèle Moet in 1926 in Paris to a French World War I veteran and a Dutch immigrant.

== World War II ==
At the outbreak of World War II, Moet-Agniel, then 14, was on vacation with her family at Fort-Mahon-Plage. They stayed there until May 1940, returning to Paris on foot. Her family became supporters of Charles de Gaulle's Free French Army. Moet-Agniel's activities in the Resistance began with graffiti art near the Porte de Vincennes of the Free French emblem. In November, Moet-Agniel's former English teacher gave tasked her with retrieving a bundle of leaflets from Versailles and distributing them.

From their home in Saint-Mandé, the Moets hid French, British, and American soldiers and provided them with false documents for the Burgundy Network. Moet-Agniel's father, working at his local town hall, forged and recycled the documents of deceased French citizens so that the errant Allied personnel could receive German-rationed food.

In October 1943, aged 17, Moet-Agniel accompanied a member of her network to Britain and would personally assist downed Allied aviators getting to England.

=== Arrest and deportation ===
On 28 April 1944, German officials arrested the Moets with two Englishmen. They were taken Nogent-sur-Marne, then to Fresnes Prison. The family escaped torture, but were deported to Germany on 15 August, just before the liberation of Paris. Moet-Agniel's father died in Buchenwald in March 1945 while Moet-Agniel and her mother were interned at Ravensbruck. They were freed when the Red Army reached the camp on 5 February 1945, then were repatriated to Paris on 21 June.

== Post-war ==
For her role in the escape of several Allied servicemen, Moet-Agniel received a number of distinctions from France, the United States, and the United Kingdom. When Elizabeth II and Philip visited Paris 1948, Moet-Agniel was presented to them.

After the war, Moet-Agniel resumed her education, became a teacher, and married a Mr. Agniel. In the 1980s, she testified against Holocaust denial as a witness.

== Legacy ==
A street in the French town of Migné-Auxances is named after Moet-Agniel. Bobbie Ann Mason's 2011 novel The Girl in the Blue Beret is based on Moet-Agniel's activities in the Resistance and particularly her aid of Mason's father-in-law.

Moet-Agniel was given an American flag that had flown over the US Capital on behalf of Senator Johnny Isakson.

== Honors and awards ==
- Commander of the Order of Legion of Honour (2023)
- Croix de guerre 1939-1945
- Resistance Medal
- Cross of the Resistance Volunteer Combatant
- Medal of Freedom
- King's medal for courage
