= Northeastern Huskies alpine ski team =

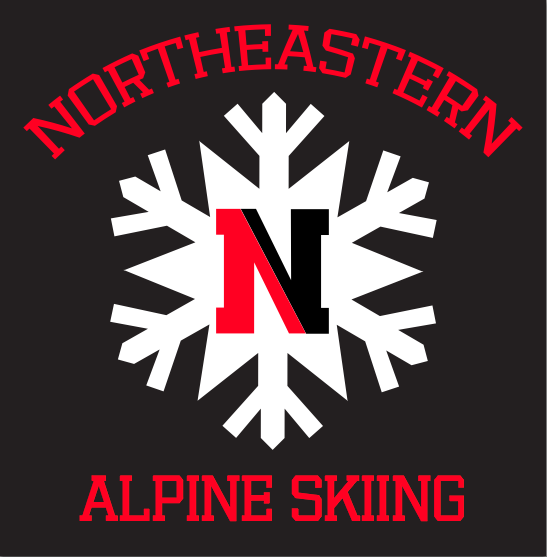
- University: Northeastern University
- Skiing association: United States Collegiate Ski and Snowboard Association
- Conference: ECSC; Thompson Division
- Location: Boston, Massachusetts
- Home mountain: Ski Bradford
- Nickname: America's Team
- Colors: Red and black
- Years active: 1971–2012, 2013–present

USCSA national championships
- 16th place (2016 men), 11th place (2014 women)

ECSC Regional championships
- 6th place (2016 women), 5th place (2016 men)

Thompson Division championships
- 4 (2014–2015 men & women)

The Northeastern Huskies Alpine Skiing team is a United States Collegiate Ski and Snowboard Association (USCSA) alpine skiing program that represents the Northeastern University. The Huskies are a member of the Thompson Division in the Eastern Conference (ECSC). They are currently based out of the main Northeastern University campus in Boston, Massachusetts.

The team is currently composed of 13 female and 13 male racers, skiing as individual teams for scoring purposes only. Since their school-sanctioned suspension for the entirety of the 2013 season, both teams went first in 8 of 11 regular season races during the 2014 season to handily win both Thompson Division championships, ski to their highest-place regionals finish in the past 15 years, and make their first team appearances at the USCSA National Championship in team history. So far, NUST has improved on last years marks, with the men's team winning 7 of a possible 9 season races and the girls winning all 9, the first time a team has gone undefeated during the Thompson Division regular season. Both teams advanced to the 2015 ECSC regionals held at West Mountain Ski Area, NY. Both the men's and women's teams also advanced to the 2016, 2017, and 2018 ECSC regionals events, also held annually at West Mountain, NY.

== History ==
Northeastern boasted one of the best ski teams on the East Coast from the mid 1950s until late 1970s. In fact, it had the largest team budget on the East Coast- exemplified nicely by a huge Mercedes bus for weekend transportation. Ed Elliot was the Director of Alumni Affairs and coach in the late 60's and early 70's. Unfortunately, the program was cut due to budget restrictions at the university, which spanned the '80s and early 1990s. Finally, in 1992, student Michael Alekson reinstated the men’s team as a club sport (to be quickly followed by the women's side). NU consistently placed in the top 3 teams in the McBrine Division of the then NCSA (National Collegiate Ski Association, the predecessor to the USCSA). After 4 years in the McBrine Division, new head coach Chris Haigh along with team captain David McGrath strategically moved the Huskies into the more competitive Thompson Division; not only was the level of talent much greater in the new division, but races were closer in location relative to Boston, and also pitted NU against intra-city rival schools such as Boston University and Tufts. Fittingly enough, the Thompson Division in which Northeastern still competes was named after a decorated NU ski coach from the 1960s. Following a temporary one year hiatus, Dan Wigmore and Victoria Hone reformed the team for the 2014 season. The team quickly returned to form and has experienced great success since then.

=== Season-by-season standings ===
Season standings may only be traced to their archival inception of 1999, and are as follows:

==== Men's team ====
Year	Overall Record (Places)												Overall Division Standing	Regionals	Nationals	Head coach
Year	1	2	3	4	5	6	7	8	9	10	11	12	Overall Division Standing	Regionals	Nationals	Head coach
1999	6	7	10	8	7	7	8	8	6	7			8th			Chris Haigh
2000	6	8	7	7	7	8	8	7	7	7	7	6	7th			Chris Haigh
2001	5	6	6	7	8	7	6	5		4	7	6	6th			Chris Haigh
2002	Season standings vacated															
2003	3	4	4	3	2	3	3	3	3	3	4	4	3rd	9th		Chris Haigh
2004	9	8	10	9	10		9	10	10	10	10	10	10th			Chris Haigh
2005	7	5	10	8	8	11	5	9	4	2	9	3	8th			Chris Haigh
2006		6	7	7	9	10	9	9	7	10		6	9th			Chris Haigh
2007	3	7	5	5	6	6	5	5	8			7	5th	T-11th		Chris Haigh
2008	7	6	7	6	5	5	7	4	5	7			6th			Chris Haigh
2009	6	7	2	5	6	4	6	4	5	5			5th			Chris Haigh
2010	2	3	4	3	4	2	3	2					T-2nd	T-9th		Chris Haigh
2011	3		2	3	3	2	4	3	4	4			3rd	8th		Chris Haigh
2012	2	4	2	1	1	1	3	4	6	4			3rd	7th		Chris Haigh
2013	University-sanctioned suspension															
2014	1	1	1	4	2	1	1	3	1	1		1	1st	5th	9th	Dan Hutner
2015	3	1	4	1	1	1	1	1	4	1			1st	6th		Maddie Whittier
2016	1		1	1	1	1	1	1	1				1st	5th		

==== Women's team ====
Year	Overall Record (Places)												Overall Division Standing	Regionals	Nationals	Head coach
Year	1	2	3	4	5	6	7	8	9	10	11	12	Overall Division Standing	Regionals	Nationals	Head coach
1999	9	4	9	8	6	7	9	7	6	7			8th			Chris Haigh
2000	3	5	8	8	7	8	8	8	5	3	8	8	7th			Chris Haigh
2001	8	7	5	6	6	5	5	6		5	4	7	6th			Chris Haigh
2002	Season standings vacated															
2003	7	8	7	7	9	9	10	10	8	7	8	8	8th			Chris Haigh
2004	10	9	9	9	10		10	10	9	10	10	10	10th			Chris Haigh
2005	7	5	10	9	11	11	8	8	8	8	9	10	8th			Chris Haigh
2006		9	9	8	10	10	3	8	9	4		1	7th			Chris Haigh
2007	10	2	2	3	1	2	4	5	3			2	3rd	T-11th		Chris Haigh
2008	1	3	4	4	4	3	4	3	3	4			3rd	9th		Chris Haigh
2009	3	4	5	4	6	2	2	8	3	8			4th	T-9th		Chris Haigh
2010	2	3	2	8	2	4	3	2					3rd	T-10th		Chris Haigh
2011	2		3	4	4	4	3	2	3	4			3rd	10th		Chris Haigh
2012	3	2	3	4	2	3	2	3	3	2			3rd	11th		Chris Haigh
2013	University-sanctioned suspension															
2014	3	1	1	1	2	1	1	1	2	1		1	1st	4th	11th	Dan Hutner
2015	1	1	1	1	1	1	1	1	2	1			1st	5th		Maddie Whittier
2016	1		1	1	1	1	1	1	1				1st	6th		

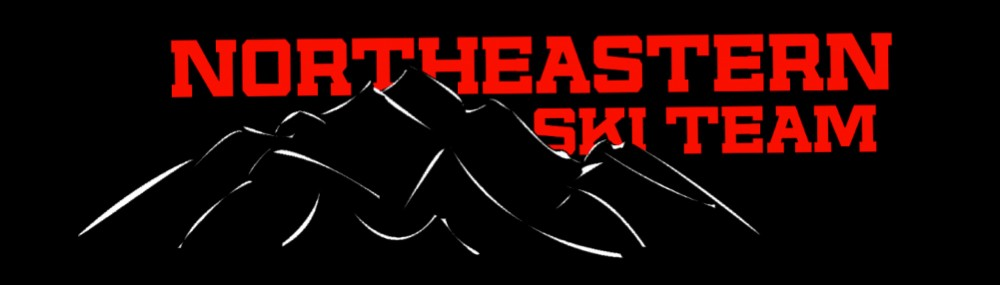
