= Battle of Champagne =

The Battle of Champagne is the name of several battles fought in the Champagne region of northern France during World War I:

- First Battle of Champagne (20 December 1914 – 17 March 1915)
- Second Battle of Champagne (25 September – 6 October 1915)
- Third Battle of Champagne (17 – 20 April 1917), or the Battle of the Hills (a diversionary attack for the better known Second Battle of the Aisne).
- Fourth Battle of Champagne (15 July 1918), part of the Second Battle of the Marne.

See also: First Battle of the Marne (5 – 12 September 1914), fought in Champagne.
