= Moët & Chandon =

French fine winery

Coordinates: 49°02′32″N 3°57′32″E

- Type: Part-holder of LVMH
- Industry: Winery
- Genre: French winery
- Founded: 1743; 283 years ago
- Founder: Claude Moët
- Headquarters: Épernay, Grand Est, France
- Area served: Worldwide
- Products: Champagne
- Revenue: €1.2 billion (2011)
- Number of employees: 1,715 (2011)
- Website: moet.com

Moët et Chandon
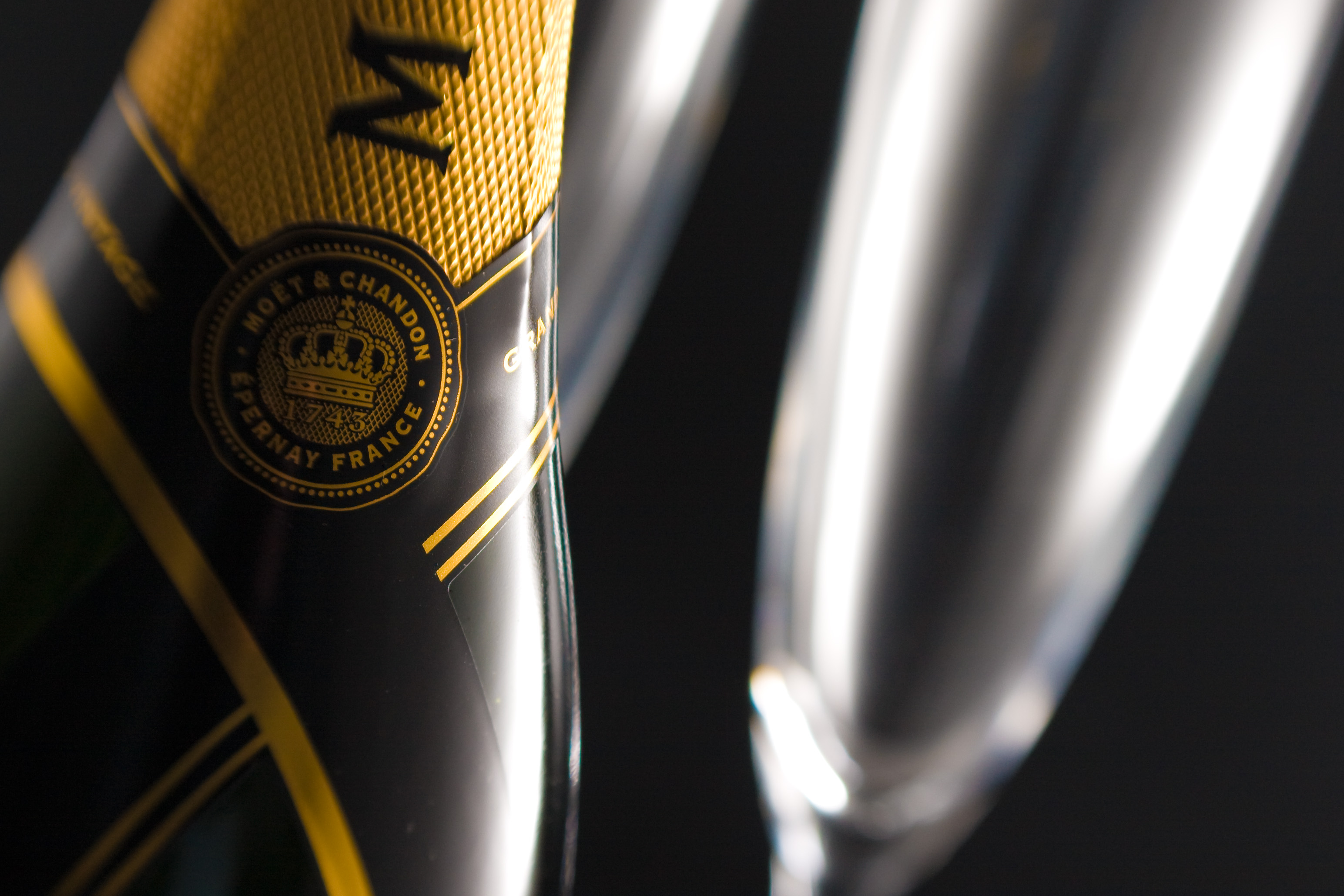
- Wine region: Épernay
- Appellation: Champagne
- Cases/yr: 2,000,000
- Known for: Dom Pérignon
- Varietals: Pinot noir, Chardonnay, Pinot Meunier
- Website: moet.com

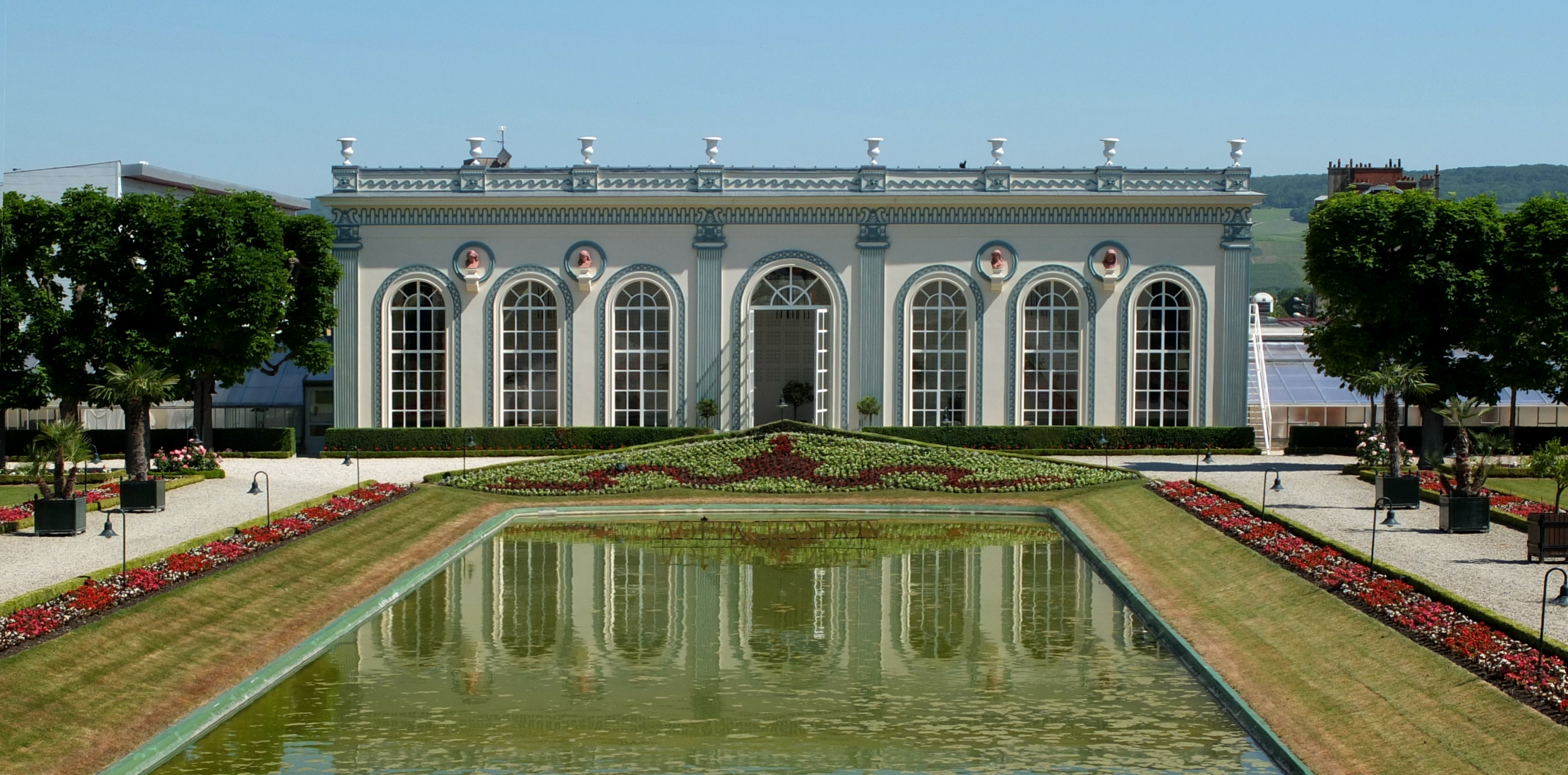
The Orangerie at Épernay

Moët & Chandon (French: [mɔɛt e ʃɑ̃dɔ̃]), also known simply as Moët, is a French fine winery and part of the luxury goods company LVMH Moët Hennessy Louis Vuitton SE. Moët et Chandon is one of the world's largest champagne producers and a prominent champagne house. Moët et Chandon was established in 1743 by Claude Moët, and today owns 1,190 hectares (2,900 acres) of vineyards, and annually produces approximately 28,000,000 bottles of champagne.

Moët is pronounced with a "t" at the end (IPA: [mɔɛt]; 'mo-et') as the French-born founder's surname is assumed to be of non-French origin—allegedly Dutch-German.

== History ==
Moët et Chandon began as Moët et Cie (meaning "Moët & Co."), established by Épernay wine trader Claude Moët in 1743, and began shipping his wine from Champagne to Paris. The reign of King Louis XV coincided with increased demand for sparkling wine. Soon after its foundation, and after son Claude-Louis joined Moët et Cie, the winery's clientele included nobles and aristocrats.

In 1833, the company was renamed Moët et Chandon after Pierre-Gabriel Chandon de Briailles, Remy Moët's son-in-law, joined the company as a partner of Jean-Remy Moët, Claude Moët's grandson.

Following the introduction of the concept of a vintage champagne in 1840, Moët marketed its first vintage in 1842. Their best-selling brand, Brut Imperial, was introduced in the 1860s. Their best known label, Dom Perignon, is named after the Benedictine monk remembered in legend as the "Father of Champagne". The brand was owned by Champagne Mercier but was given to Moët in 1927.

Moët & Chandon merged with Hennessy Cognac in 1971 and with Louis Vuitton in 1987 to become LVMH (Louis-Vuitton-Moët-Hennessy), the largest luxury group in the world, netting over 16 billion euros in fiscal 2004. Moët & Chandon was holding a royal warrant as supplier of champagne to Queen Elizabeth II.

In 2006, Moët et Chandon Brut Impérial issued an extremely limited bottling of its champagne named "Be Fabulous", a special release of its original bottle with decorative Swarovski crystals.

== Dom Pérignon ==
Dom Pérignon (/ˌdɒmpɛrɪˈnjɒn/; French pronunciation: [dɔ̃peʁiɲɔ̃]) is a brand of champagne produced by Moët & Chandon. It is named after Dom Pierre Pérignon, a Benedictine monk who was an important quality pioneer for Champagne wine but who, contrary to popular myths, did not discover the champagne method for making sparkling wines. Dom Pérignon was the first prestige cuvée, an idea proposed by Englishman Laurence Venn. The first vintage of Dom Pérignon was 1921 and was only released for sale in 1936. It is a vintage champagne, meaning that it is only made in the best years, and all grapes used to make the wine are harvested in the same year. Many champagnes, by contrast, are non-vintage, meaning that the champagne is made from grapes harvested in various years.

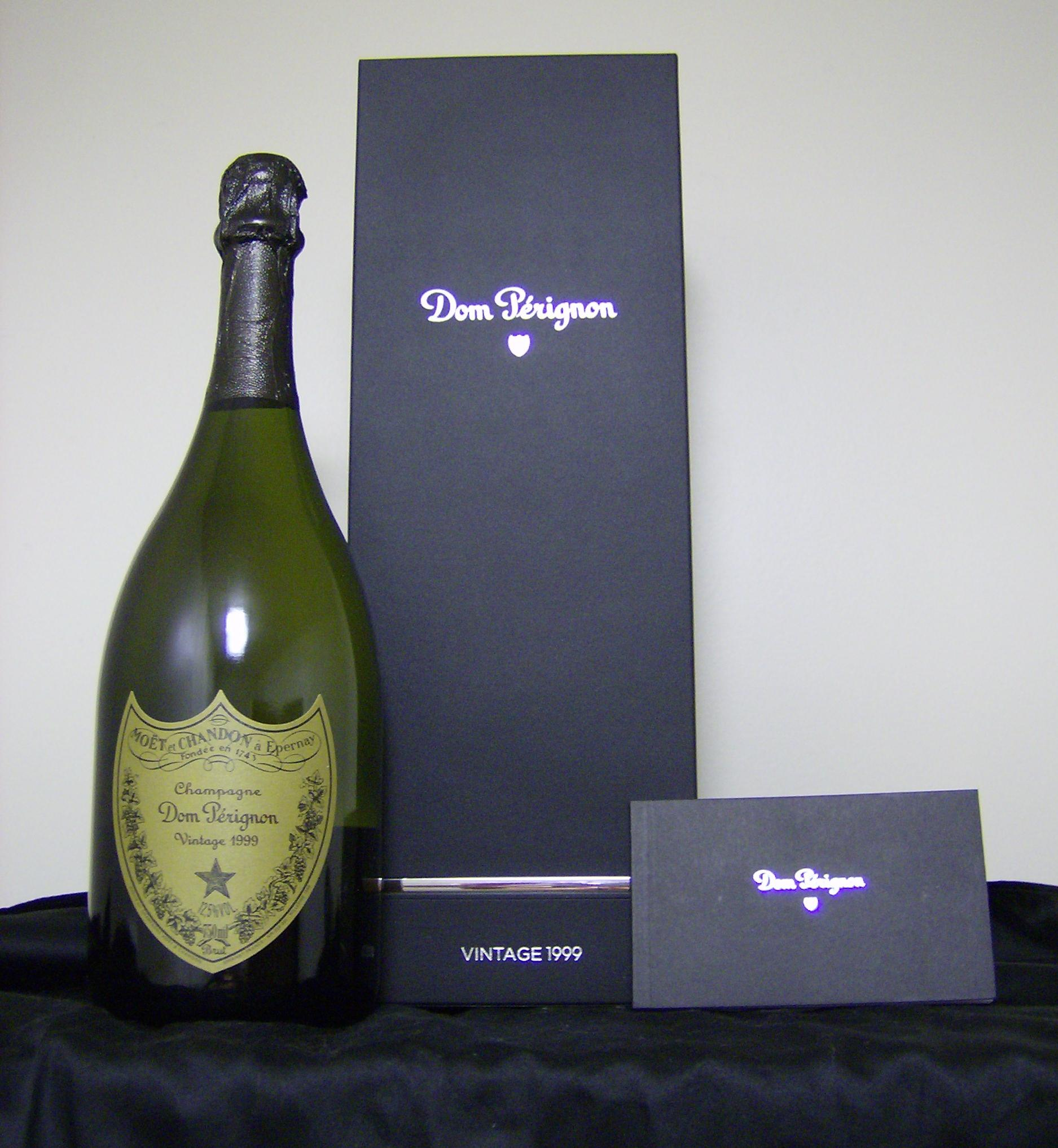
A bottle of vintage 1999 Dom Pérignon with accompanying materials

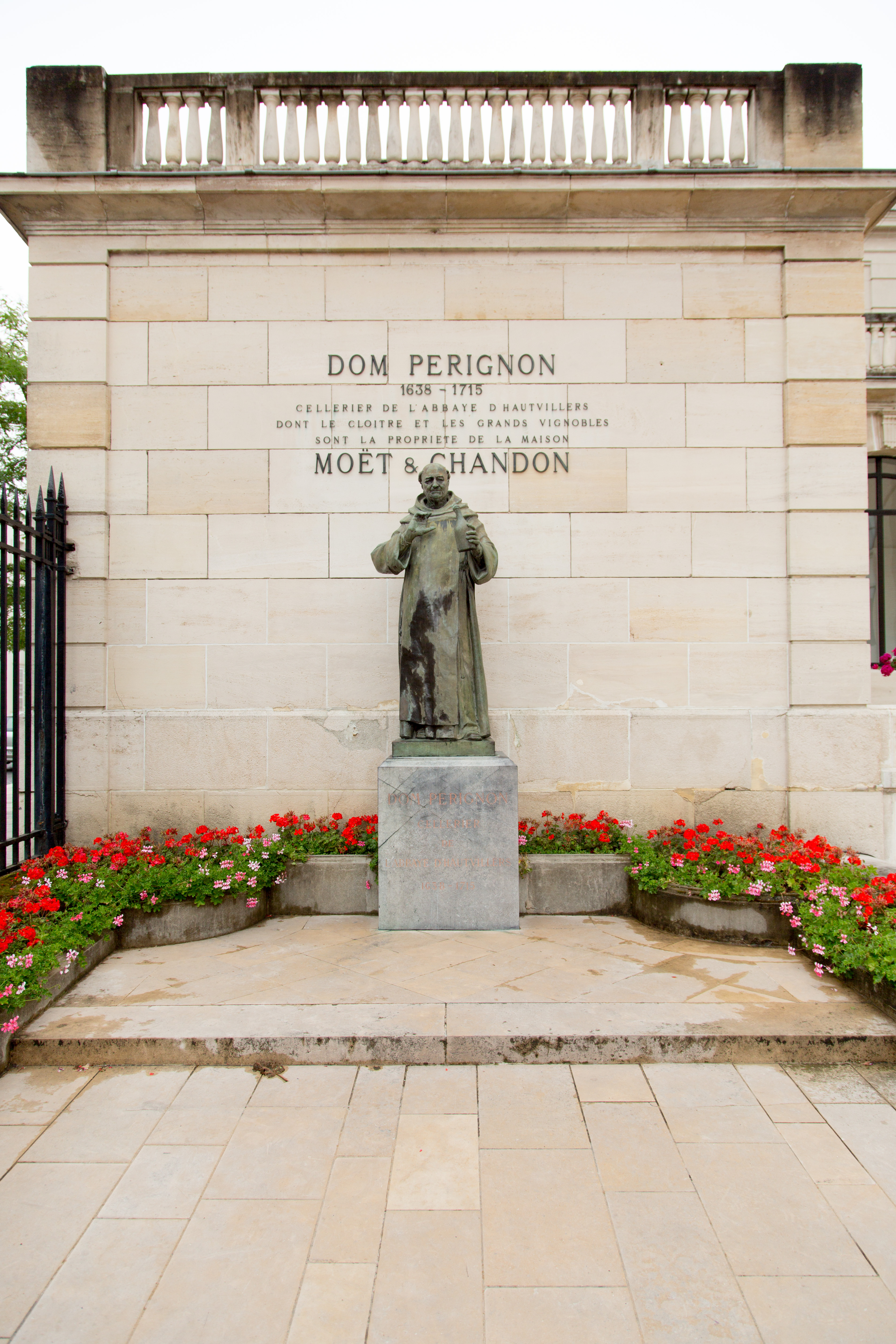
Statue of Dom Pierre Pérignon, a Benedictine monk

=== Current production ===
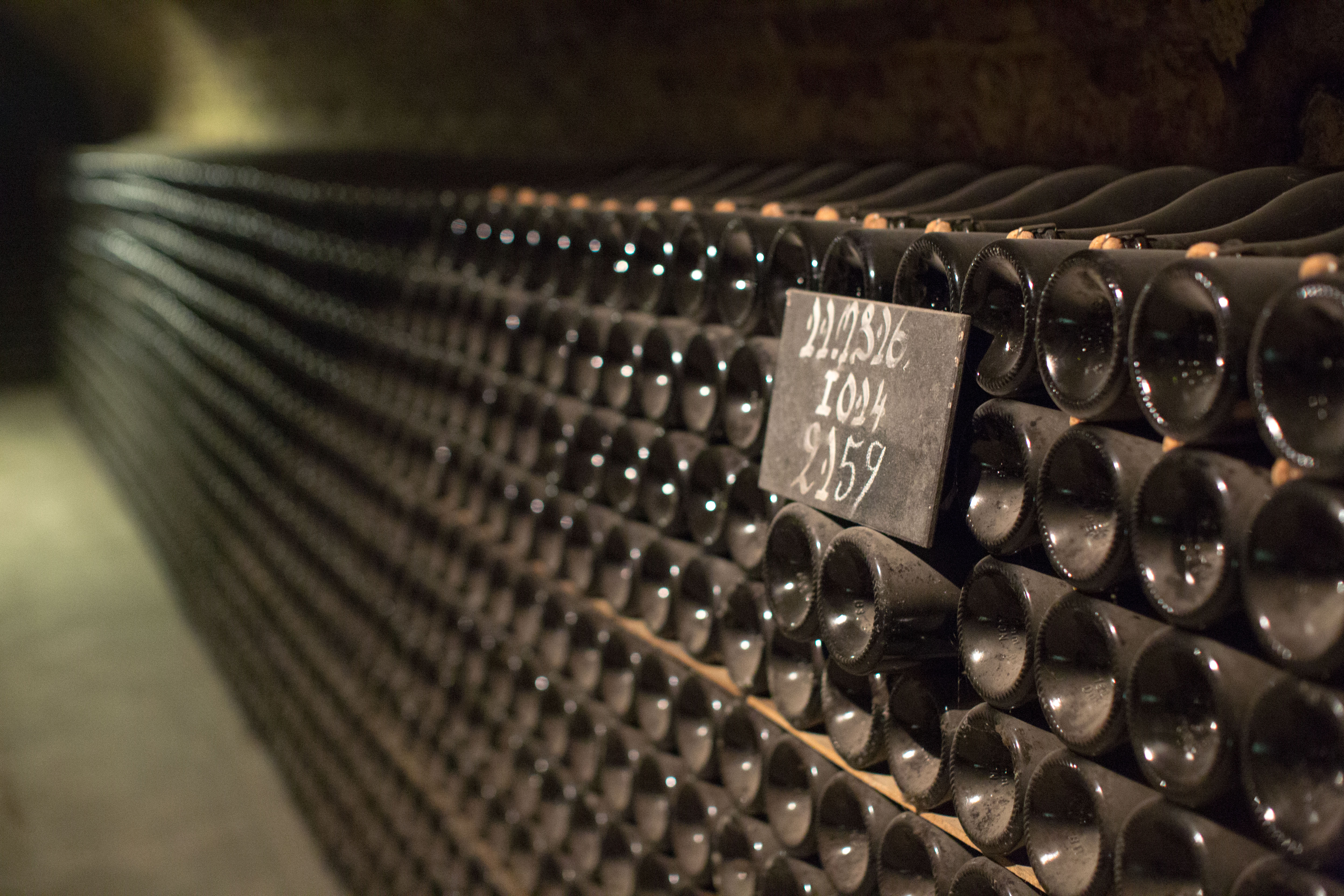
Bottles in the caves

Around 5 million bottles are produced in each vintage. The wine is 60% Chardonnay and 40% Pinot noir, with 6 g/L dosage. According to Tom Stevenson, "All vintages need at least 12 years ageing to nurture Dom Pérignon's signature silky mousse". As of 2020, the current release of Dom Pérignon is from the 2010 vintage and the current release of Dom Pérignon Rosé is from the 2006 vintage. As of 2017, the senior winemaker was Richard Geoffroy, who has been chef de cave for Dom Pérignon since 1990.

== Domaine Chandon ==
In 1973, the then Moët-Hennessy company founded Domaine Chandon, an outpost winery in the Napa Valley. It was the first French-owned sparkling wine venture in the United States. The fine dining restaurant étoile was located at the winery, until it closed in December 2014.

== Sponsorships ==
Moët was the official Formula One champagne provider between 1966 and 1999 and again from 2016 until 2017 when they signed a deal with champagne maker Carbon. They resumed their role as Formula One’s champagne supplier from the 2025 season onward.

On 30 November 2012, Swiss tennis player Roger Federer became Moët et Chandon's brand ambassador. On 30 September 2015, Chandon announced it would be a sponsor of the McLaren F1 team starting 2016.

== Incident ==
In June 2022, the Dutch Food and Consumer Product Safety Authority warned that the 3-liter champagne bottle from Moët & Chandon Ice Impérial contained MDMA, killing a person in Germany.

== See also ==
- List of Champagne houses
- Champagne in popular culture
- Champagne Riots – Early 20th century riots in France
