= Queens' College, Cambridge =

College of University of Cambridge

Coordinates: 52°12′07″N 0°06′53″E

Queens' College
- University of Cambridge
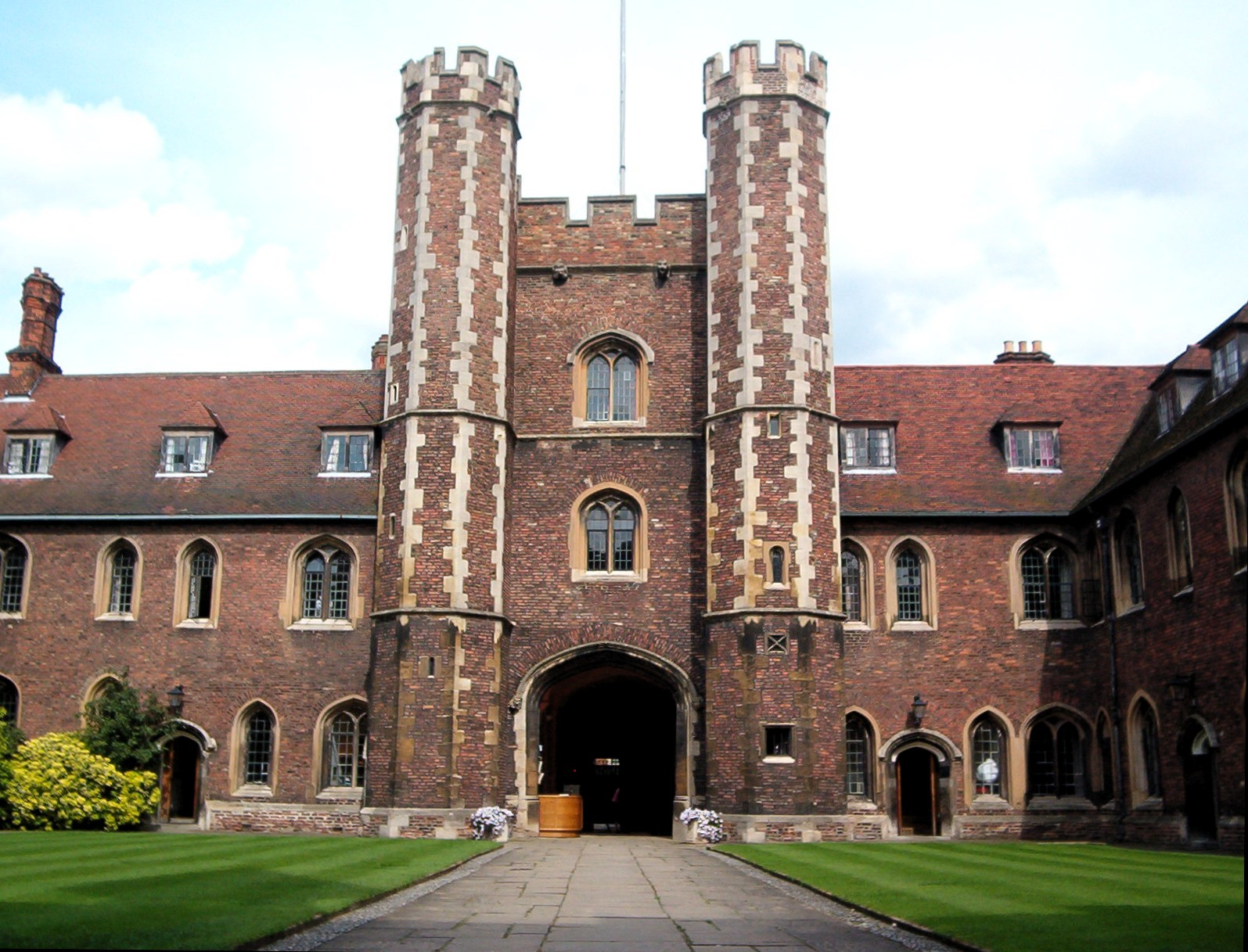
- Queens' College Gatehouse

- Arms of Queens' College, being the arms of Margaret of Anjou
Scarf colours: dark green, with two equally-spaced narrow white stripes
- Location: Silver Street (map)
- Full name: The Queen’s College of St Margaret and St Bernard, commonly called Queens’ College, in the University of Cambridge
- Abbreviation: Q
- Motto: Floreat Domus (Latin)
- Motto in English: May this house flourish
- Founders: Margaret of Anjou (1448); Elizabeth Woodville (1465)
- Established: 1448; 578 years ago Refounded 1465
- Named after: Margaret the Virgin; Bernard of Clairvaux
- Sister colleges: Pembroke College, Oxford; Ezra Stiles College, Yale; Osaka Gakuin University
- President: Menna Rawlings
- Undergraduates: 546 (2022–2023)
- Postgraduates: 544 (2022–2023)
- Endowment: £127.69 million (2023)
- Website: www.queens.cam.ac.uk
- JCR: qjcr.org.uk
- MCR: qmcr.org
- Boat club: Queens' College Boat Club

Map
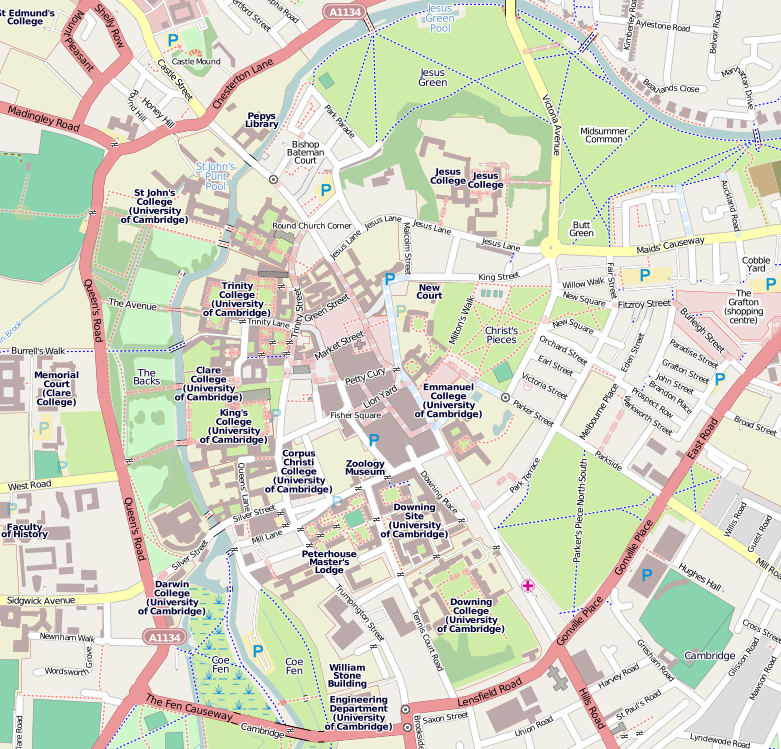
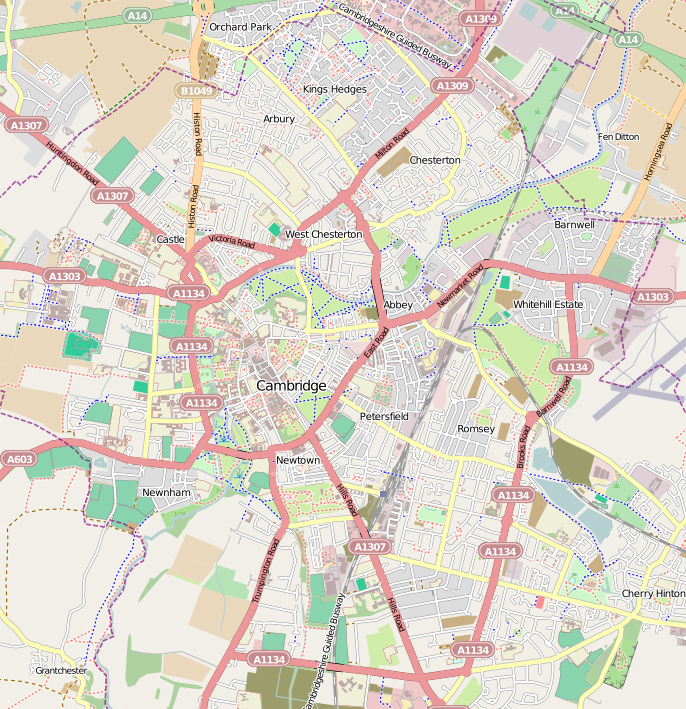
- Location within Central Cambridge Location within Cambridge

Queens' College is a constituent college of the University of Cambridge. Queens' is one of the 16 "old colleges" of the university, and was founded in 1448 by Margaret of Anjou. Its buildings span the River Cam with the Mathematical Bridge and Silver Street connecting the two sides.

College alumni include Desiderius Erasmus, who studied at the college during his trips to England between 1506 and 1515. Other notable alumni include author T. H. White; Israeli politician Abba Eban; founding father of Ghana William Ofori Atta; news presenter and journalist Emily Maitlis; actor and writer Stephen Fry; author and long-term BBC Rome and Vatican correspondent David Willey the Governor of the Bank of England Andrew Bailey; the British members of Parliament Stephen Kinnock, Liz Kendall and Suella Braverman; and Fields Medallist James Maynard. The college's first Nobel Prize winner is Sir Demis Hassabis who received this award in 2024 for developing artificial intelligence models.

It is a registered charity and as of June 2024, the college held non-current assets valued at £197 million. The current president of the college is British diplomat Dame Menna Rawlings, previously the British Ambassador to France. Past presidents include a number of notable figures, including the Catholic martyr John Fisher.

== History ==
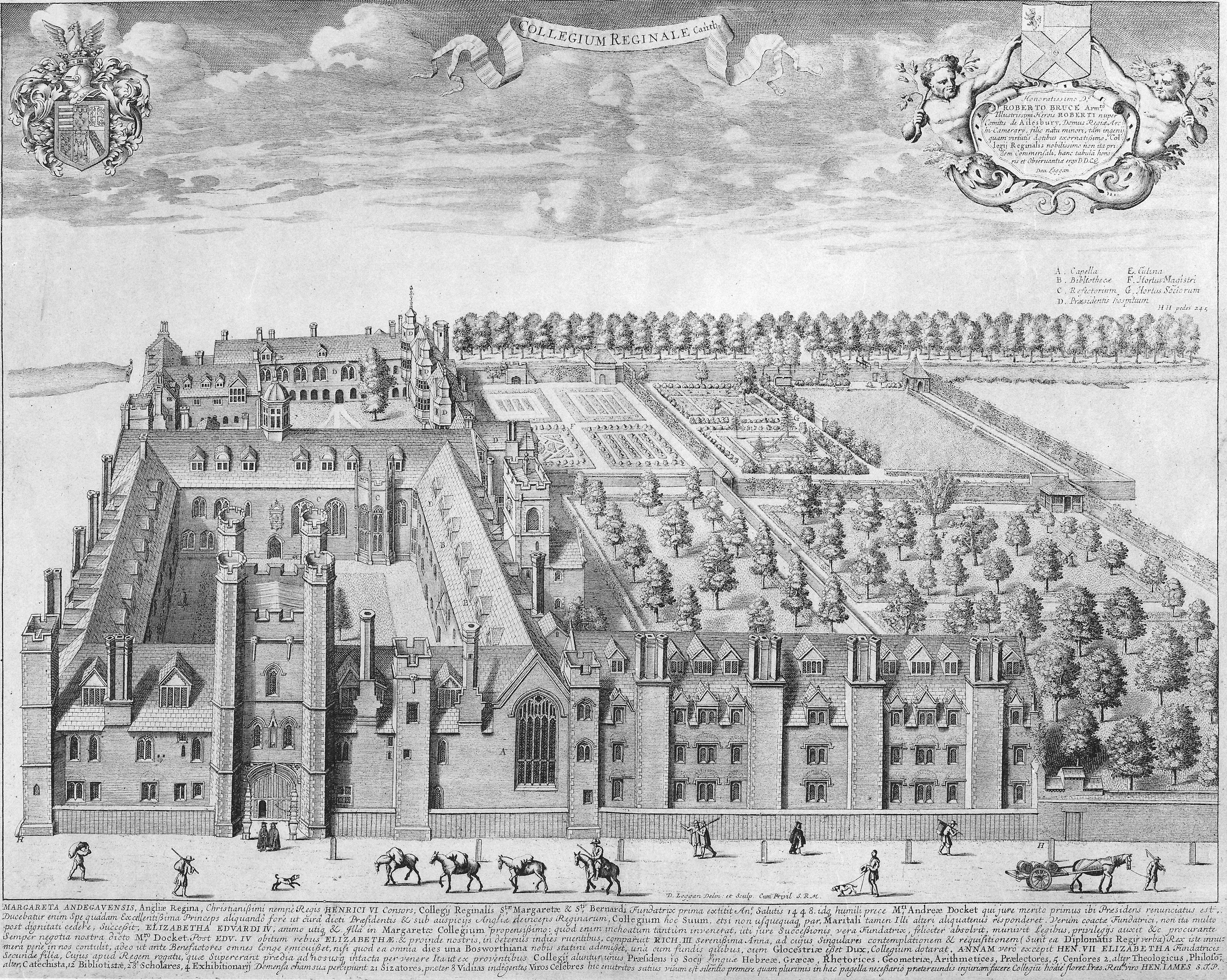
Bird's eye view of Queens' College, Cambridge by David Loggan, published in 1690

Queens' College was founded in 1448 by Margaret of Anjou and refounded in 1465 by the rival queen Elizabeth Woodville. This dual foundation is reflected in its orthography: Queens', not Queen's. Its full name is "The Queen's College of St Margaret and St Bernard, commonly called Queens' College, in the University of Cambridge".

In 1446 Andrew Dokett obtained a charter from Henry VI to found St Bernard's College, on a site now part of St Catharine's College. A year later the charter was revoked and Dokett obtained a new charter from the king to found St Bernard's College on the present site of Old Court and Cloister Court. In 1448 Queen Margaret received from her husband, King Henry VI, the lands of St Bernard's College to build a new college to be called "Queen's College of St Margaret and St Bernard". On 15 April 1448, Sir John Wenlock, chamberlain to Queen Margaret, laid the foundation stone at the south-east corner of the chapel.

By 1460 the library, chapel, gatehouse and President's Lodge were completed and the chapel licensed for service. In 1477 and 1484 Richard III made large endowments to the college and his wife, Anne Neville, became the third queen to be patroness of the college, making endowments on her own behalf, which were all taken away by Henry VII after he overthrew Richard. Between that time and the early 17th century, many improvements were made and new buildings constructed, including the Walnut Tree Building, which was completed in 1618. Since then the college has refurbished most of its old buildings and steadily expanded.

In the early 17th century Queens' had become a very fashionable college for the gentry and aristocracy, especially for those with more Puritan leanings.

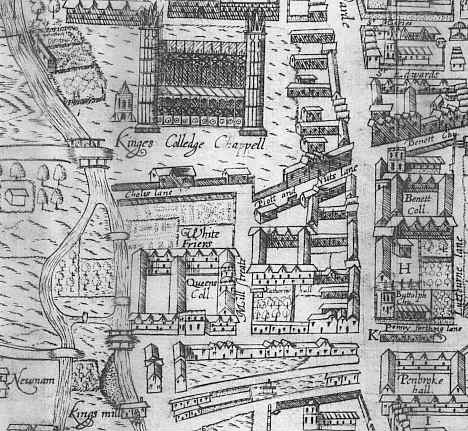
Plan of Queens' College, 1574

During the English Civil War the college sent all its silver to help the King. As a result, the president and the fellows were ejected from their posts. In 1660, the president was restored.

In 1777, a fire in the Walnut Tree Building destroyed the upper floors, which were rebuilt 1778–82. In February 1795 the college was badly flooded, reportedly waist-deep in the cloisters.

In 1823, the spelling of the college's name officially changed from Queen's to Queens'. The earliest known record of the Queens' College Boat Club dates from 1831. In 1862, the college's debating club, the St Bernard Society, was founded. In 1884, the first football match was played by the college team and the St Margaret Society, the music society, was founded.

In 1980, women were admitted as members for the first time, with the first female graduates in 1983.

== Coat of arms ==
The badge of Queens' College

The arms are the paternal arms of the first foundress queen, Margaret of Anjou, daughter of Rene, Duke of Anjou, with a difference of a bordure verte for the college. The six-quarters of these arms represent the six lordships (either actual or titular) which he claimed. These arms are of interest because the third quarter (Jerusalem) uses or (gold) on argent (silver), a combination which breaks the rule of tincture of "no metal on metal" in heraldry. The cross potent is a visual pun on the letters H and I, the first two letters of Hierusalem.

=== Badge ===
The silver boar's head is not the official arms of the college, but, rather, a badge; a white boar was the badge of Richard III. The earliest evidence of the college using a boar's head as a symbol is from 1544. The gold cross stands for St Margaret, and the gold crozier for St Bernard, the two patron saints of Queens' College. There is also a suggestion that the saltire arrangement of these (like the St Andrew's Cross) is an allusion to Andrew Dokett, the first president of Queens'. Today, this badge is widely used by college clubs, and also appears in connection with food or dining.

== Buildings and location ==
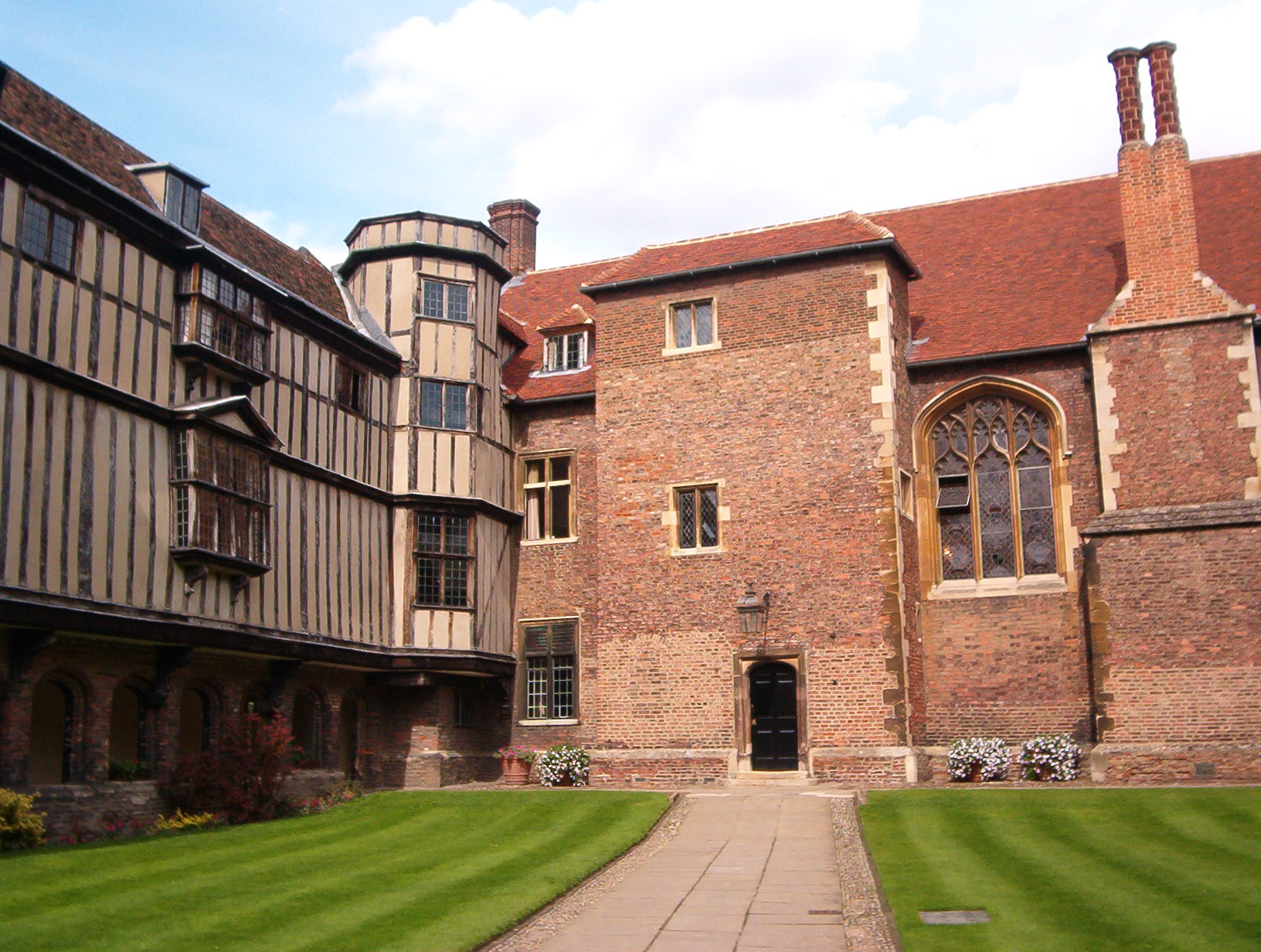
Cloister Court

Queens' is the earliest example of a complete purpose-designed college in Cambridge. The original building, which now constitutes Old Court, incorporates all necessary components of a medieval college in a single building: residences, dining hall, kitchens, library, and chapel. There are, of course, older colleges, some having absorbed older non-collegiate buildings, and older collegiate buildings, but none of those were built as a complete college from the outset. Unlike many colleges, which in the 18th century clad their buildings in classical stone and transformed their Gothic windows into rectangular sash windows, Queens' could not afford to, therefore leaving Old Court as one of the best-preserved medieval assemblages in the city.

Today, Queens' College has some of the most recognisable buildings in Cambridge. It combines medieval architecture and modern architecture in extensive gardens. It is one of two Cambridge colleges whose core buildings straddle the River Cam (the other being St John's). The two halves are joined across the river by the Mathematical Bridge. The two banks are colloquially referred to as the "light side" and the "dark side". Queens' College is located to the south of the centre of the city. It is the second southernmost of the colleges on the banks of the River Cam, primarily on the east bank.

=== Cloister Court ===
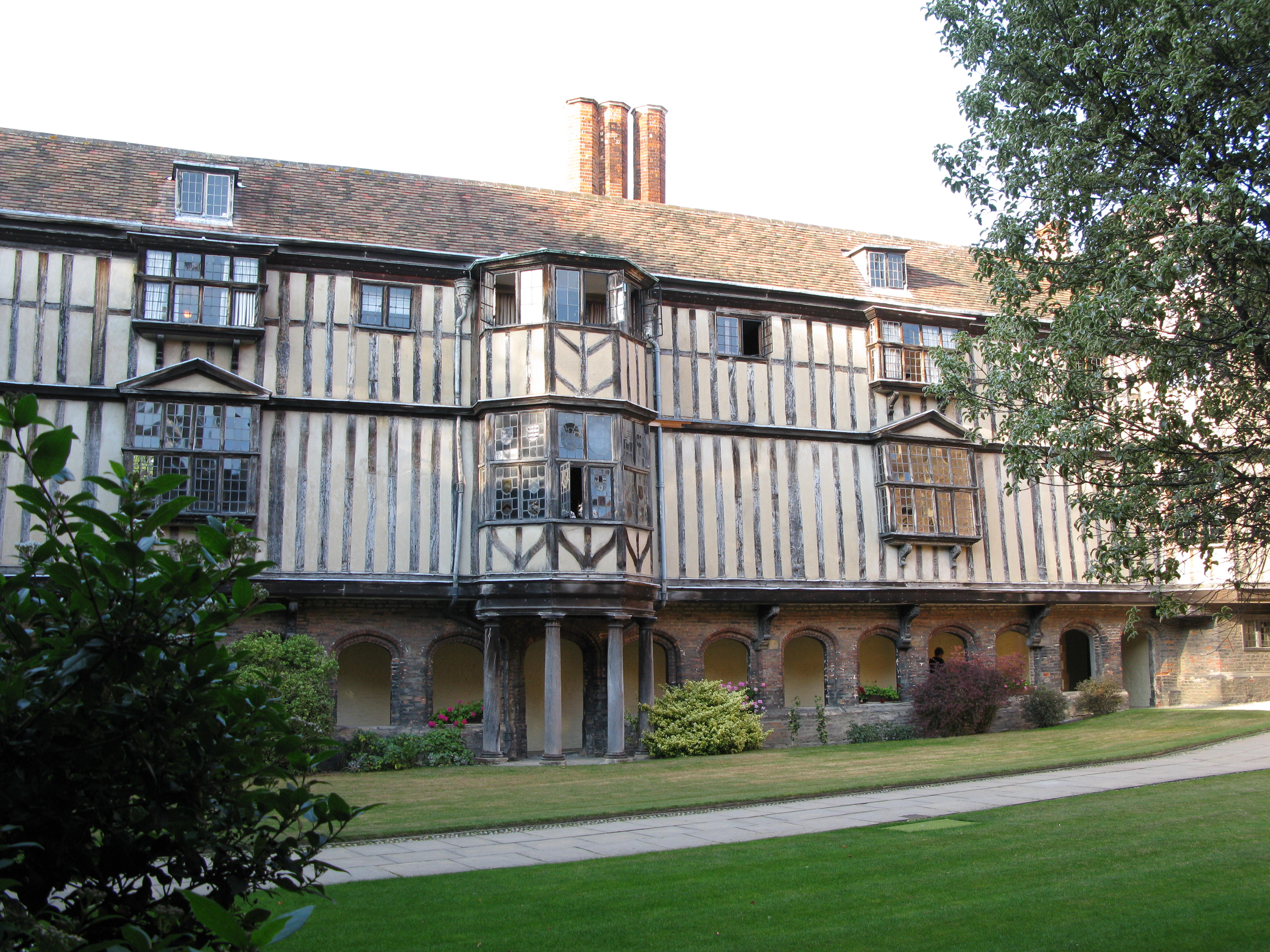
The President's Lodge, as seen from Cloister Court

The President's Lodge of Queens' is the oldest building on the river at Cambridge (c. 1460). The President's Lodge is part of Cloister Court: the Cloister walks were erected in the 1490s to connect the Old Court of 1448/9 with the riverside buildings of the 1460s, thus forming the court now known as Cloister Court. Essex Building, in the corner of the court, was erected 1756–60, named after its builder, James Essex the Younger (1722–1784), a local craftsman who had earlier erected the Mathematical Bridge.

=== Old Court ===
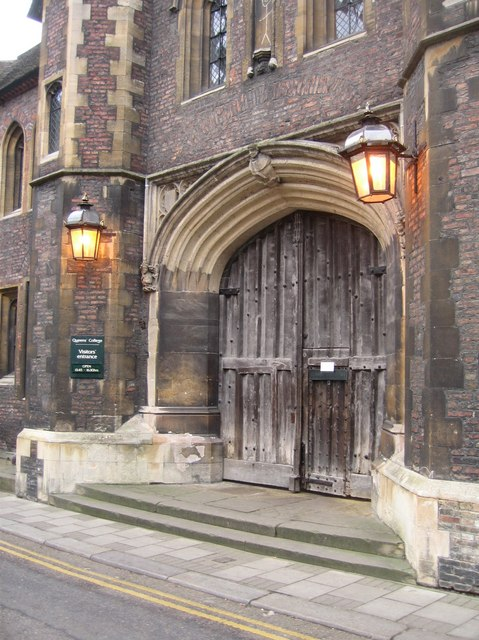
Queens' Great Gate

Old Court was built between 1448 and 1451. Stylistic features suggest that this was designed by and built under the direction of the master mason Reginald Ely, who was also at the same time erecting the original Old Court of King's College (now part of the University Old Schools opposite Clare College), and the start of King's College Chapel. Whereas King's was built using very expensive stone, Queens' Old Court was made using cheaper clunch with a red brick skin. Queens' was finished within two years, whereas King's Old Court was never finished, and the chapel took nearly a century to build.

The War Memorial Library is the present student library. The War Memorial Library was formerly the original chapel, part of Old Court. It was named in honour of Queens' College alumni and members who died in service in the Second World War. Before the 1940s, the student library was the present Old Library.

==== Old Library ====
The Old Library was built in 1448, part of Old Court, and situated between the President's Lodge and the original chapel. It is one of the earliest purpose-built libraries in Cambridge. It houses a collection of nearly 20,000 manuscripts and printed books. It is especially notable because nearly all printed books remain in their original bindings, because Queens' has never been wealthy enough to afford re-binding all the books in a uniform manner, as was the fashion in the 18th century. It is also notable because it contains the earliest English celestial globes, owned once by Queens' fellow of mathematics Sir Thomas Smith (1513–1577), and because its medieval lecterns were refashioned into bookshelves, still present today.

=== Walnut Tree Court ===
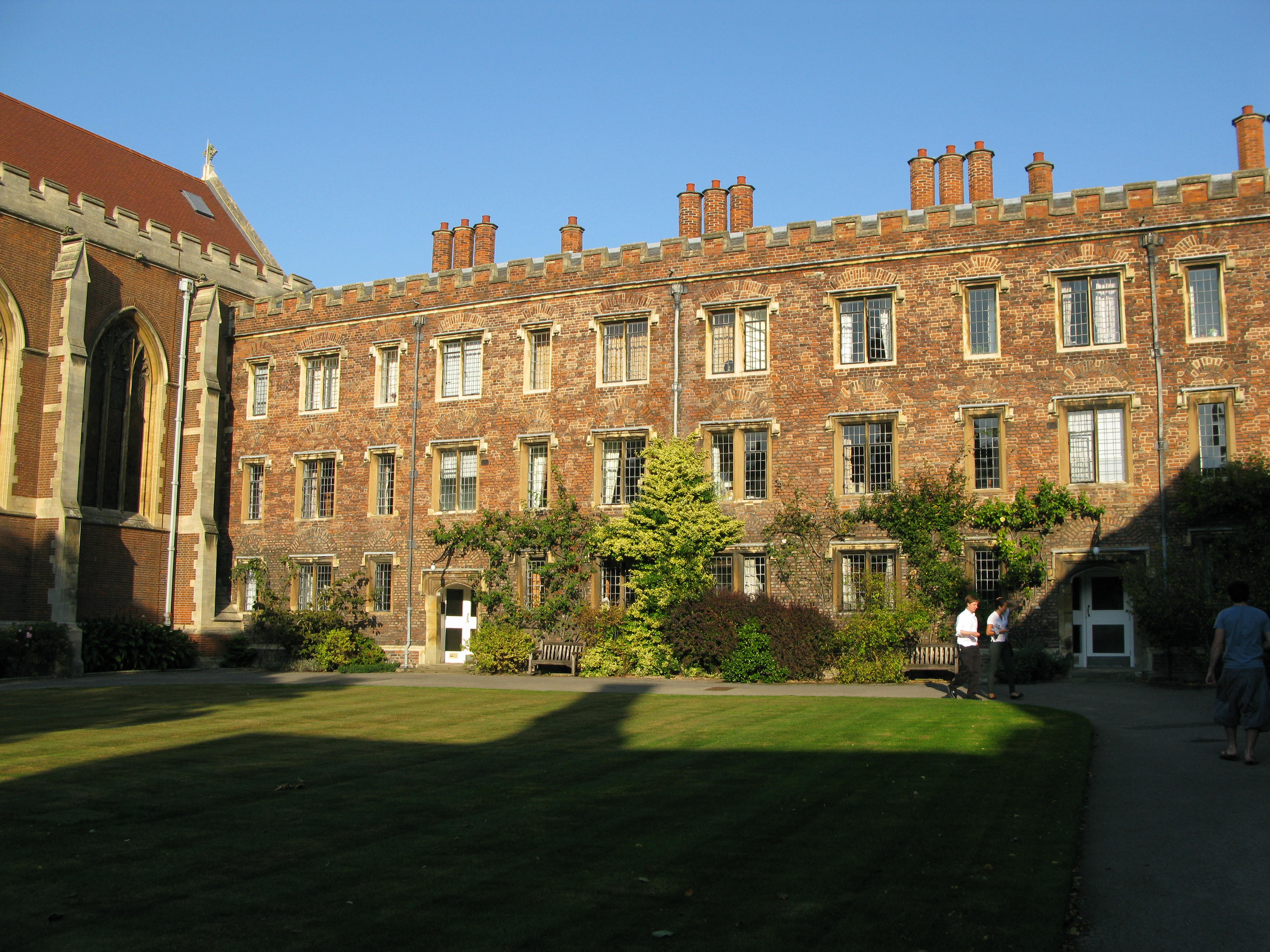
Walnut Tree Court

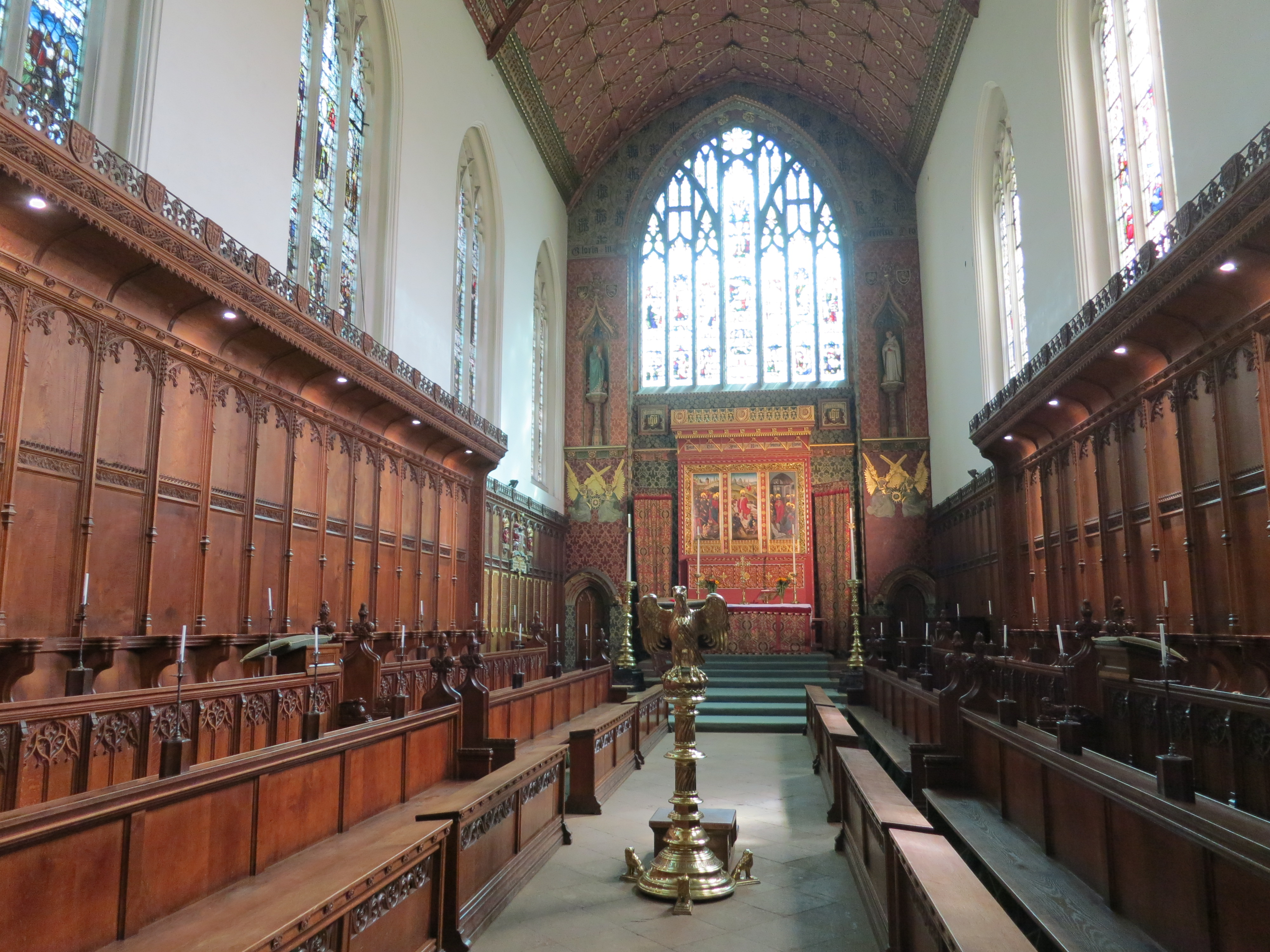
Queens' College Chapel

Walnut Tree Court was erected 1616–18. Walnut Tree Building on the east side of the court dates from around 1617 and was the work of the architects Gilbert Wragge and Henry Mason at a cost of £886.9s. Only the ground floor of the original construction remains after a fire in 1777, so it was rebuilt from the first floor upwards between 1778 and 1782, and battlements were added to it in 1823. This court was formerly the site of a Carmelite friary, Cambridge Whitefriars, founded in 1292, but is now the location of the college chapel and various fellows' and students' rooms. The walnut tree in the court stands on the line of a former wall of the friary, and was a replacement of an older one in the same position after which the court was named.

=== College Chapel ===
The college chapel in Walnut Tree Court was designed by George Frederick Bodley in 1886, built by Rattee and Kett and consecrated in 1891. It included new stained glass by C.E. Kempe. Today's chapel follows the traditional college chapel form of an aisle-less nave with rows of pews on either side, following the plan of monasteries, reflecting the origins of many colleges as a place for training priests for the ministry. The triptych of paintings on the altarpiece panel are late-15th-century Netherlandish, and are attributed to the 'Master of the View of Saint Gudula'. They depict, from left to right, the Agony in the Garden of Gethsemane, the Resurrection of Jesus and Christ's Appearance to the Disciples and may originally have been part of a set of five paintings.

=== Friar's Court ===
The college experienced a growth in student numbers during the 19th century, bringing with it the need for additional student accommodation. The President's second garden was taken as the site for new student accommodation called Friars' Building, designed by W. M. Fawcett and built in 1886. The building, named after the Cambridge Whitefriars, accommodates 52 students and fellows.

Friars' Building is flanked to the East by the Dokett Building. Dokett Building was designed by Cecil Greenwood Hare and built in 1912 from thin red Daneshill brick with Corsham stone dressings and mullioned windows. It stands on the former site of almshouses which were maintained by benefaction from a former President of the college Andrew Dokett. The almshouses were demolished in 1911 to make way for the new building. On demolition of the almshouses, a fund was made available for payment of pensions – always to eight women — in accordance with the will of Dokett. In 2014, Dokett Building underwent major restorations, with the majority of the bricks in the building being replaced and the rooms being reconfigured. In 2019, railings were restored to the Queens' Lane elevation of Dokett Building. These railings were based on the original design of the railings outside Dokett Building in 1912, but at a lowered height to preserve sightlines from groundfloor windows. This building is largely occupied by second and third years, along with some fellows.

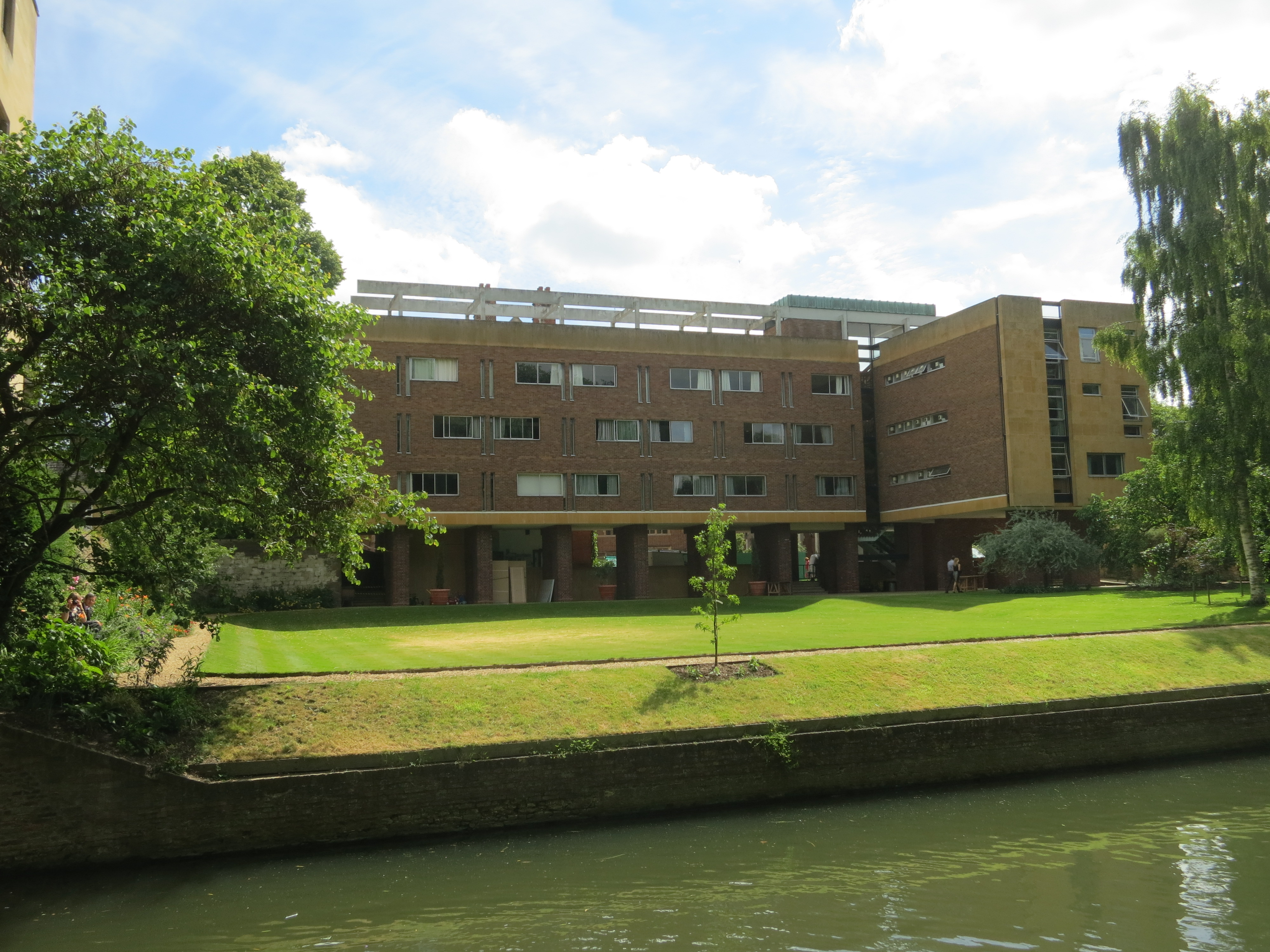
Erasmus Building, as seen from The Grove

The Erasmus Building completes Friar's Court on the West. It was designed by Sir Basil Spence and erected in 1959, and is notable for being the first college building on the Backs to be designed in the Modernist tradition. The modern design of the building generated some controversy and the project encountered strong resistance at the time. It was officially opened by the Queen Mother in June 1961. The lawn in front includes a crown bowling green laid out in the 16th century.

=== Cripps Court ===
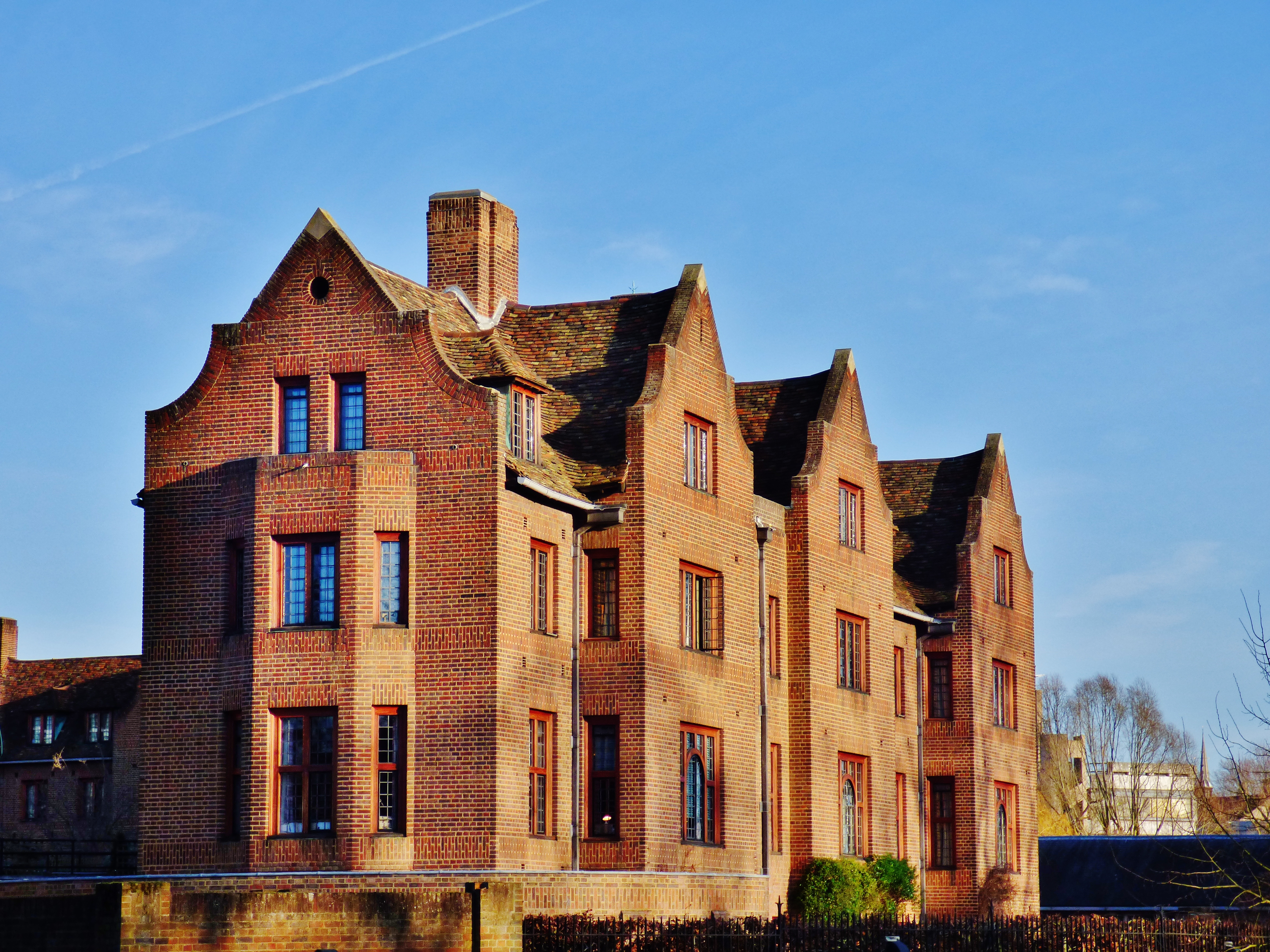
The Fisher Building viewed from Queens' Green

Cripps Court, incorporating Lyon Court (named after the Queen Mother), was designed by Sir Philip Powell of Powell & Moya and built in stages between 1972 and 1988. It was described by Stephen Gardiner as "easily the best piece of modern architecture by a British architect anywhere." In brutalist style it houses a bar and gymnasium with squash courts, 171 student bedrooms, three fellows' flats, a solarium, dining hall and kitchens, various function rooms, a large multipurpose auditorium (The Fitzpatrick Hall) and three combination rooms (Junior for undergraduate students, Middle for postgraduates, and Senior for fellows). It was the benefaction of the Cripps Foundation and the largest building erected by the college. A fourth floor was added in 2007, providing student accommodation and fellows' offices.

=== Fisher Building ===
Named after St John Fisher, this was erected in 1936 and designed by G. C. Drinkwater. It continued the Queens' tradition of red brick. The window frames are of teak, and all internal woodwork is oak. It was the first student accommodation in Queens' to lie west of the river and was the first building in Queens' to have bathrooms and toilets on the staircase landings close to the student rooms. These were so obvious that it prompted the comment that the building "seemed to have been designed by a sanitary engineer".

=== The Mathematical Bridge ===
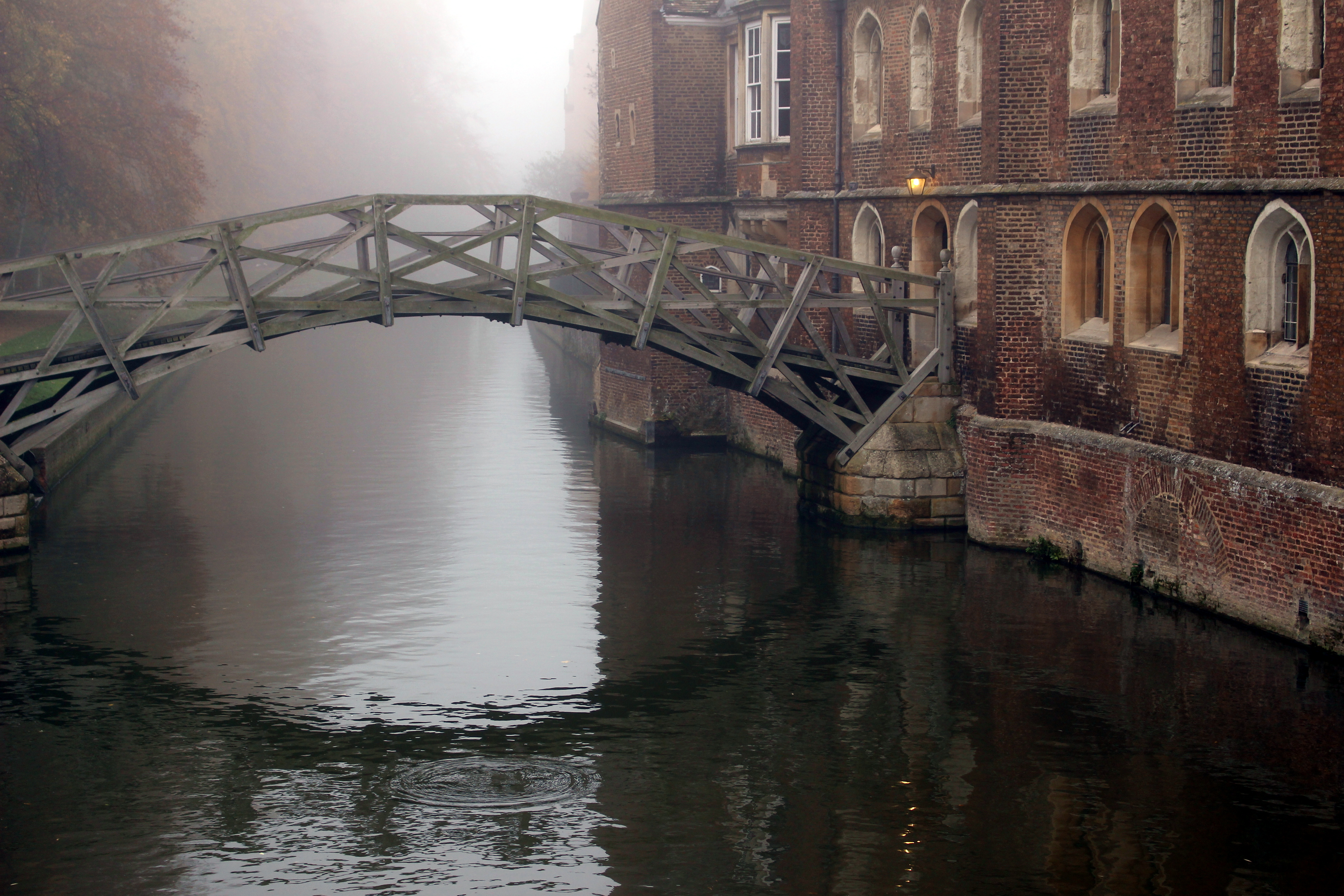
The Mathematical Bridge

The Mathematical Bridge (officially named the Wooden Bridge) crosses the River Cam and connects the older half of the college (affectionately referred to by students as the "dark side") with the newer western half (the "light side", officially known as "The Island"). It is part of one of the most photographed views in Cambridge, the typical photo being taken from the nearby Silver Street Bridge.

Popular fable has it that the bridge was designed and built by Sir Isaac Newton without the use of nuts or bolts, and at some point in the past students or fellows attempted to take the bridge apart and put it back together. The myth continues that the over-ambitious engineers were unable to match Newton's feat of engineering, and had to resort to fastening the bridge by nuts and bolts. That, purportedly, is why nuts and bolts can be seen in the bridge today. This story is false: the bridge was built of oak in 1749 by James Essex the Younger (1722–1784) to the design of the master carpenter William Etheridge (1709–1776), 22 years after Newton died.

The bridge was repaired in 1866 due to decay, and had to be completely rebuilt in 1905. The rebuild was to the same design but made from teak, and the stepped walkway was made sloped for improved wheelchair access. A handrail was added on one side to help the Queen Mother cross the bridge on her visits to the college. The boltheads are more visible in the post-1905 bridge, which may have given rise to the failed reassembly myth.

=== Gallery ===
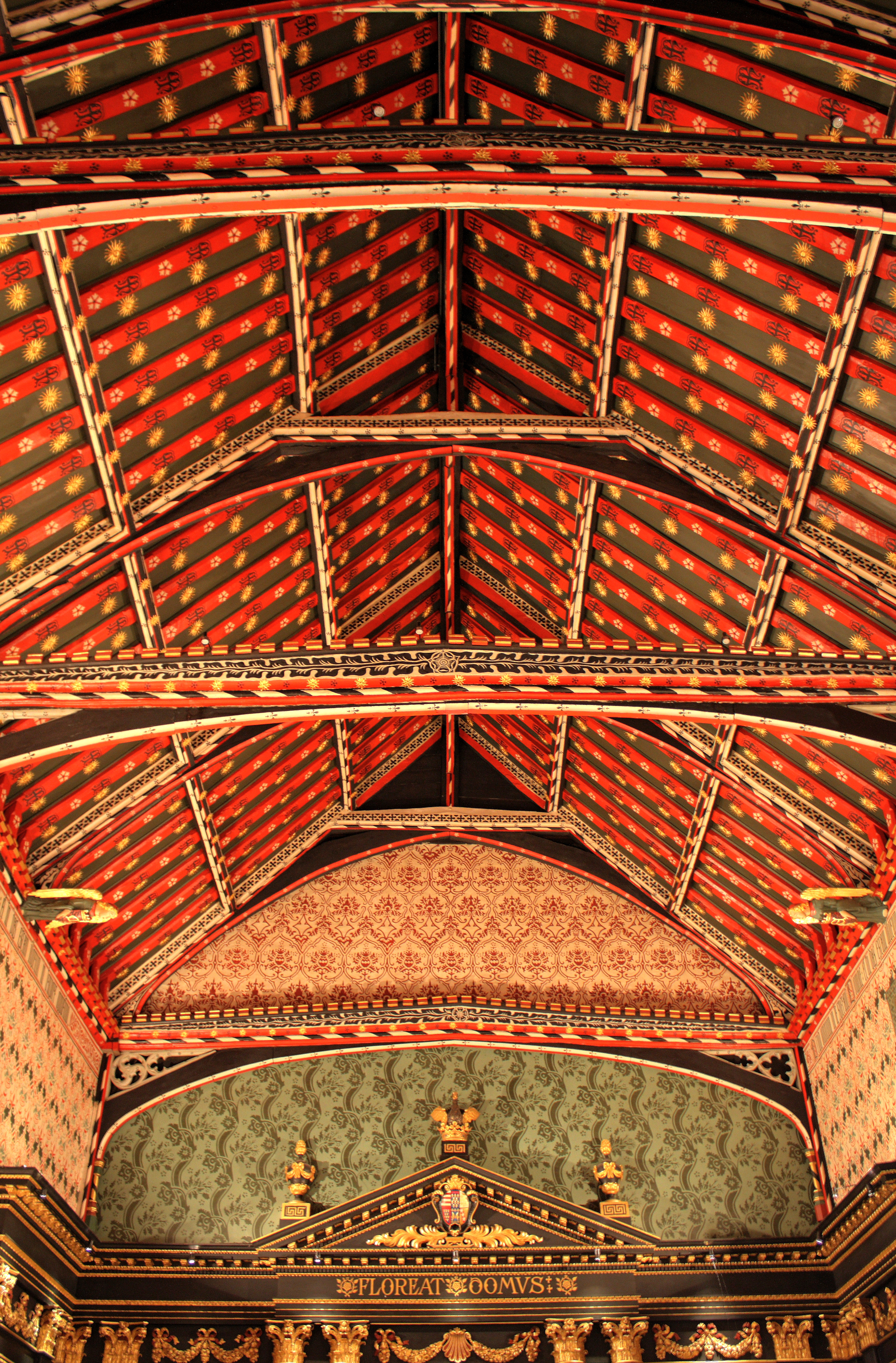
Ceiling of the old hall

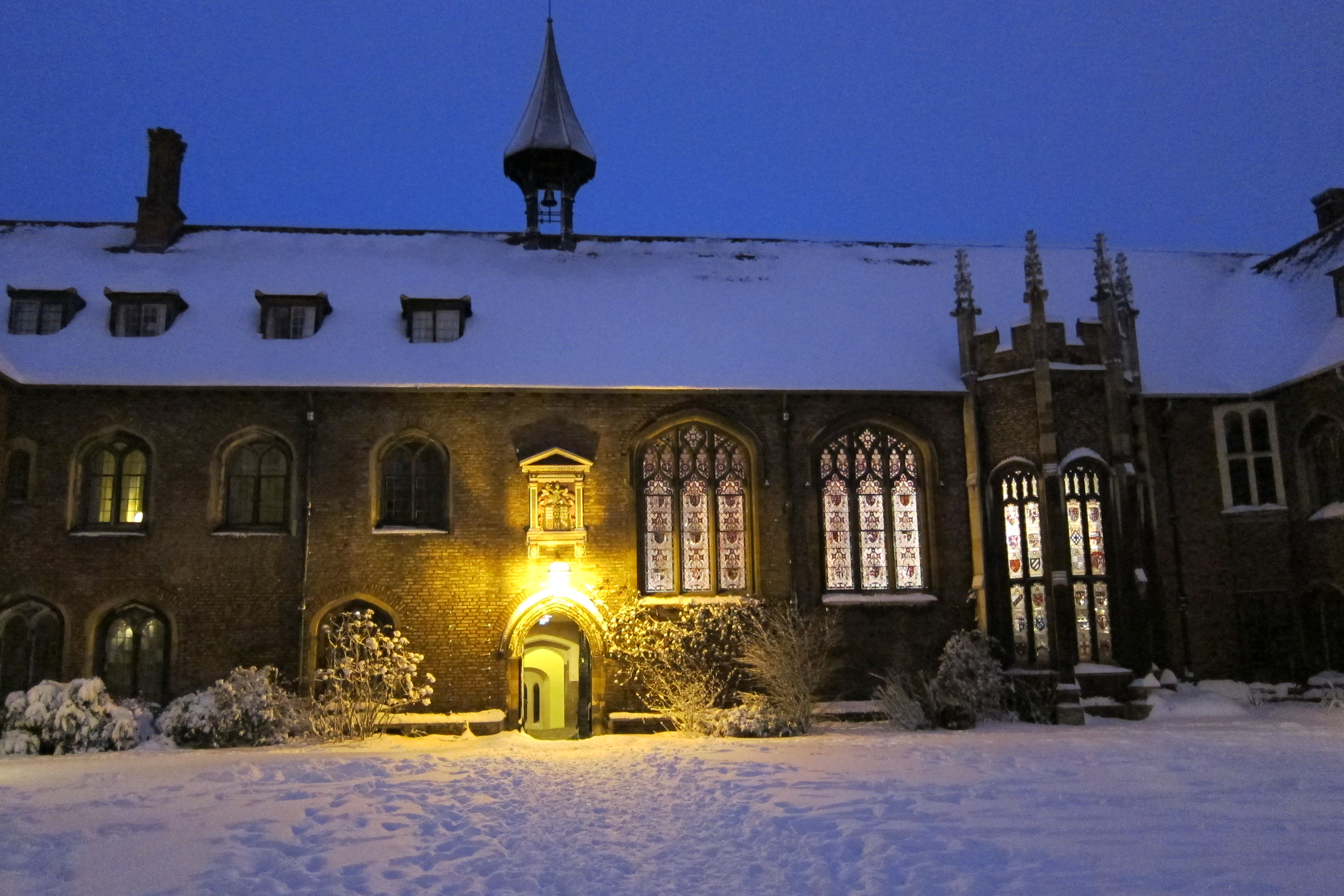
Old Court in the snow

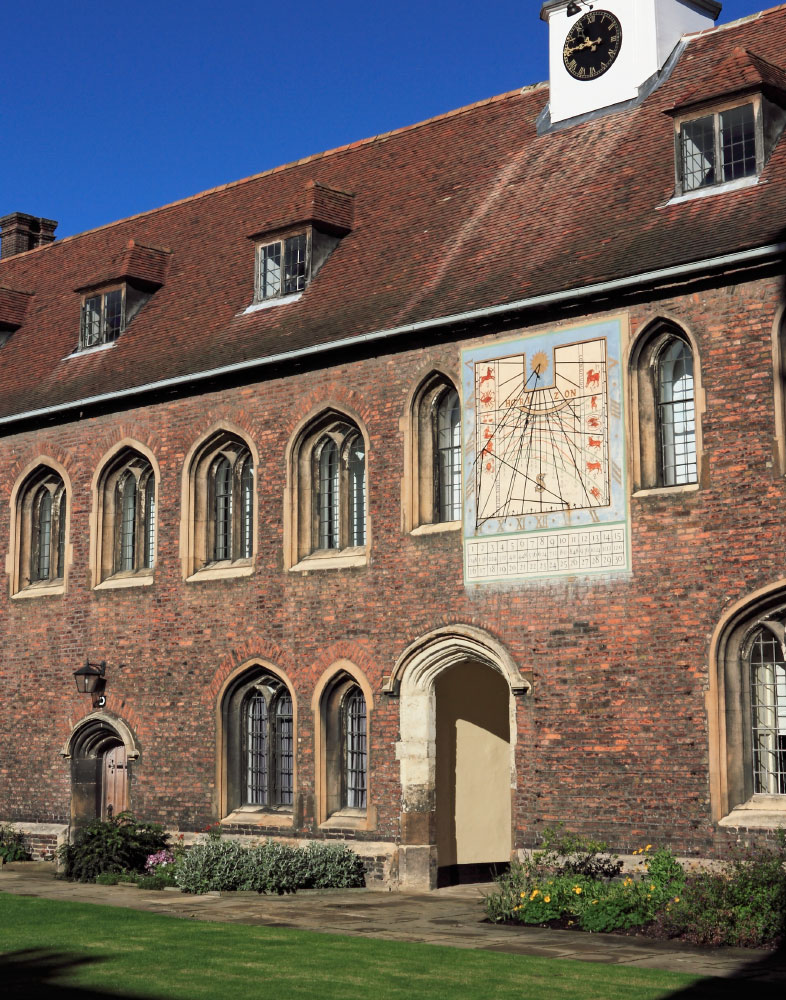
Sundial in Old Court

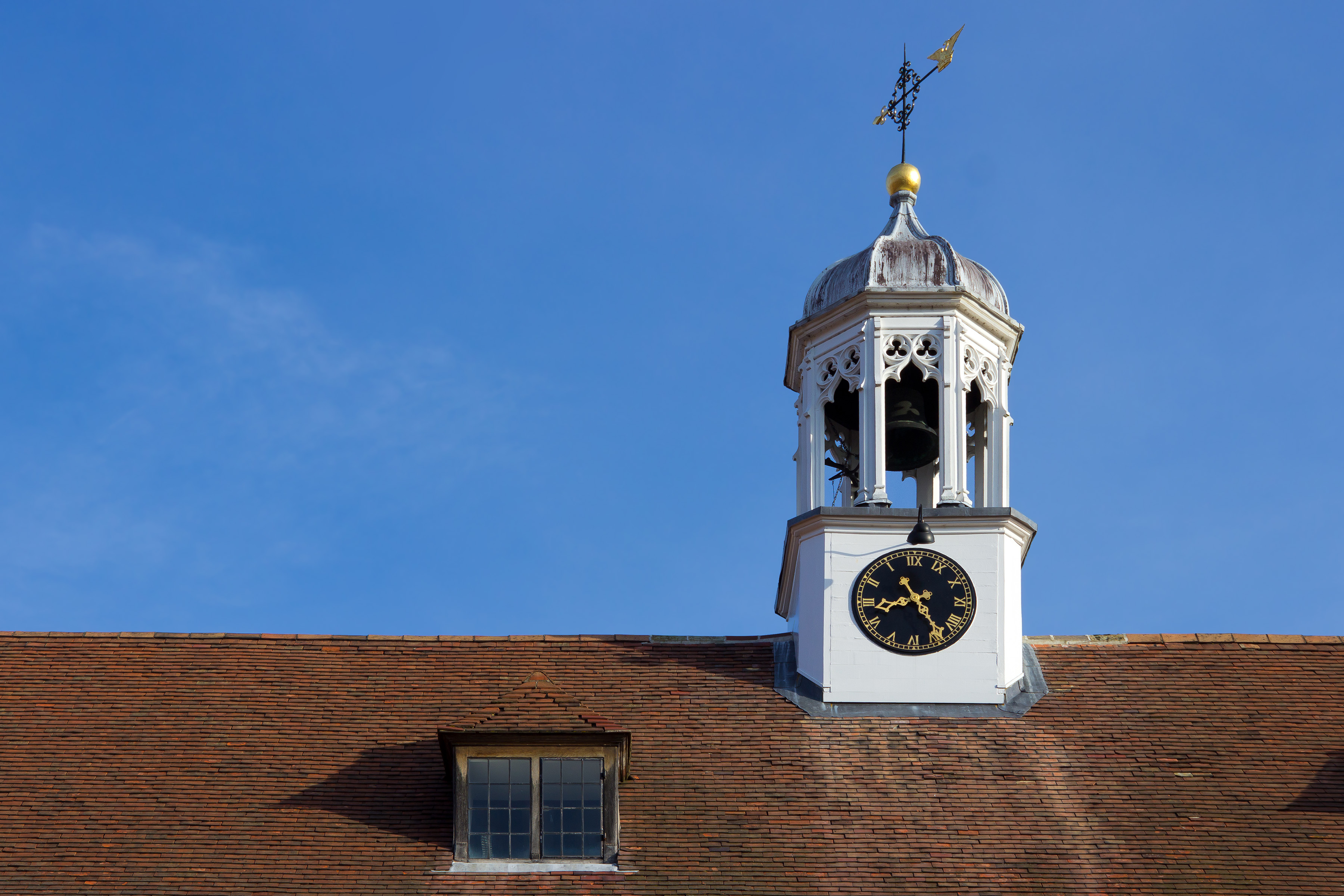
Bell tower and clock above the War Memorial Library

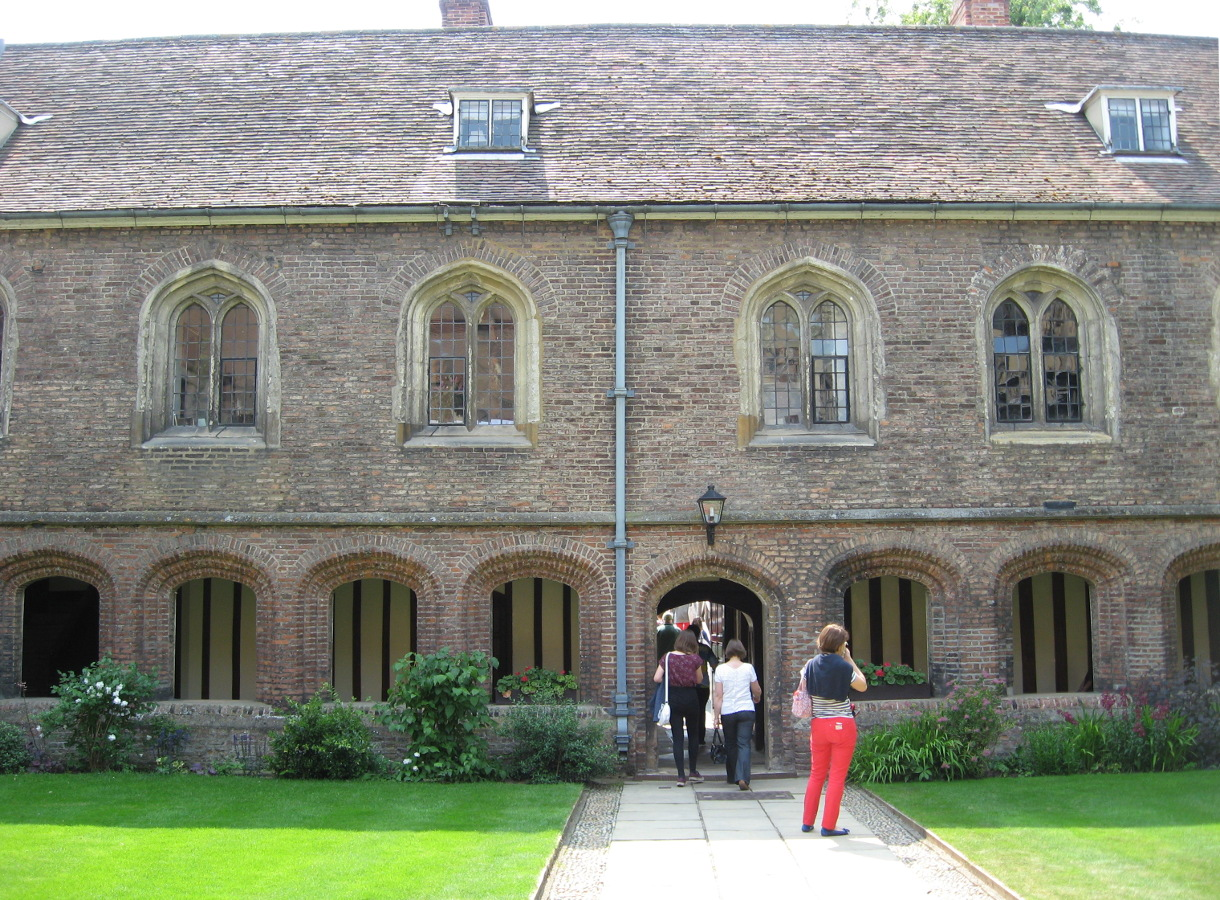
Cloister Court

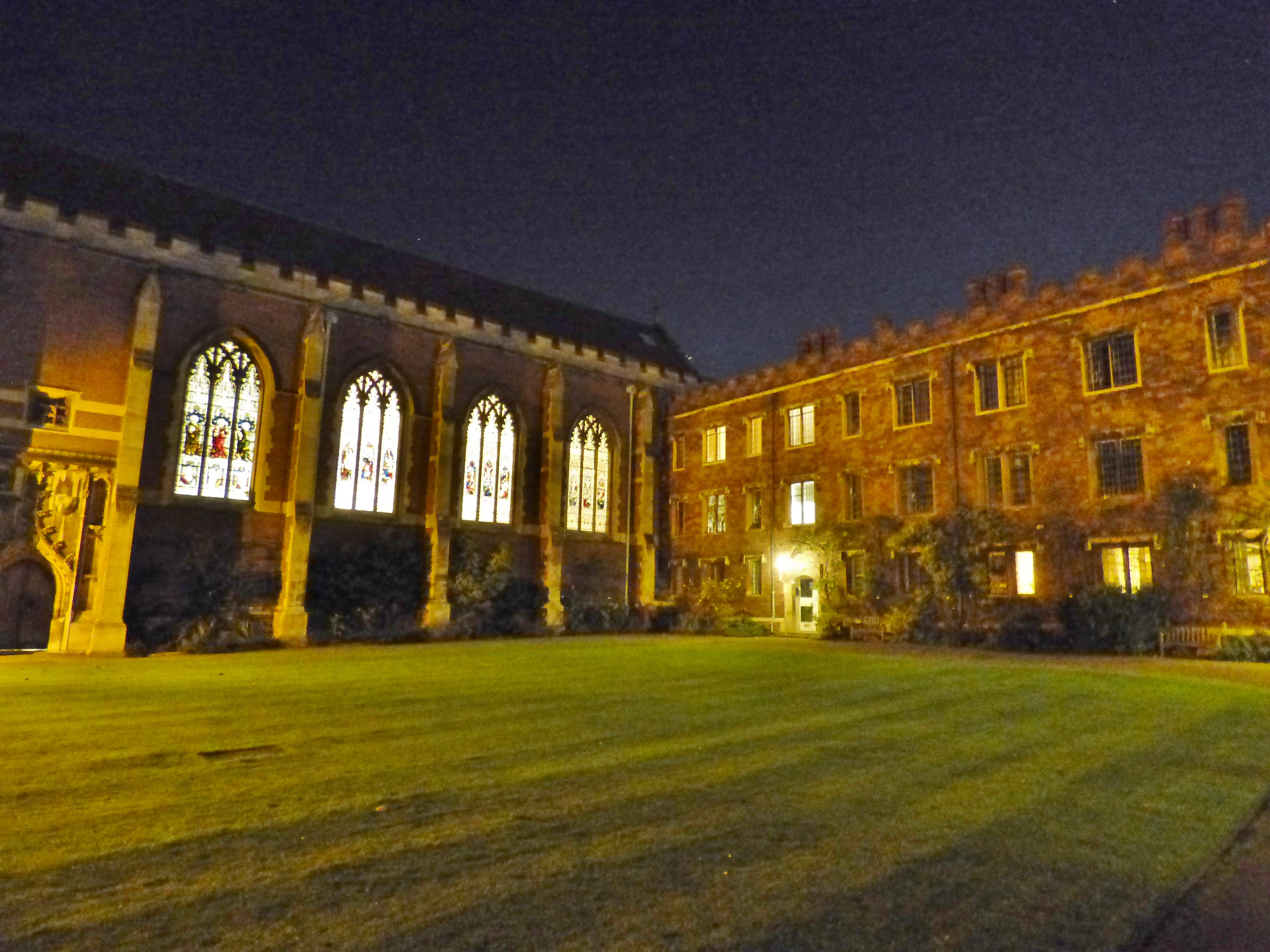
Chapel and Walnut Tree Court

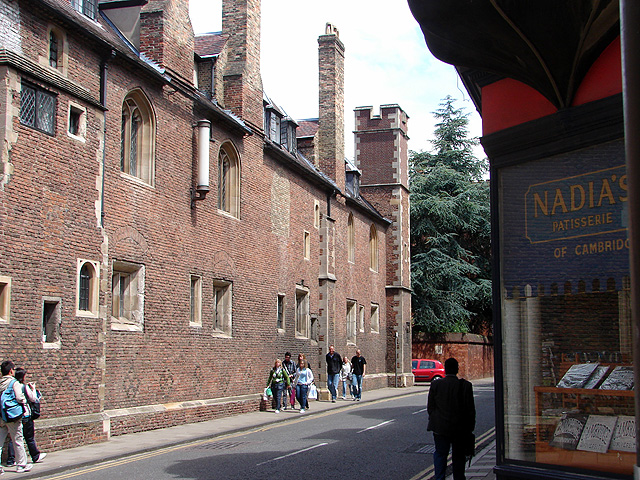
Silver Street with Queens' on the left

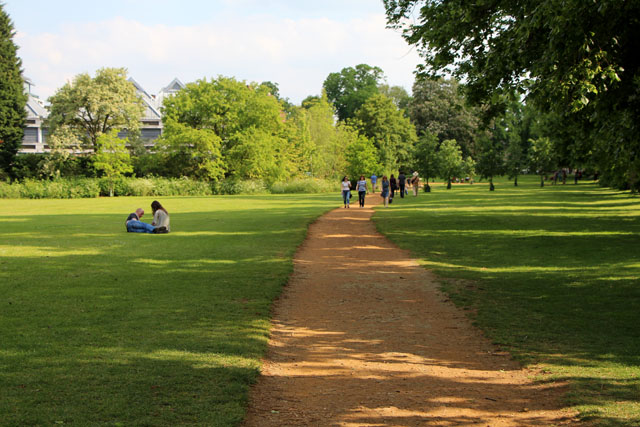
Queens' Green

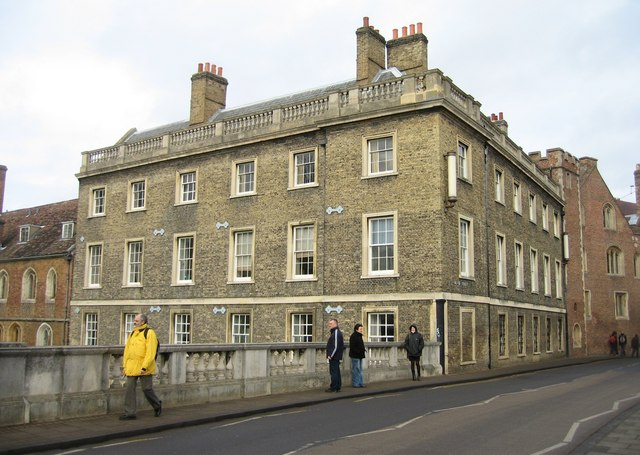
Essex Building as viewed from Silver Street

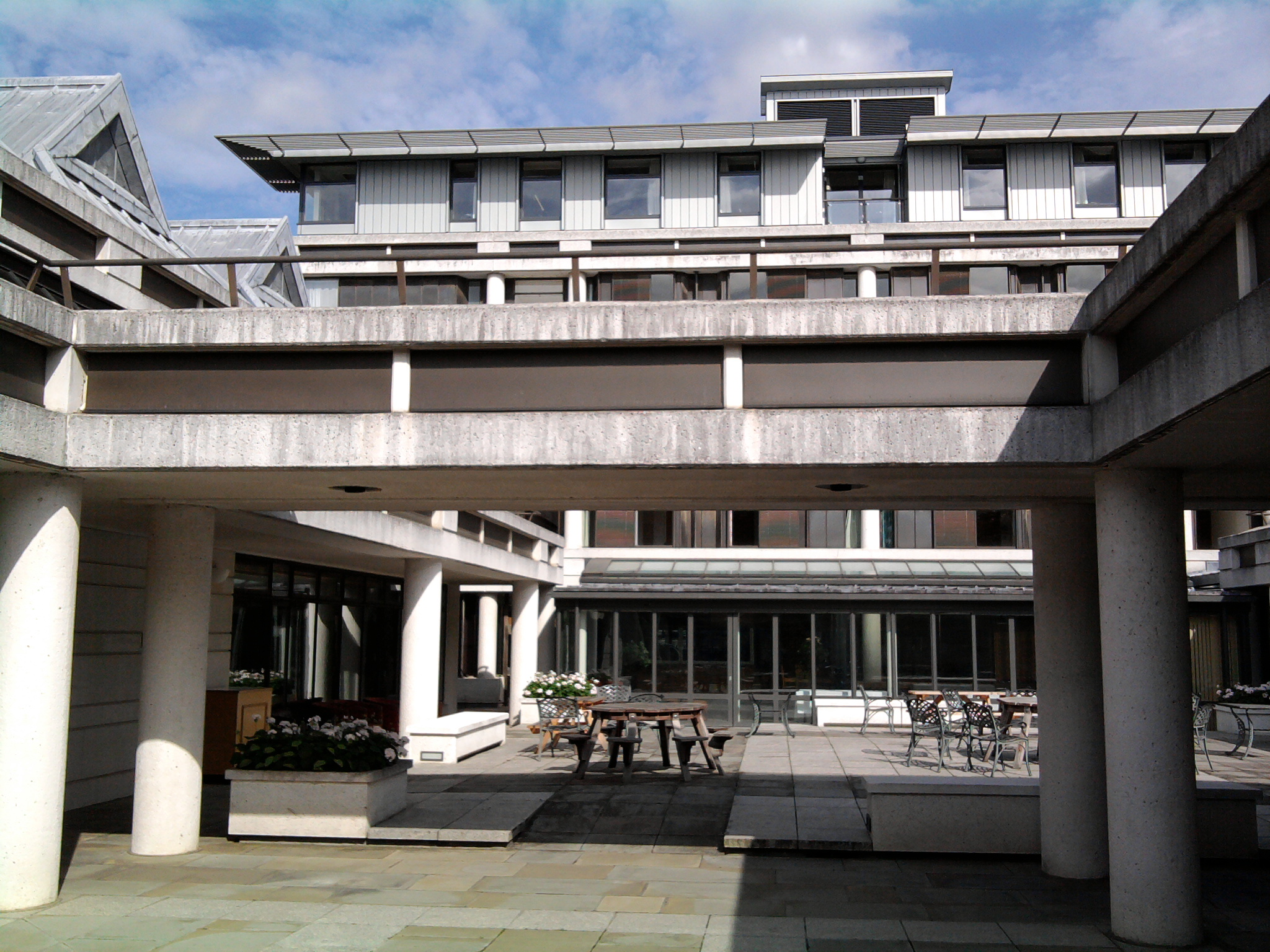
Lyon Court

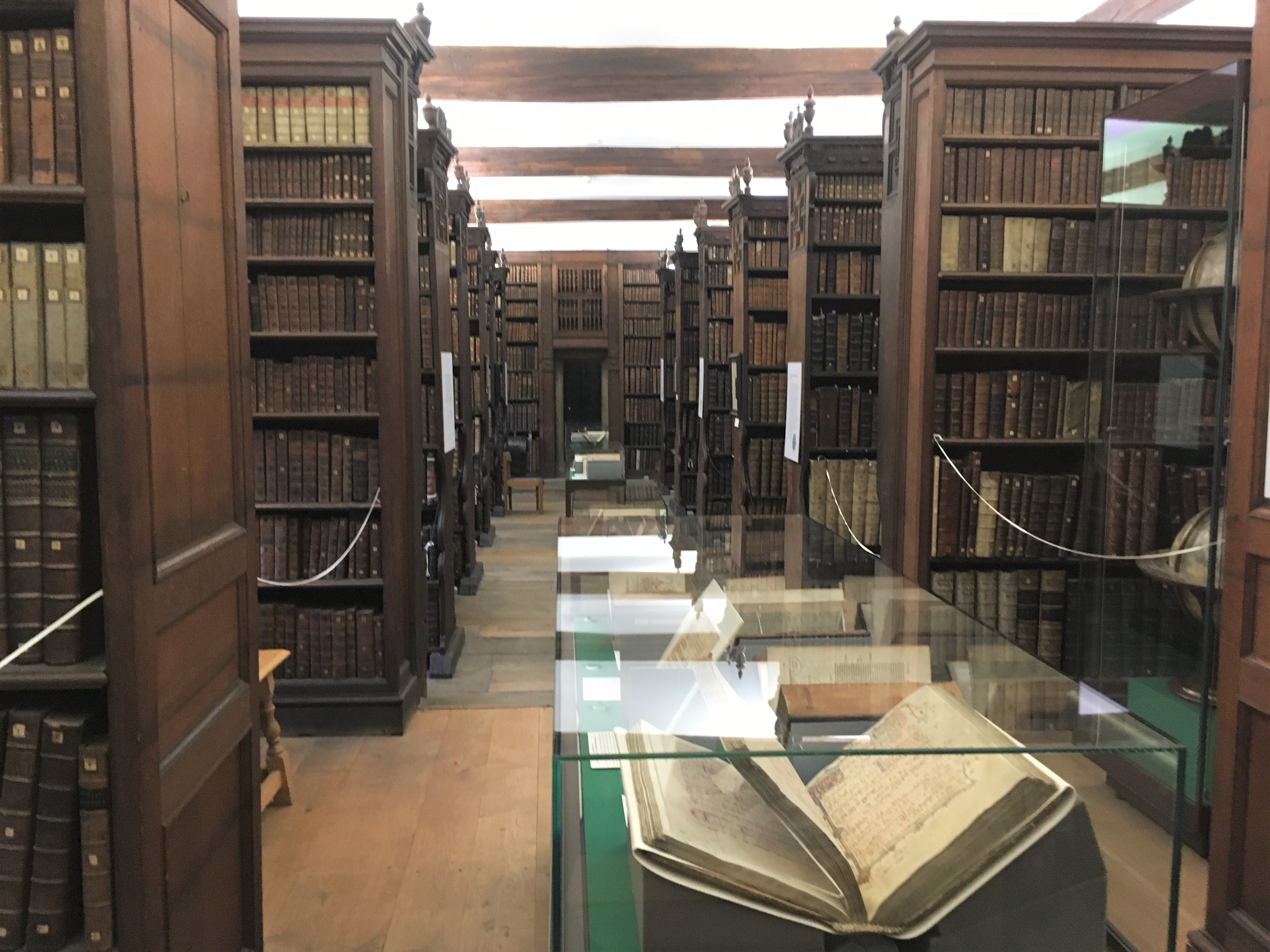
The Old Library

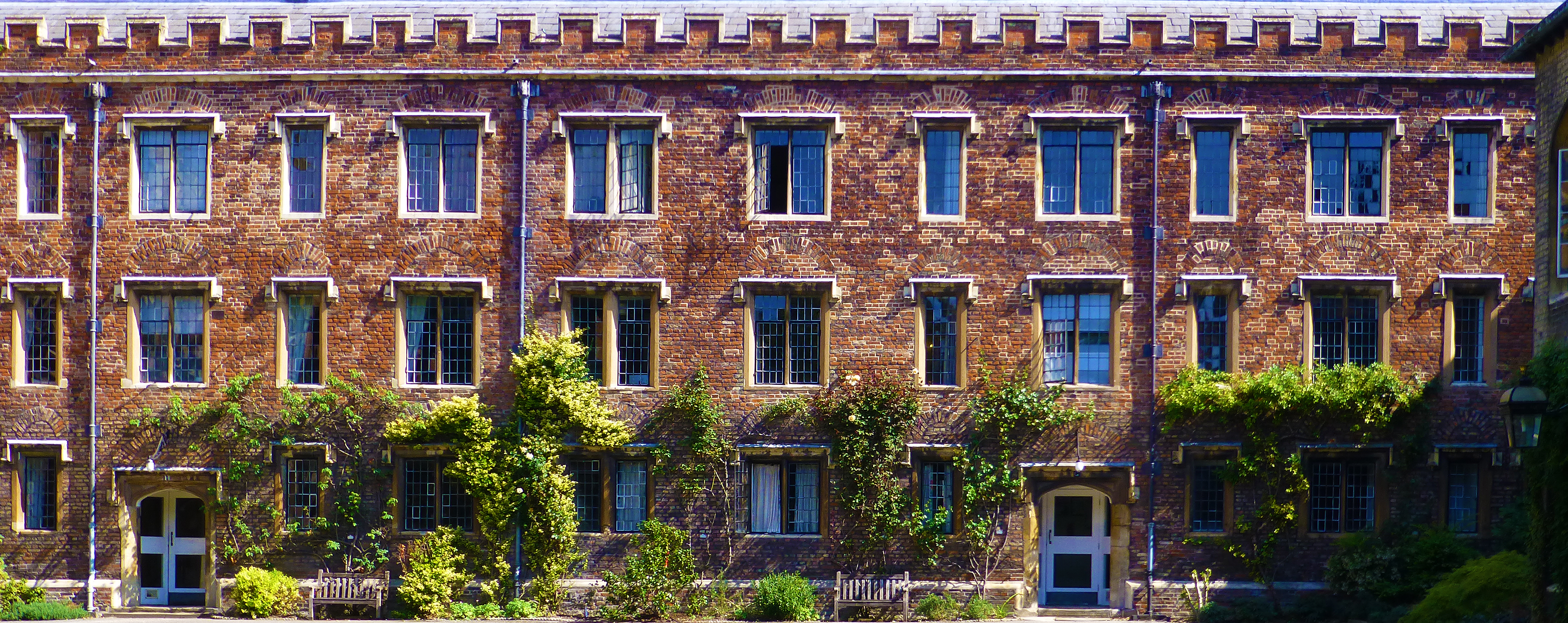
Walnut Tree Building, erected 1616–19

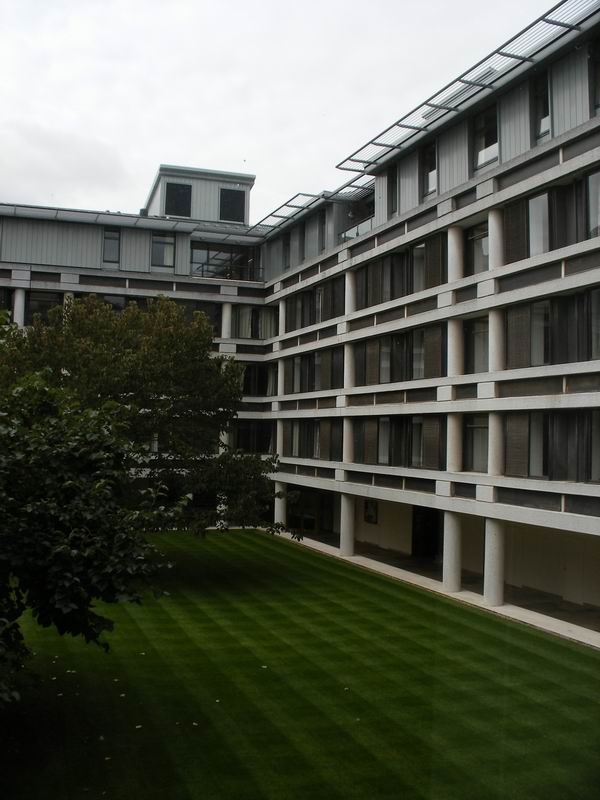
Cripps Court

== Academic profile ==
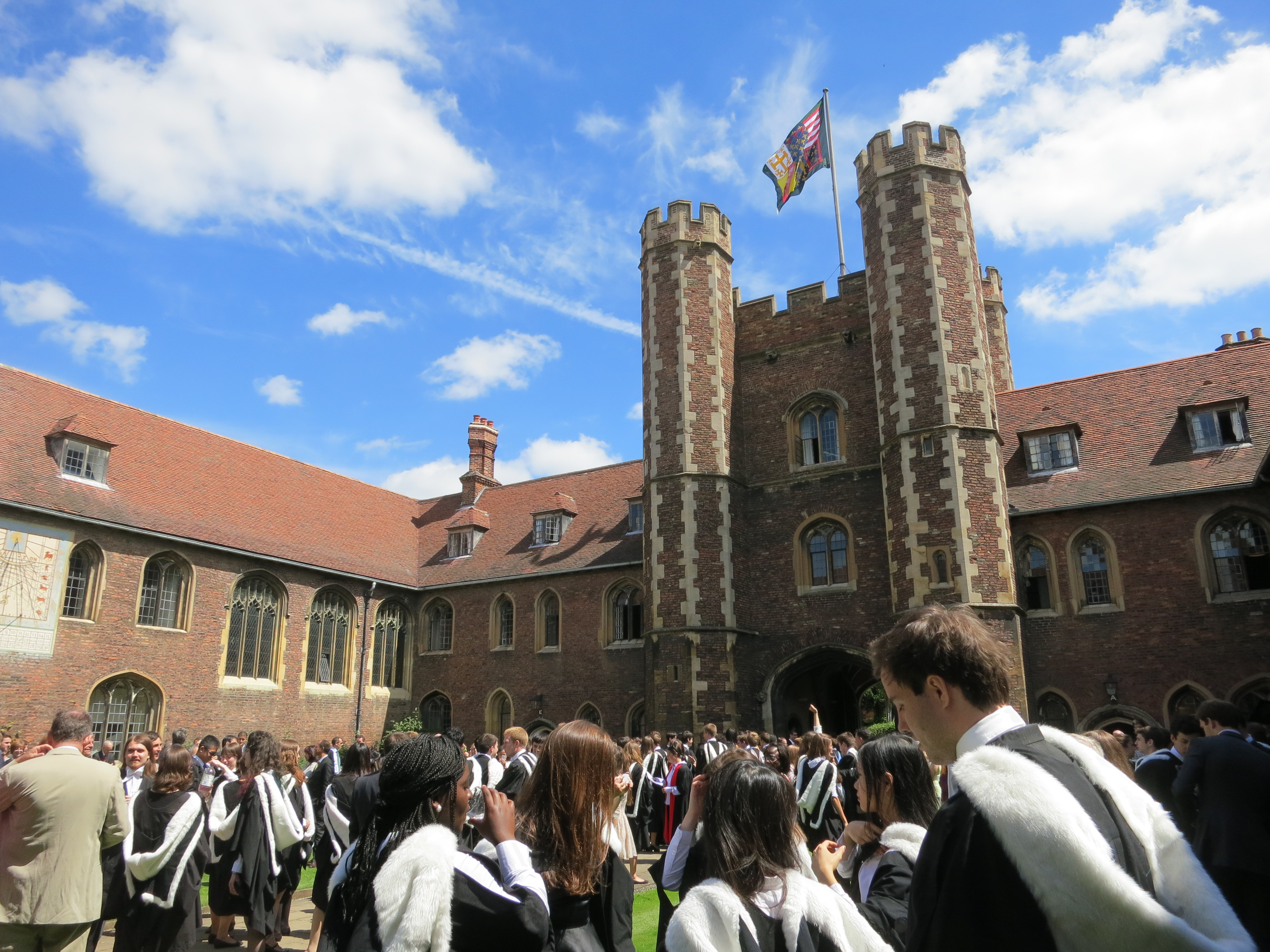
Graduation Day

Queens' College accepts students from all academic disciplines. As in other Cambridge colleges, all candidates go through an interview process. Undergraduate applicants for some courses are required to take an admission test in advance. For example, from 2022, applicants in economics are expected to have taken the Test of Mathematics for University Admission before they can be admitted.

Like all other Cambridge colleges, undergraduate education is based on the tutorial system. Most undergraduate supervisions are carried out in the college, though for some specialist subjects undergraduates may be sent to supervisors in other colleges. The faculty and academic supervisors associated with the colleges play a very important part in the academic success of students. The college maintains strong ties with Cambridge Judge Business School and has a growing graduate community, including a lively mix of doctoral, medical and PGCE students. The college also maintains an extensive library, which supplements the university libraries.

In 2021, Queens' ranked sixth in the Tompkins Table, which ranks the 29 undergraduate Cambridge colleges according to the academic performance of their undergraduates. Its highest position was second, and its average position was fifth. In 2022, the proportion of Firsts was 31.5%.

== Student life ==
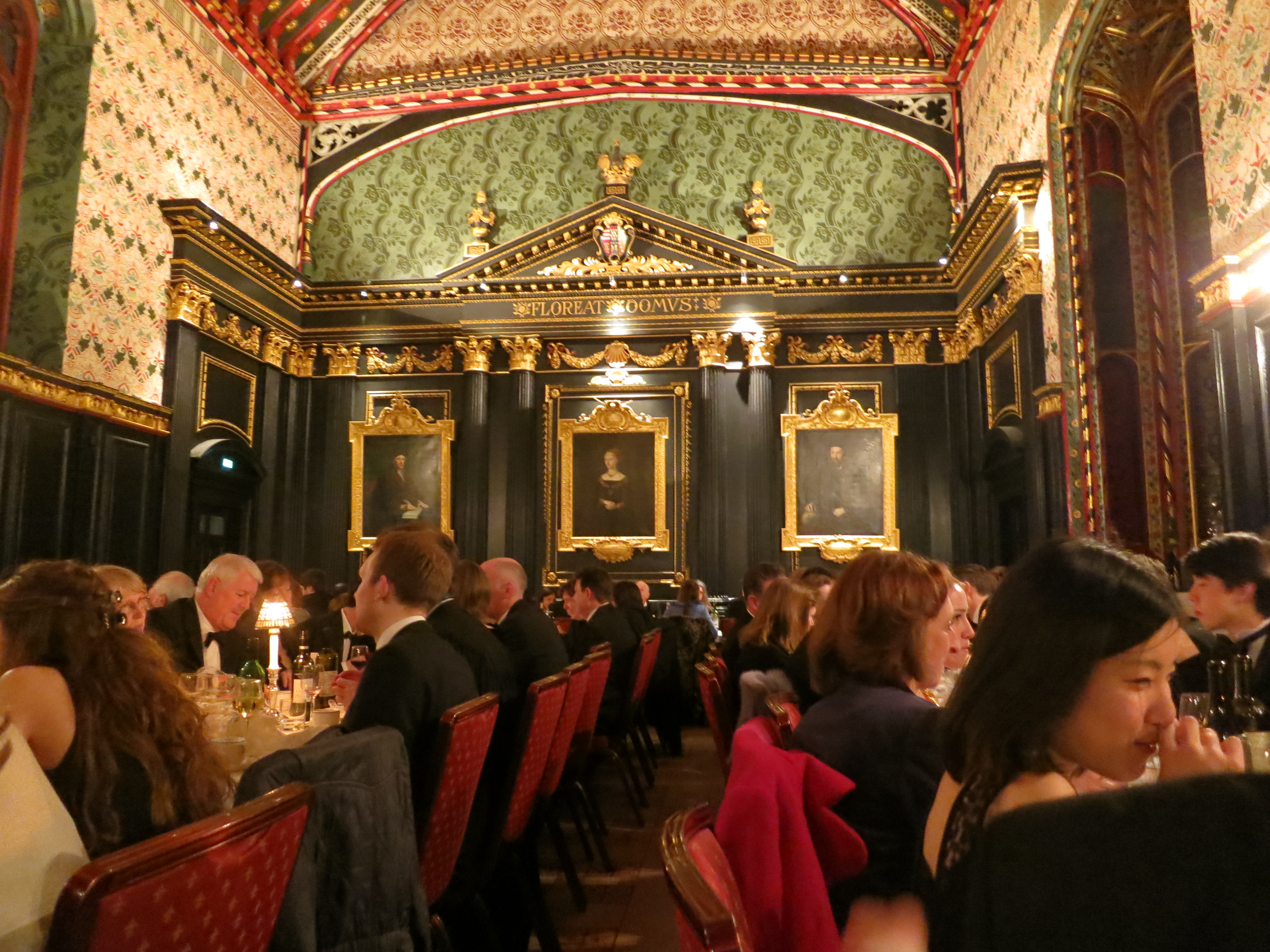
The Old Hall, decorated by Morris, Marshall, Faulkner & Co. in the 1860s, as seen in 2014

The buildings of Queens' College include the chapel, the hall, two libraries, a bar, and common rooms for fellows, graduates and undergraduates. There are also extensive gardens, lawns, a sports ground and boat house. The college also owns its own punts which may be borrowed by students, fellows and staff.

College accommodation is provided for all undergraduate and many graduate students, with the majority of undergraduate accommodation being on the main college site. All other students usually live in the college residence, Owlstone Croft, located in Newnham village, a fifteen-minute walk from the central site. The college also owns several houses and flats in Cambridge, which are usually occupied by doctoral students and married couples. Members of the college can choose to dine either in the hall, where three-course meals are served and members must wear academic gowns, or in the buttery, where food can be purchased from a cafeteria-style buffet.

Despite being an ancient college, Queens' is known as among the more open and relaxed Cambridge colleges. The college provides facilities to support most sports and arts. Queens' has active student societies, known as the Junior Combination Room and the Middle Combination Room, which represent the students and organise various activities for undergraduate and graduate students respectively. There are a variety of clubs ranging from wine tasting and amateur dramatics to the Queens' College Boat Club.

Queens' has a strong reputation for music and drama, with the Fitzpatrick Hall providing theatre and concert space for students and societies from across the university.

=== Sports ===
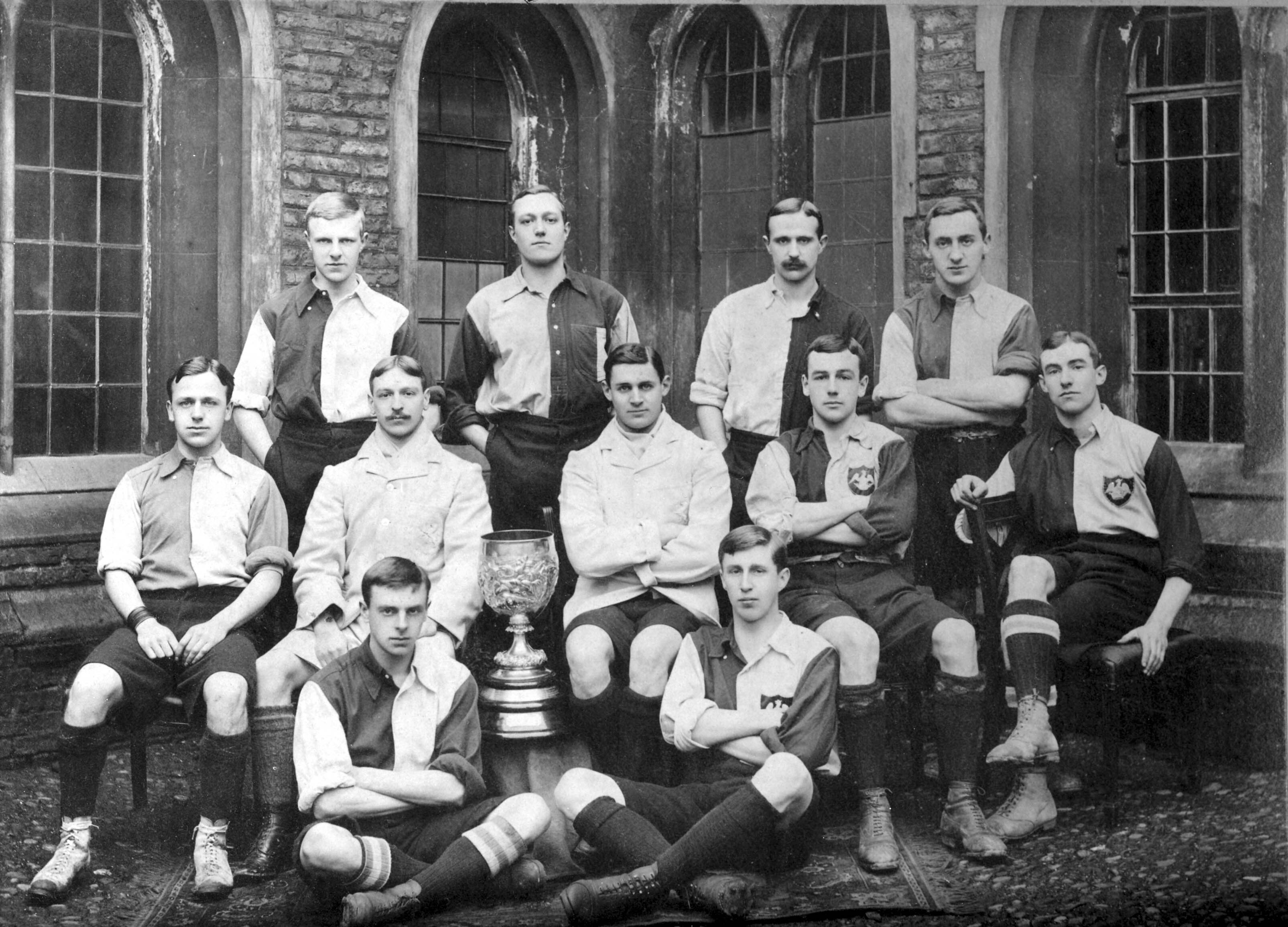
Queens' College Cambridge football team 1900–1901, including Sir Shenton Thomas, Charles Tate Regan and Samuel Day.

The college has sports grounds, a boat-house, squash courts and gym. The college rowing club, Queens' College Boat Club, is one of the oldest in the university with the earliest known record of the college boat club dates from 1831. The club's boathouse was built in 1986 and is shared with Magdalene College Boat Club. Like other Cambridge boat clubs it takes part in a number of annual rowing races on the River Cam, Lent Bumps and May Bumps.

Queens' College Rugby Football Club (QCRFC), plays Rugby Union against other Cambridge colleges in both league and knock-out competitions. The rugby club has produced several notable alumni including Irish international star Mike Gibson, former England captain John Spencer, Barry Holmes, Charles Nicholl and Jamie Roberts.

The college football club, QCAFC, part of the Cambridge University Association Football League (CUAFL), won the Cuppers knockout cup competition in 2010–11 and jointly won in 2019–20. Queens' won the CUAFL Premier League title in 2017–18 season. Queens' is also traditionally strong in cricket, with QCCC playing their home games on the cricket ground in the Barton Road playing fields.

=== May Ball ===
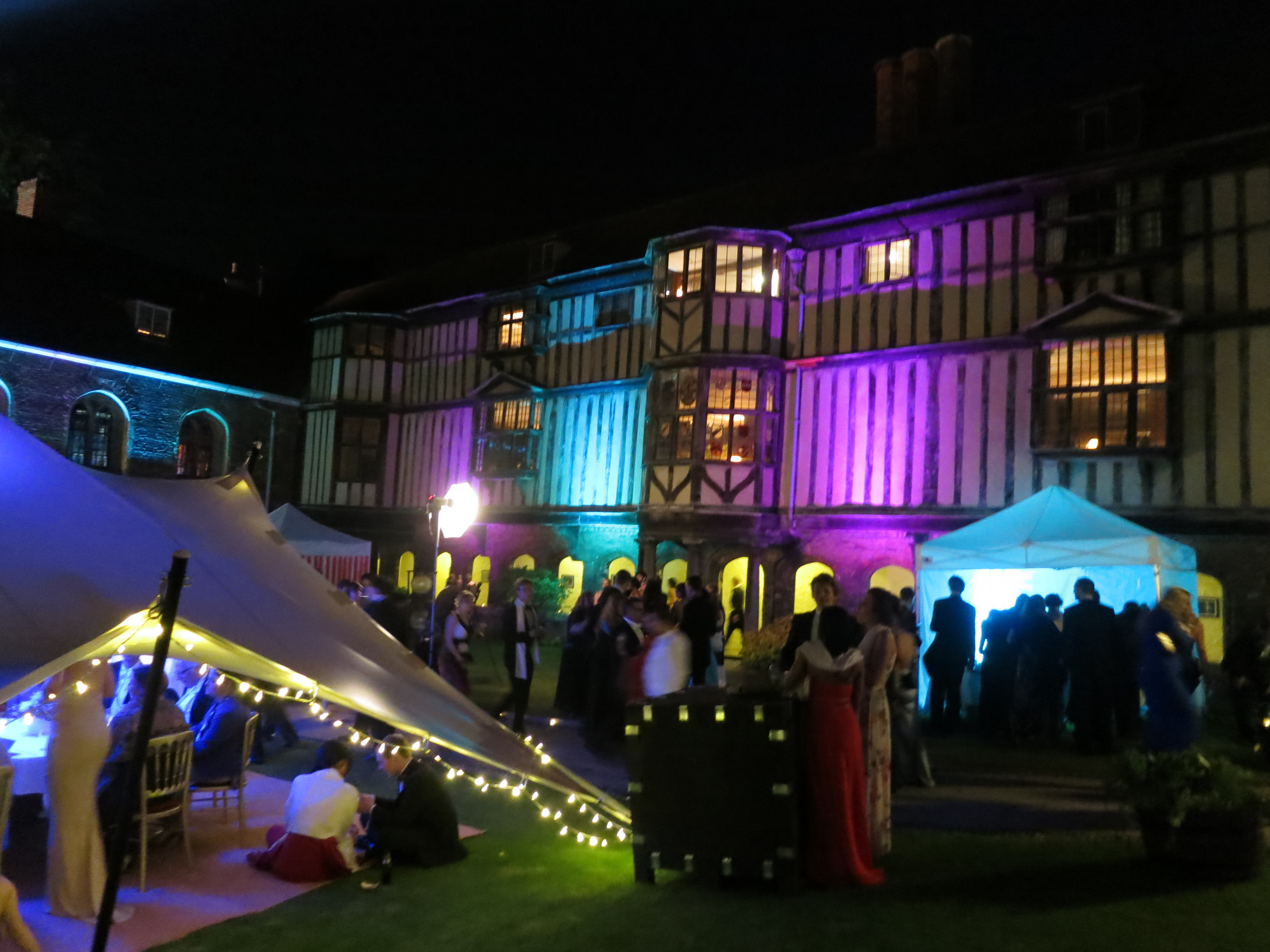
Cloister Court lit up during the 2013 Queens' May Ball

The college hosts a May Ball every two years. In recent years, due to popularity, tickets have been available only to Queens' members and their guests. Highlights include an extravagant fireworks display and a variety of musical acts; Florence and the Machine, Bombay Bicycle Club, Kaiser Chiefs, Alex Clare, JP Cooper, and Klaxons have played at the event. 2013 marked the centenary of Queens' May Ball, the event was white tie and the entertainment included Bastille.

== Traditions ==
=== College grace ===
The college grace is customarily said before and after dinner in the hall. The reading of grace before dinner (ante prandium) is usually the duty of a scholar of the college; grace after dinner (post prandium) is said by the President or the senior fellow dining. The grace is said shortly after the fellows enter the hall, signalled by the sounding of a gong. The Ante Prandium is read after the fellows have entered, the Post Prandium after they have finished dining. However, the last grace is almost never used. A simpler English after-dinner grace is now said:

For these and all his mercies, for the queens our foundresses and for our other benefactors, God's holy name be blessed and praised. God preserve our King and Church.

Grace	Latin	English
Ante Prandium (Before Dinner)	Benedic, Domine, nos et dona tua, quae de largitate tua sumus sumpturi, et concede, ut illis salubriter nutriti tibi debitum obsequium praestare valeamus, per Christum Dominum nostrum.	Bless, O Lord, us and your gifts, which from your bounty we are about to receive, and grant that, healthily nourished by them, we may render you due obedience, through Christ our Lord.
Post Prandium (After Dinner)	Gratias tibi agimus, sempiterne Deus, quod tam benigne hoc tempore nos pascere dignatus es, benedicentes sanctum nomen tuum pro reginis, fundatricibus nostris caeterisque benefactoribus, quorum beneficiis hic ad pietatem et studia literarum alimur, petimusque ut nos, his donis ad tuam gloriam recte utentes, una cum illis qui in fide Christi decesserunt, ad coelestem vitam perducamur, per Christum Dominum nostrum. Deus, salvam fac Regem atque Ecclesiam.	We give you thanks, eternal God, that so kindly at this time you have deigned to feed us, blessing your holy name for the queens, our foundresses, and our other benefactors, by whose benefits we are nourished here towards piety and the study of letters, and we ask that we, rightly using these gifts for your glory, together with those who have died in the faith of Christ, may be brought to the life in heaven, through Christ our Lord. God preserve the King and Church.

=== College rivalry ===
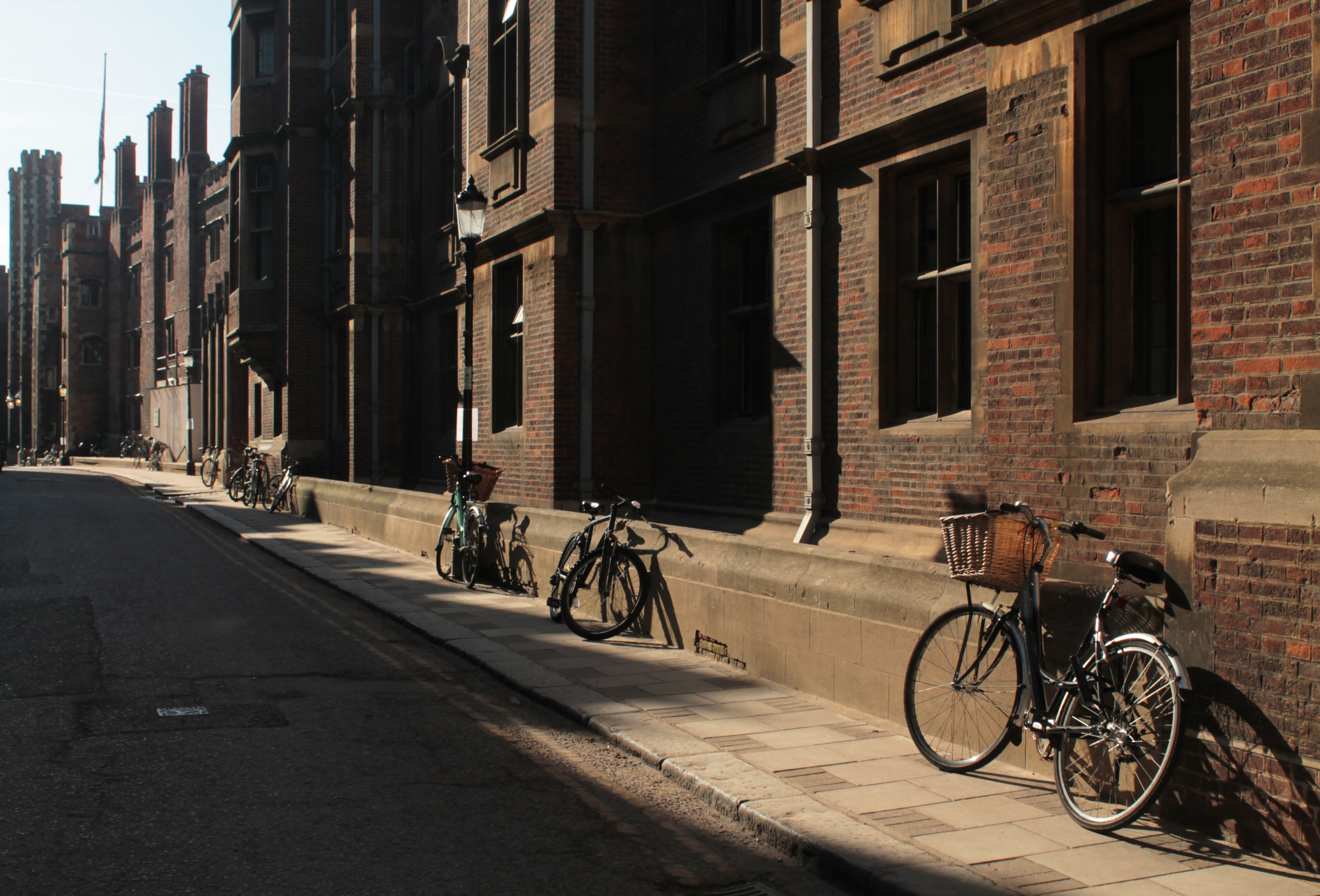
Queens' Lane

The college maintains a friendly rivalry with St Catharine's College after the construction of the main court of St Catharine's College on Cambridge's former High Street relegated one side of Queens' College into a back alley.

=== College stamps ===
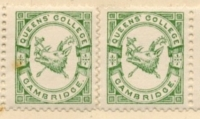
Queens' College stamps

Queens' was one of only three Cambridge colleges (the others being Selwyn and St John's) to issue its own stamps. From 1883 the college issued its own stamps to be sold to members of the college so that they could pre-pay the cost of a college messenger delivering their mail. This was instead of placing charges for deliveries on to members' accounts, to be paid at the end of each term.

The practice was stopped in 1886 by the General Post Office as it was decided that it was in contravention of its monopoly.

=== Queen Mother's standard ===
When the college patroness, Queen Elizabeth the Queen Mother, died, she gave the college the right to fly her personal standard in her memory on the first day of Michaelmas term each year.

=== Walking on the grass ===
Unlike at most Oxbridge colleges, not even Fellows may walk on the grass.

== People associated with the college ==
=== Notable former students ===
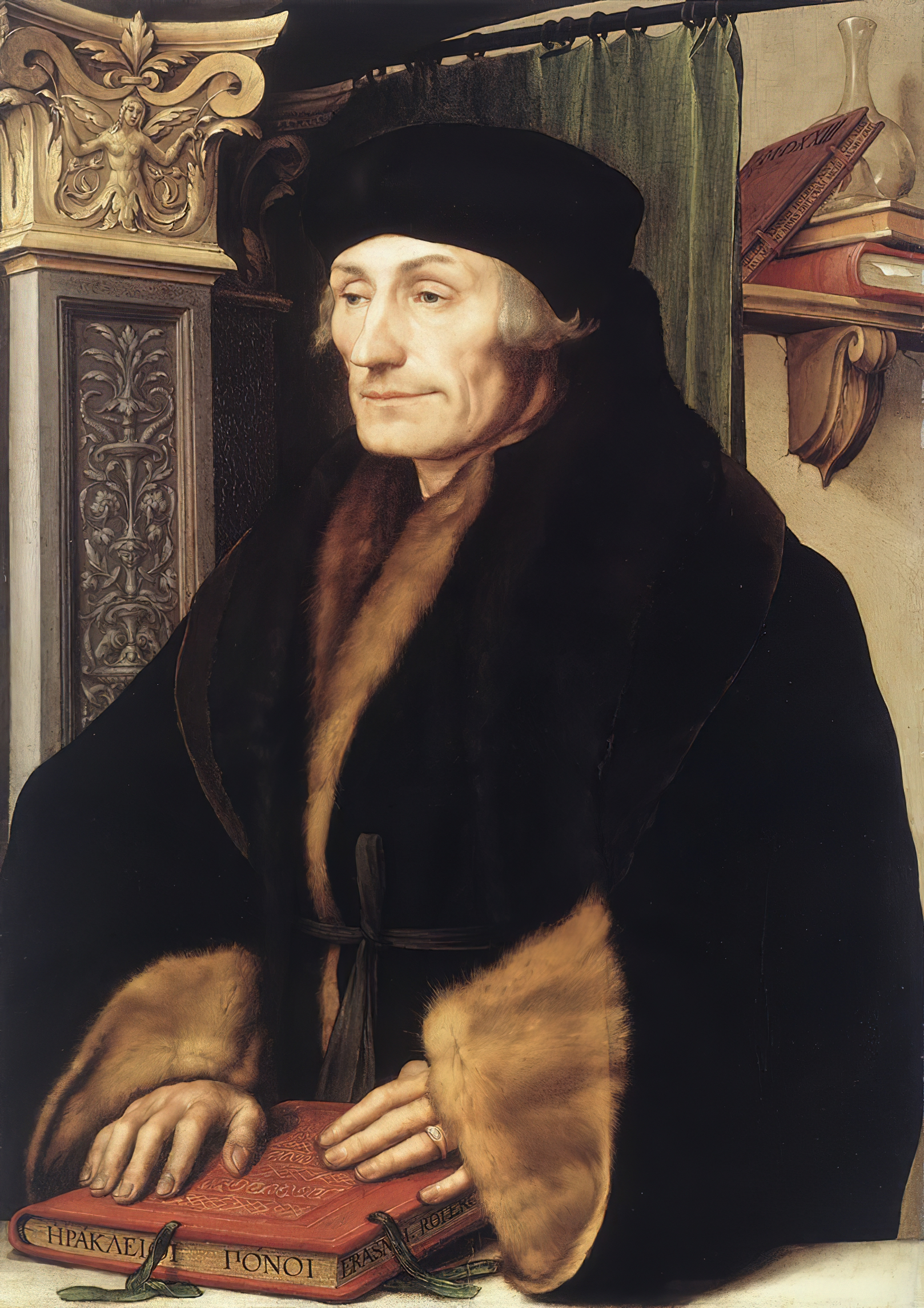
Erasmus, humanist, priest, social critic, teacher, and theologian

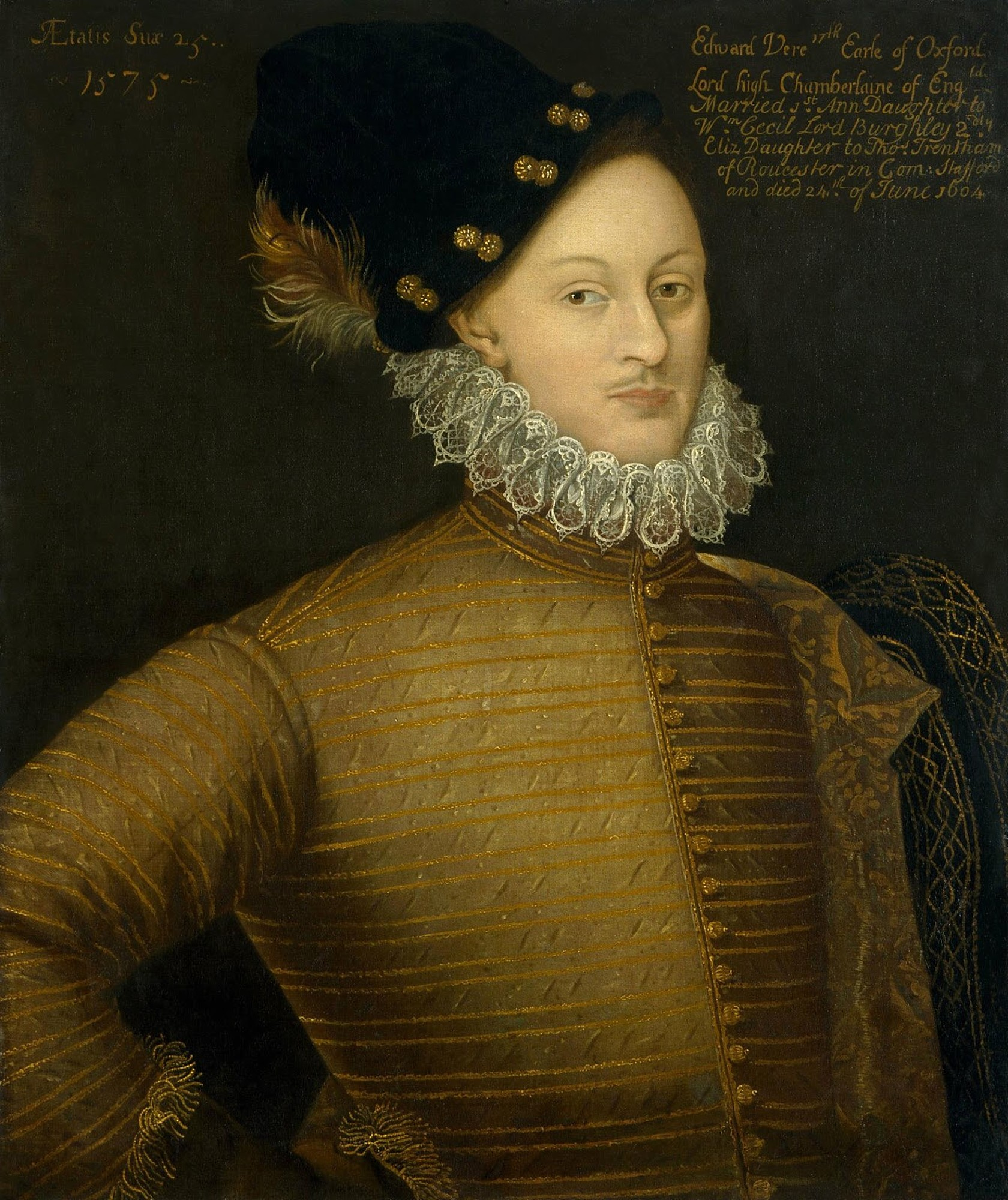
Edward de Vere, peer and courtier of the Elizabethan era

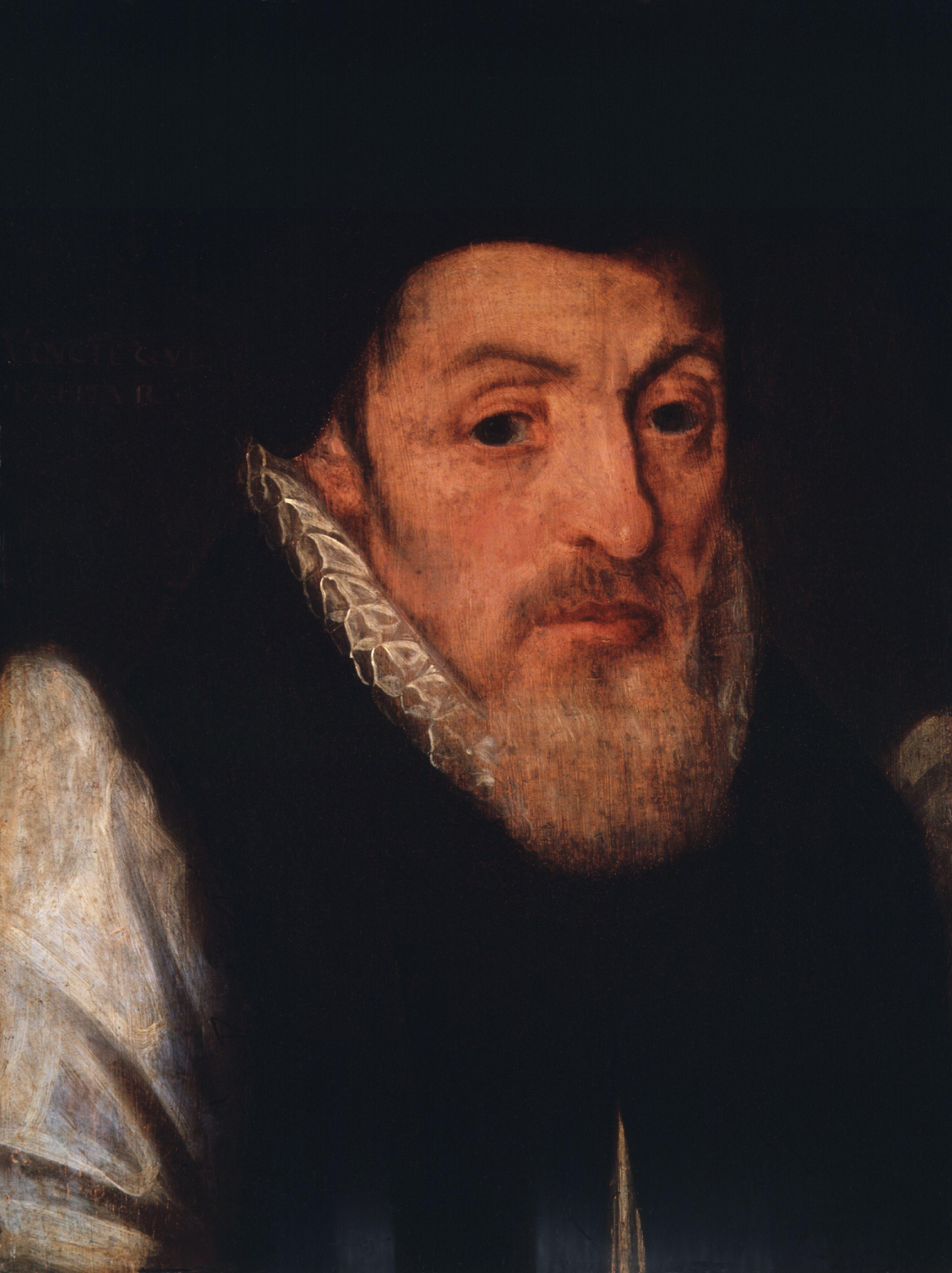
John Whitgift, Archbishop of Canterbury

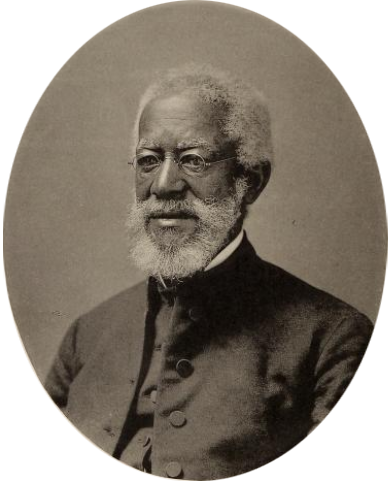
Alexander Crummell, minister, academic, and first black graduate of Cambridge University

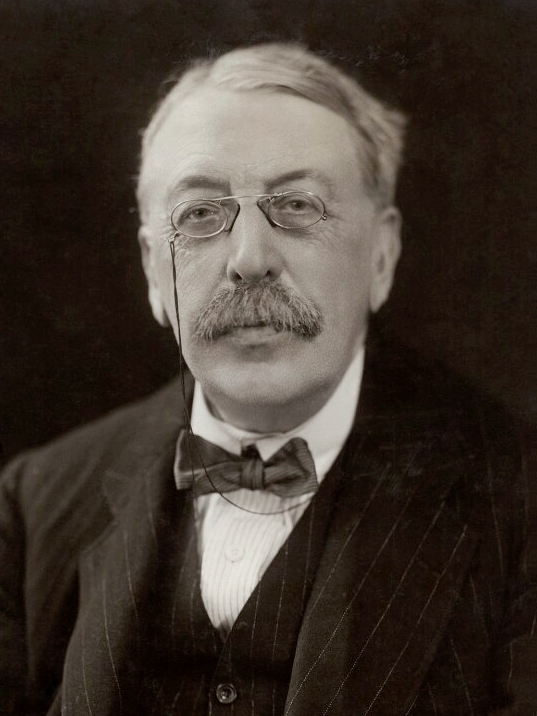
Charles Villiers Stanford, Irish composer

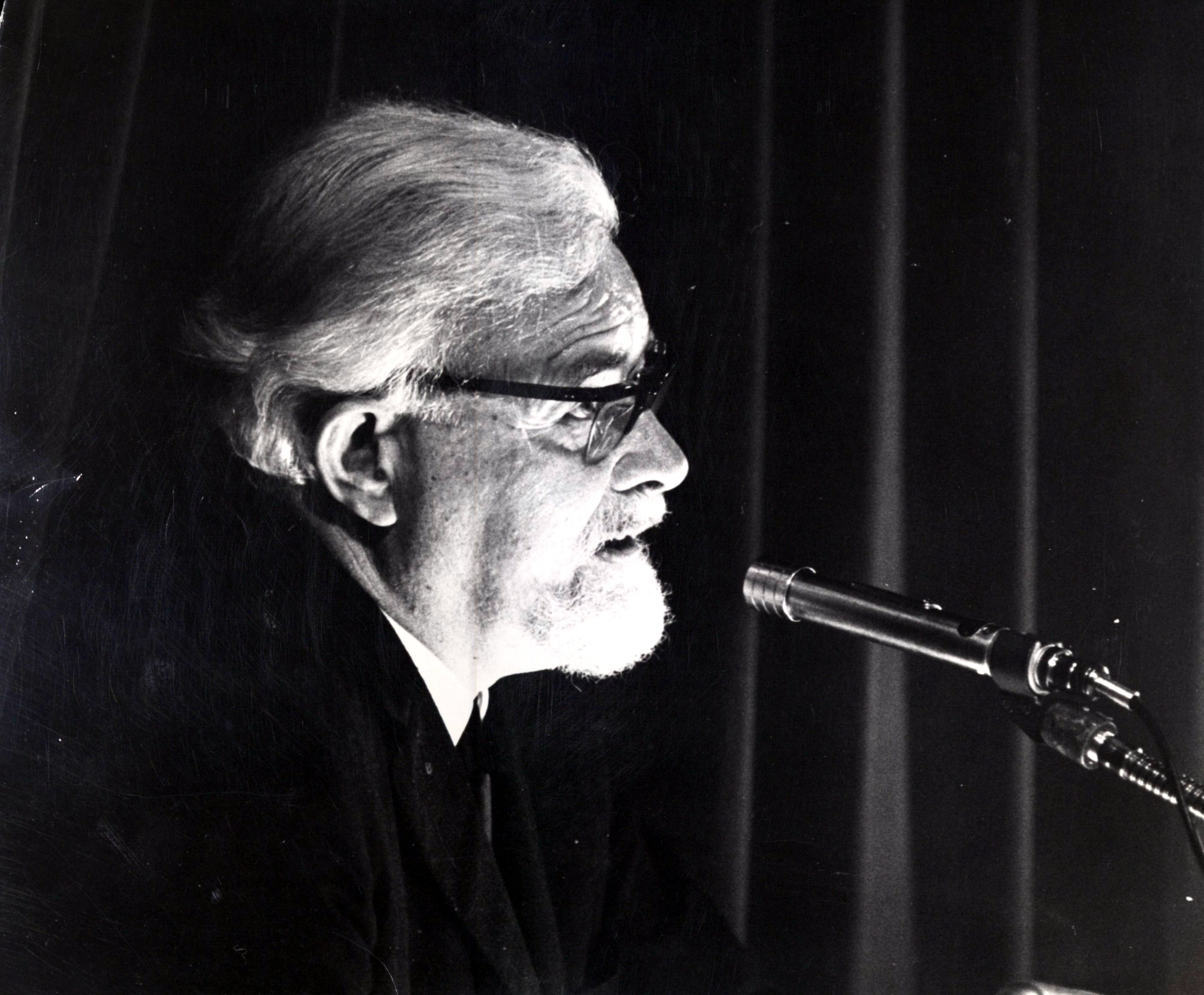
T. H. White, author of The Once and Future King series of novels

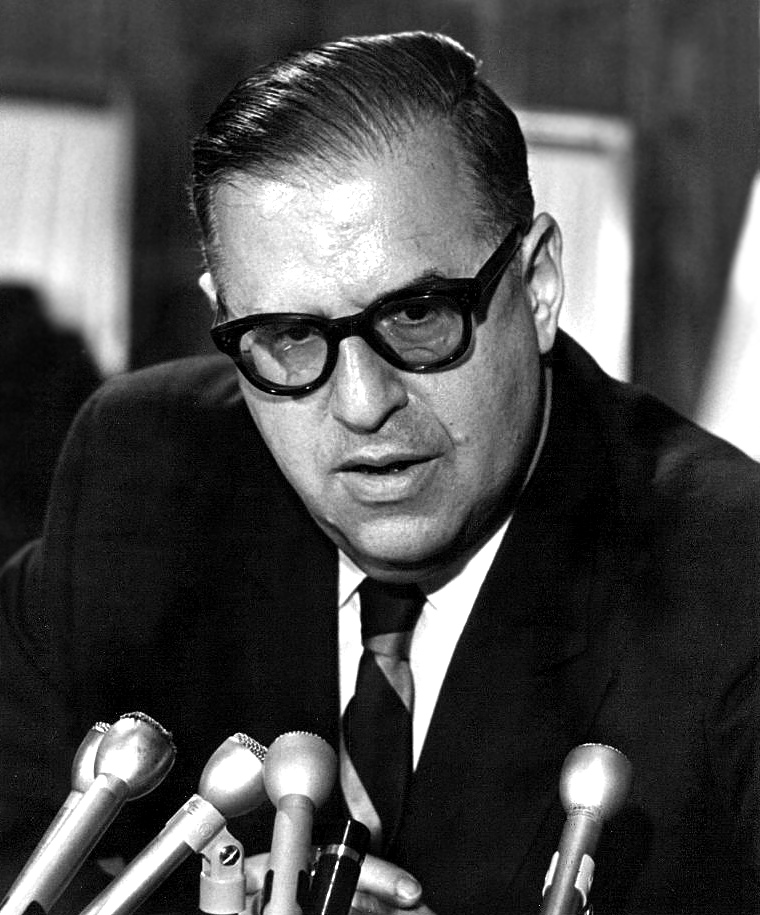
Abba Eban, Israeli politician

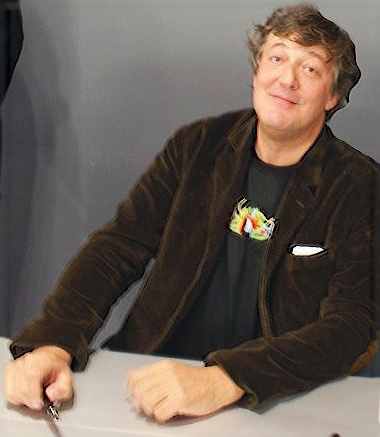
Stephen Fry, actor, author and comedian

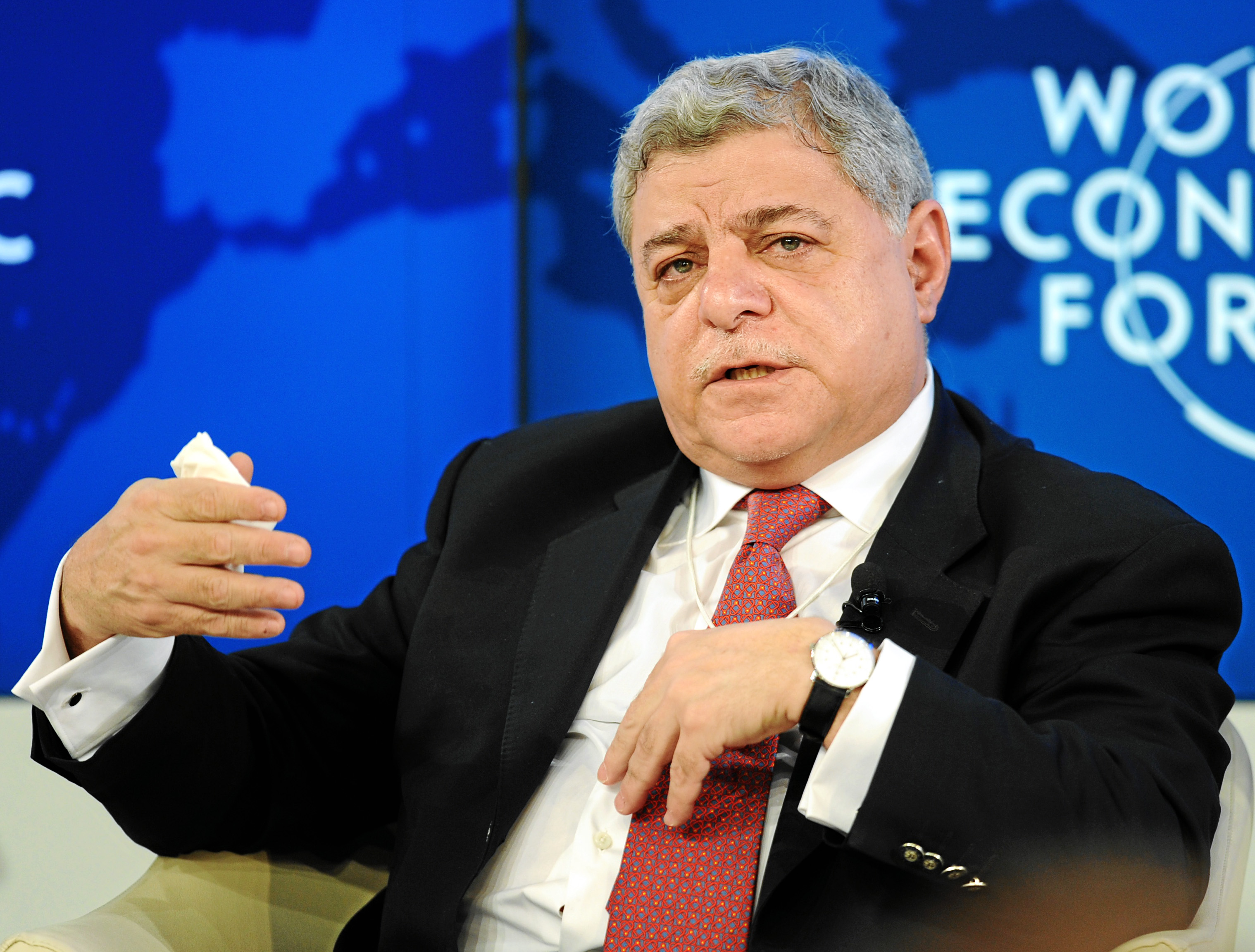
Awn Shawkat Al-Khasawneh, former Prime Minister of Jordan

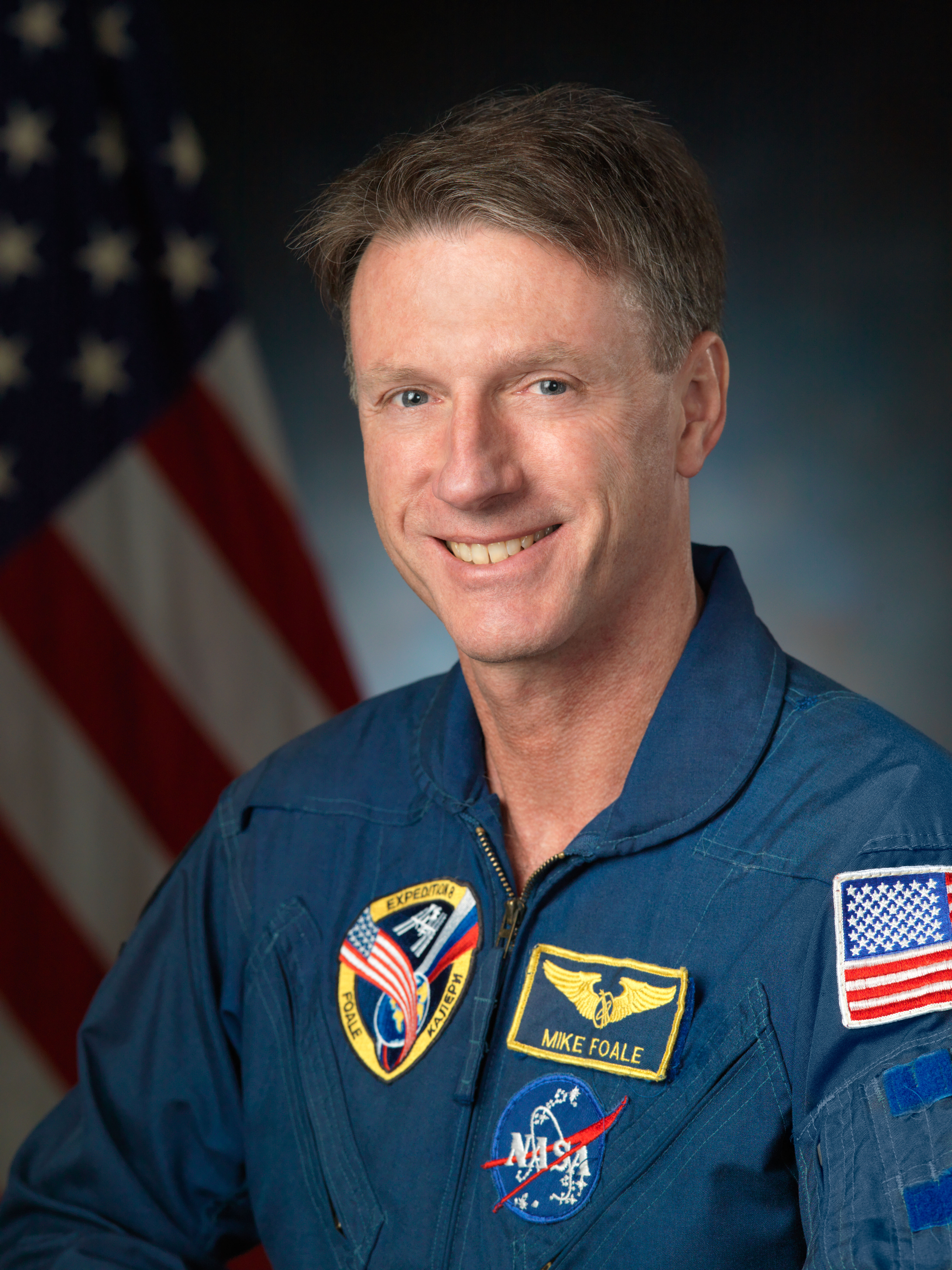
Michael Foale, a NASA astronaut

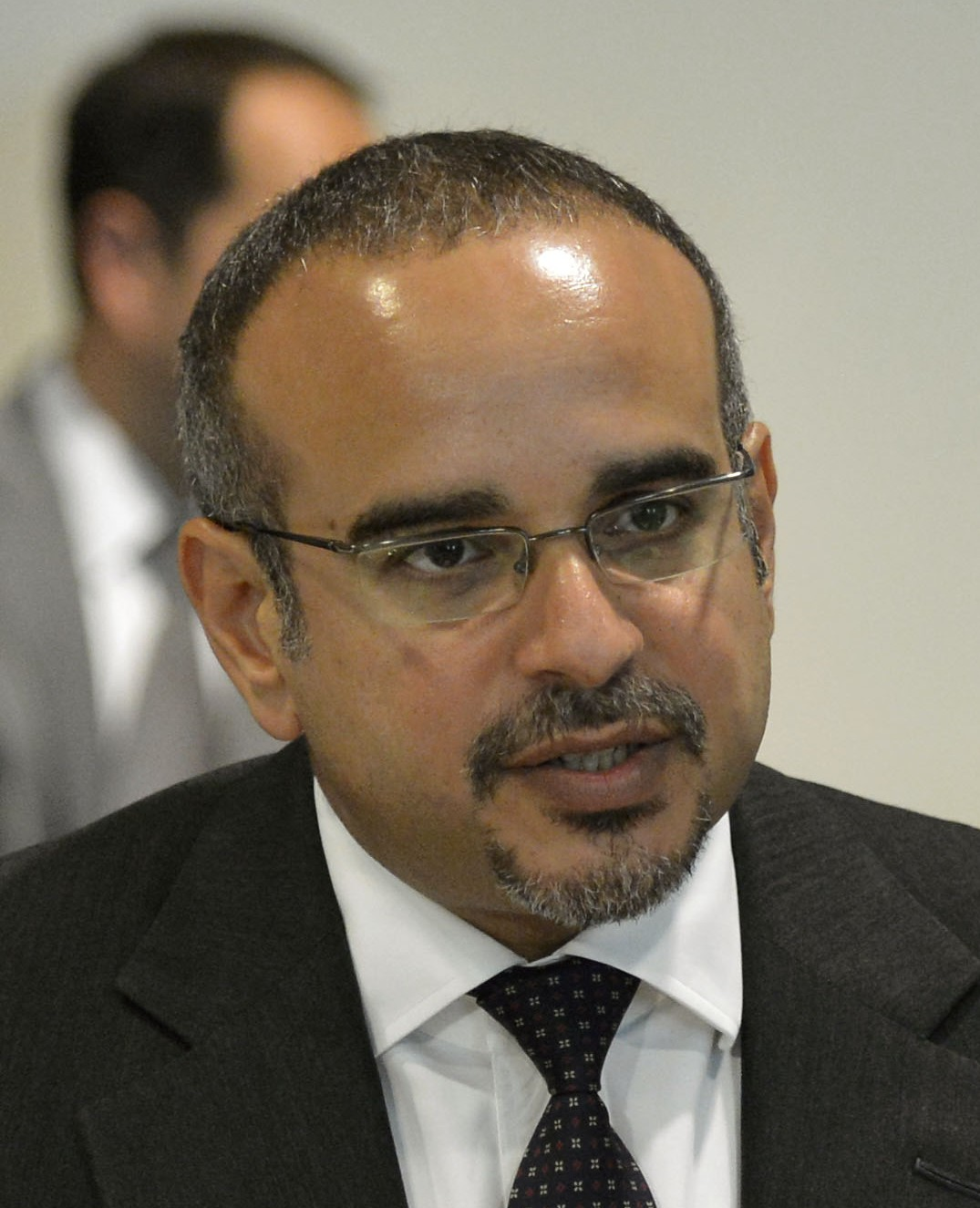
Prince Salman bin Hamad al Khalifa, Prime Minister of Bahrain

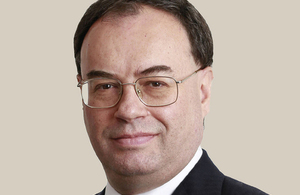
Andrew Bailey, Governor of the Bank of England

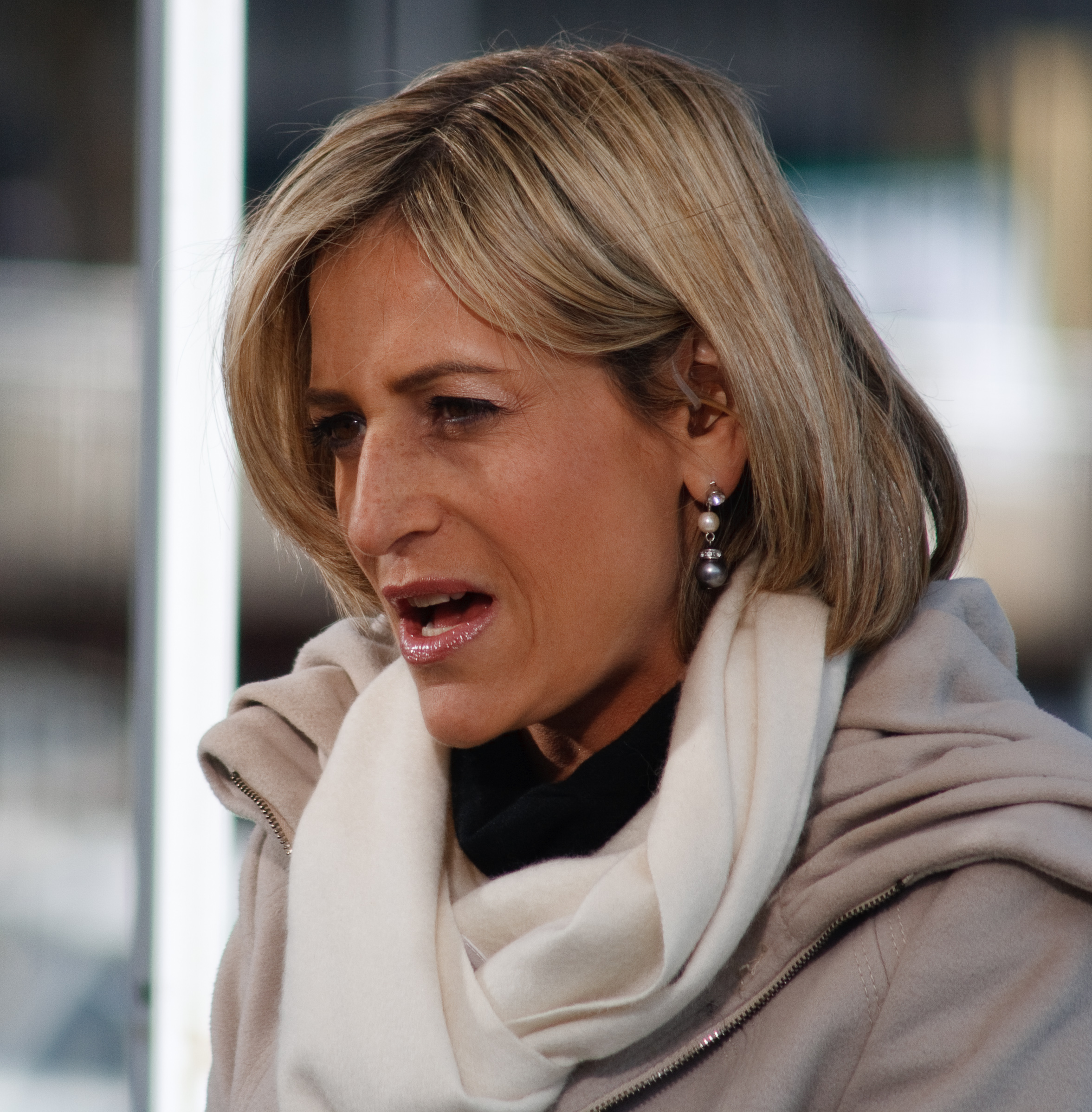
Emily Maitlis, a British journalist and newsreader

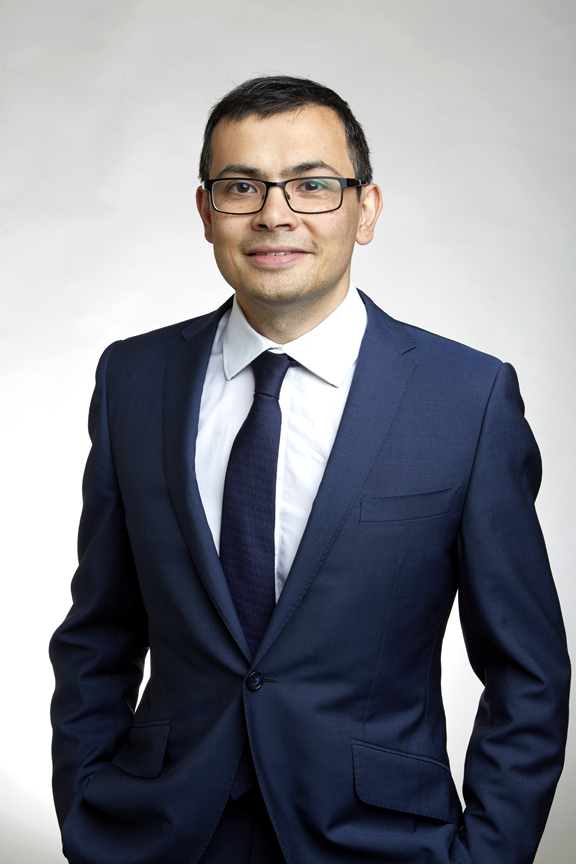
Demis Hassabis, Nobel Prize in Chemistry winner and founder of DeepMind

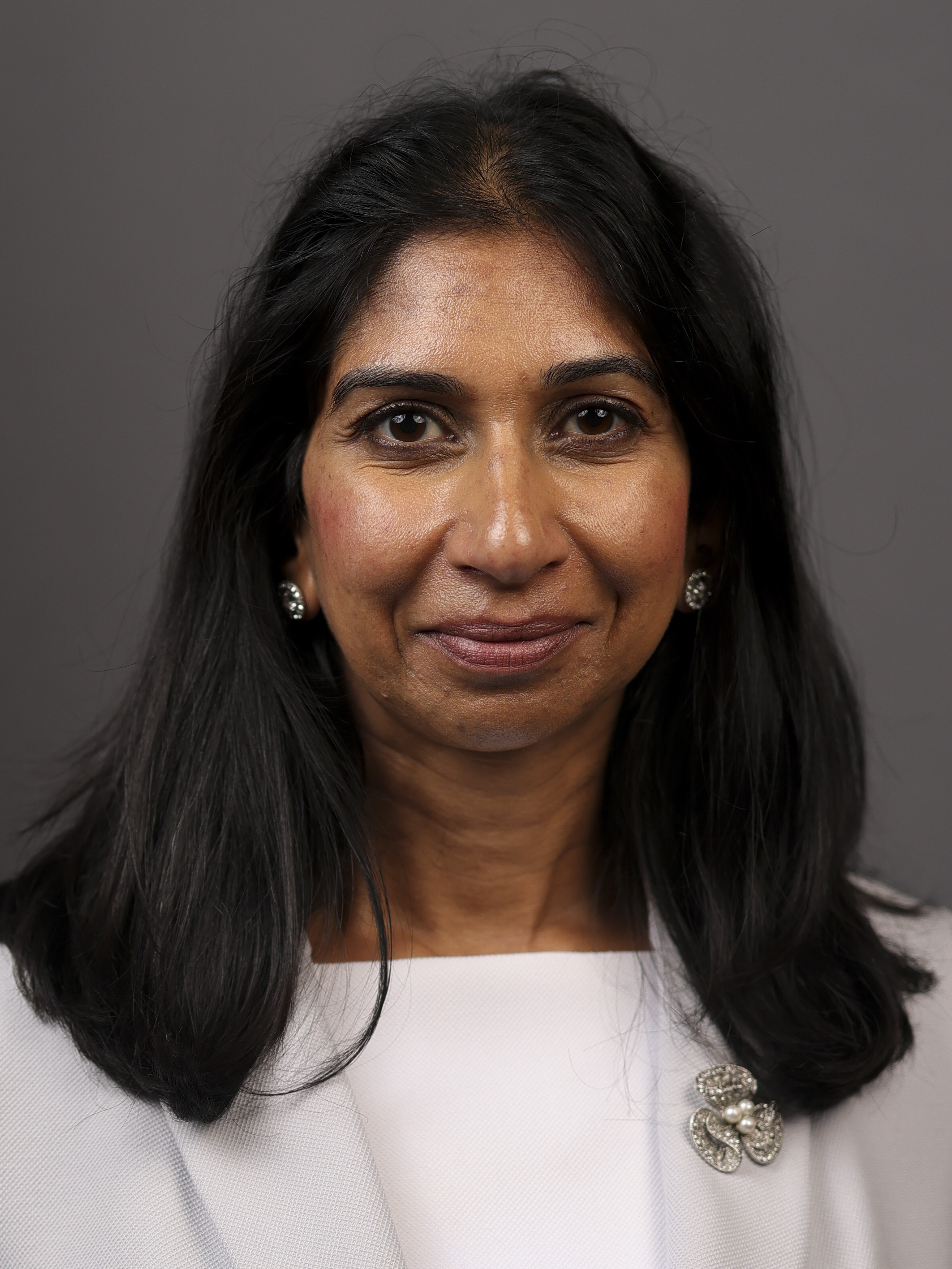
Suella Braverman, former Home Secretary

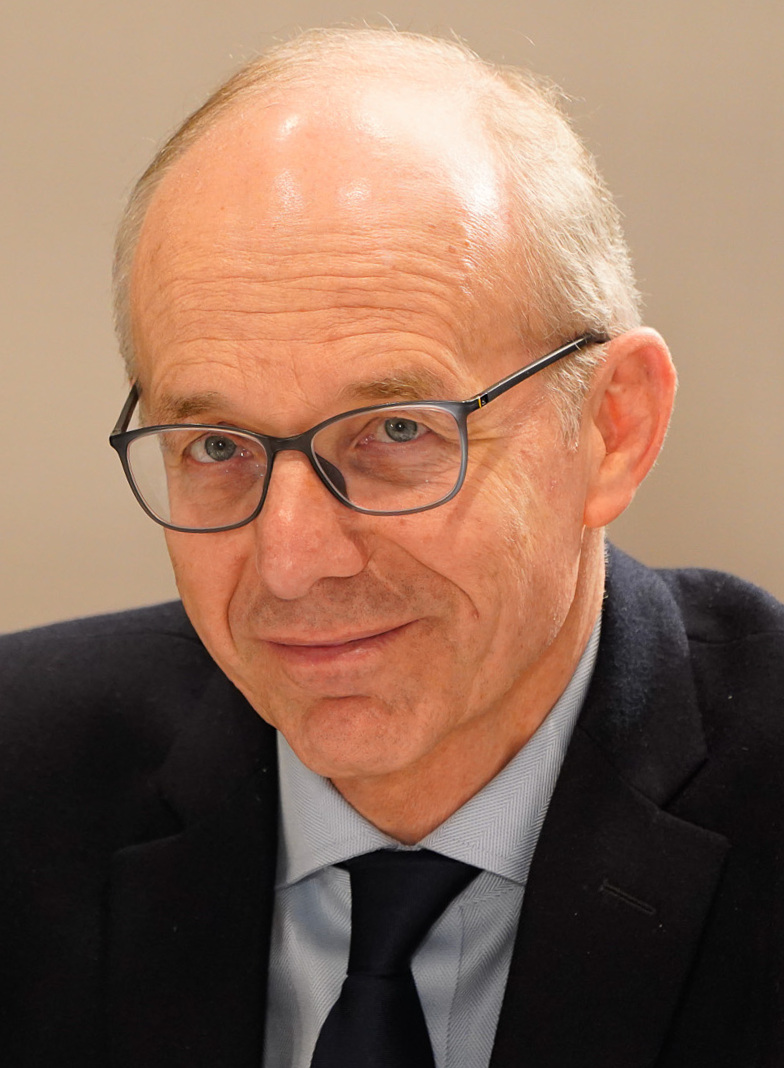
Luc Frieden, Prime Minister of Luxembourg

Name	Birth	Death	Career
Hugh Oldham	1452	1519	Bishop of Exeter
Desiderius Erasmus	1466	1536	Humanist, theologian, philosopher
John Frith	1503	1533	Writer, church reformer, martyr
John Aylmer	1521	1594	Bishop of London
John Whitgift	1530	1604	Archbishop of Canterbury
Henry Hastings, 3rd Earl of Huntingdon	1535	1595	Puritan nobleman and President of the Council of the North
Edward de Vere	1550	1604	Elizabethan courtier, poet, and playwright
Sir Oliver Cromwell	1566	1655	Landowner, lawyer and member of the House of Commons
John Davenant	1572	1641	Bishop of Salisbury
John Hall	1575	1635	Notable physician, and son-in-law of William Shakespeare
John Weever	1576	1632	Antiquary and poet
Lord Capell of Hadham	1608	1649	Royalist politician, executed on the orders of parliament
Thomas Villiers, 1st Earl of Clarendon	1709	1786	Diplomat and Whig politician
Earl of Hardwicke	1757	1834	Lord Lieutenant of Ireland
Robert Knight	1768	1855	English reforming radical and Member of Parliament
Alexander Crummell	1819	1898	Priest, African nationalist
Thomas Nettleship Staley	1823	1898	First Anglican bishop of the Church of Hawaii
Sir James Prendergast	1826	1921	Chief Justice of New Zealand
Osborne Reynolds	1842	1912	Innovator in the understanding of fluid dynamics, heat transfer
Charles Villiers Stanford	1852	1924	Music composer
Sir Charles Herbert Reilly	1874	1948	Architect and teacher
Sir William Peel	1875	1945	Governor of Hong Kong
Frank Rutter	1876	1937	Art critic, curator, writer, activist
Sir Shenton Thomas	1879	1962	Last Governor of the Straits Settlements
Arnold Spencer-Smith	1883	1916	Photographer on Shackleton's expedition
Tin Tut	1895	1948	Burma's first Foreign Minister, key negotiator for Burma's independence
Sir Roland Penrose	1900	1984	Artist, historian and poet, major collector of modern art
Gilbert Harding	1907	1960	Journalist and radio and television personality
T. H. White	1906	1964	Writer, best known for his sequence of Arthurian novels.
Joost de Blank	1908	1968	Archbishop of Cape Town known as the "scourge of apartheid"
Max Black	1909	1988	One of the leading analytic philosophers
Lesslie Newbigin	1909	1998	Bishop, missiologist, writer
William Ofori Atta	1910	1988	Ghanaian Foreign Minister
Anwar Nusseibeh	1913	1986	Jordanian Defense Minister
Les Bury	1913	1986	Australian Foreign Minister
Abba Eban	1915	2002	Israeli Foreign Affairs Minister and Deputy Prime Minister
Sir Michael Gass	1916	1983	Colonial Administrator during the 1967 Hong Hong riots
Lord Wedderburn of Charlton	1927	2012	British politician, member of the House of Lords
George Horace Brooke Thompson	1928	2025	British Physicist
Murray Roston	1928		Literary scholar
Peter Ball	1932	2019	Disgraced former Bishop of Gloucester
David Willey	1932	2026	Author, former Reuters and long-term BBC Rome and Vatican correspondent
Kevin Billington	1934	2021	Theatre and film director
Upali Wijewardene	1938	1983	Sri Lankan businessman
José Cabranes	1940		United States Court of Appeals judge
Bernardo Sepúlveda Amor	1941		Mexican Secretary of Foreign Affairs, vice-president of the International Court of Justice
Lord Williams of Mostyn	1941	2003	Leader of the House of Lords
Brian Charlesworth	1945		Evolutionary biologist
Richard Dearlove	1945		Chief of MI6
Lord Eatwell	1945		Economist
Zaki Nusseibeh	1946		United Arab Emirates Minister of State
Stephen Lander	1947		Director General of MI5
Richard Hickox	1948	2008	Conductor of choral, orchestral and operatic music
Yiannos Papantoniou	1949		Greek Finance Minister
Awn Shawkat Al-Khasawneh	1950		Prime Minister of Jordan, vice-president of the International Court of Justice
John McCallum	1950	2025	Academic and Member of the Canadian Parliament
Lord Falconer of Thoroton	1951		Lord Chancellor, Secretary of State for Justice
Edward Chaplin	1951		British Ambassador to Iraq, Jordan and Italy
Asif Saeed Khosa	1954		Chief Justice of Pakistan
Paul Greengrass	1955		Writer and film director
Gino Costa	1956		Peruvian politician and former Interior Minister
Roger Michell	1956	2021	Theatre and film director
Michael Foale	1957		Astrophysicist and astronaut
Stephen Fry	1957		Comedian, writer, actor, novelist
Mohamed El-Erian	1958		Former CEO of PIMCO, economist and investment analyst
Andrew Bailey	1959		Governor of the Bank of England
Kenneth Jeyaretnam	1959		Singaporean Opposition Leader
Joanna Scanlan	1961		Actress and screenwriter
David Ruffley	1962		Conservative Member of Parliament (MP)
Luc Frieden	1963		Prime Minister of Luxembourg
Richard K. Morgan	1965		British science fiction and fantasy author: Altered Carbon, Broken Angels
Robert Chote	1968		Economist; former chair of the Office of Budget Responsibility
Tom Holland	1968		Author and historian
Prince Salman bin Hamad al Khalifa	1969		Crown Prince and Prime Minister of Bahrain
Stephen Kinnock	1970		Labour Party MP and husband of Danish Prime Minister
Sam Lotu-Iiga	1970		Member of the New Zealand Parliament and Cabinet Member
Emily Maitlis	1970		BBC newsreader and journalist
Liz Kendall	1971		Labour Party frontbench politician
Vuk Jeremić	1975		President of the UN General Assembly and Serbian Minister of Foreign Affairs
Demis Hassabis	1976		Nobel laureate and founder of DeepMind
Lana Nusseibeh	1978		United Arab Emirates diplomat
Khalid Abdalla	1980		Actor known for United 93, Kite Runner and Green Zone
Brent Barton	1980		Member of Oregon House of Representatives
Suella Braverman	1980		Reform UK Member of Parliament (MP) and former Home Secretary
Mark Watson	1980		Comedian, novelist
Simon Bird	1984		Actor in E4 comedy series The Inbetweeners
Julia Lopez	1984		Conservative MP
Jamie Roberts	1986		Welsh rugby union player
James Maynard	1987		Number theorist and Fields Medal recipient
Hannah Murray	1989		Actress in award-winning series Skins and Game of Thrones

=== Presidents ===
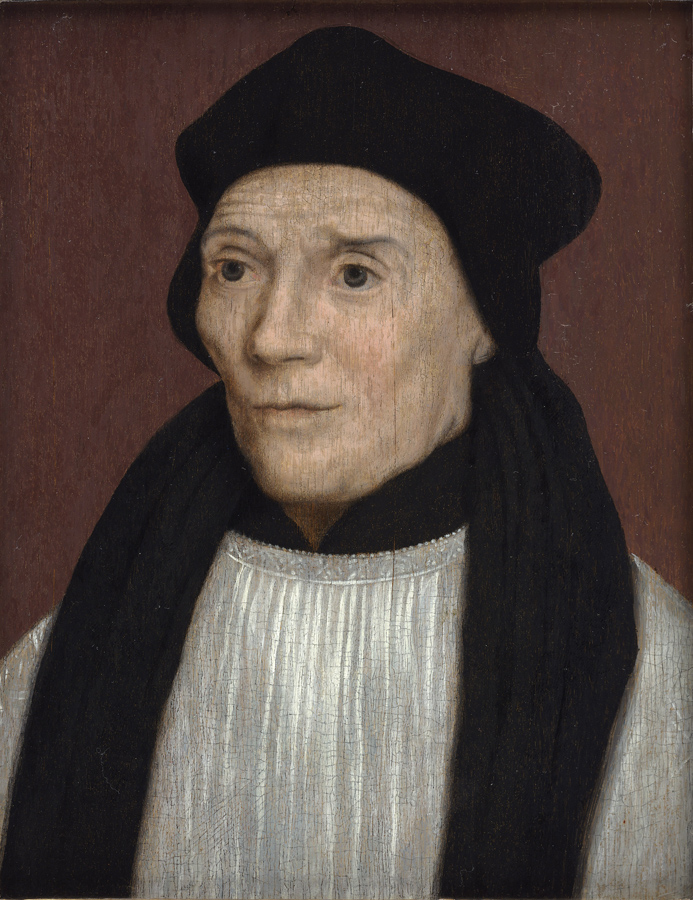
Saint John Fisher, president 1505–1508

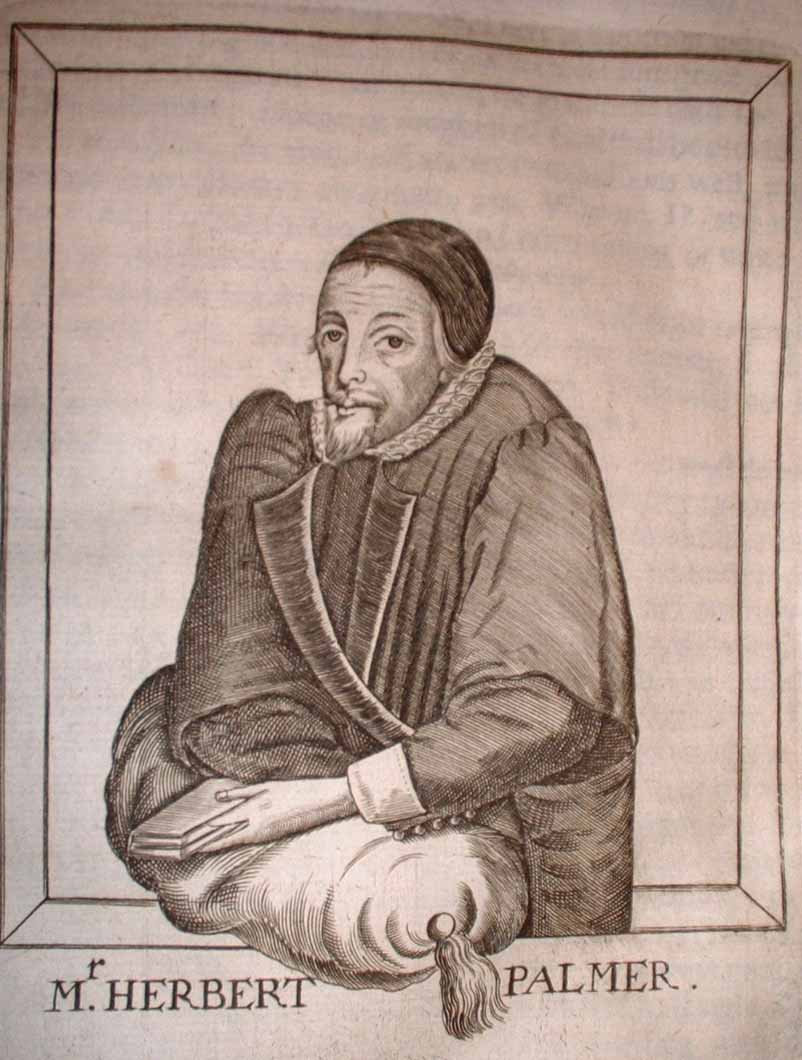
Herbert Palmer, president 1644–1647.

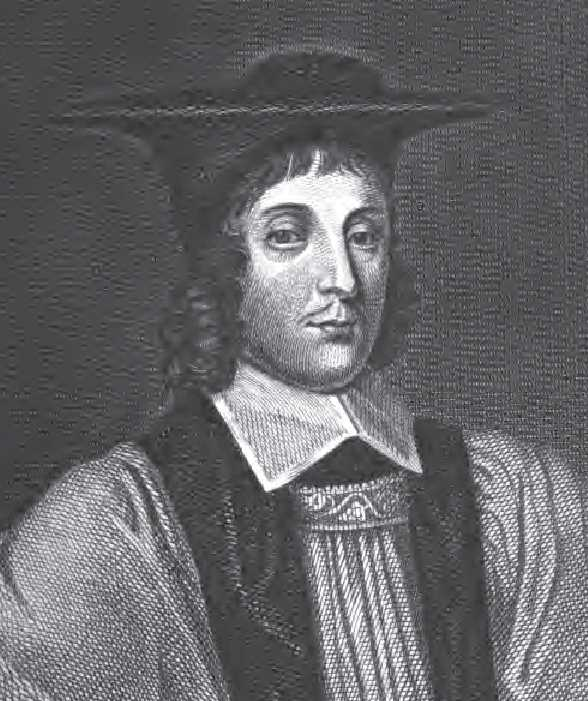
Anthony Sparrow, president 1662–1667

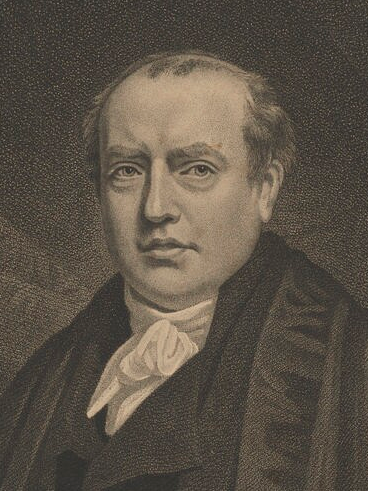
Isaac Milner, president 1788–1820.

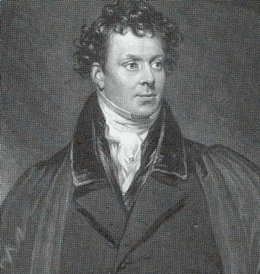
Joshua King, president 1832–1857

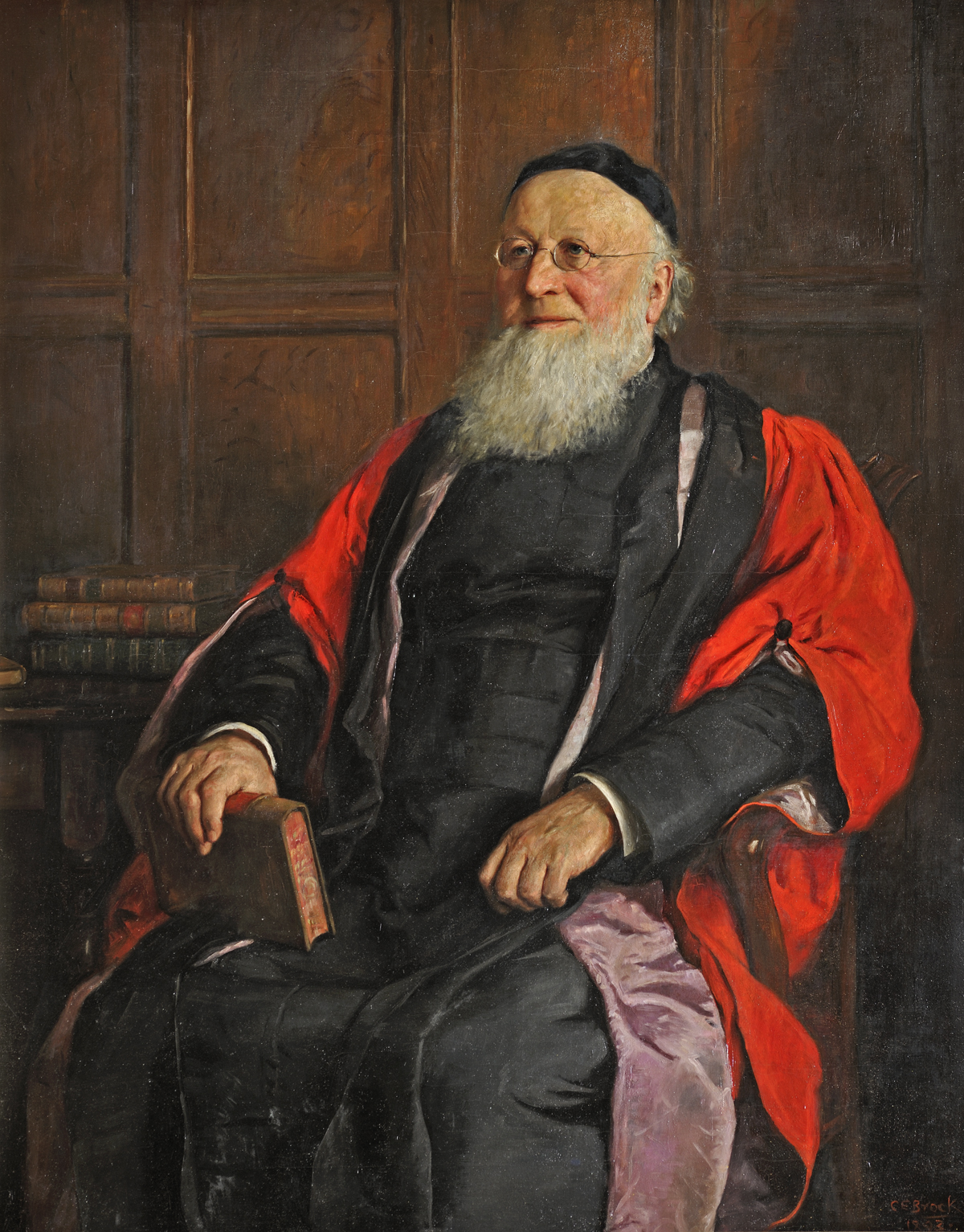
William Magan Campion, president 1892–1896

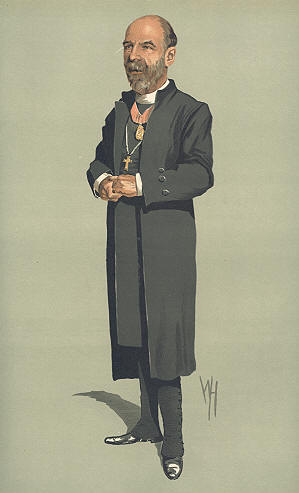
Herbert Ryle, president 1896–1901

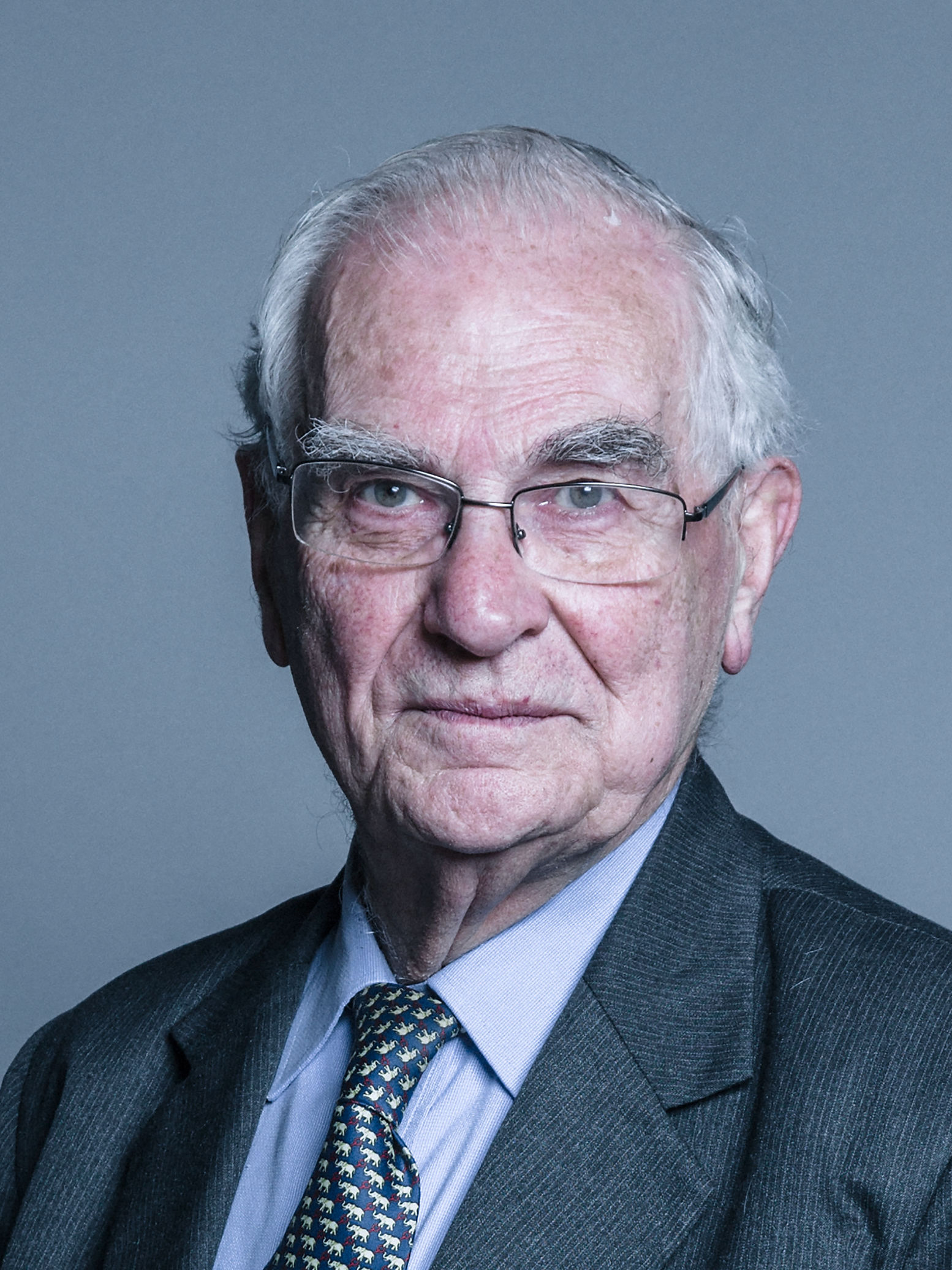
Lord Oxburgh, president 1982–1988

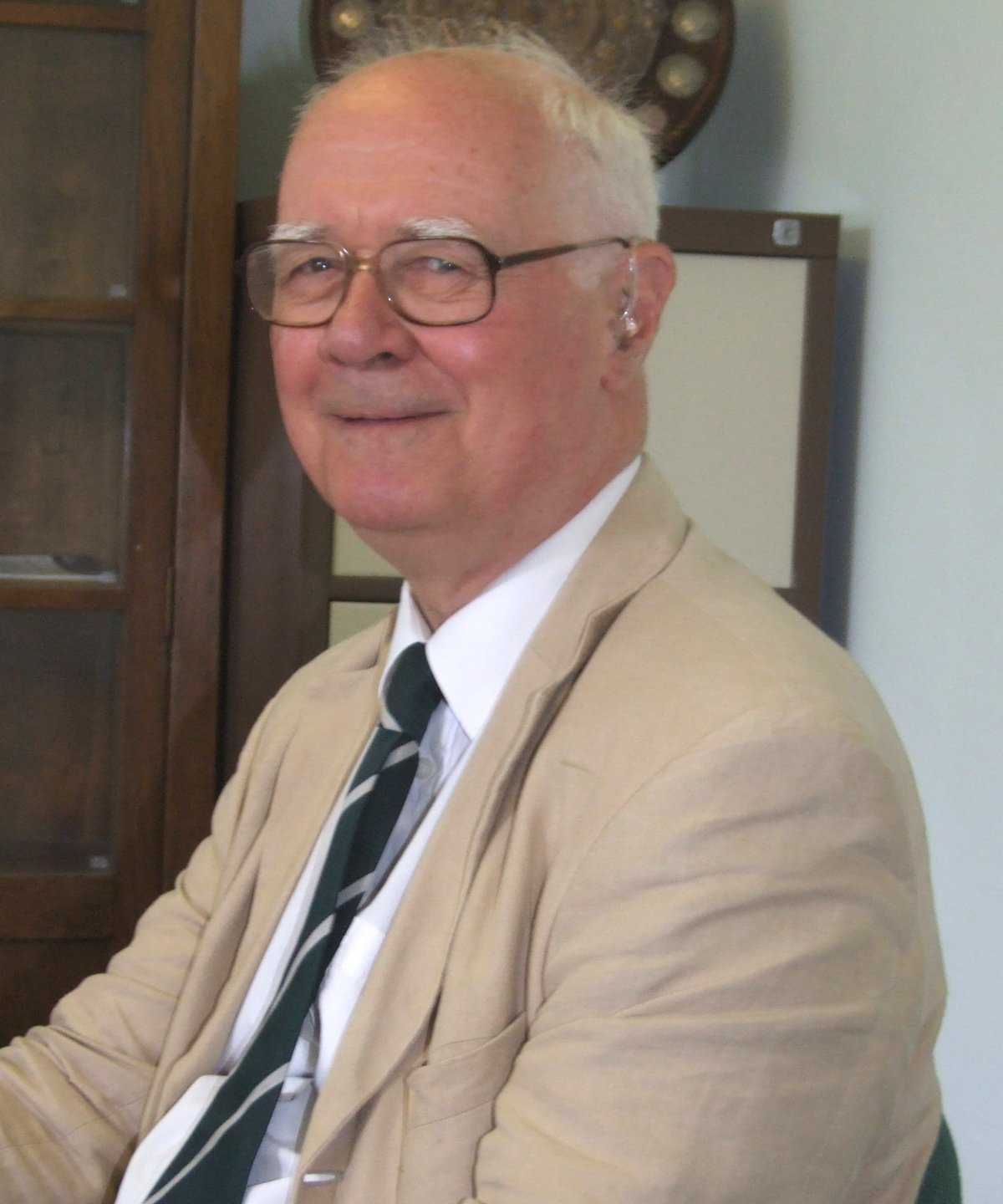
Sir John Polkinghorne, president 1989–1996

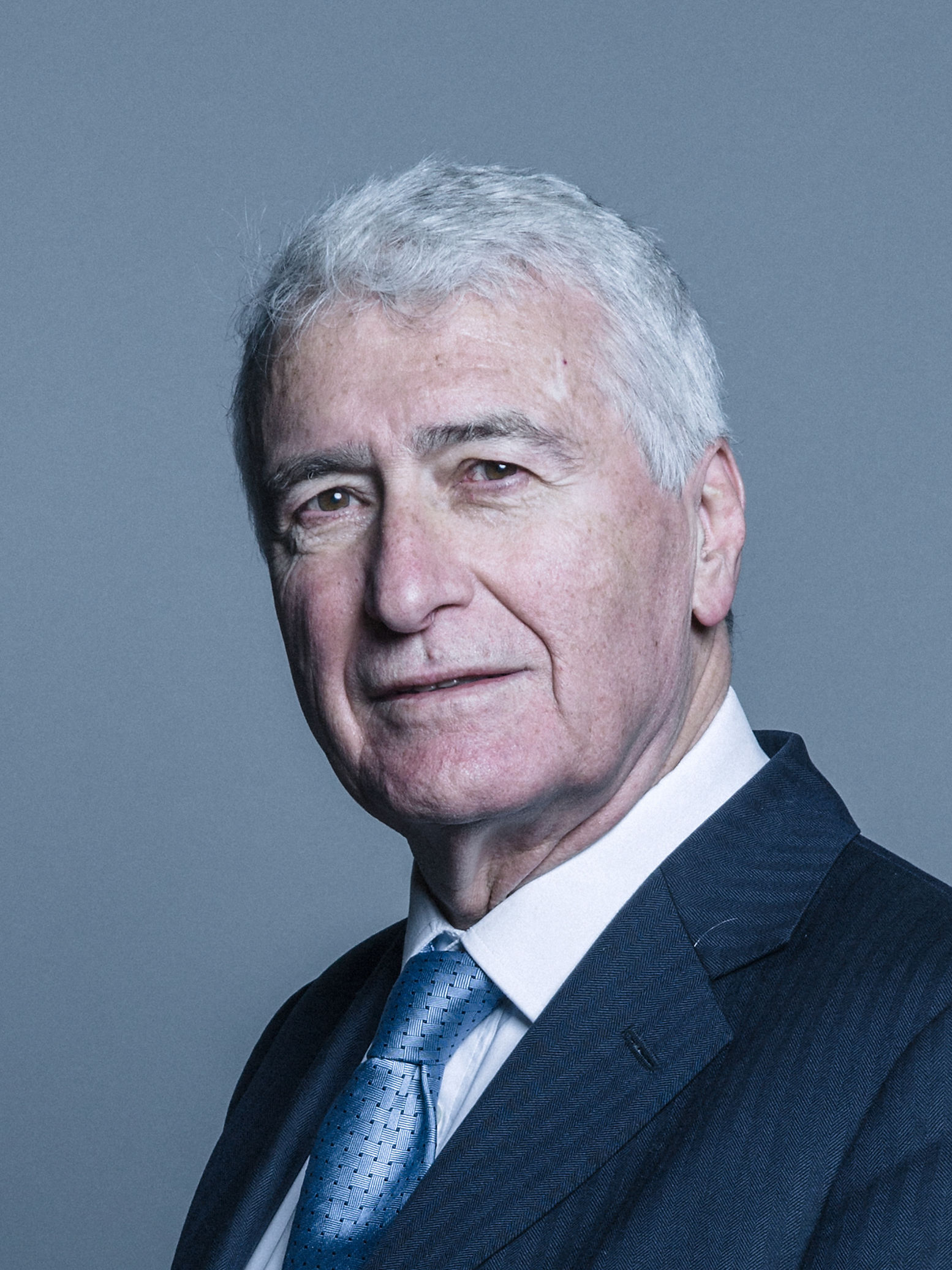
Lord Eatwell, president 1997–2020

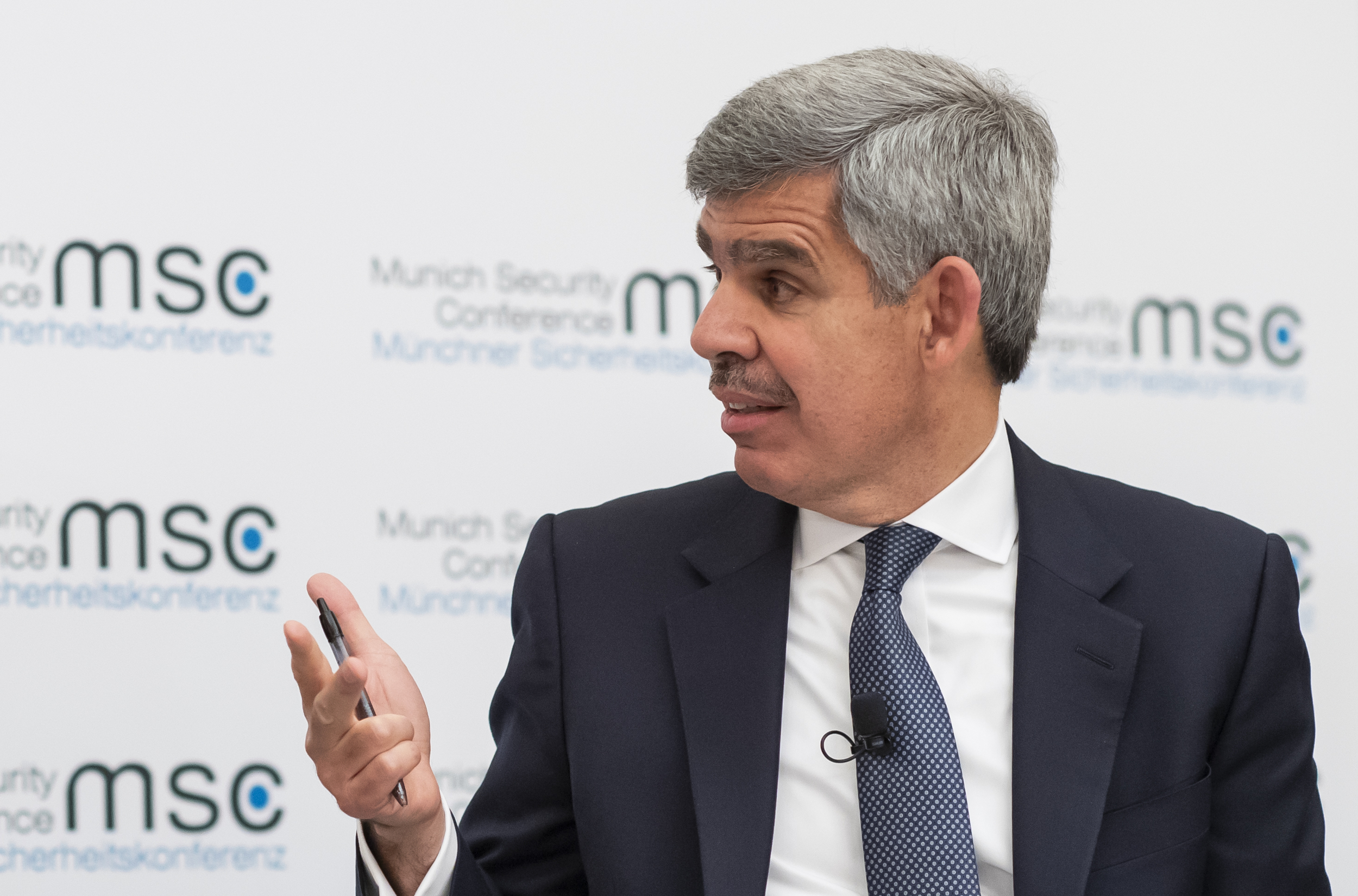
Dr Mohamed A. El-Erian, president 2020–2025

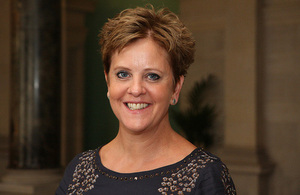
Dame Menna Rawlings, president 2025–present

=== Royal patronesses ===
The college enjoyed royal patronage in its early years. Then, after a 425-year break, Elizabeth Bowes-Lyon became the college patron to mark the 550th anniversary of the college's foundation. A portrait of the late Queen Mother by June Mendoza hangs in the Senior Combination Room and the most recent court to be built in college, Lyon Court, is named after her.

Queen Elizabeth II was a patron of the college from 2003 until her death in 2022.

== In popular culture ==
The college has made its way into literature, film and television.

- Darkness at Pemberley (1932 novel) by T. H. White features St Bernard's College, a fictionalised version of Queens' College.
- In 1984, Queens' was the subject of an eight-part BBC fly-on-the-wall documentary entitled Queens': A Cambridge College.
- In the American action-thriller film The Bourne Supremacy (2004), the first of a trilogy featuring Robert Ludlum's Jason Bourne character, there are numerous visual cues and oblique references to various Cambridge colleges, but predominantly Queens', where the director Paul Greengrass and one of the producers were both students in the mid-1970s.
- Eskimo Day (1996 TV Drama), written by Jack Rosenthal, and starring Maureen Lipman, Tom Wilkinson, and Alec Guinness, is about the relationship between parents and teenagers during an admissions interview day at Queens' College. There was also a sequel, Cold Enough for Snow (1997).
- Starter for 10 (2006 film) starring James McAvoy includes the filming of a University Challenge episode between Queens' College and Bristol University.
- In Kingdom (2007–2009 TV series), created by Simon Wheeler and Alan Whiting, solicitor Peter Kingdom (played by Stephen Fry) and his brother (Dominic Mafham) are both Cambridge graduates. In the fourth episode of the first series, Kingdom returns to Cambridge and meets his old tutor (Richard Wilson), when one of his clients alleges that her daughter has been rejected by his old college purely because of her working-class background. Although the college is never identified, it is Queens', where Fry himself was a student, that appears on screen.
- Old Hall was used as the backdrop to the music video, Things We Lost in the Fire, by the band Bastille—backing vocals were provided by the College Choir
- The college is the backdrop for the Secret Diary of a Porter Girl blog, created by Lucy Brazier a former deputy head porter.
- Queens' is used as a backdrop in the 2024 BBC comedy drama Ludwig

== See also ==
- List of organ scholars
