= Swingamajig =

- Genre: Electro swing
- Dates: May 1st 2016
- Locations: Rainbow Venues, Birmingham, England, UK
- Years active: 4
- Founders: Electric Swing Circus
- Website: http://swingamajig.co.uk/

Swingamajig is an annual music festival that takes place in Birmingham, West Midlands, England. It is the UK's first one-day urban festival dedicated to electro swing, Gypsy folk and vintage sounds. Swingamajig "takes the sounds and styles of the 1920s and brings them up to date with a modern twist, bringing together several thousand of the best dressed ladies and gents to party like it is 1929". First held in May 2013, Swingamajig Festival comprises elements of live music, DJ sets, film, art, dance and circus performances across four diverse stages.

== History ==
Swingamajig grew out of the success of Hot Club de Swing, a regular electro swing club night that began in 2011 and is held at the Hare and Hounds, Kings Heath, Birmingham. Curated by The Electric Swing Circus, one of the UK's hottest electro swing acts who have performed at Glastonbury Festival, Shambala Festival, Boomtown, Bestival, Secret Garden Party, WOMAD, Nozstock and Mostly Jazz Festival, the success of Hot Club De Swing led to the band's development of Swingamajig in 2013.

== Line up 2013 ==
The festival was held at Spotlight, Digbeth, Birmingham and featured the following acts:

- The Correspondents
- Electric Swing Circus
- DJ Switch
- Madame Electrifie
- Dutty Moonshine
- Odjbox & Pierre
- C@ in the H@
- Circoswing
- DJ Chris Tofu
- Lamuzgueul
- Elle & The Pocket Belles
- Rumjig
- Don Johnston & Leo Wood
- Johnny Kowalski & The Sexy Weirdos
- The Killer Dillers
- Myko Du Mal
- Jon Bongly
- Lady Swing
- The Chicken Brothers
- Jolt
- Jam Tidy
- Folie A Deux
- DJ Mylz
- Billy Chill Fingers

== Line up 2014 ==
Swingamajig 2014 took place on 4 May at Spotlight, Digbeth, Birmingham and featured the following artists:

- Molotov Jukebox
- Electric Swing Circus
- The Destroyers
- Renegade Brass Band
- Smokey Joe and the Kid
- Sam Green and the Midnight Heist
- Jenova Collective
- Little Violet
- After Hours Quintet
- Lunatrix
- Mr Tea and the Minions
- Holy Moly and the Crackers
- Temple Funk Collective
- Playing Django
- The Collective 43
- The Swingamajig House Band

DJ sets

- A.Skillz
- Bobby Friction
- C@ in the H@
- Jamie Berry
- Costa Le Gitan
- Wolfie Razzmatazz
- Chris Tofu
- Nick Hollywood
- Big Swing Sounds System feat. HypeMan Sage
- Jamko
- Madame Electrifie
- DJR
- Myko du Mal
