= Commemoration ball =

Formal ball at the University of Oxford, UK

A Commemoration ball is a formal ball held by one of the colleges of the University of Oxford in the 9th week of Trinity Term, the week after the end of the last Full Term of the academic year, which is known as "Commemoration Week". Commemoration balls are held by different colleges each year, following a cycle by which each college holds a ball every three years.

Commemoration Week is so known because of the ceremonies in commemoration of the benefactors of the university that are held then, namely the Commemoration Day sermon formerly held (until 2006) on the Sunday, and the Encaenia ceremony (where the annual Creweian Oration in honour of benefactors is given) and garden party on the Wednesday of that week. Commemoration Week was formerly one of two occasions when balls were traditionally held, the other being Eights Week, the 5th week of Trinity term when the Summer Eights rowing races occur. Eights balls are nowadays comparatively rare.

== Definition ==
There is no formal definition of a Commemoration ball, but the usual Oxford convention is to refer only to the larger, triennial balls as Commemoration balls. The dress code is usually white tie. Many other colleges hold smaller events during Commemoration Week that they call summer balls or parties rather than Commemoration balls. These are usually held on an annual or irregular basis, and are usually black tie. Merton College holds a triennial winter ball.

== History ==
In the past, Commemoration balls were held "night after night" by different colleges during Commemoration Week. With many colleges now holding smaller annual summer balls, Commemoration balls are now held by only some of the larger colleges, who still follow the traditional triennial cycle. Oriel College hosts a ball in the first year of the three-year cycle, and until recently Magdalen College also did. However Magdalen College cancelled their ball in 2015 at the last minute downgrading to a smaller affair. Currently, in the second year, there are Commemoration balls held by New College and The Queen's College. In the third year, there are now four colleges with this honour (Worcester College, Christ Church, Trinity College, St. John's College).

The 2005 Christ Church Commemoration ball was the first to be held by that college for fifteen years because of an incident at the 1990 ball that led to the Governing Body suspending the ball and replacing it with an annual summer party until 2005. Until 1990 the three great Oxford choral foundations of Magdalen College (first year), New College (second year) and Christ Church (third year) held their "white tie" Commemoration Balls in consecutive years on a triennial basis, each being widely regarded as the most prestigious ball being held in Oxford in that year, but the 1990 incident at Christ Church upset the tradition as various other colleges claimed Christ Church's (third year) slot, and continue to do so after the Christ Church Ball was reinstated in 2005. The cancellation of Magdalen College's (first year) Commemoration Ball in 2015, and its reinstatement in the "New College" (second) year of 2016, completed the break with tradition.

== List of balls ==
Year	College	Performers	Notes
1964	Magdalen College	The Rolling Stones	
1973	Jesus College	Steeleye Span	
1999	New College	St Etienne	
1999	Trinity College	Coldplay, Jools Holland	
2003	Magdalen College		
2004	New College	Dizzee Rascal	
2005	Christ Church		
2005	St John's College	Goldie Lookin Chain	450th anniversary of the college's foundation
2005	Trinity College	Supergrass	
2005	Worcester College		
2006	Magdalen College	Pharrell, Bodyrockers	
2007	New College	Ash	
2008	Christ Church	The Wombats	
2008	St John's College		
2008	Trinity College	Sugababes, Stornoway	
2008	Worcester College	One Night Only, Logistics	
2009	Magdalen College	Feeder, The Pipettes	
2009	Oriel College	Ladyhawke, Scratch Perverts	
2010	Merton College	Electric Six	
2010	New College	Scouting for Girls	
2010	Wadham College		
2011	Christ Church	Tinchy Stryder	
2011	St John's College	The Feeling	
2011	Trinity College	The Streets, Sophie Ellis-Bextor	
2011	Worcester College	Mystery Jets	
2012	Magdalen College	Athlete, Labrinth, Loick Essien, Natty, Roll Deep	
2012	Oriel College	The Feeling	
2013	Balliol College	Mark Ronson	750th Anniversary of the College's foundation
2013	New College	The Fratellis	
2014	Christ Church	Laura Mvula, A Skillz, The Oxford Imps	
2014	Exeter College		700th Anniversary Commemorative Ball
2014	Hertford College		Bridge of Sighs Commemoration Ball
2014	Merton College		Summer Ball
2014	St John's College	The Hoosiers, Pendulum, Jigsaw & Dynamite MC, Eliza and the Bear	
2014	Trinity College	Clean Bandit, AlunaGeorge, The Correspondents, DJ Heidi, Friend Within	
2014	Worcester College	Maxïmo Park, Stornoway with Oxford University Sinfonietta, The Correspondents, DJ EZ, Jaymo & Andy George	Tercentenary
2015	Magdalen College		Cancelled
2015	Oriel College		
2016	Magdalen College	Chase and Status, VITAMIN, The Electric Swing Circus	
2016	New College	Circa Waves, Gentleman's Dub Club, Afriquoi	
2016	The Queen's College		
2017	Christ Church	Scouting for Girls, Redlight	
2017	Corpus Christi College		
2017	St John's College	Example	
2017	Trinity College	Izzy Bizu, Tiggs da Author, Clokkemaker	
2017	Worcester College		
2018	Oriel College	Sigma	
2019	Magdalen College		Cancelled again
2019	New College		
2019	The Queen's College	Everything Everything	
2022	Christ Church		
2022	New College	Example, The Academic	
2022	The Queen's College	Boney M.	
2022	Trinity College		
2023	Balliol College		Third Commemoration held at the College since 1969
2023	Corpus Christi College		
2023	Magdalen College	The Hunna	
2023	Oriel College	Scouting for Girls, Toploader	
2023	St John's College	Mura Masa (record producer)	
2023	Worcester College	Jungle	
2024	Pembroke College	Scouting for Girls	400th Anniversary of the College's foundation
2025	Balliol College		
2025	Christ Church	The Japanese House	
2025	Hertford College		
2025	Lady Margaret Hall College		
2025	New College	Hard Life	
2025	St Hilda's College		
2025	The Queen's College		
2025	Wadham College	Pixie Lott, Arthi Nachiappan	
2026	Magdalen College	Rizzle Kicks	
2026	Oriel College	Groove Armada	
2026	St John's College	Boney M	
2026	Trinity College	The Fratellis	
2026	Worcester College	Circa Waves	

== See also ==
- Colleges of the University of Oxford
- May Ball - similar events at the University of Cambridge
