= Caravan Palace (album) =

Studio album by Caravan Palace
- Released: 20 October 2008
- Genre: Electro swing
- Length: 54:44
- Label: Wagram
- Producer: Loïc Barrouk

Caravan Palace chronology
Caravan Palace (2008)	Panic (2012)

Singles from Caravan Palace
- 1. "Jolie Coquine" Released: 2008; 2. "Suzy" Released: 24 February 2009

Caravan Palace is the debut studio album by the electro swing group Caravan Palace, released on 20 October 2008. The album performed best in the band's native France where it reached a peak chart position of No. 11 in August 2009, and remained on the French albums chart for 68 consecutive weeks. In 2009. It was awarded a gold certification from the Independent Music Companies Association which indicated sales of at least 100,000 copies in Europe.

== Track listing ==
No.	Title	Length
1.	"Dragons"	4:05
2.	"Star Scat"	3:50
3.	"Ended With the Night"	5:00
4.	"Jolie Coquine"	3:46
5.	"Oooh"	1:49
6.	"Suzy"	4:07
7.	"Je M'Amuse"	3:34
8.	"Violente Valse"	3:35
9.	"Brotherswing"	3:42
10.	"L'Envol"	3:46
11.	"Sofa"	0:51
12.	"Bambous"	3:14
13.	"Lazy Place"	3:57
14.	"We Can Dance"	4:23
15.	"La Caravane"	5:05
Total length:		54:44

== Personnel ==
- Hugues Payen – violin
- Arnaud Vial – guitar
- Charles Delaporte – double bass
- Camille Chapelière – clarinet
- Antoine Toustou – trombone, drum machine
- Aurélien "Ariel T" Trigo – guitar, DJ
- Colotis Zoe – vocalist
