= Caravan Palace =

French electro swing band

- Caravan Palace at the 9:30 Club in Washington DC (2025)

Background information
- Origin: Paris, France
- Genres: Electro swing; electronic; jazz; pop
- Years active: 2008–present
- Labels: MVKA; Le Plan Recordings; Lone Diggers; Café de la Danse
- Members: Zoé Colotis; Arnaud "Vial" de Bosredon; Charles Delaporte; Paul-Marie Barbier; Martin Berlugue; Lucas Saint-Cricq; Diego "Odd Sweet" Dolciami
- Past members: Camille Chapelière; Hugues Payen; Victor Raimondeau; Antoine Toustou
- Website: www.caravanpalace.com

Caravan Palace is a French electro-swing band based in Paris. The band's influences include Django Reinhardt, Vitalic, Lionel Hampton, and Daft Punk. The band released their debut studio album, Caravan Palace, on the Wagram label in October 2008. The record charted in Switzerland, Belgium, and France, where it reached a peak position of number 11.

== History ==
The band formed as a three-piece when they were recruited to compose the soundtrack for a silent adult film. Loïc Barrouk took an interest in the project and booked the band a recording studio and a series of gigs. More performers were required for the live concerts; current band members Zoé Colotis & Paul-Marie Barbier, as well as former members Camille Chapelière and Antoine Toustou were found after searching on MySpace.

The band became popular on the internet after releasing a number of demos and promo singles. From 2006 to 2007, they spent a year touring around France, and their first festival appearance came at the Django Reinhardt Jazz Festival in 2007. Following this emergence, the group were signed by the Paris-based Wagram Music record label. They spent the next year recording material for their debut studio album.

On 20 October 2008, the self-titled Caravan Palace was released, preceded by the single "Jolie Coquine". The album received praise for its traditional jazz inclinations, and placed in a number of European albums charts. In Switzerland, the album reached number 72 and in Belgium it achieved a position of 42. The album performed best in the band's native France where it attained a peak position of 11 in August 2009, and remained on the French albums chart for 68 consecutive weeks. It ended up selling over 150,000 copies worldwide The band released their second official single, "Suzy", on 24 February 2009.

On 3 October 2011, the band released an EP titled Clash, featuring the songs "12 juin 3049" and "Clash", as well as four remixes of the latter. The band's second album, Panic, was released on 5 March 2012. Their third album, <|°_°|> (also known as Robot Face or Robot), was released on 16 October 2015.

Animated video for "Lone Digger" (audio muted due to copyright restrictions)

In 2015, they appeared on Later... with Jools Holland on 27 and 30 October, and on The Jonathan Ross Show on 31 October. Subsequently, they appeared on Jools' Annual Hootenanny on 31 December 2016 – 1 January 2017 singing a cover of "Black Betty" and "Lone Digger".

Their fourth album, Chronologic, was released on 30 August 2019, it includes the singles "Miracle", "About You", "Plume", and "Supersonics". Their fifth album, Gangbusters Melody Club, was released on 1 March 2024 after four singles: "MAD", "Reverse", "Mirrors", and "Fool", released during the latter half of 2023 and early 2024. In 2026 the band worked together with Fumi games to make a music video based on their game Mouse: P.I. for Hire, animated by Brikk.

== Band members ==
Current

- Arnaud "Vial" de Bosredon – composition, production, guitar, vocals (2008–present)
- Charles Delaporte – composition, production, bass, vocals (2008–present)
- Zoé Colotis – vocals (2008–present)
- Romain Theret – keyboards, percussion, vibraphone (2024–present)
- Odd Sweet – dancer (2020–present)
- ZAYKA (also known as Martin Berluge) – trombone (2020–present)
- Lucas Saint-Cricq – saxophone, violin, clarinet (2020–present)

Former

- Hugues Payen – violin, vocals (2008–2019)
- Camille Chapelière – saxophone, clarinet (2008–2016)
- Victor Raimondeau – saxophone (2019)
- Antoine Toustou – synth programming (2008–2020)
- Paul-Marie Barbier – keyboards, percussion, vibraphone (2011–2024)

Timeline

== Discography ==
Caravan Palace discography
- Studio albums: 5
- Extended plays: 6
- Singles: 20
- Music videos: 12

=== Studio albums ===
List of studio albums, with selected chart positions
Title	Details	Charts					
Title	Details	FRA	BEL	SWI	UK	UK Dance	US Dance
Caravan Palace	Released: 20 October 2008; Format: CD, digital download, streaming, LP; Label: Wagram	11	42	72	—	—	16
Panic	Released: 5 March 2012; Format: CD, digital download, streaming, LP; Label: Café de la Danse, Le Plan Recordings, Wagram	20	74	43	97	—	—
<|°_°|>	Released: 16 October 2015; Format: CD, digital download, streaming, LP; Label: Café de la Danse, Le Plan Recordings, Wagram, MVKA,	51	101	57	64	6	3
Chronologic	Released: 30 August 2019; Format: CD, digital download, streaming, LP, Cassette; Label: Lone Diggers, Le Plan Recordings, MVKA	58	—	82	63	—	6
Gangbusters Melody Club	Release Date: 1 March 2024; Format: CD, digital download, streaming, LP; Label: Lone Diggers, Le Plan Recordings, MVKA,	125	—	—	44	10	—

=== Extended plays ===
List of EPs
Title	Album details	Album
Clash	Released: 2011 (FR), 27 February 2012 (US); Format: Digital download; Label: Wagram	Panic
Wonderland	Released: 20 May 2016; Format: Digital download; Label: Wagram	<|°_°|>
Miracle	Released: 28 February 2019; Format: Digital download; Label: Lone Diggers	Chronologic
Moonshine	Released: 7 May 2020; Format: Digital download; Label: Lone Diggers	Chronologic

=== Singles ===
List of singles, with selected chart positions, showing year released and album name
Title	Year	Peak chart positions	Album
Title	Year	FRA	Album
"Jolie Coquine"	2008	192	Caravan Palace
"Suzy"	2009	—	Caravan Palace
"Milkshake"	2009	—	Non-album singles
"Chocolate"	2009	—	Non-album singles
"Kleptomanie"	2009	—	Non-album singles
"Clash"	2012	—	Panic
"Rock It for Me"	2012	—	Panic
"Dramophone"	2012	—	Panic
"Comics"	2015	—	<|°_°|>
"Lone Digger"	2015	144	<|°_°|>
"Aftermath" / "Mighty"	2016	—	<|°_°|>
"Wonderland"	2016	—	<|°_°|>
"Black Betty"	2017	—	Non-album single
"Miracle"	2019	—	Chronologic
"About You"	2019	—	Chronologic
"Plume"	2019	—	Chronologic
"Supersonics"	2019	—	Chronologic
"Pluma"	2020	—	Non-album singles
"Supersonics (Out Come the Freaks Edit)"	2020	—	Non-album singles
"MAD"	2023	—	Gangbusters Melody Club
"Reverse"	2023	—	Gangbusters Melody Club
"Mirrors"	2024	—	Gangbusters Melody Club
"Fool"	2024	—	Gangbusters Melody Club
"City Cook"	2025	—	Gangbusters Melody Club
"Good Mouse (From the MOUSE: P.I. FOR HIRE Soundtrack)"	2026	—	Non-album singles

=== Mixes ===
List of officially released mixes
Title	Year
Panic in The USA	2013
Super Summer Mix	2013
Snow Mix	2013
60 Minute Mix	2017
Chill with Caravan Palace	2020
Dusty House Mix	2025

=== Remixes ===
List of remixes released by Caravan Palace
Title	Year
"Clash (Flash Remix by Charles)"	2011
"Clash (Jupiter Remix)"	2011
"Clash (Slash Remix by Shiny Mob)"	2011
"Clash (Splash Remix by Hugo)"	2011
"Dramophone (Swing Flappers Remix)"	2011
"Beatophone (Club Mix)"	2013
"Wonderland (Vendredi Remix)"	2016
"Miracle (Fakear Remix)"	2019
"Miracle (Boogie Belgique Remix)"	2019
"Moonshine (Bakermat Remix)"	2020
"Moonshine (Ténéré Remix)"	2020
"Moonshine (Hugo Payen Remix)"	2020
"Moonshine (Bakermat Extended Remix)"	2020
"Raccoons (Gaudi & Don Letts Remix)"	2024
"Reverse (IAMNOBODI Remix)"	2024
"Avalanches (DARGZ Remix)"	2024
"City Cook (Crackazat Remix [Extended])"	2025

List of titles remixed by Caravan Palace
Title	Year
"Bitchcraft (Caravan Palace Remix)" – Drake Bell	2014
"Pack Up The Louie (Caravan Palace Remix)" – Caro Emerald	2014

=== Music videos ===
Year	Song	Director(s)	Album
2008	''Jolie Coquine''	Caravan Palace	Caravan Palace
2009	"Suzy"	Bechir "Jiwee" Jouini	Caravan Palace
2012	"Rock It for Me"	Guillaume Cassuto, Ugo Gattoni, Jeremy Pires	Panic
2012	"Dramophone"	Frédéric de Ponchara	Panic
2015	"Comics"	Soandsau	<|°_°|>
2015	"Mighty"	None*	<|°_°|>
2015	"Lone Digger"	Double Ninja	<|°_°|>
2016	"Wonderland"	Kelsi Phung	<|°_°|>
2016	"Midnight"	Andy Collet	<|°_°|>
2019	"Miracle"	Double Ninja	Chronologic
2019	"Plume"	Romain Cieutat	Chronologic
2020	"Moonshine"	Double Ninja	Chronologic
2020	"Supersonics"	Bechir "Jiwee" Jouini	Chronologic
2021	"Melancolia"	Alina Popescu	Chronologic
2023	''MAD''	Everfresh	Gangbusters Melody Club
2024	''Mirrors''	Everfresh	Gangbusters Melody Club
2025	"City Cook"	Double Ninja	Gangbusters Melody Club
2026	"Good Mouse"	Matthew Reeve	Non-album singles

* Unlike the band's other videos, the video for "Mighty" is a compilation of video clips of robots from across science fiction and, as such, has no single director.
