= Gangbusters Melody Club =

Studio album by Caravan Palace
- Released: 1 March 2024
- Recorded: 2011–2012, 2014–2015, 2020, 2022, 2023 (majority)
- Studio: Verywise Studio (Paris, France)
- Genre: Electronic; electro swing; house; synth-pop
- Length: 43:25
- Label: Lone Digger; Mvka
- Producer: Caravan Palace

Caravan Palace chronology
| Chronologic (2019) | Gangbusters Melody Club (2024) |

Singles from Gangbusters Melody Club
- 1. "MAD" Released: 19 October 2023; 2. "Reverse" Released: 30 November 2023; 3. "Mirrors" Released: 5 January 2024; 4. "Fool" Released: 9 February 2024; 5. "City Cook" Released: 13 March 2025

Gangbusters Melody Club is the fifth studio album by the electro swing group Caravan Palace, released on 1 March 2024. It peaked at 62 in the Official Scottish Albums Chart in the same month.

== Track listing ==
All tracks are written by Arnaud de Bosredon.

Gangbusters Melody Club track listing
| No. | Title | Length |
|---|---|---|
| 1. | "MAD" | 2:47 |
| 2. | "Mirrors" | 3:41 |
| 3. | "81 Special" | 3:55 |
| 4. | "Raccoons" | 3:28 |
| 5. | "Avalanches" | 4:08 |
| 6. | "Reverse" | 4:02 |
| 7. | "Fool (feat. Ella Washington)" | 3:30 |
| 8. | "Spirits" | 3:54 |
| 9. | "Blonde Dynamite" | 3:50 |
| 10. | "Portobello" | 2:41 |
| 11. | "City Cook" | 3:23 |
| 12. | "Villa Rose" | 4:04 |
| Total length: | | 43:25 |

== Personnel ==
Caravan Palace

- Paul-Marie Barbier – piano (tracks 1, 4–7, 12) percussion (all tracks) vibraphone (tracks 5, 8, 11)
- Martin Berlugue – trombone (tracks 1–3, 6, 9–10, 12)
- Zoé Colotis – lead vocals (tracks 1–6, 8–), chorus vocals (1, 3, 5)
- Arnaud "Vial" de Bosredon – drum programming, synthesizer, mixing (all tracks); electric guitar (tracks 1, 2, 4–6, 10–12), chorus vocals (1, 5, 8); alto saxophone (6), acoustic guitar (7, 8), saxophone (7), composer (all tracks)
- Charles Delaporte – drum programming, synthesizer (all tracks); keyboard bass (tracks 1–3, 5, 8–12); electric bass (4, 6), background vocals (6), contrabass (12)
- Lucas Saint-Cricq – baritone saxophone, tenor saxophone (tracks 1, 3–9); alto saxophone (3–9), violin (tracks 2–6, 11–12)
- Luis Calderon – mastering, piano – (track 7), synthesizer – (track 6)

Additional contributors

- Aurélien – editing
- Robin Mansanti – chorus vocals (tracks 5, 8)
- Ella Washington – lead vocals (track 7)

Former Members (2011–2021)

- Hugues Payen – violin (track 4)
- Camile Chapelière – saxophone (track 10)

== Charts ==
| Chart (2024) | Peak position |
|---|---|
| Belgian Albums (Ultratop Wallonia) | — |
| French Albums (SNEP) | 125 |
| Swiss Albums (Schweizer Hitparade) | — |
| UK Dance Albums (OCC) | 10 |
| UK Independent albums (OCC) | 15 |
