= Lone Digger =

Song by the Caravan Palace

Single by Caravan Palace

from the album <|°_°|>
- B-side: None: Radio Edit And Instrumental; "Comics" "Wonderland"
- Released: September 15, 2015
- Genre: EDM; disco; electropop; electro swing
- Length: 3:50

Caravan Palace singles chronology
| "Comics" (2015) | "Lone Digger" (2015) | "Mighty (feat. JFTH)" / "Aftermath" (2016) |

"Lone Digger" is a song by the French electro swing group Caravan Palace. It was released in 2015 as a promotional CD single on Wagram Music, and on digital download by Wagram Music and Mvka Music on September 18, 2015. It is the second single from their third studio album <|°_°|> (also known as Robot Face or Robot).

The song was featured in the 2022 Disney movie Strange World.

== Track listing ==
| No. | Title | Length |
|---|---|---|
| 1. | "Lone Digger" | 3:50 |
| 2. | "Lone Digger (Radio Edit)" | 3:10 |
| 3. | "Lone Digger (Instrumental)" | 3:50 |

Digital download

| No. | Title | Length |
|---|---|---|
| 1. | "Lone Digger" | 3:50 |

Promotional CD Single

| No. | Title | Length |
|---|---|---|
| 1. | "Lone Digger" | 3:50 |
| 2. | "Comics" | 3:32 |
| 3. | "Wonderland" | 3:12 |

== Music video ==
Video for the track (audio muted due to copyright restrictions)

On 12 November 2015, an animated music video was released for "Lone Digger", directed by Double Ninja and produced by Cumulus. The video, which depicts a violent fight in a strip club staffed and patronized by various anthropomorphic animals, has over 400 million views on YouTube.

== Charts ==
| Chart | Peak position |
|---|---|
| French Albums (SNEP) | 144 |

== Certifications ==
| Region | Certification | Certified units/sales |
|---|---|---|
| Poland (ZPAV) | Platinum | 50,000^{‡} |
| United States (RIAA) | Platinum | 1,000,000^{‡} |
^{‡} Sales+streaming figures based on certification alone.
