= Panic (Caravan Palace album) =

Studio album by Caravan Palace
- Released: March 5, 2012
- Genres: Electro swing; swing; jazz; breakbeat
- Length: 51:08
- Label: Wagram
- Producer: Caravan Palace

Caravan Palace chronology
Caravan Palace (2008)	Panic (2012)	<|°_°|> (2015)

Singles from Panic
- 1. "Clash" Released: October 3, 2011; 2. "Rock It for Me" Released: 2012; 3. "Dramophone" Released: 2012

Panic is the second studio album by the electro swing group Caravan Palace, released on 5 March 2012 by Wagram Music.

== Track listing ==
No.	Title	Length
1.	"Queens"	4:06
2.	"Maniac"	4:11
3.	"The Dirty Side of the Street"	3:39
4.	"12 Juin 3049"	3:23
5.	"Rock It for Me"	3:12
6.	"Clash"	4:13
7.	"Newbop"	2:51
8.	"Glory of Nelly"	3:45
9.	"Dramophone"	3:24
10.	"Cotton Heads"	3:38
11.	"Panic"	4:05
12.	"Pirates"	3:20
13.	"Beatophone"	3:54
14.	"Sydney"	3:32
Total length:		51:08

Panic in the USA Bonus tracks
No.	Title	Length
15.	"Dramophone (Swing Flappers Edit)"	3:33
16.	"Clash (Live in Paris)"	4:24
17.	"Clash (Jupiter Remix)"	5:02
18.	"Clash (Slash Remix by Shiny Mob)"	3:09
Total length:		67:16

== Personnel ==
- Hugues Payen - violin
- Arnaud Vial - guitar
- Charles Delaporte - double bass
- Camille Chapelière - clarinet
- Antoine Toustou - trombone, drum machine
- Aurélien - guitar, DJ
- Sonia Fernandez Velasco aka Zoé Colotis - vocalist
- Paul Marrie Barbier - piano

== Charts ==
Chart (2012)	Peak position
Belgian Albums (Ultratop Wallonia)	74
French Albums (SNEP)	20
Swiss Albums (Schweizer Hitparade)	43
UK Dance Albums (OCC)	21
UK Independent albums (OCC)	14
