= Sin City (disambiguation) =

Sin City is a series of graphic novels by Frank Miller.

Sin City, Sin Cities, or City of Sin may also refer to:

== Places ==
- Sin City (description), a nickname for a city that caters to various vices
- Las Vegas, which is sometimes referred to as "Sin City" due to being a global hub for gambling and debauchery
- Lynn, Massachusetts, described in an old rhyme as, "Lynn, Lynn, the city of sin, you'll never go out, the way you went in"

== Arts, entertainment, and media ==
=== Films ===
- City of Sin, the 1963 release of The Scavengers (1959 film)
- Sin City (film), a 2005 film based on Miller's graphic novels
- Sin City: A Dame to Kill For, a 2014 sequel to the 2005 film

=== Literature ===
- Sin City, a 2002 Harold Robbins novel
- Sin City, an autobiographical book by the British journalist Ralph Shaw

=== Music ===
==== Albums ====
- City of Sin (album), 2020 album by the Dutty Moonshine Big Band
- Sin City (Genitorturers album), a 1998 album by Genitorturers
- Sin City (soundtrack), a soundtrack for the 2005 film Sin City
- Sin City (The Flying Burrito Brothers album), a 1992 album by The Flying Burrito Brothers
- Sin City The Mixtape, a 2021 mixtape by rapper Ski Mask the Slump God
- City of Sin, a 1994 album by This Picture

==== Songs ====
- "City of Sin" (song), a song by Escape the Fate from the 2010 album Escape the Fate
- "Sin City", a song by AC/DC from the 1978 album Powerage
- "Sin City", a song by Chris de Burgh from the 1974 album Far Beyond These Castle Walls
- "Sin City", a song by Flying Burrito Brothers from the 1969 album The Gilded Palace of Sin
- "Sin City", a song by Upon A Burning Body from the album Red. White. Green.
- "Sin City", a song by Christopher Dotson

=== Television ===
- Sin Cities: A Life Less Ordinary, a British sexually oriented travel television series
- "Sin City" (Supernatural), an episode of the television series Supernatural

== Brands and enterprises ==
- Sin City (studio), an adult film production company

== See also ==
- SimCity
- Sodom and Gomorrah, the sin cities of the Bible
