= Chronologic =

Studio album by Caravan Palace
- Released: 30 August 2019
- Genre: Electronic; jazz; pop
- Length: 35:12
- Label: Lone Diggers; MKVA; Le Plan Recordings

Caravan Palace chronology
<|°_°|> (2015)	Chronologic (2019)	Gangbusters Melody Club (2024)

Singles from Chronologic
- 1. "Miracle" Released: 8 February 2019; 2. "About You" Released: 24 May 2019; 3. "Plume" Released: 28 June 2019; 4. "Supersonics" Released: 16 August 2019; 5. "Moonshine" Released: 2020

Chronologic is the fourth studio album by French electro swing group Caravan Palace, released on 30 August 2019.

== Track listing ==
No.	Title	Length
1.	"Miracle"	3:36
2.	"About You" (featuring Charles X)	3:48
3.	"Moonshine"	3:34
4.	"Melancolia"	4:03
5.	"Plume"	3:05
6.	"Fargo"	1:19
7.	"Waterguns" (featuring Tom Bailey)	3:30
8.	"Leena"	3:45
9.	"Supersonics"	3:21
10.	"Ghosts"	1:28
11.	"April"	3:43
Total length:		35:12

== Personnel ==
- Zoé Colotis - vocalist
- Charles Delaporte - double bass
- Hugues Payen - violin
- Antoine Toustou - trombone
- Arnaud Vial - guitar

== Charts ==
Chart (2019)	Peak position
Belgian Albums (Ultratop Wallonia)	90
French Albums (SNEP)	58
Swiss Albums (Schweizer Hitparade)	82
UK Albums (OCC)	63
UK Independent Albums (OCC)	5
US Top Dance/Electronic Albums (Billboard)	9
US Heatseekers Albums (Billboard)	2
