= Ferdinando Arnò =

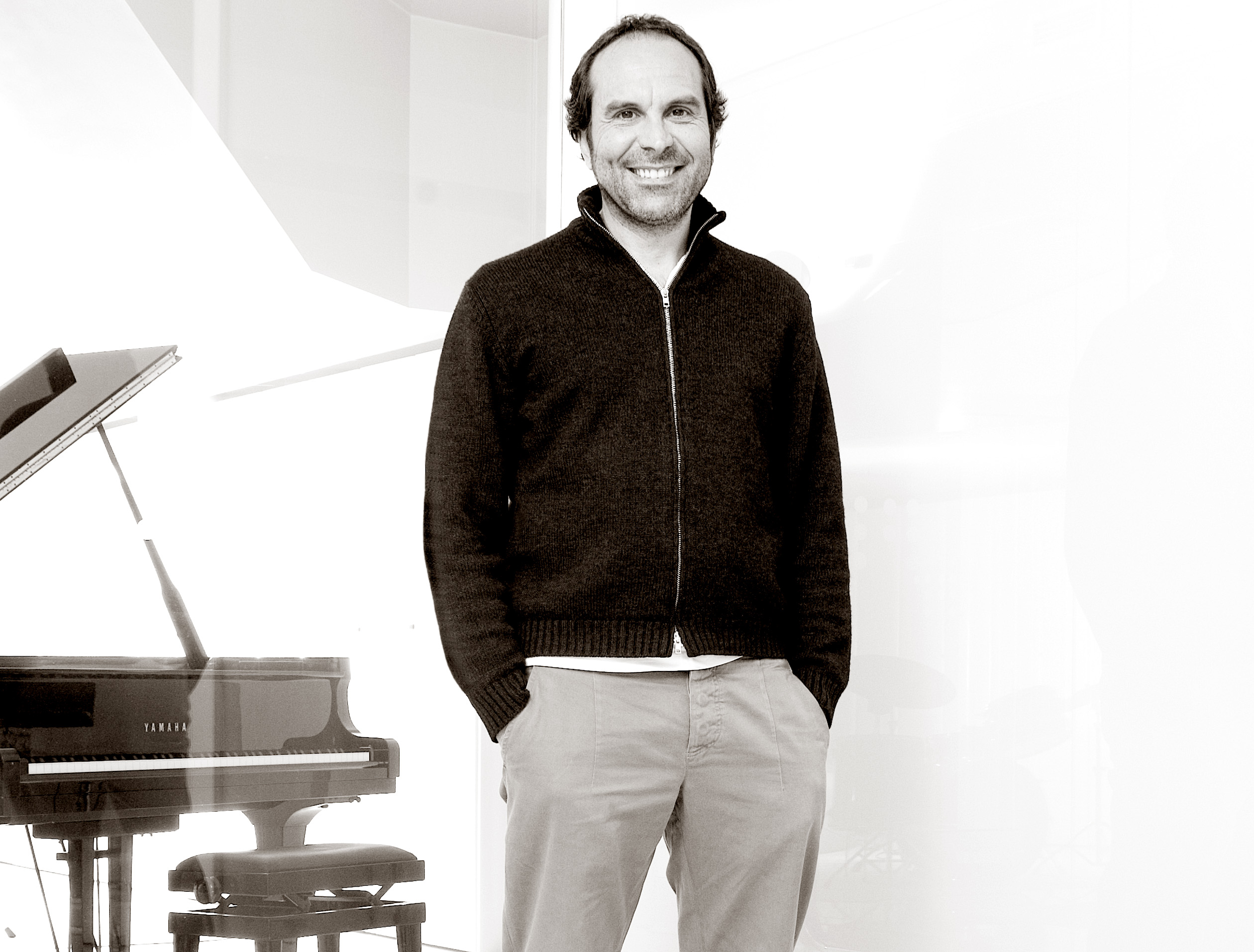

Background information
- Born: Manduria, Italy
- Origin: Apulia and Veneto, Italy; Resides:= Milan, Italy
- Genres: Indie pop, Electronic music, Jazz, Jingles
- Instruments: piano
- Years active: 1980–present
- Labels: quiet, please!

Ferdinando Arnò (born in Manduria, November 29, 1959) is an Italian composer, arranger, producer and the founder of Quiet, please!, a recording studio and production company active in the recording and advertising field.

Ferdinando Arnò studied jazz improvisation at Berklee College of Music in Boston. His teachers were, among others, Gary Burton, John La Porta, Tom McKinley, Charlie Banacos and Phil Wilson. Arnò was involved in jam sessions in Boston with internationally renowned musicians such as Victor Bailey (Weather Report), Tommy Campbell, Bob Gullotti, Ed Schuller, Terri Lyne Carrington, Branford Marsalis and Jeff Watts. When he completed his studies, Arnò received his diploma from Quincy Jones at the graduation ceremony.

On his return to Italy he worked as an arranger and composer for television, doing films, documentaries, program theme songs, variety shows and cartoons. In that same period he arranged and composed songs for Emi, Bmg, Warner (he wrote Il Tempo sung by Ornella Vanoni), and the theater, collaborating with Jerome Savary, Dario Fo and Fiorenzo Carpi.

In the nineties Arnò began composing jingles for TV commercials, an activity that was consolidated in 2000 with the birth of his company quiet, please! Since then, he has worked on thousands of TV ad campaigns, doing new arrangements or composing tailor-made songs, from the ironic rap Ga el Suv (Skoda Yeti) to the Gran Soleil smash for Ferrero and the remake of Here Comes the Sun by George Harrison for Allianz.

Ferdinando Arnò has received many honors and recognition for his original music and catalog tracks selected for commercials, starting with ten Key Awards (Editorial Media Key group) that he won between 2004 and 2018. Among these the Excellence Key Award that his label quiet, please! received in 2015 as the best production company.

In 2004, the music for the Telecom commercial "Gandhi" (winner of the Bronze Lion at Cannes) was voted Best Ever Forever Song by the Key Award jury (the song used was Sacrifice by Lisa Gerrard and Pieter Bourke). Four years earlier, in 2000, Arnò's music for BMW won the Mezzo Minuto d'Oro award.

Among the countless campaigns that Arnò has done, there are the international TV ads for Barilla (Roger Federer and Chef Davide Oldani), Tim, Fernet Branca, Crodino Twist, Giorgio Armani "Frames of Life", Averna, Aperol, Vodafone, Fastweb, Poste Italiane, several commercials for the promotion of Expo 2015, Nike, Esselunga, Nespresso, Peugeot, Alfa Romeo, Ariston, Parmigiano Reggiano, Gran Cereale, Coca-Cola, Tic Tac, Sky Christmas "Toy" (with Robin Williams) Sky Mondiali, Sky Sport, Sky Restart and Sky Great TV.

Through his work creating music for TV ads, Arnò has collaborated with big name directors to direct the commercials, from Gabriele Salvatores and Michel Gondry to Tarsem Singh, Spike Lee, Matteo Garrone and Emanuele Crialese.

Arnò also selected the music (The Magnificent Seven by The Clash) for the Campari short film directed by Oscar winner Paolo Sorrentino and for the Tim commercial, known worldwide for the moves of German dancer Sven Otten.

Through his work in advertising, in 2006 Arnò heard the voice of Malika Ayane who in the following year interpreted Soul Waver for the Saab 9-3 ad campaign (the song was also used in the American TV series One Tree Hill).

Becoming the producer of the artist, Arnò worked with Malika Ayane on her single Feeling Better and her debut album Malika Ayane (Ferdinando was not only her producer, but also the composer and author of most of the songs on the album). In 2009 Arnò accompanied Malika Ayane on piano at the 59th Sanremo Song Festival with the song Come Foglie written by Giuliano Sangiorgi and produced and arranged by Ferdinando.

In 2010 Arnò produced Malika Ayane's second album called Grovigli, which also featured great artists such as Paolo Conte, Alexander Bălănescu, Vince Mendoza (Bjork, Joni Mitchell, Gregory Porter) and Cesare Cremonini. The single from the Grovigli album, Ricomincio da qui, was a hit at the Sanremo Festival 2010 and on the radio. Always in the 2010 Arnò collaborated on several recording projects with Andrea Bocelli and Ennio Morricone. In 2011 he conducted the Sanremo Festival orchestra for two songs for which he was also the producer: Tre Colori by Tricarico and Follia d'Amore performed by Raphael Gualazzi, winners of the New Proposals section and the Mia Martini Critics' Award.

Some of Arnò's compositions are part of the soundtracks of A Time for Dancing by Peter Gilbert, Generazione Mille Euro by Massimo Venier and Letters To Juliet by Gary Winick. For the soundtrack of La prima cosa bella by Paolo Virzì, Arnò rearranged the homonymous song sung by Malika Ayane.

The year 2013 marked the debut EP of Common Mama, the band formed by Arnò featuring the magnetic voice of Jon Kenzie, a busker from Manchester discovered in the London Underground. The single Meant from the start followed and took third place at the International Songwriting Competition in 2014.

Live@quiet, please! - Creativity in real time is the title of the format that was broadcast on Sky Art in 2015 and 2016 and recorded in Arnò's studios. The aim of the program was to capture the creative moment of recording. Guests included Jack Savoretti, Devendra Banhart, Melanie De Biasio, le CocoRosie, Selah Sue and Benjamin Clementine.

In 2016 Arnò composed Music For Radura, the soundtrack for an installation by Stefano Boeri designed as a decompression space within the city and housed in the Cortile della Farmacia of the Università Statale of Milan. Belgian vocalist Melanie De Biasio, Giorgio Cocilovo (Moog guitar) and Marco Decimo (cello) performed the five pieces.

In 2017, during Milan Design Week, Arnò presented his composition Entrainment (produced by the Triennale), a pagan mantra born from the idea of using music to synchronize with people nearby and with everything around us. The performance took place at the Triennale Theater. In November 2018 Entrainment was performed at the Museum of Science and Technology in Milan.

"Dream On Me" is the title of the single that Arnò co-wrote with American singer-songwriter Joan As Police Woman and was released in 2018. The soul pop track (accompanied by a video clip directed by Jacopo Benassi) was a hit on streaming platforms.

In November 2018 Electa published Ferdinando Arnò Entrainment, the book written by music critic Gianni Poglio that reveals the many facets of the artist's art and musical sensitivity. The story is also told through artistic photos taken in the quiet, please! studios inspired in their design by the setting of Stanley Kubrick's cult film 2001: A Space Odyssey.

In early 2019 "O Filho Do Recluso" was released: the traditional Portuguese song was arranged by Arnò and performed by Maro, a talented young singer with an intense, poignant voice. The song was featured in a dream-like, visionary art-video by the Japanese director and fashion photographer Karina Taira. In March 2019 the new Common Mama single You're My Life was released. In its review, Panorama.it called it "The art of pop in three minutes."

The summer of 2019 is made by the funk vibrations of Go For Gold (with Dede and Javier Starks).

My Yiddishe Momme/The Click Song, published on May 18, 2020, produced and arranged by Arnò, is a reinterpretation of an a cappella version sung by Mama Africa in 2008, linked in medley with another piece of African tradition, The Click Song. "We created an instant song thanks to an intuition of Caterina Caselli, linked to Miriam by a solid friendship" says the producer and composer. On June 19 What Love was released: a single written and produced by Arnò and recorded between Zimbabwe (with the contribution of Isaac and Daniel Gonora and the Zimbabwe Kids Choir), Chicago, Los Angeles and Milan. Among the musicians involved were the jazz legend Pharoah Sanders, Angel Bat Dawid, B'Rael Ali Thunder and a team of session men including Paolo Costa, Giorgio Cocilovo, Daniele Comoglio, and Luana Heredia.

There Was An Angel, present on all streaming platforms since June 26, is the song that captures the encounter between the soul vibes of Samora Pinderhughes and the urban flow of Precious Ebony, leading exponent of the avant-garde Queer Ballroom Scene in New York.
