= First and Third Trinity Boat Club May Ball =

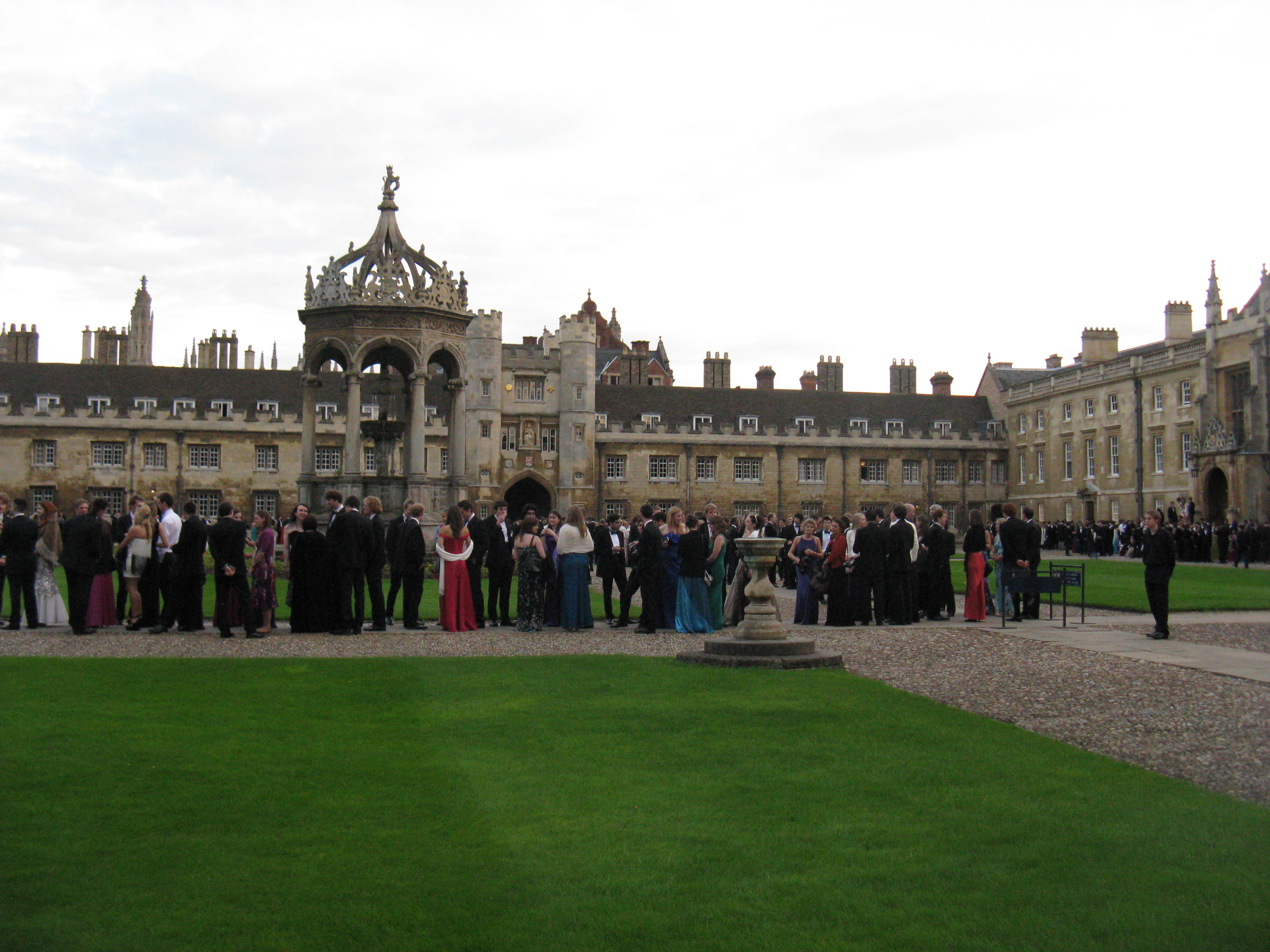
Queuing in Trinity College's Great Court at the beginning of the 2012 May Ball

The First and Third Trinity Boat Club May Ball, informally known as Trinity May Ball, is an end-of-year party held annually during the month of June at Trinity College, University of Cambridge. It is notable as the first May Ball ever held in Cambridge. It originates from a celebration of the First and Third Trinity Boat Club, after which the Ball is named, for their win in the 1838 May Bumps: this consisted in a night of heavy drinking at a local pub, the Hoop Inn. Since the bumps were originally held just before the university exams in May, the name still remains traditionally even if the ball has been moved to the subsequent month, on the Monday of May week. The first official May Ball in Trinity College's grounds was actually held in 1866, and the tradition rapidly spread to the other colleges. The event takes place every year since then, but it was cancelled in 1910 due to King Edward VII's death and between 1939 and 1945 during the Second World War. It was also cancelled in 2020 due to the Covid-19 pandemic.

The ball's dress code is white tie preferred but black tie accepted and the event usually lasts from 9 o'clock in the evening to 6 o'clock in the morning, ending with a Survivors’ photo. Highlights of the occasion include champagne served all night long from an ice-filled punt, oysters and a fireworks display.

Over the years, Trinity May Ball has hosted performances of several famous acts including:

- Elvis Costello and The Attractions
- Pixie Lott and the Vengaboys (2012)
- Cascada (2011)
- Alphabeat and Wheatus (2010)

The current Presidents of the Trinity May Ball are Ryan Tam and Pavit Kaur.

The Ball has also generated some controversy due to its position as one of the most expensive balls in Cambridge, at £410 for two in 2018 making it the first, jointly with St Johns', to exceed £200 per head.

== Bibliography ==
- "Trinity May Ball". 2018. (official web site)
