= June Event =

June Events are alternatives to May Balls held by some Cambridge colleges. They typically differ by being shorter in duration and being much more affordable, with may balls at Homerton College having twice the budget on average in comparison to their June Events

== Alternation ==
Some colleges chose to alternate between a May Ball and a June Event each year. Emmanuel College's May Ball is held in May Week every other year, with alternate years featuring an Event on Suicide Sunday.

In 2006, members of the college voted in favour of restoring Pembroke College's lost tradition of hosting a May Ball for 2007. In 2008 they will hold another June Event.
