= Dutty Moonshine Big Band =

British electronic dance music band

- Dutty Moonshine at the Cambridge Junction in 2026

Background information
- Origin: Bristol, England
- Genres: Electronic dance music, electroswing, UK bass
- Years active: 2014–present

The Dutty Moonshine Big Band are a British electronic dance music group. In June 2020, their second album, City of Sin, reached number 40 on the UK Albums Chart and number one on the UK Dance Albums Chart.

== Discography ==
=== Albums ===
Year	Title	Record label
2017	Most Wanted	Dutty Moonshine
2023	Villain	Rum Runner Records
2020	City of Sin	Dutty Moonshine
