= Ian Bruce (painter) =

British painter and musician

- Known for: Painter, singer and MC

Ian Bruce (also known as Mr. Bruce) is a painter and the former lead singer in the DJ/MC duo The Correspondents. He is currently the singer of a solo musical project alongside producer Angus Kemp likewise named "Mr. Bruce". Ian Bruce is also known for his creative music videos and eccentric dancing both onstage and in his music videos.

== Biography ==
Ian Bruce was educated at Eton College and Edinburgh College of Art. His degree show included pictures of people in a care home, which were described by The Scotsman as 'lively and sympathetic'. While at Edinburgh, he became MC for a group of DJs called 'Trouble'. However, he said to Leeds University Online Student Magazine, that by the time he finished at Edinburgh he was looking for something different, and that he felt that his "insistence on wearing a three piece suit for gigs was a little incongruous with the general vibe."

In 2009 he was selected as one of the Courvoisier 'Future 500' people expected to be a success in their various fields.

== Painting ==
Bruce's primary interest is in portraiture, and he has painted subjects including pupils at Eton College, and a portrait of Sebastian Horsley. In 2009, he also began a project to paint portraits over skype video-chat, giving him the ability to take commissions from people living abroad. He has held exhibitions in London and Edinburgh including a collaboration with Rose Davey, and a show in the Cosa Gallery in Notting Hill.

== The Correspondents ==
Bruce was also the lead singer and MC of DJ/MC duo The Correspondents, described by the Evening Standard as 'the kings of hip-hop swing' and by the Hounslow Chronicle as having developed 'a reputation for setting parties alight'. Bruce's on-stage charisma and wild dancing is often commented on by commentators and reviewers of his shows.

The Correspondents supported and played alongside artists such as Lily Allen and Basement Jaxx and played at major festivals such as WOMAD, Glastonbury and Secret Garden Party. Although Bruce prefers to avoid heavy promotion and allow people to gently discover his work for themselves, The Correspondents developed a sizeable cult following. They were listed by the Daily Telegraph's Lucy Jones as one of the 'Top Ten Highlights of Glastonbury' in 2010.

The Correspondents were retired in late 2020 following the unexpected passing of Bruce's longtime bandmate and producer Tim "Chucks" Cole. Bruce continues to produce new music under an independent name.
