= Robot Face =

<|°_°|>

Studio album by Caravan Palace
- Released: 16 October 2015
- Genres: Electronic; electro swing
- Length: 39:15
- Labels: Café de la danse; Wagram Music; MKVA; Le Plan Recordings

Caravan Palace chronology
| Panic (2012) | <|°_°|> (2015) | Chronologic (2019) |

Singles from <|°_°|>
- 1. "Comics" Released: 22 June 2015; 2. "Lone Digger" Released: 18 September 2015; 3. "Aftermath" / "Mighty" Released: 27 May 2016; 4. "Wonderland" Released: 14 June 2016; 5. "Midnight" Released: 16 November 2016

<|°_°|> (also known as Robot Face or Robot) is the third studio album by the French electro swing group Caravan Palace, released on 16 October 2015.

== Track listing ==
| No. | Title | Length |
|---|---|---|
| 1. | "Lone Digger" | 3:49 |
| 2. | "Comics" | 3:32 |
| 3. | "Mighty" (featuring JFTH) | 3:21 |
| 4. | "Aftermath" | 3:05 |
| 5. | "Wonderland" | 3:10 |
| 6. | "Tattoos" | 3:27 |
| 7. | "Midnight" | 3:25 |
| 8. | "Russian" | 4:01 |
| 9. | "Wonda" | 3:44 |
| 10. | "Human Leather Shoes for Crocodile Dandies" | 4:33 |
| 11. | "Lay Down" | 3:08 |
| Total length: | | 39:15 |

The animated music video for "Lone Digger" (audio muted due to copyright restrictions).

The single "Lone Digger" was certified Platinum by RIAA in May 2023. As of January 2024, the song's animated music video, which depicts a violent fight in a strip club staffed and patronized by various anthropomorphic animals, has over 400 million views on YouTube. The song was also featured in the 2022 Disney movie Strange World.

== Charts ==
| Chart (2015) | Peak position |
|---|---|
| Belgian Albums (Ultratop Wallonia) | 101 |
| French Albums (SNEP) | 51 |
| Swiss Albums (Schweizer Hitparade) | 57 |
| UK Albums (Official Charts) | 64 |
| UK Dance Albums (Official Charts) | 6 |
| UK Independent Albums (Official Charts) | 14 |
| US Top Dance Albums (Billboard) | 3 |
| US Heatseekers Albums (Billboard) | 5 |

In 2016, it was awarded a silver certification from the Independent Music Companies Association which indicated sales of at least 20,000 copies in Europe.
