= May Ball =

Formal dance at Cambridge University

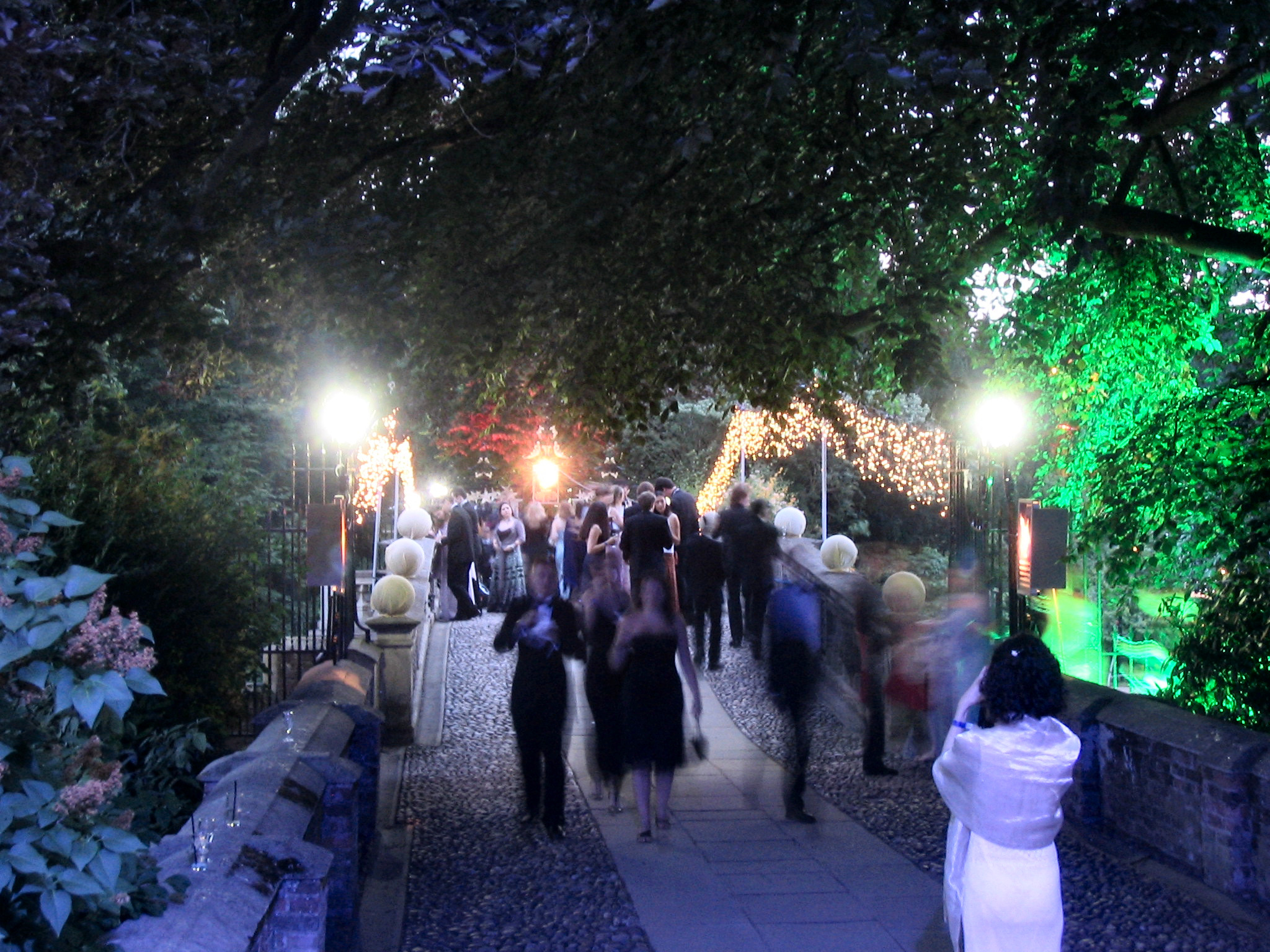
The bridge over the River Cam at Clare College during its 2005 May Ball.

A May Ball is a ball at the end of the academic year that takes place at any of the colleges of the University of Cambridge. They are elaborate and lavish formal affairs, requiring black tie or sometimes white tie, with ticket prices ranging from around £100 to as much as £640 for a pair of dining tickets at Trinity. May Ball budgets (excluding VAT) can exceed £200,000; a report by the student newspaper Varsity in 2016 found that the budget for the 2015 Trinity ball was £286,000. The balls are held in the colleges, starting around from 6-9 p.m. and lasting until well after dawn. "Survivors photographs" are taken of those who last until morning. Other colleges frequently hold winter balls, such as the popular Selwyn Snowball, who recently had acts such Tinchy Stryder and Mumford and Sons headlining.

== History ==
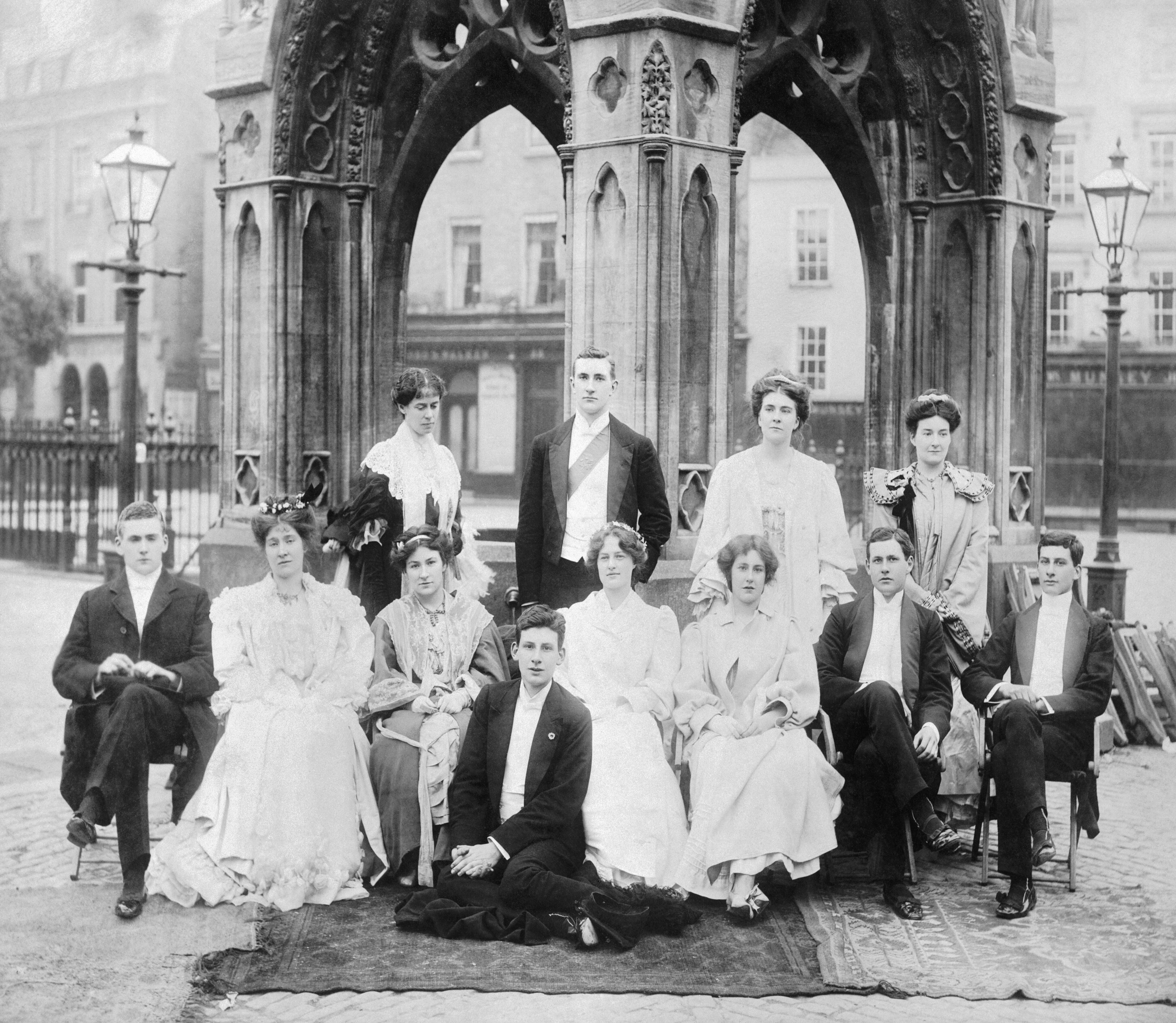
The morning after a May Ball in 1906, including Siegfried Sassoon and his brother Hamo

The tradition of May Balls in Cambridge started in the 1830s with the first official one being the First and Third Trinity Boat Club May Ball in 1866. It is thought they developed from the celebrations surrounding successes in the May Bumps - a set of rowing races which used to take place before the university tripos examinations in May each year. The balls and the other celebrations which make up May Week (such as June Events and garden parties) moved from May to June in 1882, and still take place in June, after examinations, but the name has been retained.

By the 1890s, Emmanuel, King's, and Clare were holding regular balls. St John's first annual ball began in 1888, from which an exclusive '1888 Club' ticket can be obtained by members of the college in honour of the first ball. The first St Catharine's Ball dates from 1929. As the 20th century progressed the formula of the balls varied very little until the 1960s, when students began to question both the cost and perceived stuffiness. Around this time, some colleges began to augment the traditional dance orchestras with rock bands, and by the end of the 1970s the focus of the majority had shifted towards booking rock acts.

As the all-male colleges began to allow female students, the ubiquitous double tickets began to be bought by pairs of students rather than inviting a date from outside of the university, causing a corresponding reduction in ticket sales; in 1991 Sidney Sussex and Downing merged balls, and in 1992 Pembroke cancelled its ball. When in 1993 there were a reported 16,000 tickets available to an undergraduate population of 10,000, Selwyn, Emmanuel, Girton and Peterhouse were all forced to cancel their balls, though Trinity and Magdalene sold out as usual. The solution was for most of the smaller balls to hold events every other year, and by the 2000s only Trinity, St John's, Clare, and Jesus were still holding annual May Balls.

They fell out of popularity with the students in the 1990s, but this trend has since reversed and tickets now sell out in record time. Local businesses also now seek to get involved and the local punting companies put on special night-time tours to allow people to watch the John's and Trinity College firework displays on the Backs from the River Cam - the river usually becomes gridlocked for these evenings during May Week.

== Colleges hosting balls ==
Many Cambridge colleges originally held the balls in May, sometimes in the week preceding year-end exams. Today, they take place in May Week, which usually starts on the second Thursday of June following the end of exams, and which includes Suicide Sunday. The balls operate a strict dress code. Magdalene insists on white tie, which is recommended but not required at Trinity and Peterhouse, while all the others have a minimum of only black tie. Most balls are themed, though Magdalene, Peterhouse, and Trinity's are notable for their lack of a theme. St John's Ball is best known to have a secret theme only revealed on the night of the event, previous themes have included Mythicas and Through the Lens.

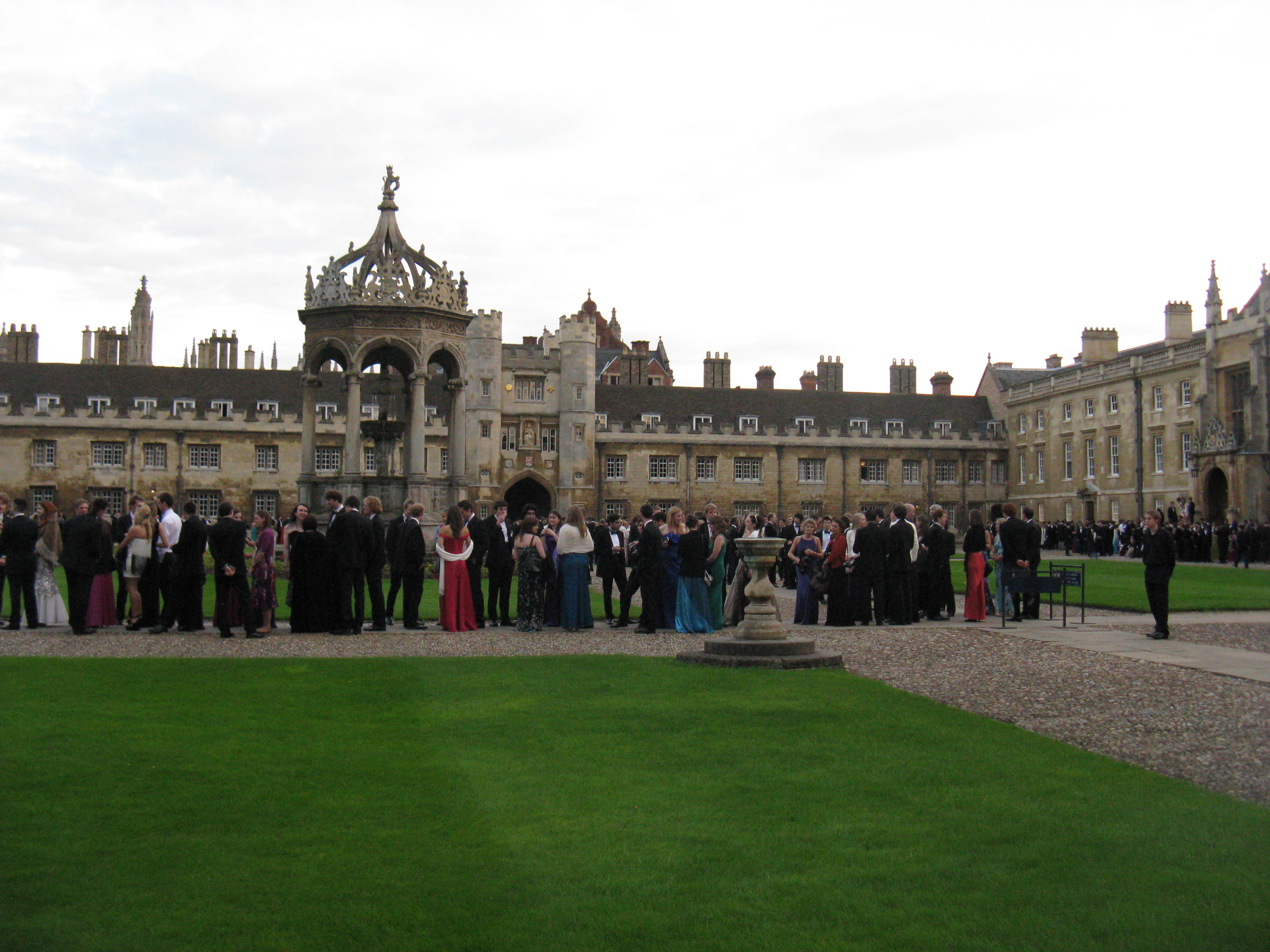
Guests queue to enter First and Third Trinity Boat Club May Ball

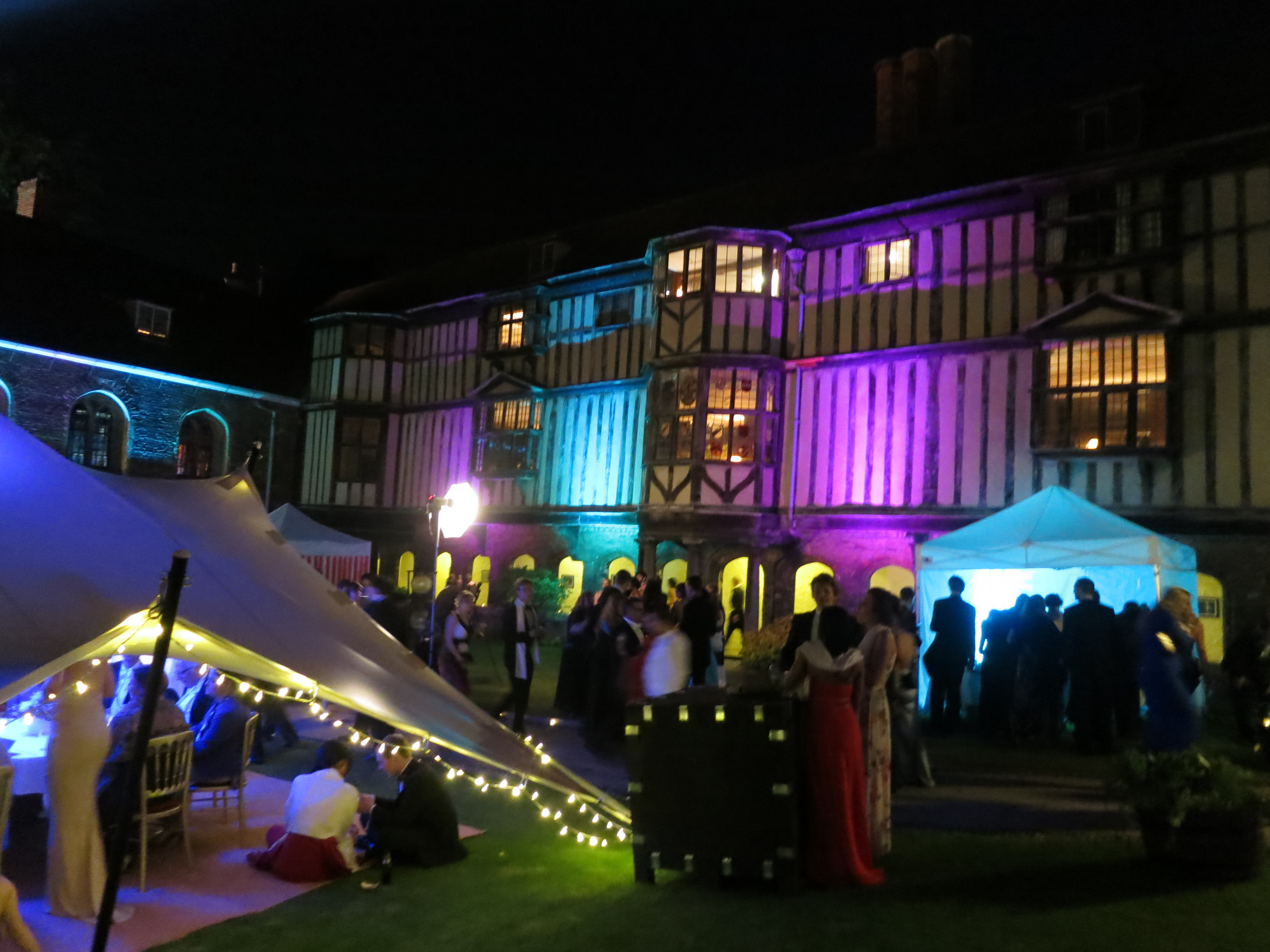
Queens' College held its 100th May Ball in 2013

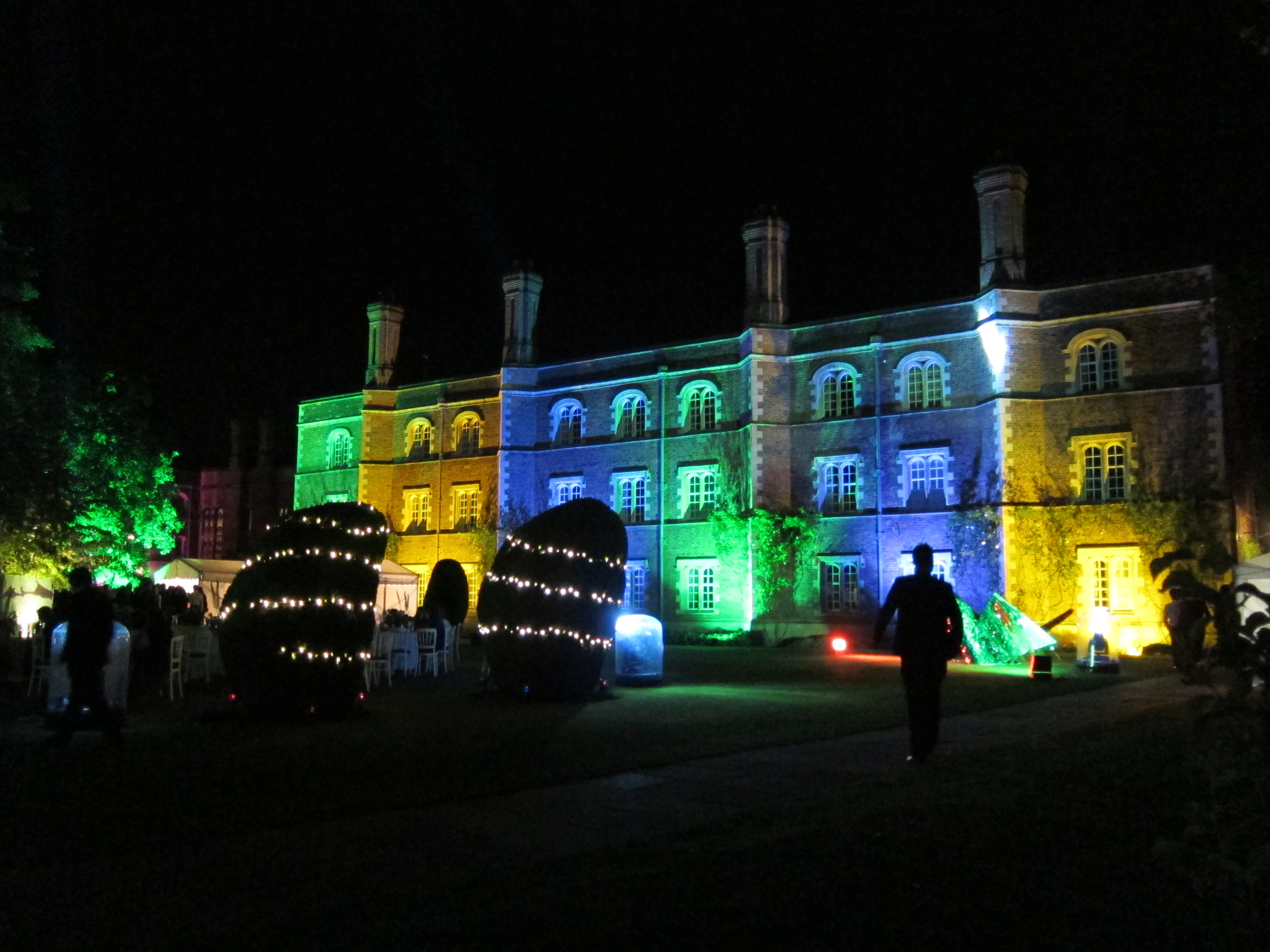
Jesus College May Ball 2012

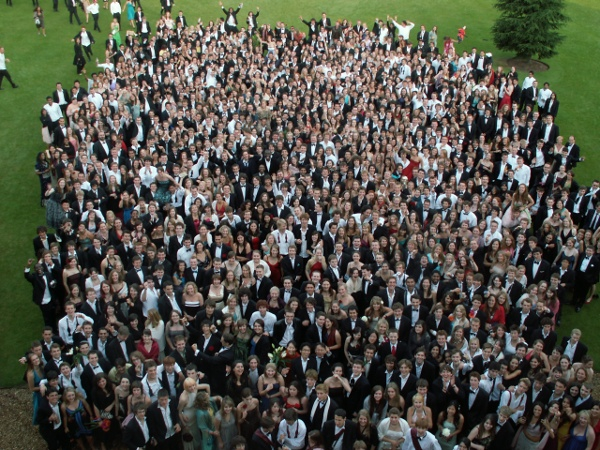
A 'survivors photo' taken around 6am at Jesus College May Ball in 2007.

The First and Third Trinity Boat Club May Ball (named after the boat club, but now run by Trinity College), held on the first Monday of May Week, and the St John's May Ball, held on the first Tuesday. Magdalene and Peterhouse hold white tie balls, with Peterhouse beginning this tradition in 1892. Other May balls are held annually by Clare, Jesus, whose ball is popular amongst first year students, and Queens', whose balls are known for finding soon-to-be-famous up and coming acts (see Performances below). Homerton hosts the first ball of May Week, and is also one of the least expensive black tie balls. St Edmund's hosts the final ball of May Week and is known for attracting finalists and postgraduates. Christ's is known for securing high-profile acts. Trinity, Clare and St John's are situated directly on the River Cam, along the Backs, as are Queens', Magdalene and Trinity Hall. As a result, when several balls are held on the same evening, the river is lit up in different colours from the lights and the fireworks. The latest break from tradition comes from Darwin, who are hosting the first ever plant-based May Ball.

Annual balls are held by Clare, Darwin, Hughes Hall, Homerton, Jesus, St Edmund's, Robinson, Trinity, St John's and Wolfson; while Magdalene, Pembroke, Emmanuel, Corpus Christi, Christ's, Downing, Girton, Gonville and Caius, Newnham, Queens', Sidney Sussex, Selwyn, and St Catharine's hold May Balls every two years.

Most balls have fundamental similarities: all will offer guests a variety of food, entertainment, and a selection of alcoholic drinks. The quality and diversity of all of these vary markedly between different balls. While all claim to offer luxury (and many deliver), some have distinctive hallmarks: Peterhouse is famed for its ferris wheel, Magdalene for its dining, Trinity for its exceptional fireworks and flame display, Clare for its entertainment lineup and St John's for its party atmosphere. Often the balls have overarching themes, sometimes they are fancy dress.

Ball entertainment is a closely guarded secret, not least because of the fear that other committees will 'free ride' by booking an act already booked at another ball and thus have to pay a reduced fee because the band is in Cambridge already, whilst simultaneously devaluing the 'get' by the initial contractor. This was seen in 2010 when Two Door Cinema Club performed at four separate balls. Partly for this reason, ball line-ups are not usually announced until the night of the ball, although they tend to leak out fairly early.

== Ball crashing ==
Colleges with larger May balls pay considerable attention to security and the prevention of ball crashing. With tickets priced at over £150 and in short supply, students often try to gain unauthorized access, climbing high walls, arriving dressed as gorillas pretending to be part of the evening's entertainment, and posing as journalists. Typically, college porters are joined by both student and professional security staff and, at larger balls, police to identify and apprehend the crashers. Some colleges have painted walls with anti-burglar paint, which stains the crashers' clothes with luminous green paint, making it somewhat difficult to blend in. More courageous crashers can be seen swimming down the river Cam holding their clothes in a plastic bag above the water in an attempt to enter colleges from the banks.

As part of the security arrangements, students living in parts of the college and not attending the May Ball are often required either to vacate their rooms or remain in them without leaving overnight, in spite of the inevitable loud music.

== Alternatives ==
Guests watching a fireshow at King's June Event, 2006

Several colleges host a variation on these balls, a June Event. These are cheaper (£60-90), tend to be focused on live music, and frequently have less formal dress codes. Some colleges alternate June events and May balls from year to year. Trinity Hall, Newnham and Wolfson hold June events. In 2018 Wolfson held a May Ball instead. In 2023, Darwin College was the first college at Cambridge to host a vegan ball.

King's holds an annual event known as the "King's Affair" — like the June events it is cheaper and has a reputation for "Beats not Bollinger"; guests are invited to wear any costume they choose. With several different music stages focusing mainly on new DJs, the atmosphere is perhaps more akin to some festivals. The college used to hold a traditional May Ball, but this was banned by the local police after The Stranglers played in the 1970s and caused a crush.

In order to spread the fun throughout the year, a number of colleges have broken with tradition to hold balls at different times, normally either in the winter at the end of Michaelmas term, i.e. the beginning of December, or in spring at the end of Lent term. Selwyn is the only college to hold a yearly winter ball, known as the Snowball; in 2008 Selwyn also held a May Ball to celebrate its 125th Birthday and did so again in 2015 and 2017. Cambridge University Law Society also holds a well-regarded yearly winter ball. Fitzwilliam holds winter balls every two years, the most recent being November 2018. Of the spring balls, that of Girton is held biennially at the end of Lent term in March, whereas Churchill continues to produce an annual ball in the middle of Lent term every February.

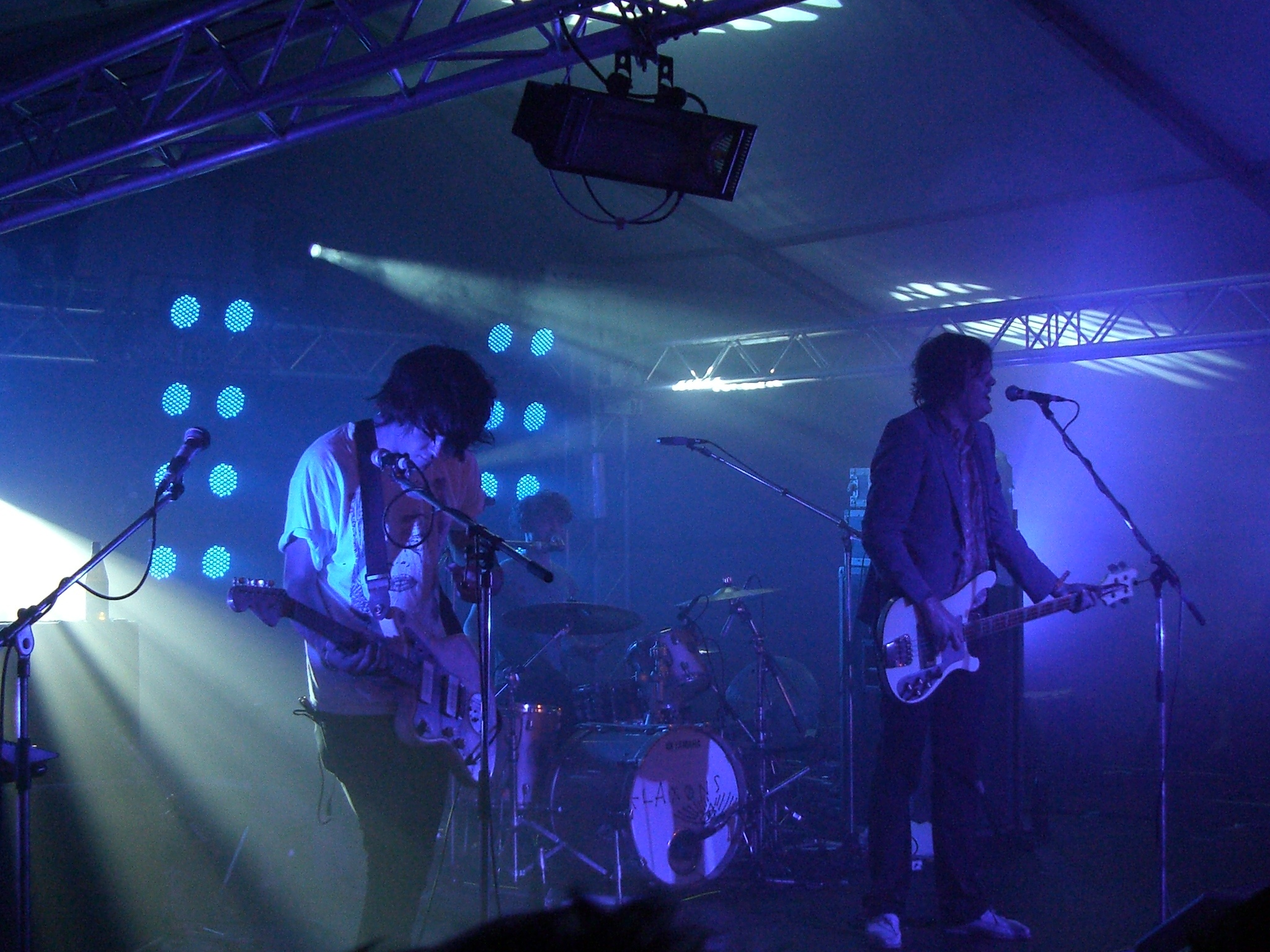
Klaxons playing at Queens' May Ball in 2007

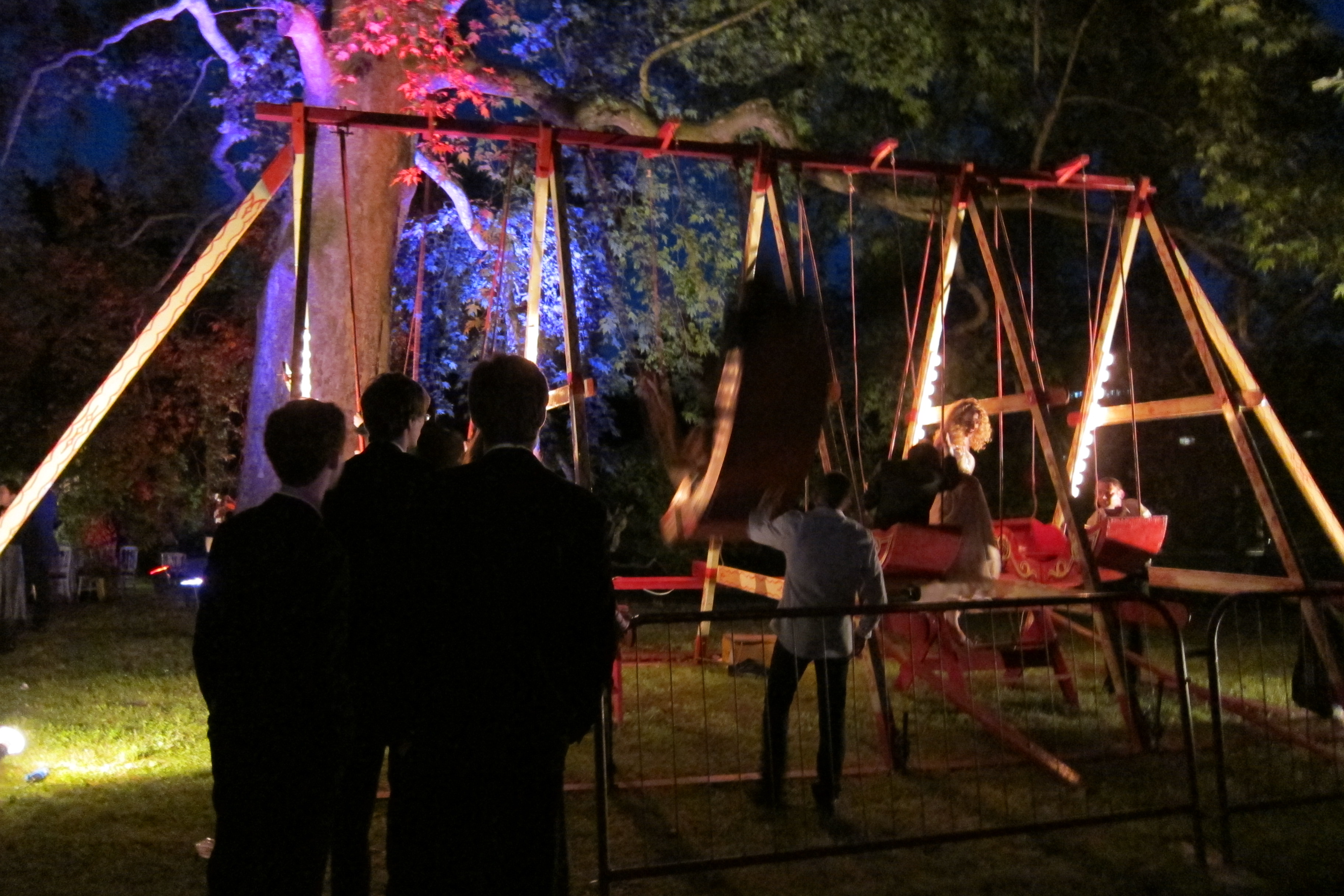
Jesus College May Ball 2012

== See also ==
- Commemoration ball - similar summer balls at the University of Oxford
