= The Electric Swing Circus =

British band

Electric Swing Circus
- Origin: Birmingham, England
- Genres: Electro swing
- Years active: 2011–present
- Labels: Independent
- Members: Tom Hyland; Fe Salamon; Patrick Wreford; Rashad Gregory; Vicki Olivia
- Past members: Laura Owen-Wright; Eleanor Rose; Bridget Walsh; Chandra Walker
- Website: www.electricswingcircus.com

The Electric Swing Circus are a six-piece electro swing band based in Birmingham, England. The line up features Vicki Olivia (vocals), Fe Salomon (vocals), Tom Hyland (guitar), Rashad Gregory (samples, MPC, and synths), and Patrick Wreford (electric double bass and bass synth). The Electric Swing Circus formed in June 2011. The band's preview EP, Penniless Optimist, was released in September 2011, and their debut album Electric Swing Circus in May 2013. They released their second album, It Flew By in January 2017. Their third album, Pleasure Seekers, was released in March 2022.

== History ==
=== 2011 ===
The Electric Swing Circus had their first live performance at the Book Club on 17 September 2011. The band also recorded the video for "Penniless Optimist". The song received airplay on BBC Radio 6 on The Craig Charles Funk and Soul Show, and the video was shown on BBC Big Screens nationwide.

At the 2011 ElectroSwing People's Favourite Awards, the Electric Swing Circus won Best Live Act.

Electric Swing Circus has a residency at Hot Club de Swing, a club night at the Hare & Hounds, Kings Heath.

=== 2012 ===
The Electric Swing Circus played many festivals during 2012, including Bestival, Secret Garden Party, Nozstock, Boomtown, Beat-Herder, Fieldview and WOMAD.

=== 2013–2015 – Electric Swing Circus ===
The Electric Swing Circus filmed the video for the single "Valentine" in March 2013. It was filmed in Birmingham Municipal Bank and premièred at Swingamajig Festival in May that year.

On 9 May 2013, the band released their self-titled debut album. They played several festivals, including their biggest show to date on the Spirit of 71' / Glade stage Glastonbury Festival, Shambala, and Fusion Festival. They were listed in the Glastonbury guide as "one of the highlights of Glastonbury".

In 2014, the band played Edinburgh Festival for the first time; their performances on the BBC stage were described as "electro-swing at its best".

In 2015, the band headlined the Avalon Stage at Glastonbury. Later that year, they began to record their second album.

=== 2016–2019 – It Flew By ===
Most of the second album, It Flew By, recorded in early 2016. It was crowdfunded and recorded at Middle Farm and Giant Wafer studios. The band played Swingamajig festival, where they released Empires EP (Swingamajig Edition) and included the tracks "Empires" and "Hit&Run" which were the first tracks recorded for the new album.

The album was released in 2017. The following year, the band released the Connected/ Invisible Man E.P. recorded with long-term collaborator and producer James Bragg. The EP was promoted with a tour including an appearance at Heitere Open Air Festival in Switzerland.

=== 2022–present: Pleasure Seekers ===
The band's third album, Pleasure Seekers, was released in March 2022 and includes the singles "Gravity" and "Expectations".

== Swingamajig Festival ==
In May 2013, the band hosted the first Swingamajig, a one-day festival in Digbeth, Birmingham. The Electric Swing Circus co-headlined the event alongside acts including The Correspondents, Dutty Moonshine, Odjbox and Pierre, DJ Switch and C@ in the H@.

In May 2014, the second festival took place in Digbeth, with acts including Molotov Jukebox. The 2015 festival featured Chinese Man, and the fourth in 2016 featured Balkan Beat Box as headliners.

== Band members ==
- Vicki Olivia – Vocals
- Fe Salomon – Vocals
- Marcus Copeland – Drums
- Tom Hyland – Guitar, vocals
- Rashad Gregory – Samples, MPC, synths
- Patrick Wreford – Bass guitar/double bass, bass Synth
- Bridge Williams – Sound

== Former band members ==
- Laura Owen-Wright – Vocals
- Bridget Walsh – Vocals
- Eleanor Rose – Vocals
- Chandra Walker – Drums/keys

== Discography ==
- Penniless Optimist (2011)
- Penniless Optimist Premix EP (2011)
- The Electric Swing Circus (2013)
- Empires EP (Swingamajig Edition) (2016)
- It Flew By (2017)
- Connected/Invisible Man (2019)
- Pleasure Seekers (2022)
