= City of Sin (album) =

Studio album by Dutty Moonshine Big Band
- Released: 29 May 2020
- Label: Dutty Moonshine; Rum Runner

Dutty Moonshine Big Band chronology
Most Wanted (2017)	City of Sin (2020)

City of Sin is the second studio album by English electronic dance music group the Dutty Moonshine Big Band, released on 29 May 2020. It reached number 40 in the UK Albums Chart and number one in the UK Dance Albums Chart.

== Track listing ==
1. "Big Band Fam" (featuring Hypeman Sage) – 3:14
2. "Click Clack Boom" – 3:18
3. "City of Sin" – 3:53
4. "Outlaws" (featuring Hypeman Sage) – 4:14
5. "Fever" (featuring Crash Party) – 3:03
6. "Tommy & Loretta" (featuring OdjBox) – 6:39
7. "Fall from Grace" – 3:59
8. "The Arrest" (featuring Hypeman Sage) – 3:46
9. "It's Alright" – 3:36
10. "Fiança" (featuring Chininha) – 4:12
11. "Locked Up" – 3:04
