= Sven Otten =

German dancer and YouTuber (born 1988)

- Born: 1988 (age 37–38); Germany
- Occupations: YouTuber, dancer, web producer

YouTube information
- Channel: @SvenOttenJustSomeMotion
- Years active: 2012-present
- Genre: Dance
- Subscribers: 508 thousand
- Views: 152 million
- Last updated: October 4, 2025

Sven Otten (born 1988) is a German dancer, web video producer. He became internationally known with his YouTube channel.

After Otten published his first video on YouTube in December 2012, he soon attracted attention. With his second video, he achieved his greatest success to date with around 50 million. In this video he dances to the song All Night by Parov Stelar. His dancestyle is known as Neoswing. It consists of elements of swing and more modern dances. He made his first TV appearance on Got to Dance in 2015. Since then, he has featured in some TV commercials.
