= May Week =

Celebration of the end of the academic year at Cambridge

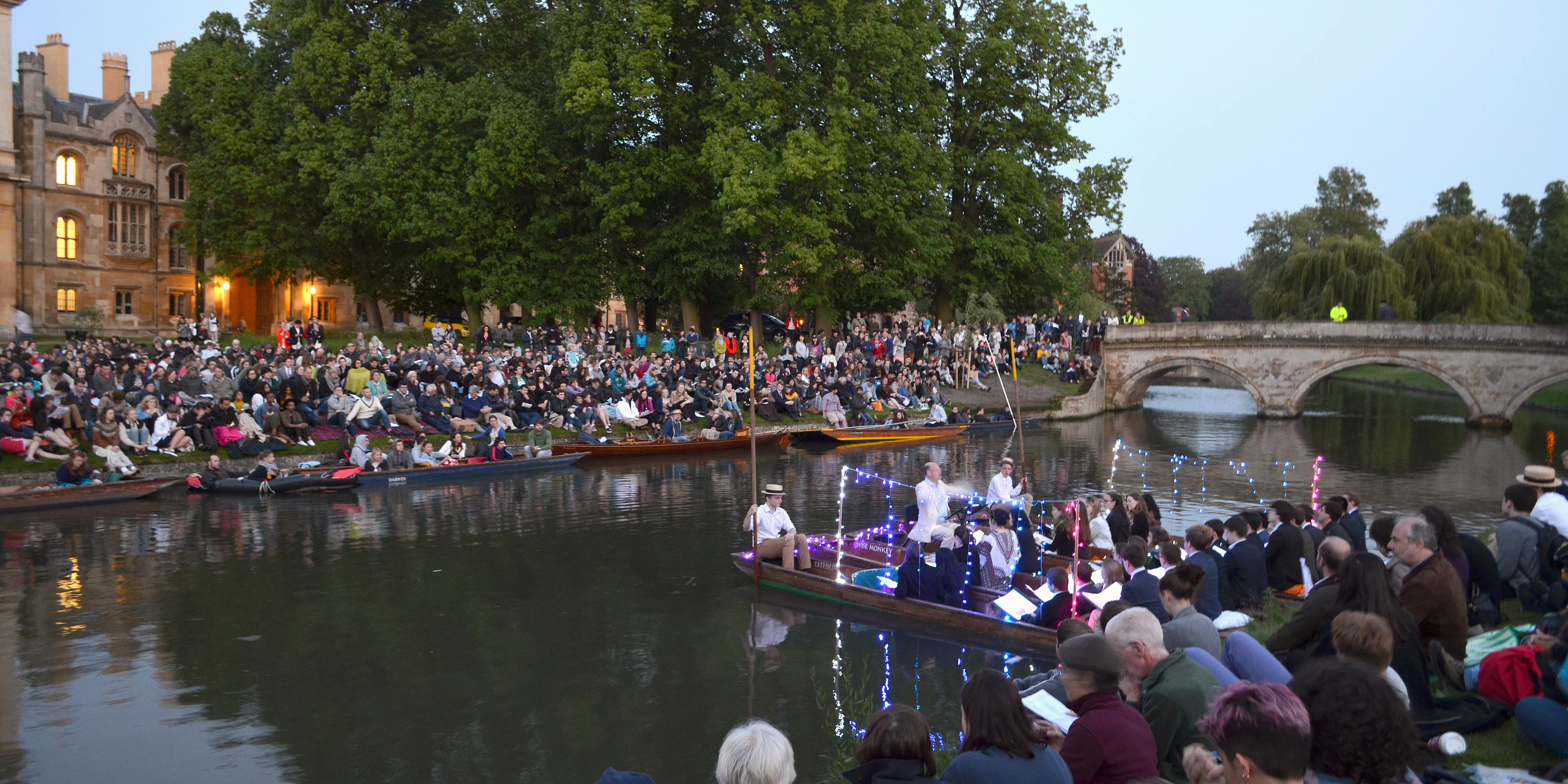
The Trinity College choir at Singing on the River 2016

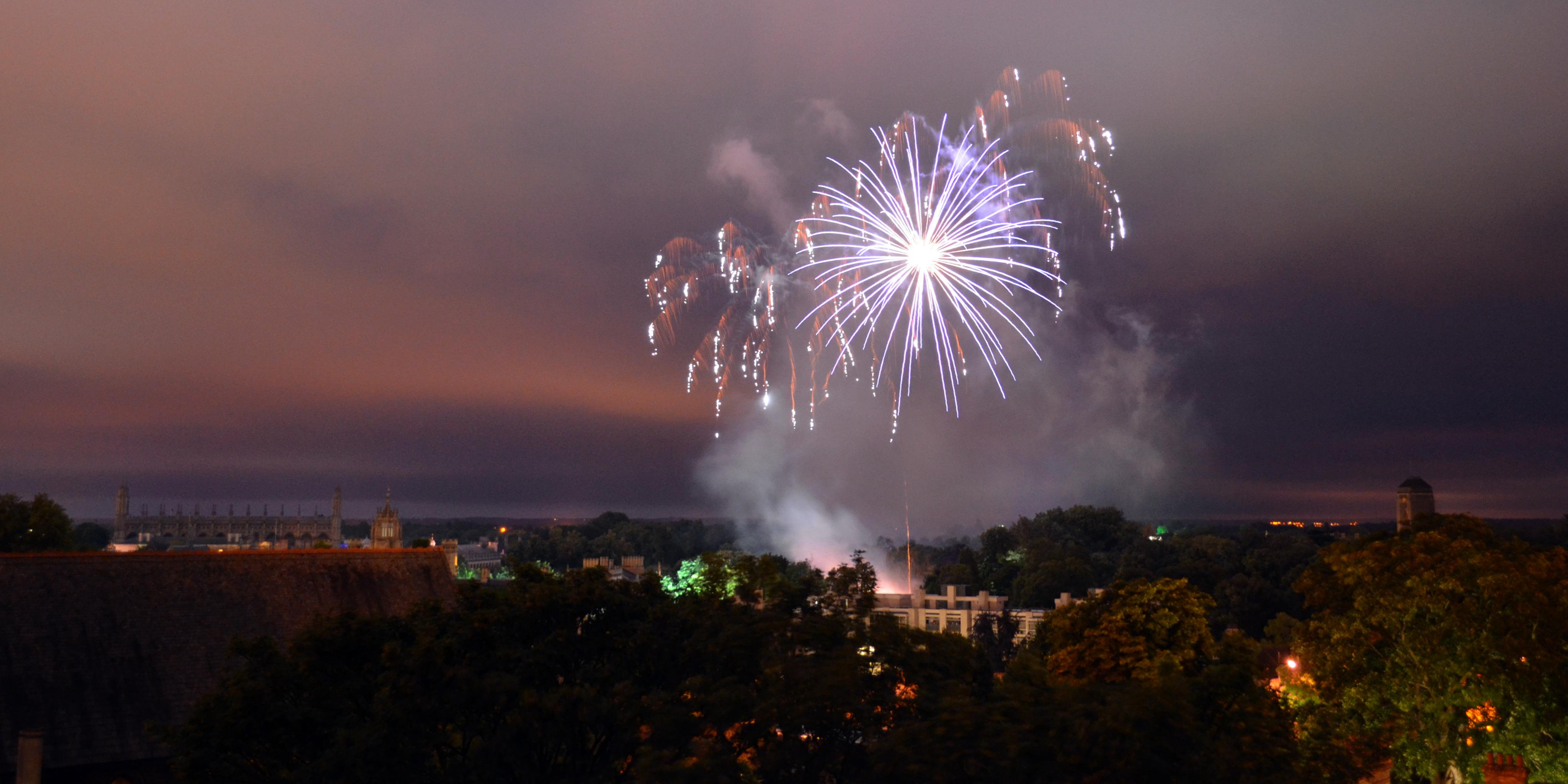
St John's College May Ball 2014 fireworks from Castle Mound

May Week is the name used in the University of Cambridge to refer to a period at the end of the academic year. Originally May Week took place in the week during May before year-end exams began. Nowadays, May Week takes place in June after exams, and is a cause for great celebration amongst the students of the University. Highlights of the week include bumps races, May Balls, June Events and garden parties.

== History ==
May Week festivities were originally held in May, in the final week before exams; however, the May boat races, also known as the May Bumps, moving toward June, right after exams to celebrate the year end.

== Suicide Sunday ==
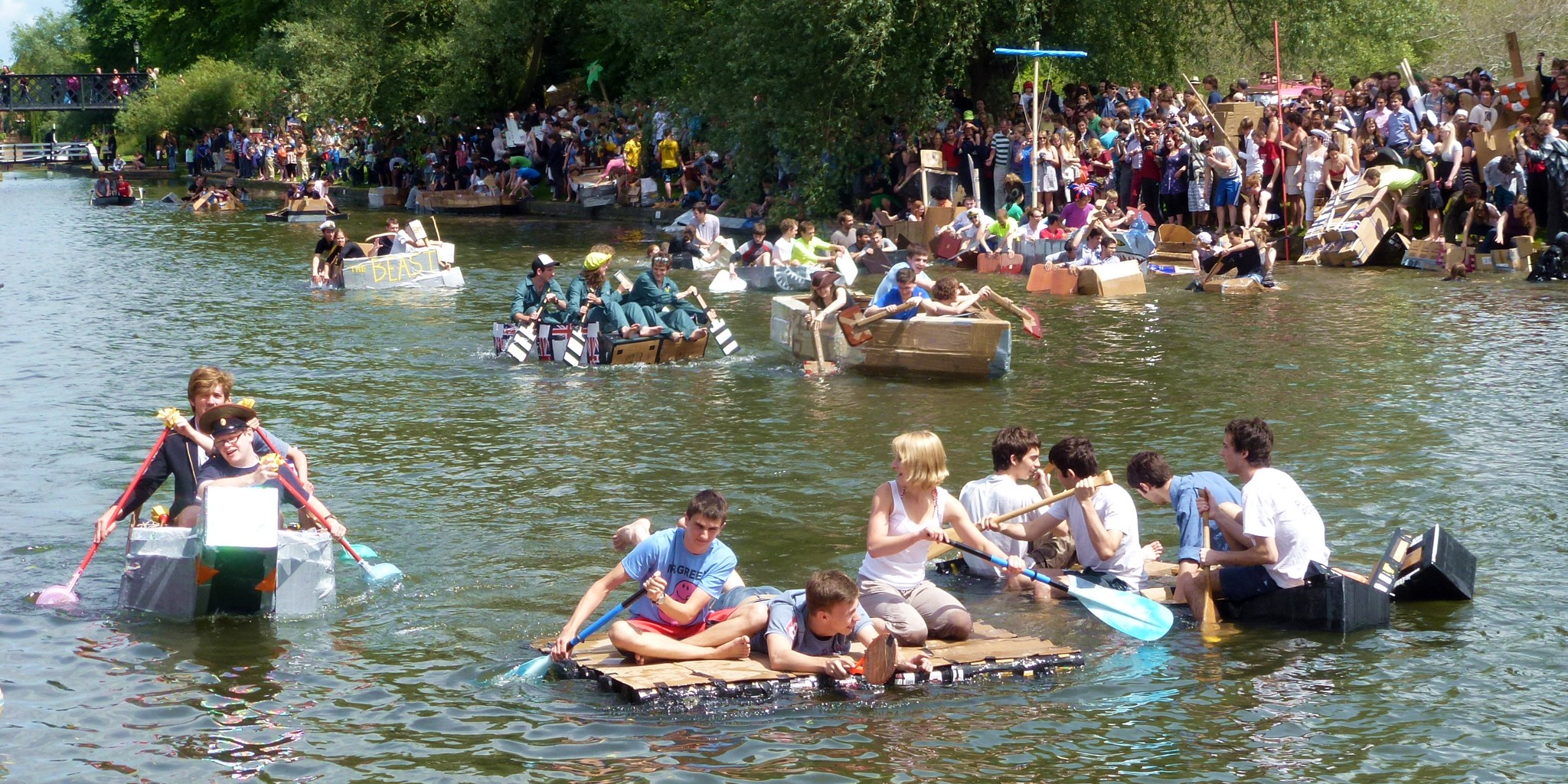
Some cardboard boat race participants on Suicide Sunday 2012

Suicide Sunday is the name used at Cambridge University to refer to the Sunday immediately after the end of the summer term (known as Easter Term). By this Sunday, all students have finished exams but most of the results have not been published, so it is traditionally a period of nerves and suspense. A student-led campaign in 2015 encouraged use of the name "May Week Sunday" instead, though "Suicide Sunday" continues to persist among students and the public.

The name refers to the celebration of the end of exam term, in contrast to Caesarian Sunday on the day before the early May Bank Holiday which is named after the Jesus College drinking society, the Caesarians. Caesarian Sunday is traditionally a final opportunity for students to get drunk on Jesus Green before exams begin.

The events are for current students of the University of Cambridge but are frequented by former students that indulge in the student lifestyle.

The Cardboard Boat Race is a main attraction to Suicide Sunday, offering an alternative to the many garden parties and more serious boating. The first race was in 2010, with three boats from Magdalene College. In 2011, the race was opened to other colleges.
