= Boogie Belgique =

Belgian swing hop band

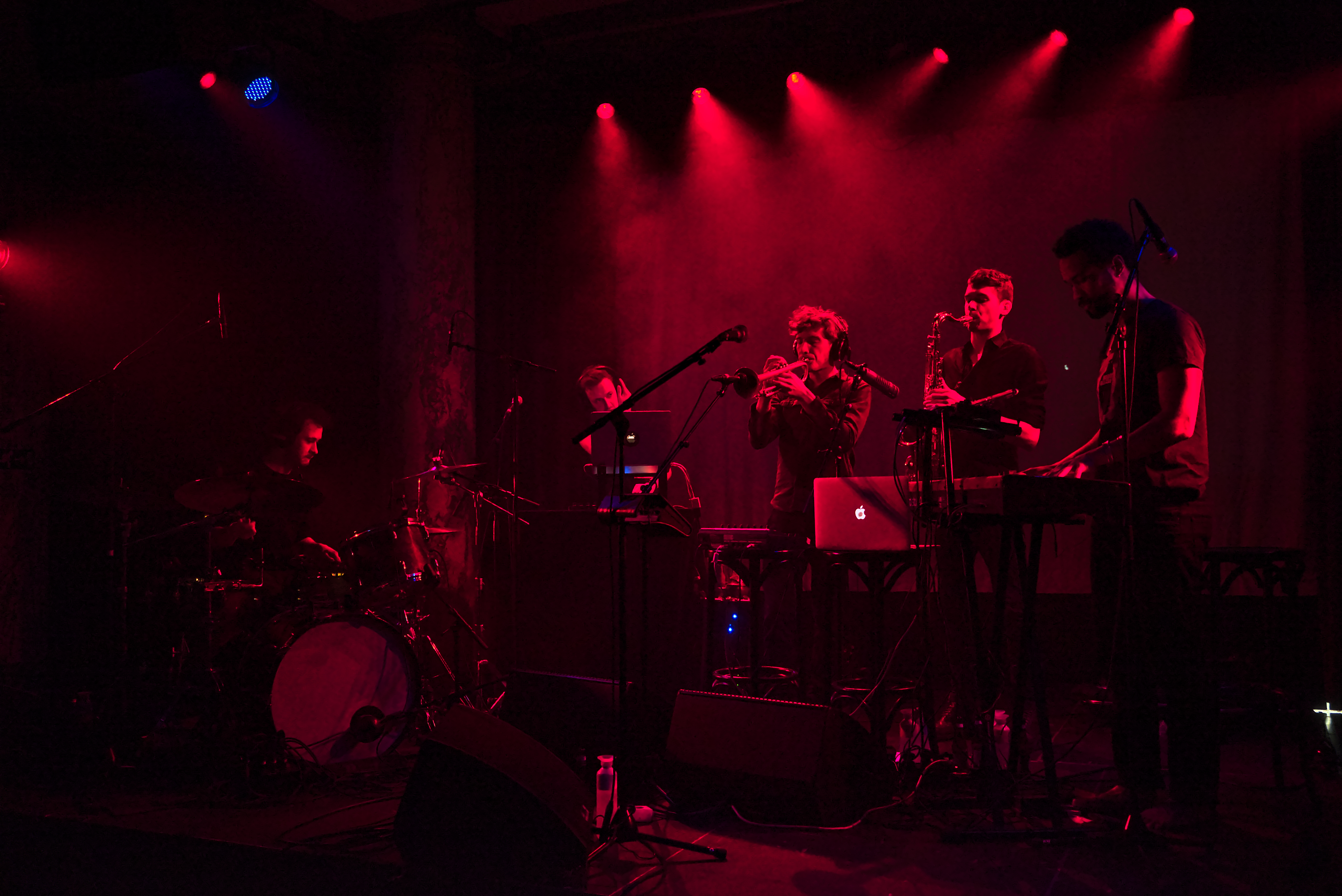
- Live performance at De Roma in 2018

Background information
- Origin: Belgium
- Genres: Experimental hip hop; electro swing
- Years active: 2012-present
- Labels: Dusted Wax Kingdom; Cold Busted
- Members: Oswald Cromheecke; Cedric Van Overstraeten; Aiko Devriendt; Martijn Van Den Broek; Ambroos De Schepper; Emily Van Overstraeten
- Website: boogiebelgique.com

Boogie Belgique is a Belgian experimental hip hop and electro swing band (self-described as swing hop) started by Oswald Cromheecke in 2012.

== Members ==
- Oswald Cromheecke (2012–present)
- Cedric Van Overstraeten: trumpet
- Aiko Devriendt: keys
- Martijn Van Den Broek: drums
- Emily Van Overstraeten: vocals
- Ambroos De Schepper: saxophone
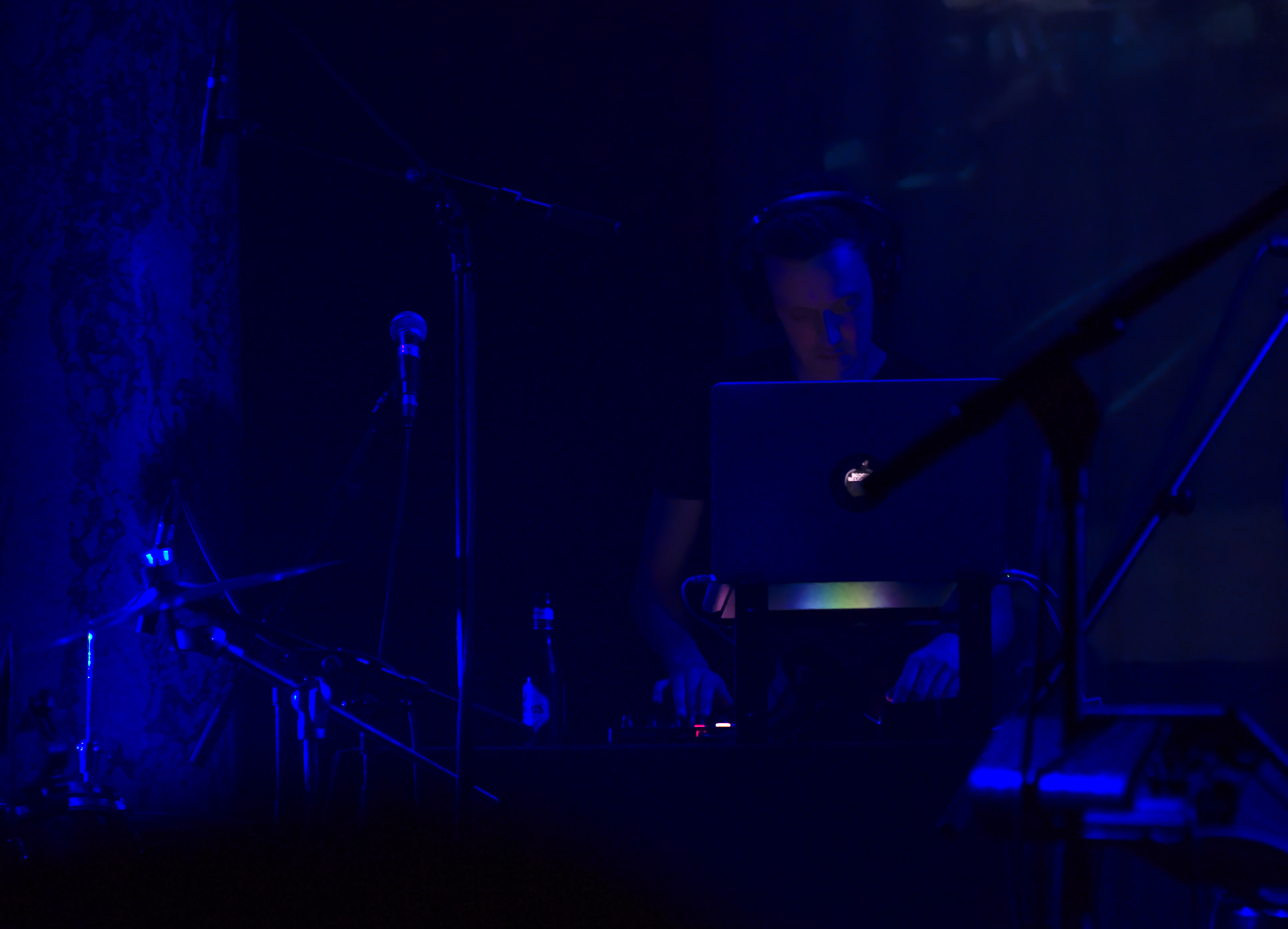
Oswald Cromheecke

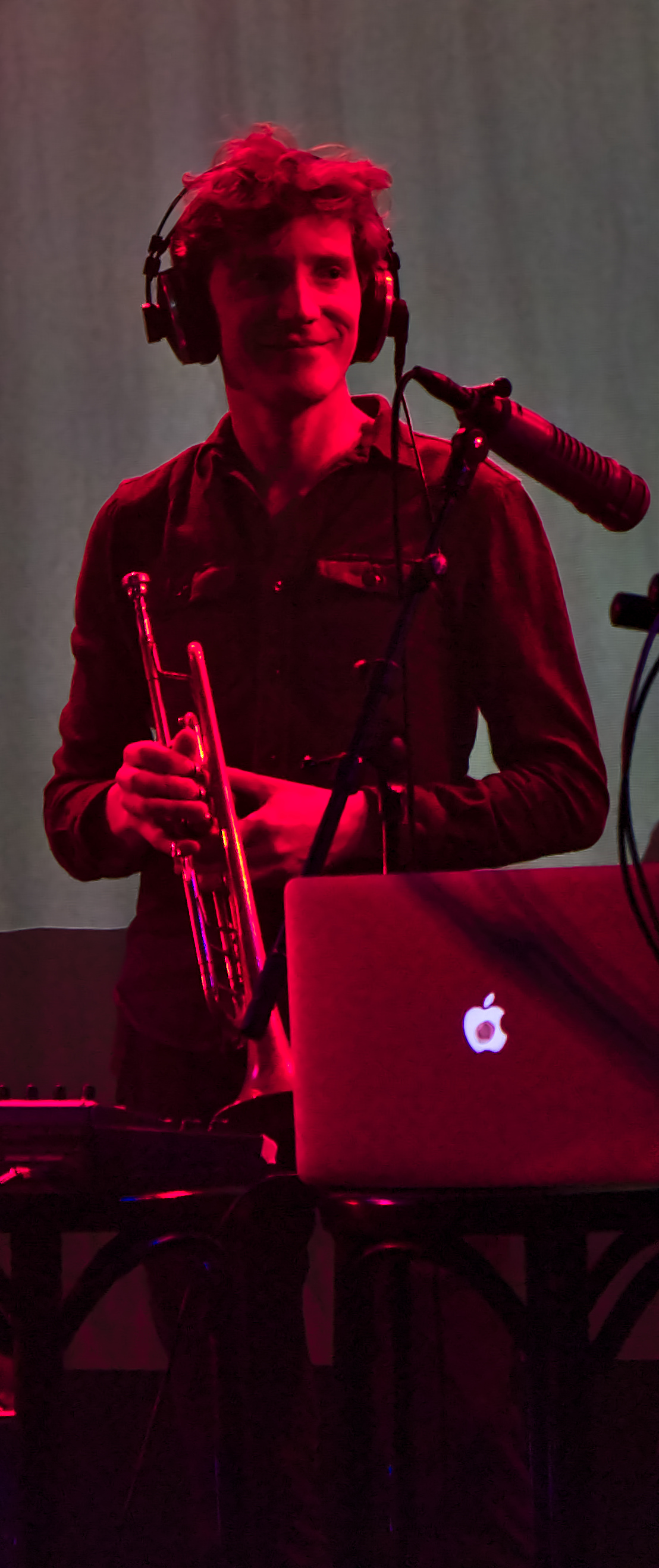
Cedric Van Overstraeten

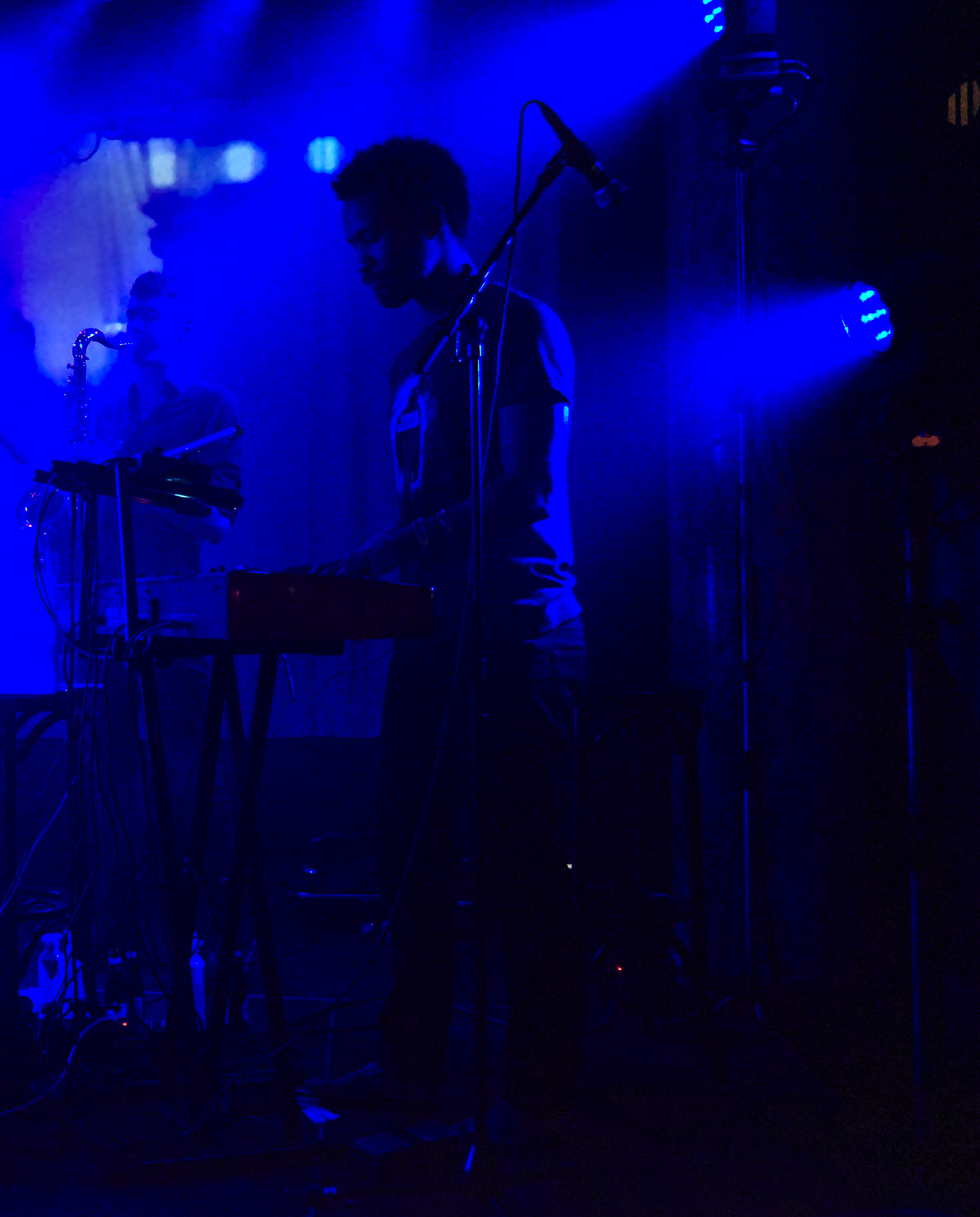
Aiko Devriendt

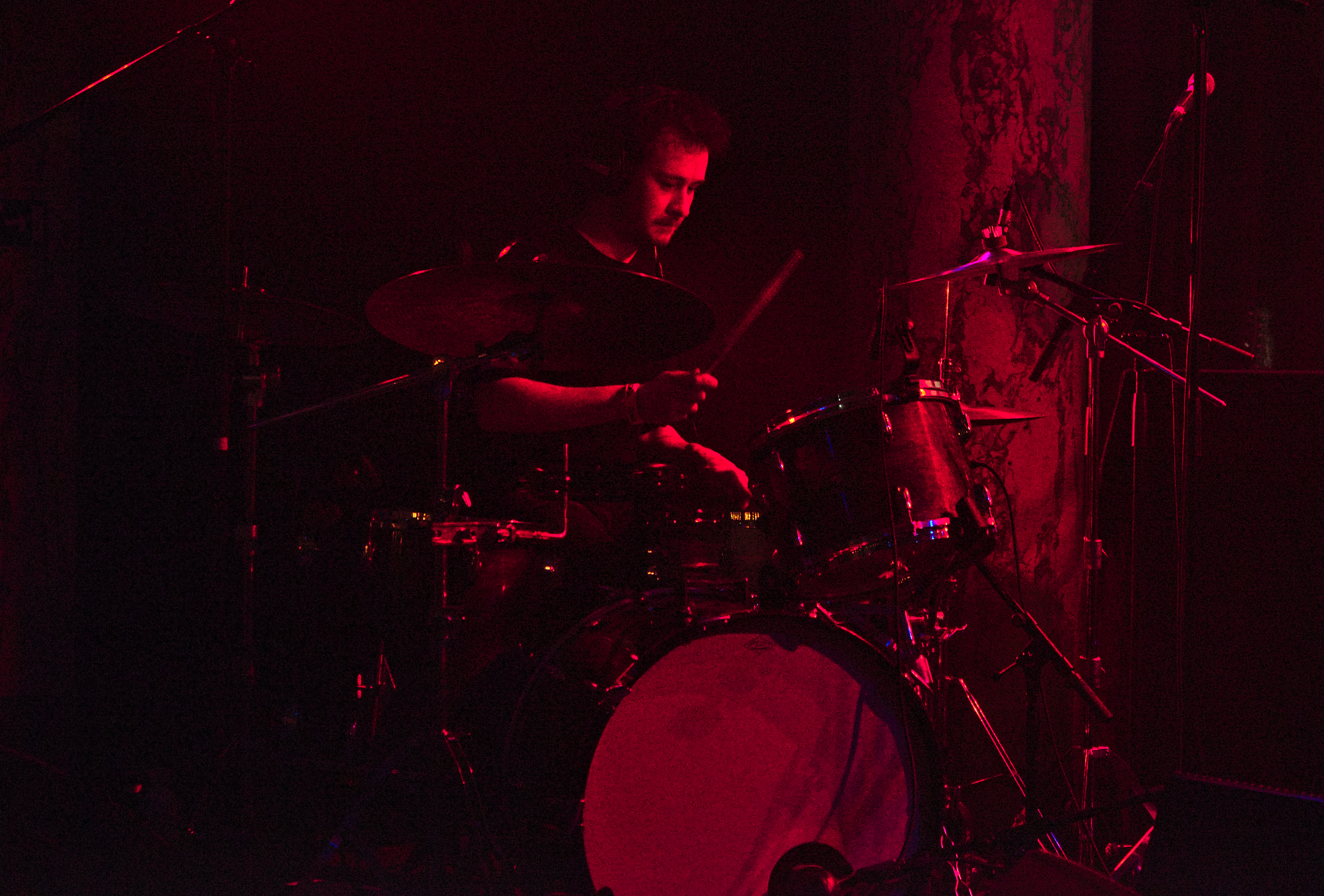
Martijn Van Den Broek

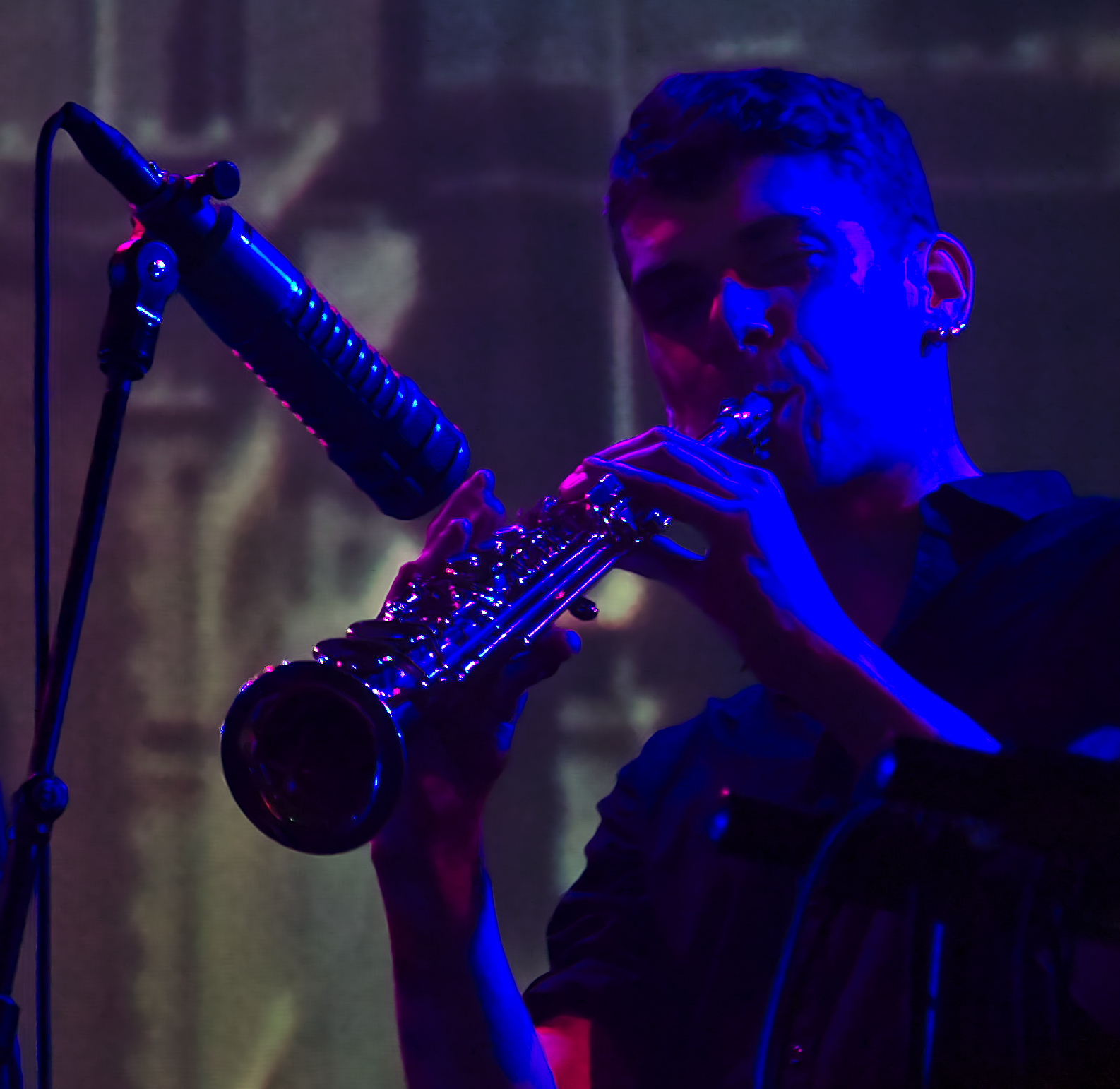
Ambroos De Schepper

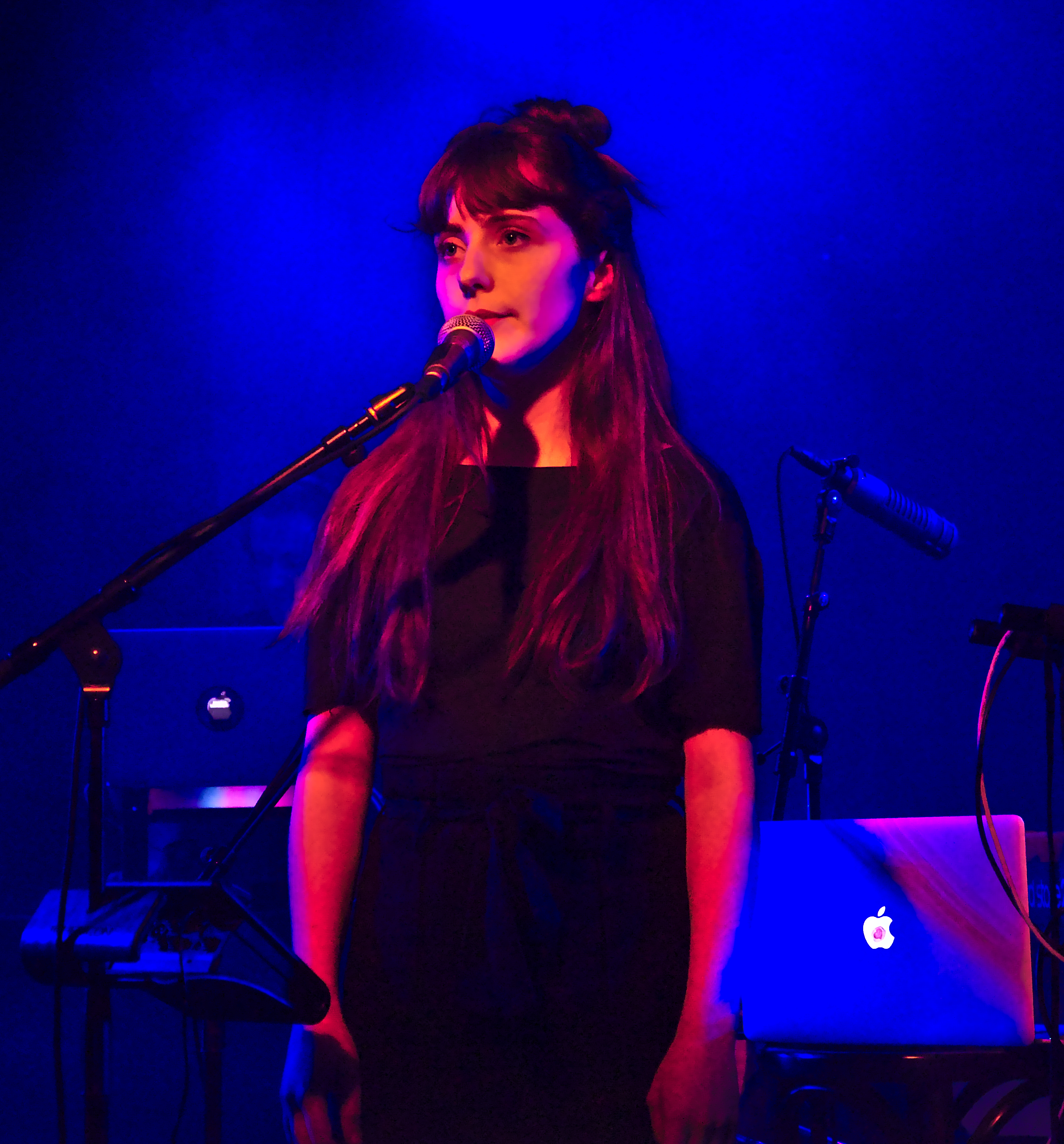
Emily Van Overstraeten

== Discography ==
- 2012: Blueberry Hill
- 2012: Time for a Boogie
- 2013: Nightwalker vol. 1
- 2014: Nightwalker vol. 2
- 2016: Volta
- 2022: Machine
- 2024: Postlude to Machine

Blueberry Hill and Nightwalker vol. 1 and 2 have been released for free under a Creative Commons license.
