= The Correspondents (band) =

British electro swing duo

- Origin: London, England
- Genres: electro swing; Electronica; alternative hip hop; drum and bass
- Years active: 2007 – 2020
- Past members: Ian Bruce; Tim "Chucks" Cole

The Correspondents were a British electro swing duo based in London, formed by MC and vocalist Ian Bruce and producer Tim Cole in 2007.

Their music has been described as electro swing with a mixture of early 20th century jazz and electro and drum and bass. Their live shows and recorded music consisted of multi-genre dance music spanning blues, jazz, soul, funk and out and out electro pop.

The band played at major festivals such as WOMAD, Glastonbury, Bestival, Boomtown and Secret Garden Party.

Their song "Fear and Delight" was used as the theme tune to BBC Three comedy Crims.

The project was retired on 20 October 2020 after Bruce published a status on The Correspondents' Facebook page stating that Cole had died unexpectedly of a pulmonary embolism a few days prior.

== Awards and recognition ==
The band was included in The Telegraph's top 10 Glastonbury highlights two years in a row and has also been featured in Rob da Bank's 2-hour Electro Swing Special on BBC Radio 1.

The music video to their single "Fear & Delight", directed by Naren Wilks, was the overall winner of Berlin Music Video Awards 2014, while it also won the award for "Best VFX" category.

== Discography ==
=== Albums ===
- Puppet Loosely Strung, released 10 March 2014
- Foolishman, released 22 September 2017
- 10 Years, released December 2017 as a limited edition vinyl compilation only.

=== EPs ===
- Rogue, released 2008
- What's Happened To Soho, released 11 April 2011 under the Freshly Squeezed music label
- Who Knew - EP, released 2 November 2018 under the From.Our.Own label.

=== Singles ===
- "Cheating With You", released 7 November 2011
- "Well Measured Vice", released 28 January 2013
- "Fear & Delight", released 9 December 2013
- "Finally", released 4 May 2016
- "Inexplicable", released 5 August 2016
- "Who Knew", released 10 October 2018
