= Electro swing =

Style of electronic music

- Other names: Swing house
- Stylistic origins: EDM; house; swing; jazz; hip hop
- Cultural origins: Early 1990s, Europe and the United States

Other topics
- Nu-disco; swing revival; nu jazz

Electro swing, or swing house, is an electronic dance music genre that combines the influence of vintage or modern swing and jazz mixed with house and hip hop. Successful examples of the genre create a modern and dance-floor focused sound that is more readily accessible to the modern ear, but that also retains the energetic excitement of live brass and early swing recordings. Electro swing groups typically include singers, musicians playing traditional jazz instruments (e.g. trumpet, trombone, clarinet, saxophone) and at least one DJ.

== Notable artists ==
- AronChupa
- Boogie Belgique
- Caravan Palace
- Caro Emerald
- DelaDap
- Deluxe
- Dimie Cat
- Dutty Moonshine Big Band
- Electric Swing Circus
- Gramophondzie
- Kormac
- The Living Tombstone
- Parov Stelar
- Scatman John
- Yolanda Be Cool
- Waldeck
- Sven Otten

== Chart performances of notable releases ==
- "I'm an Albatraoz" by the Swedish DJ AronChupa has received multiple platinum certifications.
- Robot Face, an album by French band Caravan Palace placed at No. 3 on the US Top Dance/Electronic Albums chart in 2015.
- "We No Speak Americano" by Australian musicians Yolanda Be Cool and DCUP was a major hit in Australia and Europe, and reached No. 29 on the US Billboard Hot 100.
- Other notable songs include "Doop" by Doop (UK No. 1); "A Little Party Never Killed Nobody (All We Got)" by Fergie, Q-Tip and GoonRock (US platinum); "Bang Bang" by will.i.am (UK platinum); "Emergency" by Icona Pop (US Dance No. 1); and "Bboom Bboom" by Momoland (South Korea platinum).

== Bibliography ==
- Inglis, Chris (2023). Electro Swing: Resurrection, Recontextualisation, and Remix. Routledge. ISBN 9781000849622.
