= List of social activities at the University of Cambridge =

This is intended to be a complete list of articles detailing clubs, societies and other common leisure activities associated with the University of Cambridge, England.

== Sports ==
=== General ===
- Varsity match, the annual match for each sports team against the University of Oxford
- Cambridge Blue, an award for competing at the highest level of University sport
- The Hawks' Club, a social club for men with a Blue, Half Blue or Second Team Colours

=== Clubs ===
- Association football:
  - Cambridge University Association Football League
    - CUAFL Cuppers
    - CUAFL Plate
    - CUAFL Shield
    - CUAFL Vase
  - Cambridge University Association Football Club
  - Pegasus A.F.C., a now-defunct combined Oxford-Cambridge football team
- Cambridge University Cricket Club
- Rugby union:
  - Cambridge University Rugby Union Football Club
  - The Varsity Match, the annual rugby union varsity match
- Cambridge University Automobile Club
- Cambridge University Lawn Tennis Club
- Strange Blue, the Cambridge University Ultimate Club

=== Rowing ===
- Cambridge University Boat Club
- Cambridge University Combined Boat Clubs
- Cambridge University Lightweight Rowing Club
- Cambridge University Women's Boat Club
- The Boat Race
- Women's Boat Race
- Henley Boat Races

==== College boat clubs ====
- Caius Boat Club
- Christ's College Boat Club
- Churchill College Boat Club
- Clare Boat Club
- Corpus Christi College Boat Club
- Downing College Boat Club
- Emmanuel Boat Club
- Fitzwilliam College Boat Club
- Girton College Boat Club
- Homerton College Boat Club
- Hughes Hall Boat Club
- Jesus College Boat Club
- King's College Boat Club
- Lady Margaret Boat Club (St John's College)
- Lucy Cavendish College Boat Club
- Magdalene Boat Club
- Murray Edwards College Boat Club (previously New Hall Boat Club)
- Newnham College Boat Club
- Pembroke College Boat Club
- Peterhouse Boat Club
- Queens' College Boat Club
- Robinson College Boat Club
- Selwyn College Boat Club
- Sidney Sussex College Boat Club
- St. Catharine's College Boat Club
- Trinity College:
  - First Trinity Boat Club
  - Second Trinity Boat Club
  - Third Trinity Boat Club
  - First and Third Trinity Boat Club
- Trinity Hall Boat Club

==== Bumps races ====
- Lent Bumps
- May Bumps

== Political societies ==
- Cambridge University Liberal Association
- Cambridge Union Society, commonly known as the Cambridge Union - a debating union
- Cambridge University Conservative Association
- Cambridge University Labour Club
- The Wilberforce Society, the student think-tank
- Cambridge University Society of Women
- Gender Agenda: Feminist Collective
- Cambridge University Palestine Solidarity Society

== Academic societies ==
- The Archimedeans
- Adams Society
- Trinity Mathematical Society
- Cambridge University Scientific Society
- Cambridge University Moral Sciences Club
- Cambridge Philosophical Society
- Cambridge University Law Society
- Cambridge University SPS Society
- Cambridge University Computing and Technology Society
- Cambridge University Cybersecurity Society, which participates in Capture The Flag competitions under the associated team cheriPI

== Drama societies ==
- Amateur Dramatic Club
- Cambridge University Gilbert and Sullivan Society
- Footlights, an amateur dramatics and comedy club
- Cambridge University Light Entertainment Society
- Improvised Comedy Ents (ICE), the University's oldest improv society
- Alcock Improv, another improv society
- The Corpus Christi Fletcher Players
- The Movement, now a professional theatre company but still using actors from the University.
- Christ's Amateur Dramatic Society
- Girton Amateur Dramatics Society (GADS)

== Student Unions ==
- Cambridge University Students' Union, the Cambridge-wide federal union
- Graduate Union, the students' union specifically for Graduates

== Musical societies ==
- Cambridge University Musical Society (CUMS), a federation of the university's main orchestral and choral ensembles, which cumulatively put on a substantial concert season during the university term.
- Cambridge University Jazz Society
- Cambridge University Hip Hop Society
- Cambridge University Ceilidh Band (CUCB)
- Cambridge University Brass Band (CUBB)
- Cambridge University Opera Society (CUOS)
- Cambridge University Jazz Orchestra (CUJO)
- Cambridge Gamelan Society
- Cambridge University Steel Pan Society
- Cambridge University Guild of Change Ringers (CUGCR)

== College Music societies ==
- Emmanuel College Music Society (ECMS)
- Selwyn College Music Society (SCMS)
- Homerton College Music Society (HCMS)
- Trinity College Music Society (TCMS)
- Clare College Music Society (CCMS)
- Fitzwilliam College Music Society (FCMS)
- St John's College Music Society (SJCMS)
- MagSoc

== Choirs ==
- Choir of King's College, Cambridge, a world-renowned choir known for broadcast services, specifically Carols from King's.
- Choir of Trinity College, Cambridge, a renowned choral society.
- Choir of Sidney Sussex College, Cambridge, directed by David Skinner, (musicologist) and, uniquely among the collegiate choirs of Oxford and Cambridge, it sings an entirely Latin Vespers weekly.
- Choir of Clare College, Cambridge, directed by Graham Ross, (musician) and funded by John Rutter.
- Choir of Gonville and Caius College, Cambridge
- Christ's College Chapel Choir, Cambridge
- King's Voices, a mixed voice chapel choir based in King's College, Cambridge
- Choir of St John's College, Cambridge, a renowned choir that recently, 2022, allowed women and girls to participate.
- Queens' College Chapel Choir, Cambridge

== Miscellaneous societies ==
- Cam FM, the student radio station
- Cambridge Apostles, an elite intellectual secret society
- Cambridge Explorers, secret social and adventuring club
- Cambridge Inter-Collegiate Christian Union, a student Christian organisation
- Granta, periodical which started as a student society
- Hawks' Club, a member's club for university sportsmen
- Cambridge University Heraldic and Genealogical Society, a society dedicated to the study of heraldry and genealogy
- University Pitt Club, an exclusive social club
- Per Capita Media, Cambridge University's newest student publication and magazine.
- Cambridge University Punting Society, the oldest and largest extant punting society in the world.
- Cambridge University Railway Club, the oldest student railway and transport enthusiast society
- Cambridge University Science Fiction Society (CUSFS), known as one of the likely creators of The Game
  - Jómsborg the New - the Fantasy Fiction Society of Cambridge University. Formerly a splinter group, it now forms a subset of CUSFS.
- Cambridge University Scout and Guide Club (CUSAGC), the local branch of the Student Scout and Guide Organisation
- The Cambridge Student, a student newspaper
- Cambridge Student Community Action, a charity and volunteering organisation
- Cambridge University Tiddlywinks Club, the world's oldest tiddlywinks club
- Varsity, a student newspaper
- Cambridge University Wine Society, the university wine society
- Cambridge University Wireless Society, the university amateur radio club
- Cambridge University Anime and Manga Society
- Cambridge Vocaloid Society
- Cambridge University Joy Luck Club
- Cambridge Yuri Society
- Cambridge University LGBTQ+ Society
- Cambridge Assassins' Guild

== College clubs and societies ==
- Gonville & Caius A.F.C., the only college team to have reached the 1st round of the FA Cup
- Pembroke Players, an amateur dramatics society
- Go and Yes Minister Society (found in Girton College)
- Pembroke College Winnie-the-Pooh Society
- Churchill Regular Association for Poker

== Leisure activities ==
- Formal Hall, a formal dinner in a college
- June Event, an alternative to May Balls
- May Balls, a college ball, usually held annually in May Week
- May Week, the week after the end of examinations, actually in June
- Punting
- Suicide Sunday, the Sunday during May Week
