= Wine festival =

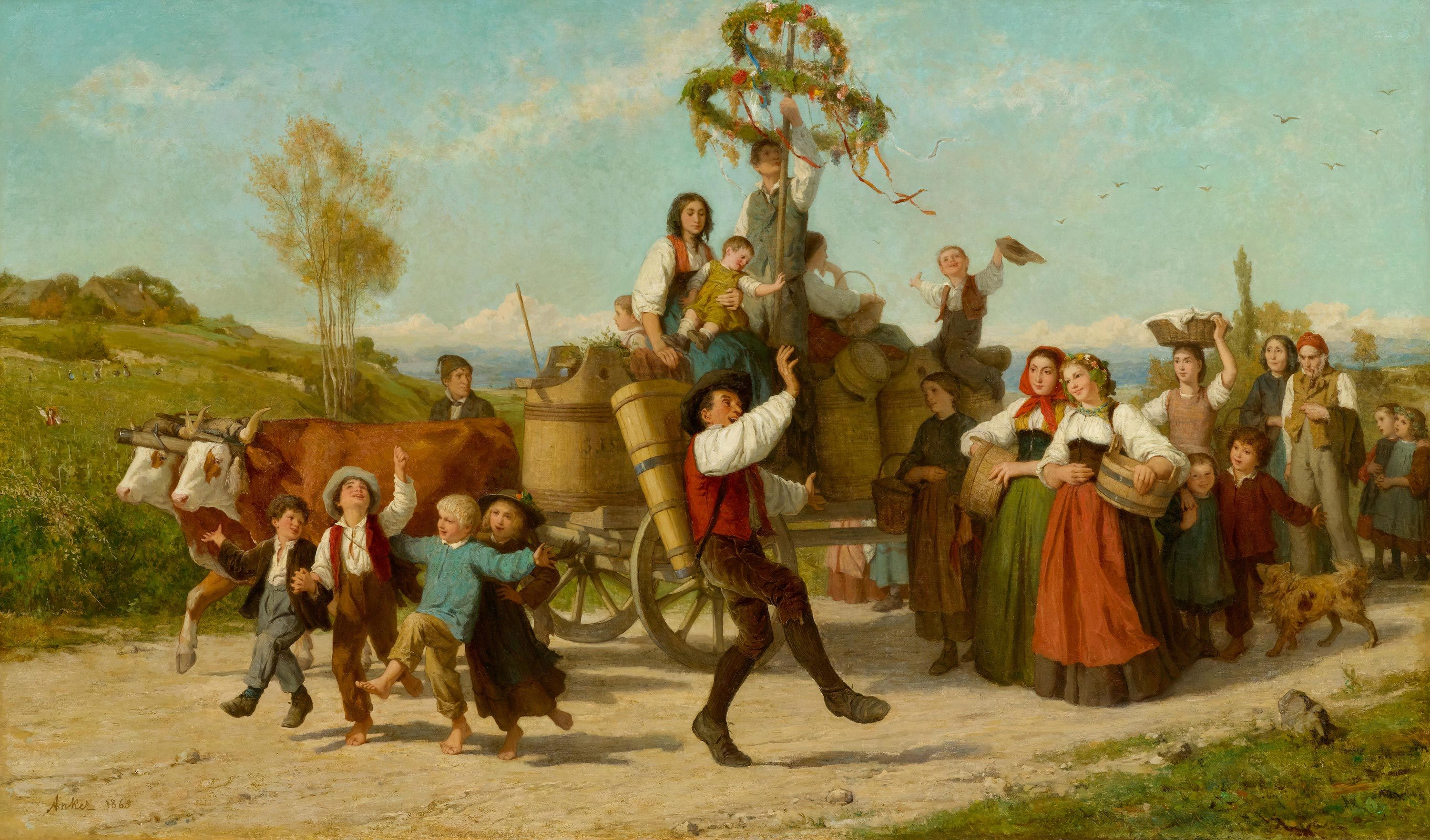
The Wine Festival (1865, Albert Anker, Switzerland)

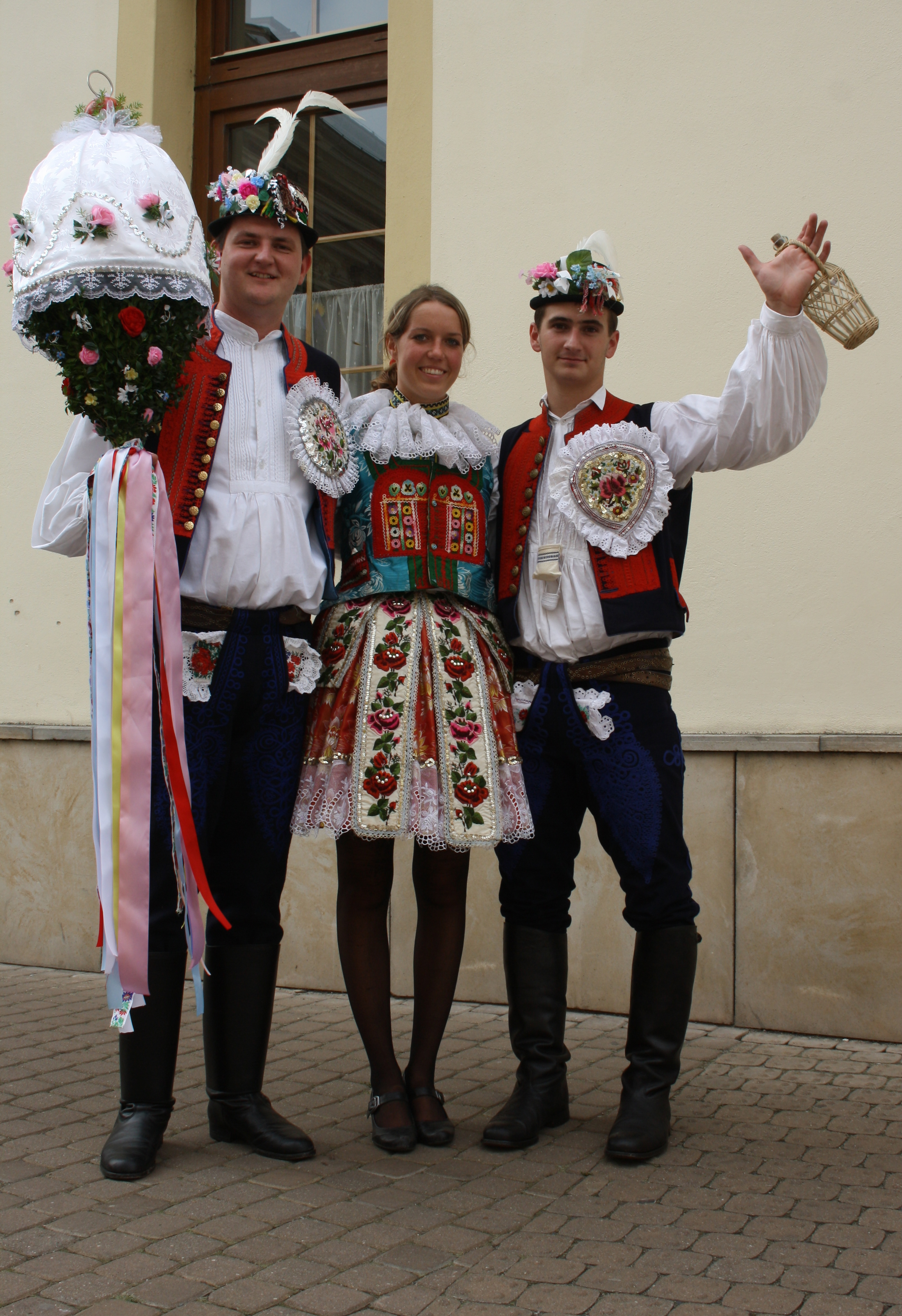
The costume of Dolní Němčí in Uherské Hradiště, the Czech Republic

Annual wine festivals celebrate viticulture and usually occur after the harvest of the grapes which, in the northern hemisphere, generally falls at the end of September and runs until well into October or later. They are common in most wine regions around the world and are to be considered in the tradition of other harvest festivals.

The Egyptian god Osiris was dedicated to wine, but the oldest historically documented wine festivals can be traced back to the Greek celebrations for their wine god Dionysos. The typical ingredients of a wine festival include wine drinking, grape pressing, regional foods, music and, in many areas, religious ritual.

== In culture ==
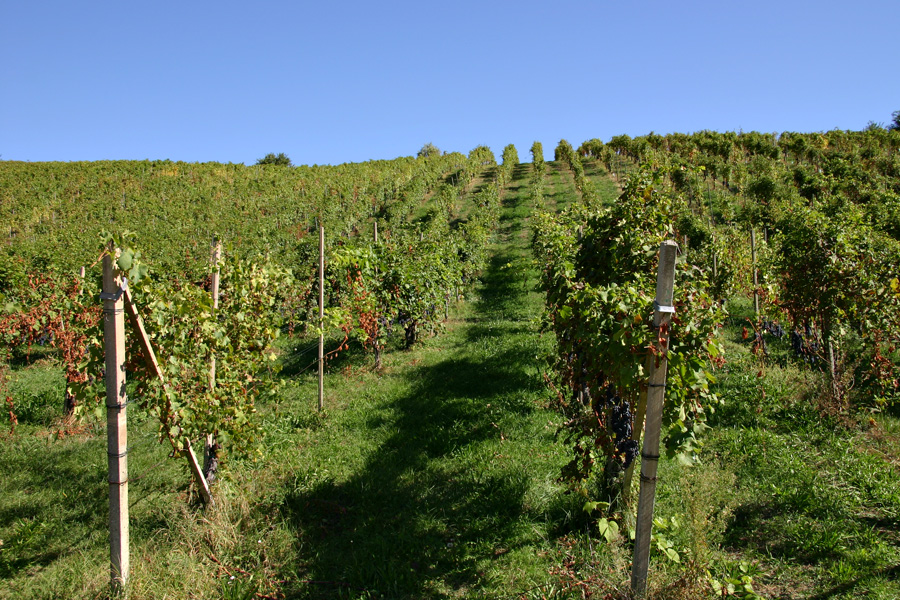
Fields of grape vines

The grape, and the extraction of its juice to produce wine, is more than a flavorsome food or drink. Both grapes and wine have immense cultural significance in many cultures, and often religious significance too.

== Competitions ==
- Oregon Wine Competition
- Concours Mondial de Bruxelles
- International Wine and Spirit Competition
- Varsity blind wine tasting match

== Festivals ==
=== Armenian festivals ===
- Areni Wine Festival
- Yerevan Wine Days

=== Australian festivals ===
- Barossa Vintage Festival
- Caxton Street Seafood and Wine Festival
- Grampians Grape Escape
- Kings Cross Food and Wine Festival
- Melbourne Food and Wine Festival

=== Brazilian festivals ===
- Festa do Vinho (Santa Catarina)
- Festa do Vinho de Andradas

=== Canadian festivals ===
- Cowichan Wine and Culinary Festival, British Columbia
- Niagara Grape and Wine Festival

=== German festivals ===
- Baden
  - Wine festival calendar
- Hessische Bergstraße
  - Winzerfest, Groß-Umstadt
- Mosel
  - Moselfest, Winningen
  - Weinfest der Mittelmosel, Bernkastel-Kues
- Palatinate
  - Burg- und Weinfest, Wachenheim
  - Deidesheimer Weinkerwe, Deidesheim
  - Deutsches Weinlesefest, Neustadt
  - Dürkheimer Wurstmarkt, Bad Dürkheim
  - Eselshautfest, Mußbach
  - Fest des Federweißen, Landau
  - Kändelgassenfest, Großkarlbach
  - Mandelblütenfest, Gimmeldingen
  - Stadtmauerfest, Freinsheim

Rheingauer Weinmarkt, Frankfurt

- Rheingau
  - Rheingauer Weinwoche, Wiesbaden
- Rheinhessen
  - Weinmarkt Mainz, Mainz
  - Backfischfest, Worms
- Saxony
  - Herbst- und Weinfest, Radebeul
- Württemberg
  - Fellbacher Herbst, Fellbach
  - Stuttgarter Weindorf, Stuttgart

=== French festivals ===
- Beaujolais Nouveau
- Bordeaux Wine Festival, Bordeaux, France

la paulee de mersault, Burgundy, France тРыФ

=== Hungarian festivals ===
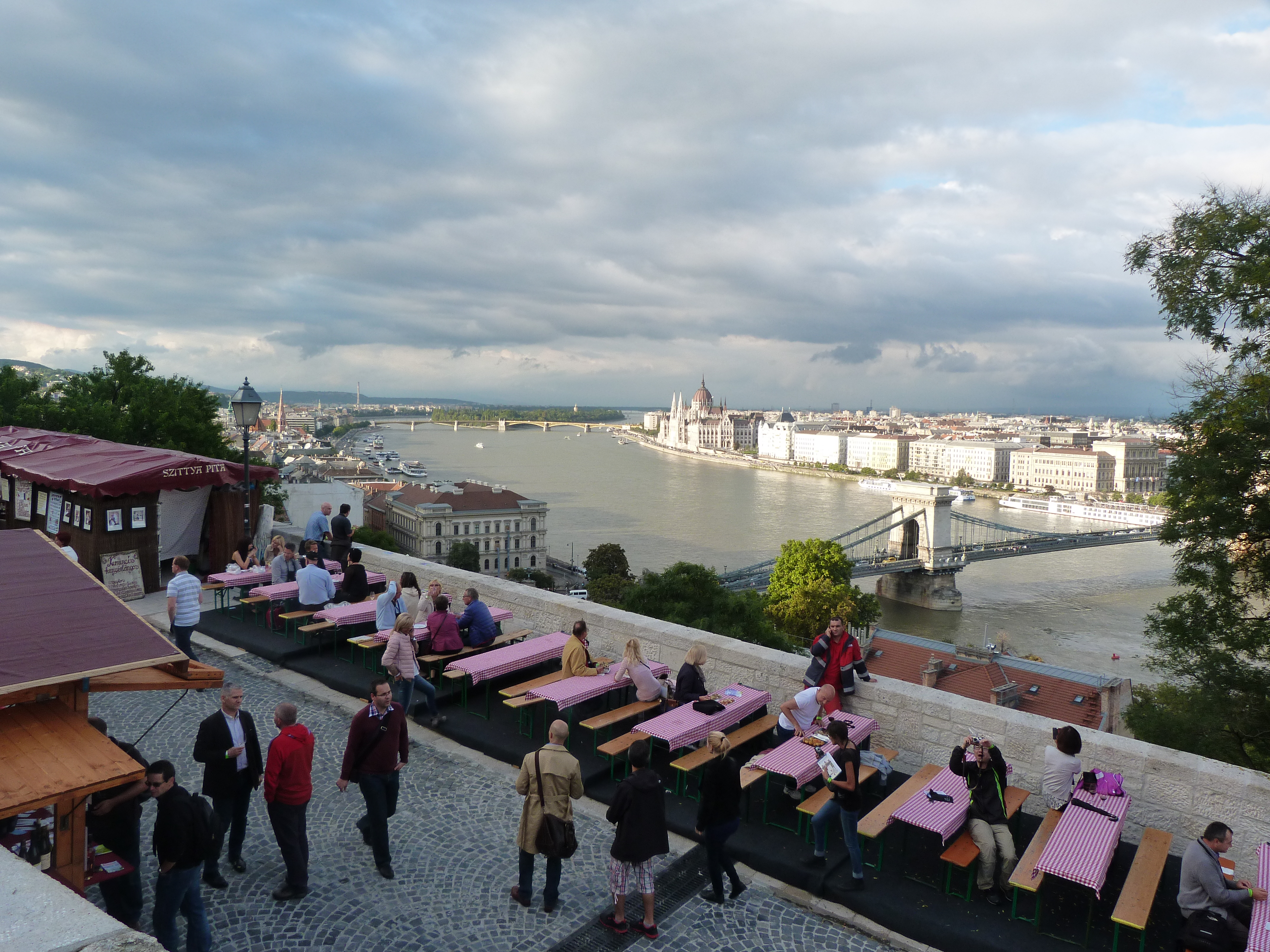
Budavári Borfesztivál, 2014

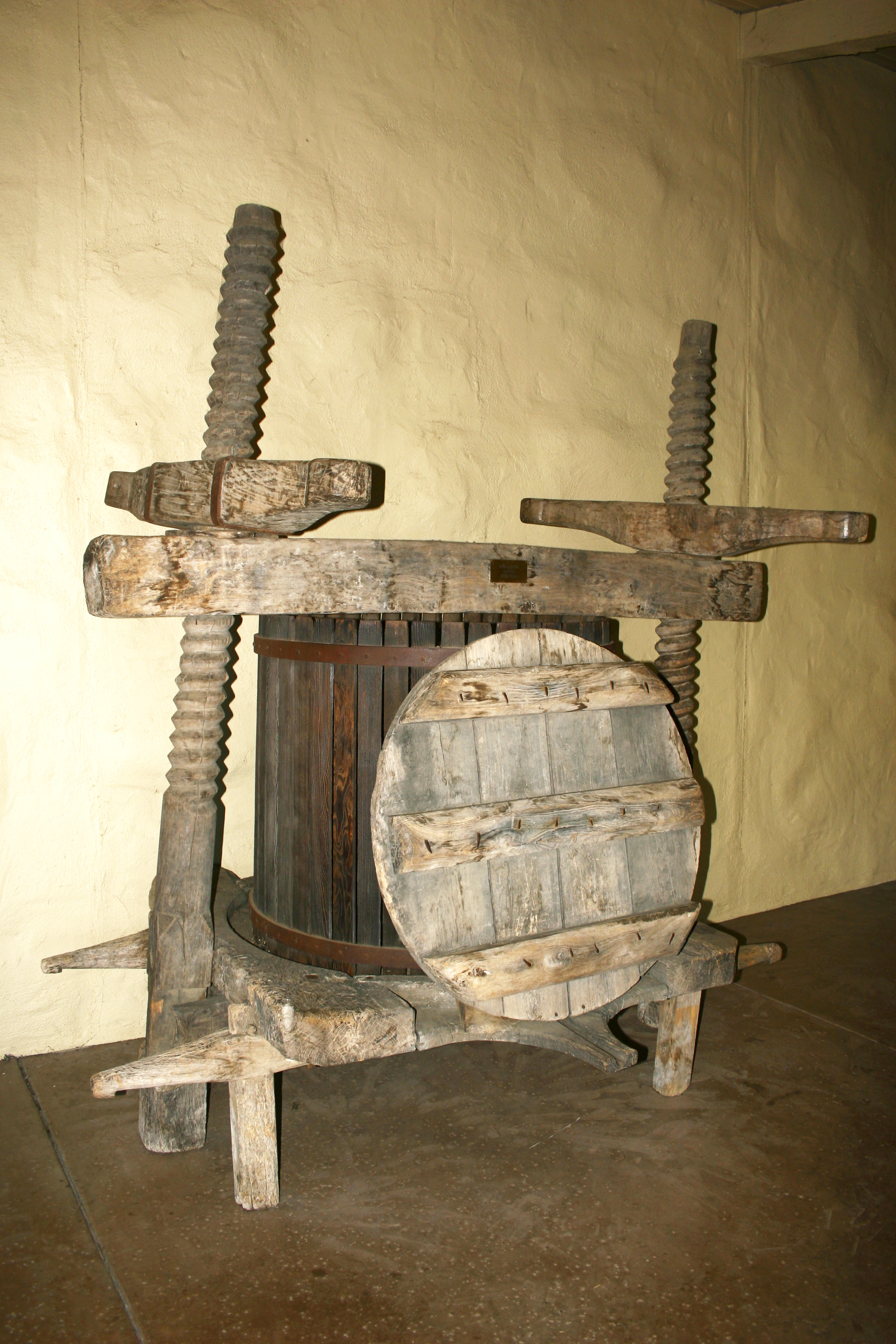
16th-century wine press

- Badacsony Wine Weeks, Badacsonytomaj
- Balatonboglár Grape Harvest Days, Balatonboglár
- Balatonfüred Wine Weeks, Balatonfüred
- BorZsongás, wine festival of Villány
- Budapest International Wine Festival, Budapest - the largest Hungarian wine festival (about 50,000 people per festival)
- Budavári Borfesztivál, Budapest
- Eger Grape Harvest Festival, Eger
- Eger Star Wine Festival (Egri Csillag Borfesztivál), Eger
- Etyek Cellar Festival, Etyek
- Gourmet Festival, Budapest
- Grape Harvest Festival of Tokaj-Hegyalja, Tokaj
- Győr Wine Days, Győr
- Pannonhalma Wine Region Cellar Festival, Pannonhalma
- Rosé Riesling and Jazz Days, Veszprém
- Sopron Grape Harvest Days, Sopron
- Szekszárd Grape Harvest Festival, Szekszárd
- Tihany Grape Harvest Days, Tihany
- Tokaj Wine Festival, Tokaj
- Villány Grape Harvest Festival, Villány
- VinAgora, Budapest
- Wine Festival of Balaton's wines, Budapest

=== United States festivals ===
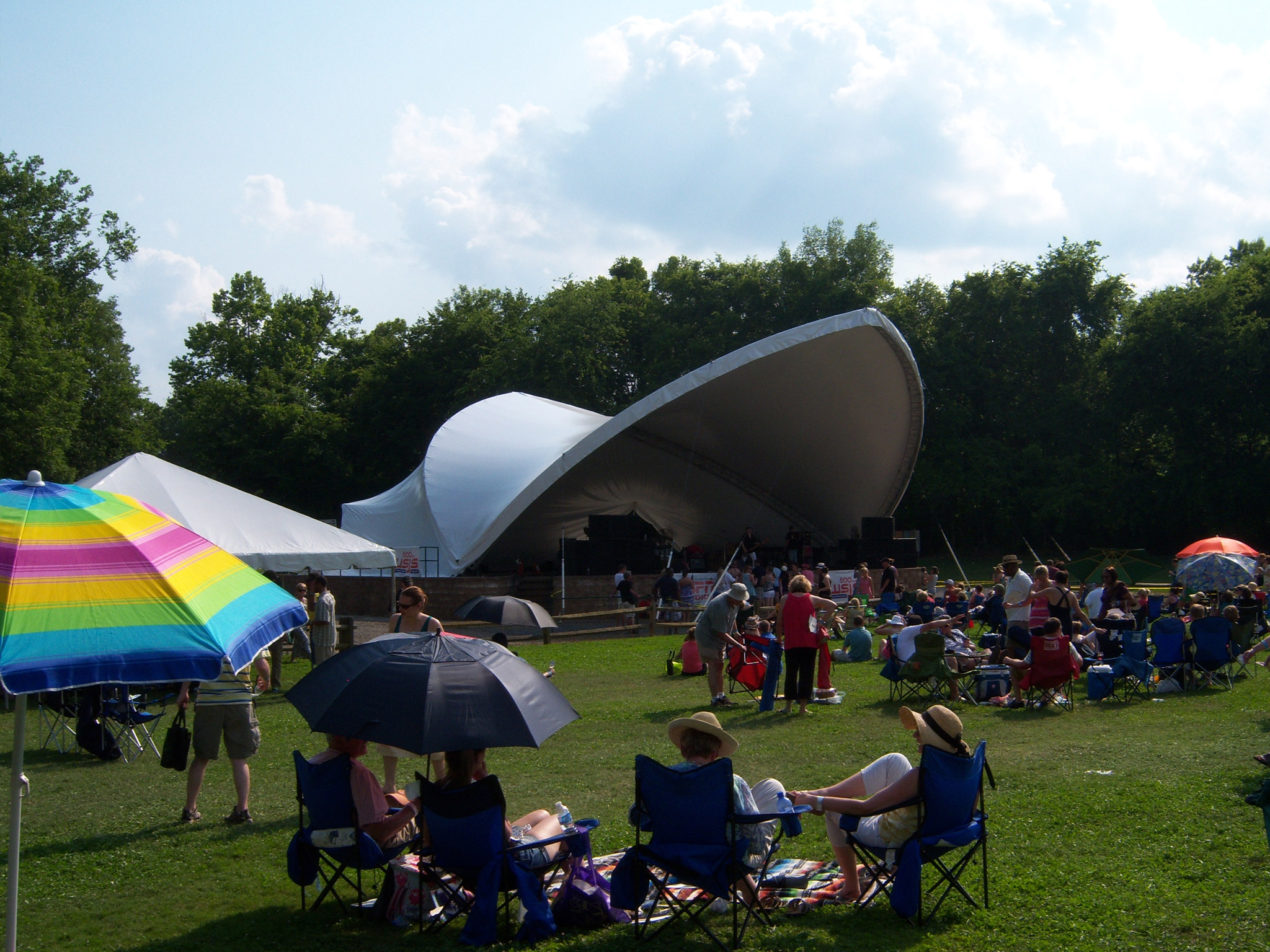
North Carolina Wine Festival participants

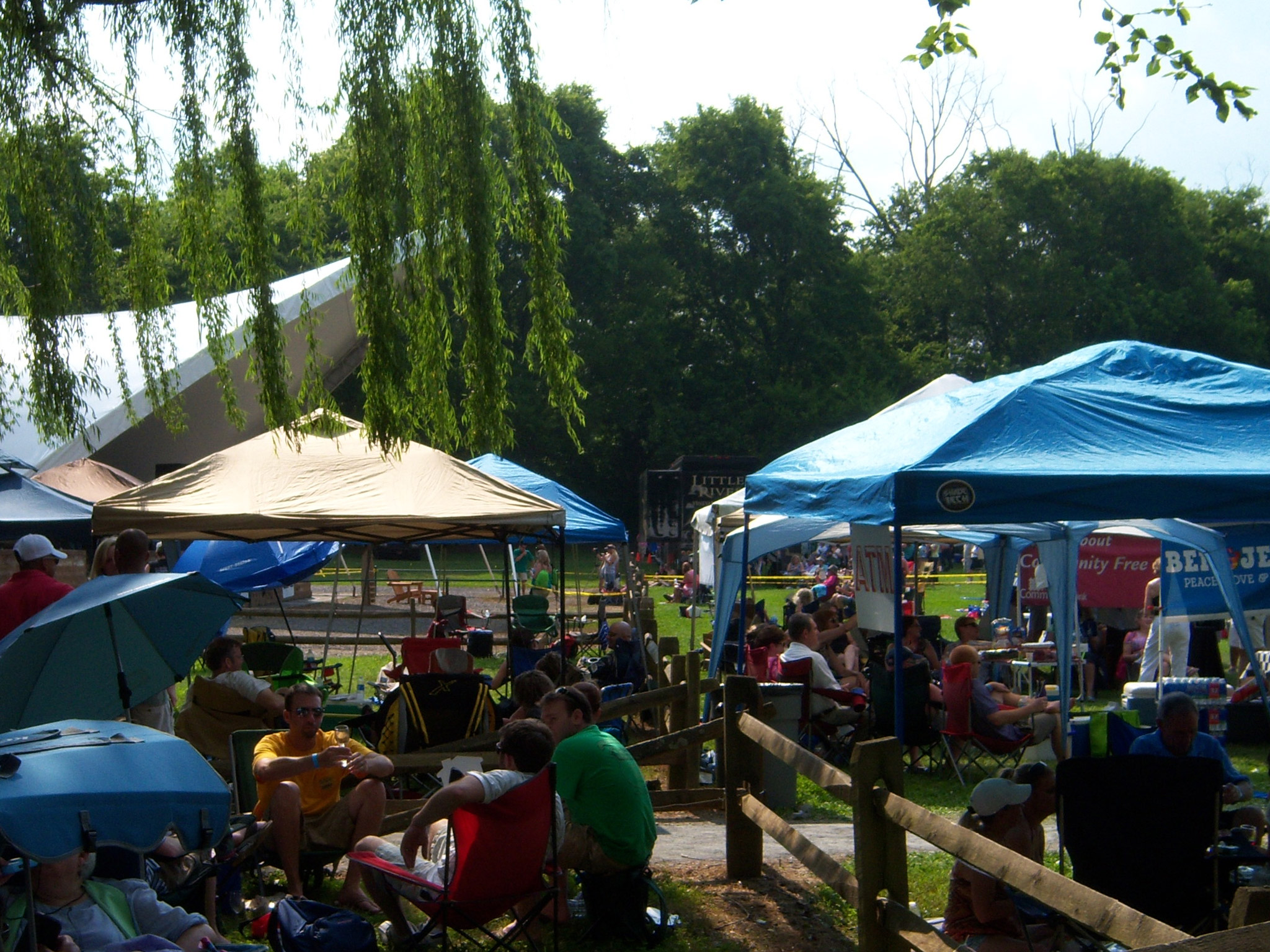
Wine festival in the USA

- Beaujolais Wine Festival, Dallas, Texas
- Boston Wine Festival, Massachusetts
- Cleveland Wine festival, Cleveland, Ohio
- Food Network South Beach Wine and Food Festival, Miami Beach, Florida
- French Quarter Wine Festival, New Orleans, Louisiana
- Hilton Head Island Wine and Food Festival, one of the oldest in the US
- Keystone Wine and Jazz Festival, Keystone, Colorado
- Maryland Wine Festival, Maryland
- Naples Grape Festival, Naples, New York
- North Carolina Wine Festival
- Paso Robles Wine Festival, California
- San Diego Bay Wine & Food Festival, California
- Simply Wine Festival, California
- Oregon Wine Experience, Oregon
- Tallahassee Wine and Food Festival, Florida
- Temecula Valley Balloon & Wine Festival, California
- Vendemmia Festival Philadelphia, Philadelphia, Pennsylvania
- Vendemmia Festival Societa' DaVinci, Wilmington, Delaware

=== Argentinian festivals ===
- Fiesta Nacional de la Vendimia, Mendoza City, Argentina
- Médanos, Buenos Aires, Argentina

=== Other festivals ===
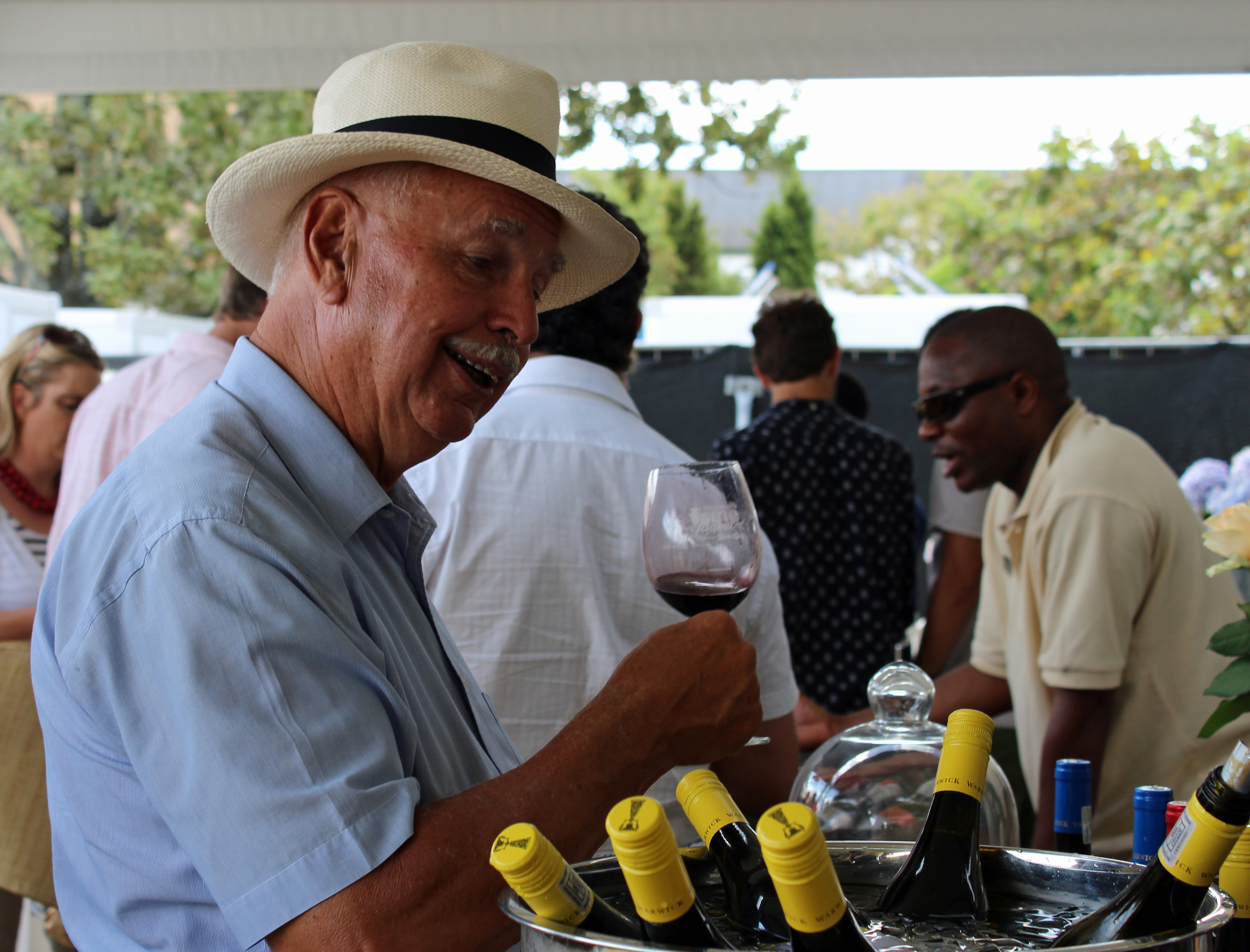
Stellenbosch Wine Festival in South Africa

- Feria Nacional de San Marcos, Aguascalientes, Mexico
- Festival of Wine, United Kingdom
- Haro Wine Festival, Haro, Spain
- Port Wine Fest, Vila Nova de Gaia, Portugal
- Qormi Wine Festival, Malta
- Vendemmia Festival Sicily, Sicily, Italy
- Vineyard Harvest of Surco, Santiago de Surco, Peru
- Wine Festival of Cyprus, Limassol, Republic of Cyprus
- Zielona Góra Wine Fest, Poland

== See also ==
- Bacchanalia
- History of French wine
- Italian wine
