= CUWS =

CUWS may refer to:

- Cambridge University Wine Society
- Cambridge University Wireless Society
- Congressional Union for Woman Suffrage
- Common Use Web Services
