= Varsity blind wine tasting match =

Series of wine tasting competitions

The Varsity Blind Wine Tasting Match is a series of annual competitions in blind wine tasting between the Oxford University Blind Wine Tasting Society and the Cambridge University Blind Wine Tasting Society. The blind wine tasting teams of the University of Edinburgh and the University of St Andrews; and the blind wine tasting teams of the University of Bath and Bristol University. It is sponsored by champagne house Pol Roger. The Oxford/Cambridge competition has run since 1953. The current Oxford/Cambridge convenor is James Simpson, Master of Wine (MW). Will Lyons is a judge for the Edinburgh/St Andrews competition

The winning teams are invited to Épernay, France to visit the vineyards of Pol Roger and compete in an international tasting match against a French university. The taster with the highest individual score wins a bottle of Pol Roger's top cuvee, Sir Winston Churchill. The reserve taster with the higher score wins a subscription to Decanter Magazine. The losing team each win a bottle of Non Vintage Pol Roger.

== Judges ==
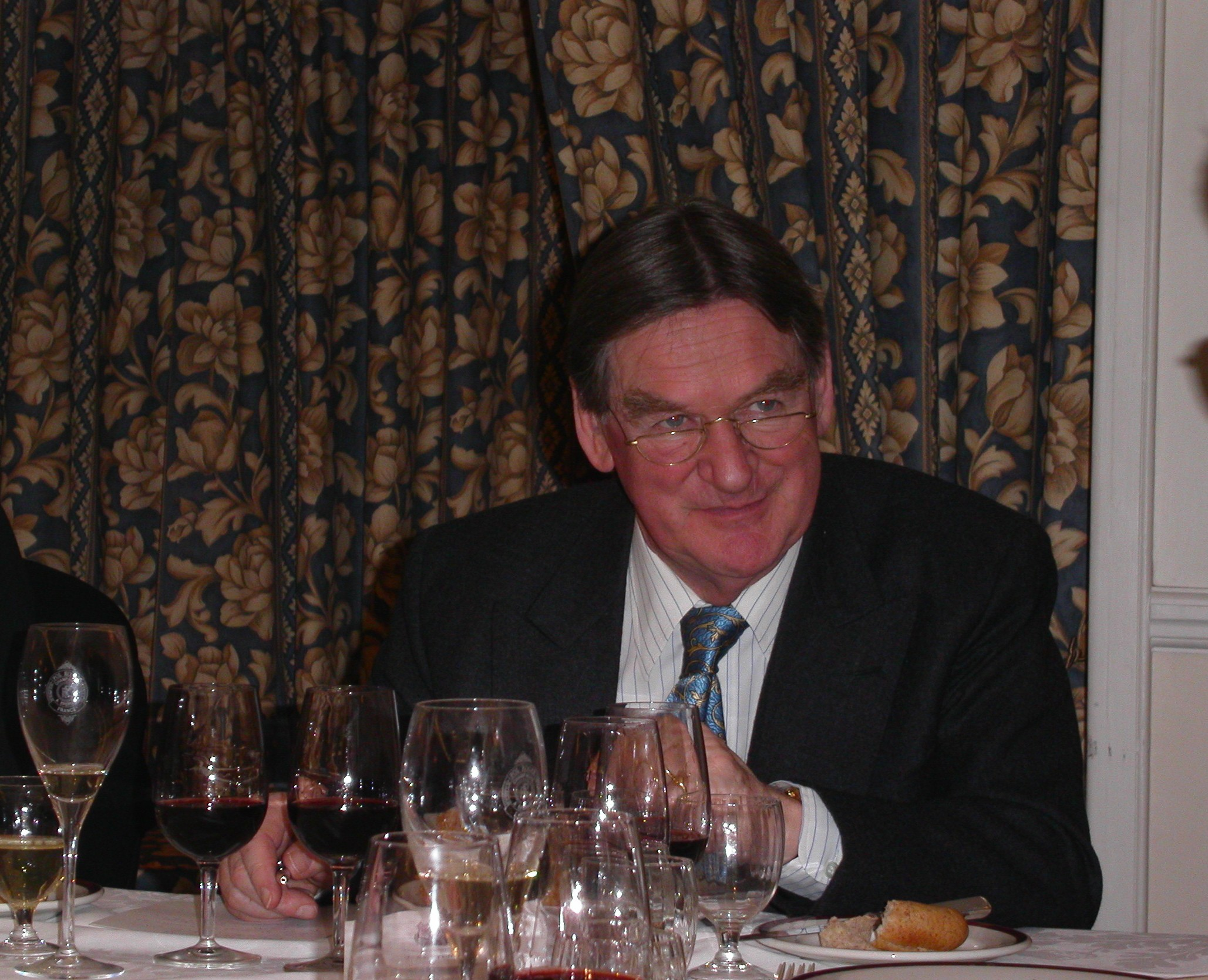
Wine expert Hugh Johnson judging during the 2003 competition.

For the Oxford v Cambridge competition there are two judges, one nominated by each team. In 2008 and 2009, the Oxford judge was Jancis Robinson MW, and the Cambridge judge was Hugh Johnson. Past judges have included Jasper Morris MW (who also judged in 2014). The papers are marked anonymously and cross-checked by both judges in order to ensure impartiality.

== Winners ==
Team Overall Competition Oxford v Cambridge

Cambridge (28 victories in total) including: 1994, 1998, 2004, 2005, 2007, 2009, 2010, 2011, 2014, 2019, 2020, 2022, 2024, 2025

Oxford (43 victories in total) including: 1992, 1993, 1995, 1996, 1997, 1999, 2000, 2001, 2002, 2003, 2006, 2008, 2012, 2013, 2015, 2016, 2017, 2018, 2021, 2023, 2026

Top Individual Tasters

2009: Caroline Conner (Ox)

2010: James Flewellen (Ox)

2011: James Flewellen (Ox), 152 points

2012: Ren Lim (Ox)

2013: Tom Arnold (Ox) and Stefan Kuppen (Cam), 140 points [joint]

2014: Vaiva Imbrasaite (Cam), 195 points

2015: Swii Yii Lim and Yee Chuin Lim (both Ox) [joint]

2016: Qian (Janice) Wang (Ox), 173 points

2017: Jit Hang (Jackie) Ang (Ox), 143 points

2018: Neil Alacha (Ox), 160 points

2019: Emelyn Rude (Cam)

2020: Gianmarco Luppi (Ox)

2021: Yee Kwan Law (Ox)

2022: Emer Jones (Cam)

2023: Ian Cheung (Oxford)

2024: Victoria Phan (Cam)

2025: Mikolaj Poplawski (Oxford)

2026: Julian Leidy (Oxford)

University of Edinburgh v University of St Andrews competition
Year	Winning team	Top Individual Taster
2013	Edinburgh	
2014	Edinburgh	
2015	Edinburgh	Maciej Pajak
2016	Edinburgh	
2017	Edinburgh	
2018	Edinburgh	Megan Haines
2019	Edinburgh	Yu Jin Ooi
2020	Edinburgh	Arthur Ng
2021	St Andrews	Arthur Ng
2022	Edinburgh	Arthur Ng
2023	Edinburgh	Jamie H.M. Stuart-Smith
