= The World Atlas of Wine =

Reference work about wine regions

- Eighth edition cover (UK)
- Author: Hugh Johnson; Jancis Robinson
- Language: English
- Genre: Wine atlas
- Publisher: Mitchell Beazley
- Publication date: October 2019 (eighth edition)
- Publication place: United Kingdom
- Media type: Print (hardcover) & digital
- Pages: 416
- ISBN: 978-1784724030
- OCLC: 213401236

The World Atlas of Wine by Hugh Johnson and (since 2003) Jancis Robinson, MW, is an atlas and reference work on the world of wine, published by Mitchell Beazley. It pioneered the use of wine-specific cartography to give wine a sense of place, and has since the first edition published in 1971 sold 4 million copies in 14 languages. Considered among the most significant wine publications to date, it remains one of the most popular books on wine, with the most recent eighth edition published in October 2019.

== Origin ==
Prior to its publication in 1971, no work of wine literature contained high quality, wine-specific cartography as until World War II, wine was the preserve of the upper classes in western Europe and virtually non-existent in the U.S. With the emergence of mass tourism in the 1950s and the greater spending power of the 1960s, a whole new generation visited France, Italy and Spain, bringing back the continental culture of wine.

With the first edition of The World Atlas of Wine published in 1971, it met a need for universal wine knowledge. The book had little competition until 1988 when The Sotheby's Wine Encyclopedia was published.

The Institut National des Appellations d'Origine, a French governmental organisation that avoids comment on commercial ventures, was moved to describe The World Atlas of Wine upon publication as "a major landmark in the literature of wine".

The distinctive maps for the First Edition of the Atlas were drawn by Fairey Surveys Ltd Cartographic office in Maidenhead, UK. Although many maps have been added in later editions many of the original maps of the classic wine areas are still used in the current edition.

== Printing history ==
- First Edition (1971)
- Second Edition (1977)
- Third Edition (1985)
- Fourth Edition (1994)
- Fifth Edition (2001)
- Sixth Edition (2007)
- Seventh Edition (2013)
- Eighth Edition (2019)
- Ninth Edition (2026)
