= Rheingauer Weinwoche =

Coordinates: 50.0819°N 8.2414°E

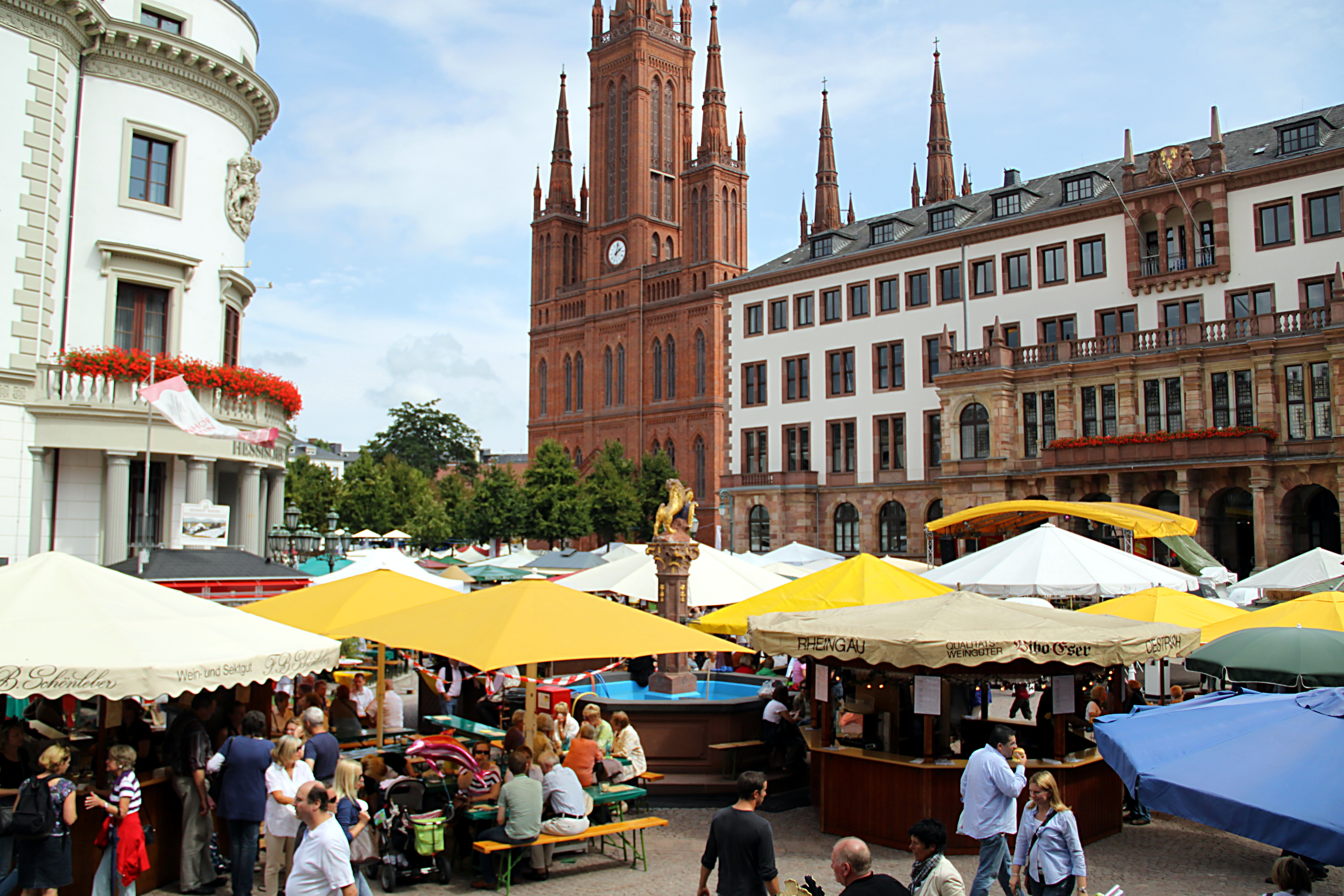
Rheingauer Weinwoche in 2011

The Rheingauer Weinwoche (literally Rheingau Wine Week) in Wiesbaden, commonly known as Weinfest, takes place annually from the second Friday in August for ten consecutive days on the Palace Square, in front of City Hall. The "longest wine bar in the world" is also measured at the 118 stalls (including 98 wine stands) and Marktkirche stages for music.

Traditionally, there is only one beer stall, namely the "Ratskeller" in the basement of the City Hall. The Rheingau Wine Festival attracts more than 400,000 visitors annually.
