= Cambridge University Wine Society =

Student society

The Cambridge University Wine Society (CUWS; formerly known as the Cambridge University Wine and Food Society) is a traditional membership club, one of the Registered Clubs & Societies of University of Cambridge, England, founded in 1792. The society aims to introduce university students to the world of wine through regular tastings during the academic term, and other activities and events. Membership is open to the public.

A number of past members have entered the international wine trade. Prominent wine writer Hugh Johnson joined as an undergraduate at King's College, Cambridge in the 1950s, with his roommate and fellow member Adrian Cowell.

In January 2013 the Society marked the 350th anniversary of the day diarist Samuel Pepys "drank a sort of French wine called Ho Bryan, that hath a good and most particular taste that I never met with." Pepys graduated from Magdalene College in 1654.

Members of Cambridge University Blind Wine Tasting Society (CUBWTS) participate in the annual Varsity blind wine tasting match, sponsored by Pol Roger, and other blind wine tasting competitions. The history of these competitions were described in detail in the 2013 book "Reds, Whites & Varsity Blues: 60 years of the Oxford & Cambridge Blind Wine-Tasting Competition".

== CUWS alumni ==
Notable alumni include:

- Hugh Johnson, wine writer
- David Peppercorn, wine writer, president of the society (cellarer) in 1952
- Robin Don, Master of Wine
- Julian Jeffs
- John H. Plumb, historian
- Denis Mack Smith, historian
- Tom King, Baron King of Bridgwater
- James Cropper, businessman
