= Sodom, or the Quintessence of Debauchery =

Play published in 1684

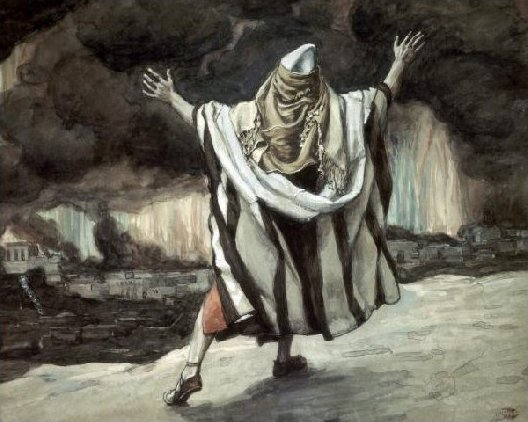
Abraham Sees Sodom in Flames, circa 1896–1902, by James Jacques Joseph Tissot (French, 1836-1902)

Sodom, or the Quintessence of Debauchery is an obscene Restoration closet drama, published in 1684. The work has been attributed to John Wilmot, 2nd Earl of Rochester, though its authorship is disputed. Rochester had died in 1680; determining the date of composition and attribution are complicated owing mostly to misattribution of evidence for and against Rochester's authorship in Restoration and later texts.

== Plot ==
The play consists of five acts in rhyming couplets. There are two prologues, two epilogues and a short final speech. The play begins with Bolloxinion, King of Sodom, authorising same-sex sodomy as an acceptable sexual practice within the realm. General Buggeranthos reports that this policy is welcomed by the soldiers, who spend less on prostitutes as a consequence, but has deleterious effects on women of the kingdom who have recourse to "dildoes and dogs". Prince Pricket and Princess Swivia commit incest with one another. With the court and country reduced to erotic madness, the court physician counsels: "Fuck women, and let Bugg'ry be no more". The king himself, however is unconvinced, while the Queen dies of venereal disease. Amid the appearance of demons, fire, and brimstone, Bolloxinion declares his intention to retire to a cavern and die in the act of sodomising his favourite – Pockenello.

== Cast ==
- Bolloxinion – King of Sodom
- Cuntigratia – his Queen
- Pricket – young Prince
- Swivia – Princess
- Buggeranthos – General of the Army
- Pockenello – Prince and favourite of the King
- Borastus – Buggermaster-General
- Pene & Tooly – Pimps of Honour
- Officina – Maid of Honour
- Fuckadilla – Maid of Honour
- Cunticulla – Maid of Honour
- Clytoris – Maid of Honour
- Flux – Physician to the King
- Vertuso – Dildo- and Merkin-Maker for the Court

== Interpretation ==
Sodom merits attention not just as an historical piece of scabrous literature, but also as a disguised satire on the court of Charles II and especially of his apparent willingness to tolerate Catholicism in England at a time when that religion was officially proscribed. Written presumably at the time of Charles's 1672 Declaration of Indulgence (which promulgated official toleration of Catholics and others), Sodom delineates in its racy plot a king much like Charles whose insistence on promoting his sexual preference for sodomy can be read as an analogue to the debate in England at the time about the king's real motive in pushing religious toleration.

== Performance history ==
Sodom is popularly classified as closet drama, which means it has not had a major performance for centuries. The play was publicly performed in 1986 for six weekends at Broom Street Theater in Madison, Wisconsin. Sodom was revived at the Edinburgh Fringe Festival in 2011 by the Movement Theatre Company, in what is described as a "reconstructed" version. The play was revived in a cabaret-burlesque adaptation by Nikita Matthews at the Edinburgh Fringe Festival in August 2026.

== Modern media ==
In the film The Libertine, Johnny Depp, as Rochester, is seen staging Sodom in front of an outraged Charles II, with Rochester taking the role of the King of Sodom.

In the 2002 video game Progress Quest, one of the largest guilds is named after the play's subtitle, "Quintessence of Debauchery".
