= Zielona Góra Wine Fest =

Annual wine festival held in Zielona Góra, Poland

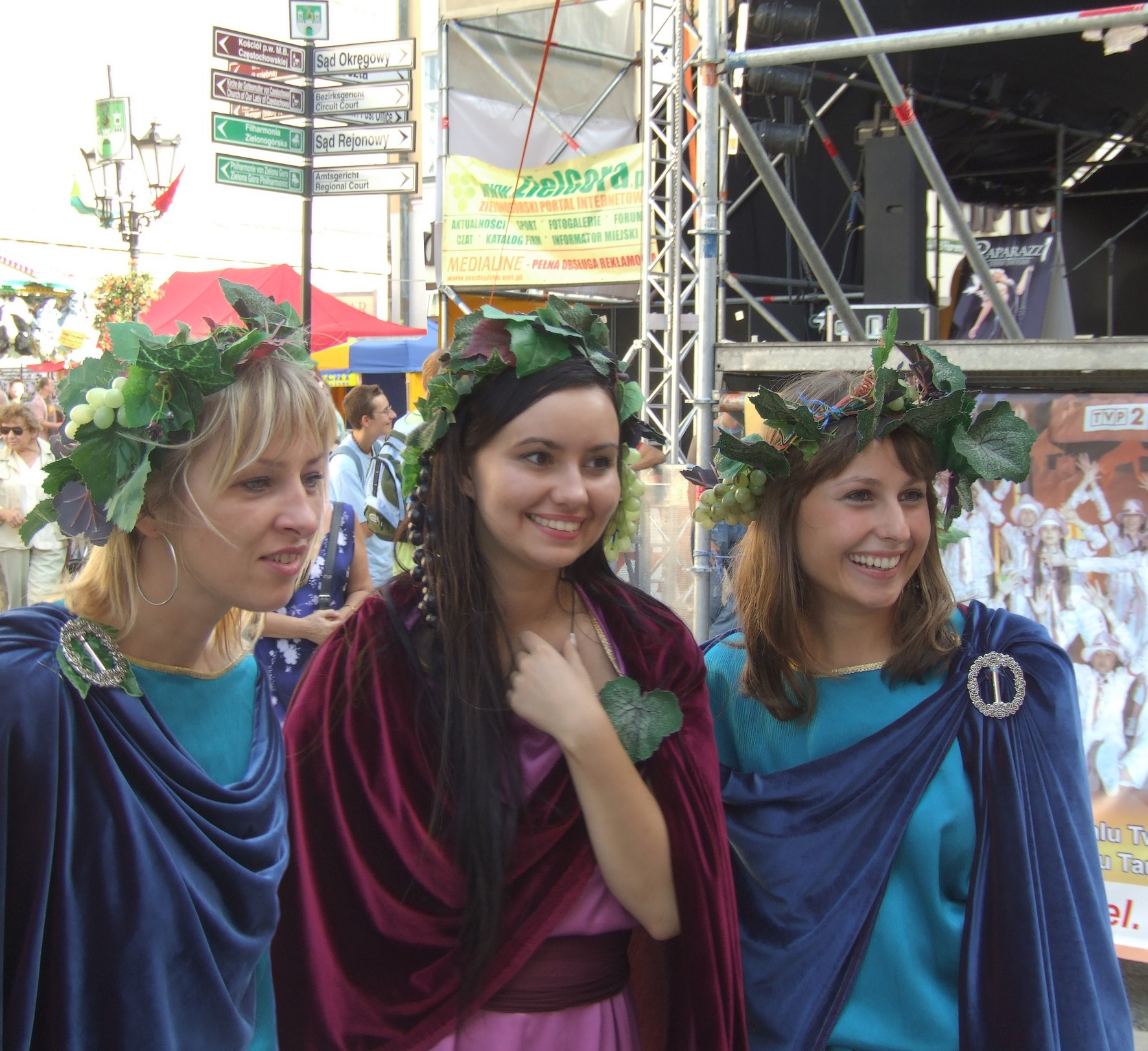
The Maenads

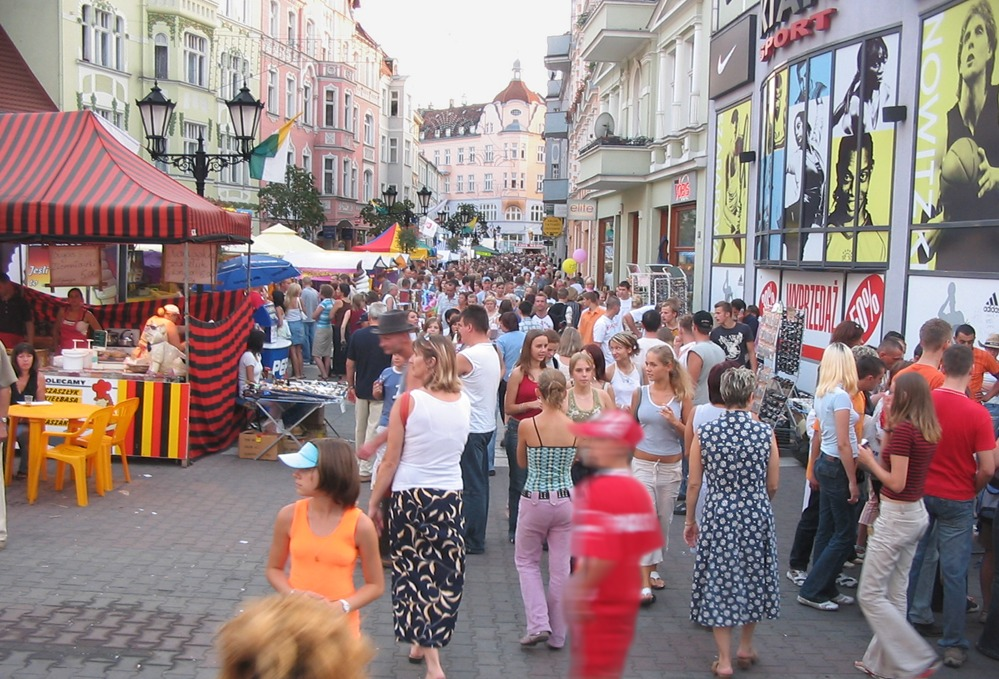
The city centre during the fest

The Zielona Góra Wine Fest (Polish: Winobranie w Zielonej Górze) is a wine festival held in the Polish town of Zielona Góra. The tradition is related to the period of harvest of grapes from the local vineyards which were then turned into wine. The first festival took place in October 1852. Nowadays it starts in the first or second week of September and lasts for nine days.

The festivities starts on a Saturday with a parade through the city centre. It is preceded by a symbolic ceremony when the Roman wine god Bacchus and his Maenads receive the keys to the town from the local authorities. During the nine days a lot of cultural and sport events take place, among which the International Festival of Folklore is one of the most prominent. There are also theatre meetings (including street theatres) and music concerts.

The centre of the town turns into a big marketplace for the time of the fest, with a separate street allotted for the antiques market.
