= Dolní Němčí =

- Municipality
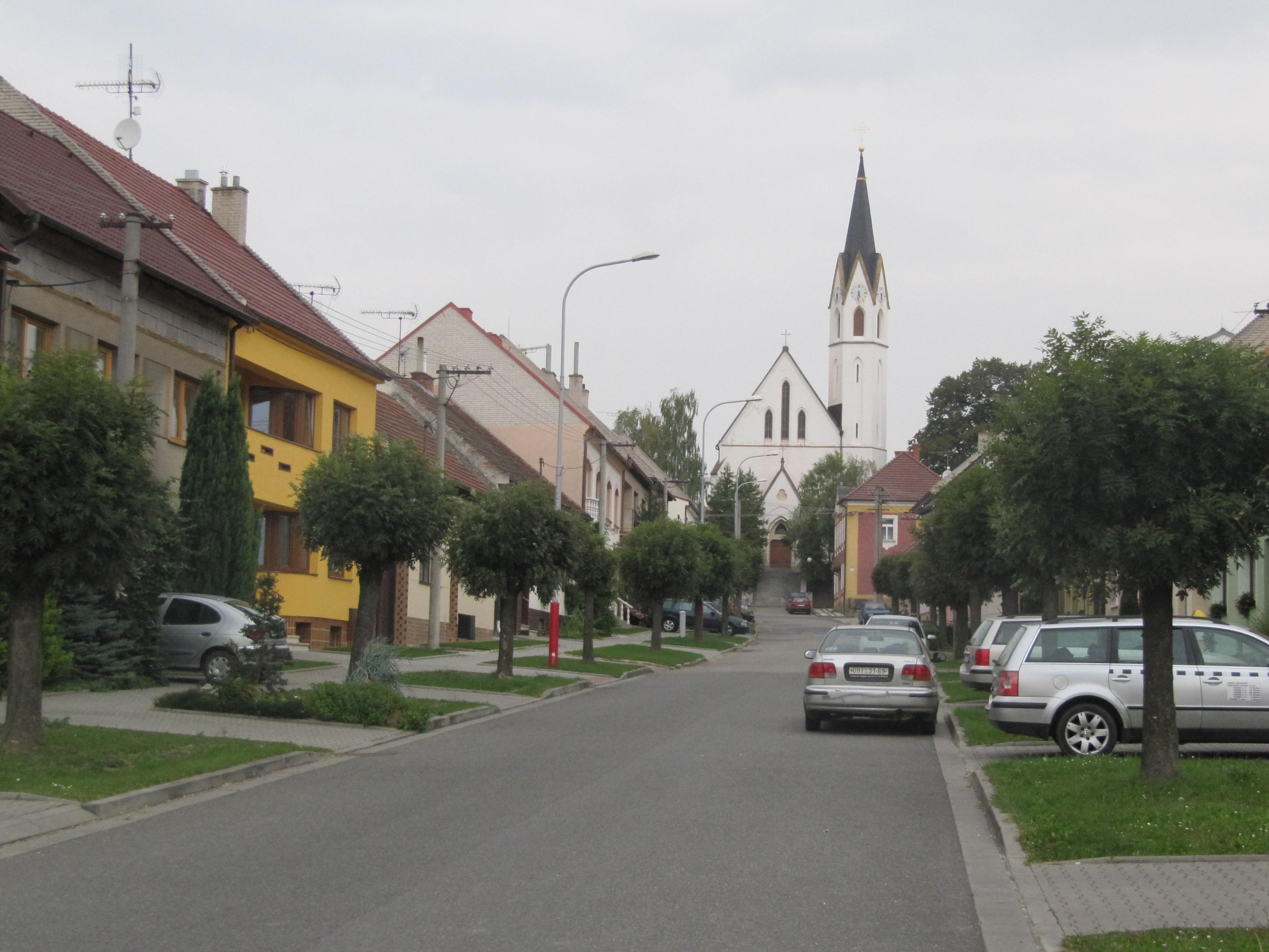
- Church of Saints Philip and James

- Flag Coat of arms

- Location in the Czech Republic
- Coordinates: 48°58′6″N 17°35′9″E
- Country: Czech Republic
- Region: Zlín
- District: Uherské Hradiště
- First mentioned: 1358

Area
  - Total: 9.88 km^{2} (3.81 sq mi)
- Elevation: 256 m (840 ft)

Population (2026-01-01)
  - Total: 2,847
  - Density: 288/km^{2} (746/sq mi)
- Time zone: UTC+1 (CET)
  - Summer (DST): UTC+2 (CEST)
- Postal code: 687 62
- Website: www.dolni-nemci.cz

Dolní Němčí (until 1925 Dolněmčí) is a municipality and village in Uherské Hradiště District in the Zlín Region of the Czech Republic. It has about 2,800 inhabitants.

== Etymology ==
The name Němčí is probably derived from the Czech word Němci (i.e. 'Germans') and refers to the first settlers of the area. The prefix dolní means 'lower' and distinguishes it from nearby Horní Němčí ('upper Němčí').

== Geography ==
Dolní Němčí is located about 14 kilometres (9 mi) southeast of Uherské Hradiště and 29 km (18 mi) south of Zlín. It lies in the Vizovice Highlands. The highest point is at 365 m (1,198 ft) above sea level.

== History ==
The first written mention of Němčí is from 1261. The villages of Dolní Němčí and Horní Němčí were first distinguished in 1437.

== Demographics ==
Historical population

Year	Pop.	±%
1869	676	—
1880	796	+17.8%
1890	899	+12.9%
1900	1,062	+18.1%
1910	1,154	+8.7%

Year	Pop.	±%
1921	1,343	+16.4%
1930	1,513	+12.7%
1950	1,799	+18.9%
1961	2,250	+25.1%
1970	2,385	+6.0%

Year	Pop.	±%
1980	2,696	+13.0%
1991	2,956	+9.6%
2001	3,016	+2.0%
2011	2,975	−1.4%
2021	2,761	−7.2%

Source: Censuses

== Culture ==
Dolní Němčí lies in the ethnographic region of Moravian Slovakia. The municipality is known for the foklore group NK Dolněmčan, which was established in 1965.

== Sights ==
The main landmark of Dolní Němčí is the Church of Saints Philip and James. It was built in the neo-Gothic style in 1870–1873.
