= Horní Němčí =

- Municipality
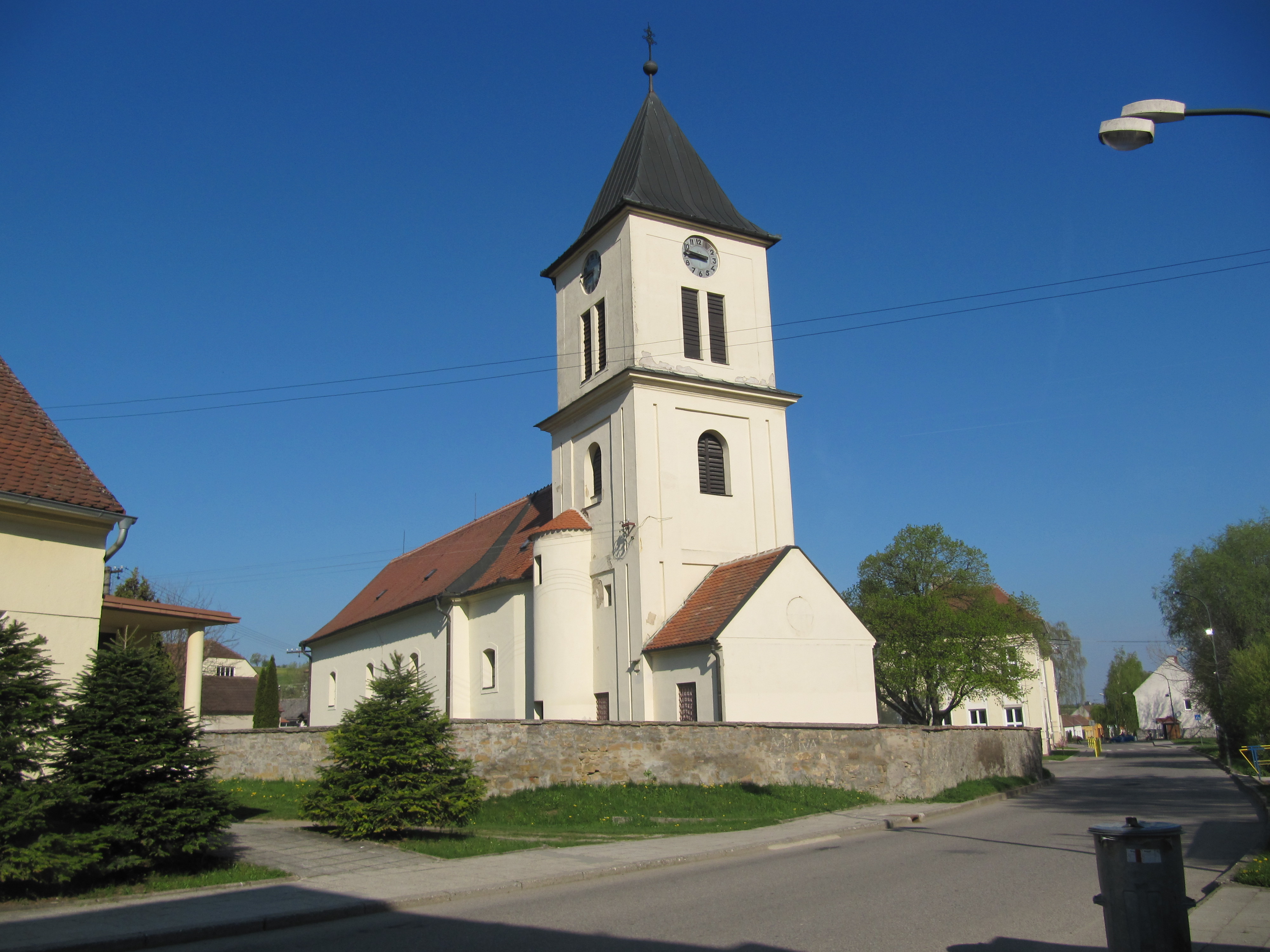
- Church of Saints Peter and Paul

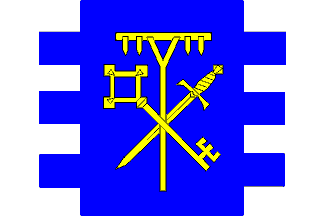
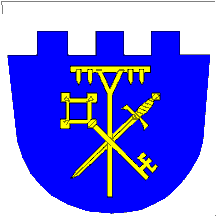
- Flag Coat of arms

- Location in the Czech Republic
- Coordinates: 48°55′59″N 17°37′27″E
- Country: Czech Republic
- Region: Zlín
- District: Uherské Hradiště
- First mentioned: 1261

Area
  - Total: 17.93 km^{2} (6.92 sq mi)
- Elevation: 334 m (1,096 ft)

Population (2026-01-01)
  - Total: 807
  - Density: 45.0/km^{2} (117/sq mi)
- Time zone: UTC+1 (CET)
  - Summer (DST): UTC+2 (CEST)
- Postal code: 687 64
- Website: www.horninemci.cz

Horní Němčí is a municipality and village in Uherské Hradiště District in the Zlín Region of the Czech Republic. It has about 800 inhabitants.

Horní Němčí lies approximately 20 kilometres (12 mi) south-east of Uherské Hradiště, 41 km (25 mi) south of Zlín, and 297 km (185 mi) south-east of Prague.

== Demographics ==
Historical population
Year	Pop.	±%
1869	920	—
1880	919	−0.1%
1890	1,067	+16.1%
1900	1,168	+9.5%
1910	1,310	+12.2%
1921	1,344	+2.6%
1930	1,369	+1.9%
1950	1,082	−21.0%
1961	1,172	+8.3%
1970	1,082	−7.7%
1980	947	−12.5%
1991	866	−8.6%
2001	829	−4.3%
2011	829	+0.0%
2021	784	−5.4%
Source: Censuses
