= Hugh Johnson (wine writer) =

British author and expert on wine (born 1939)

Hugh Johnson OBE
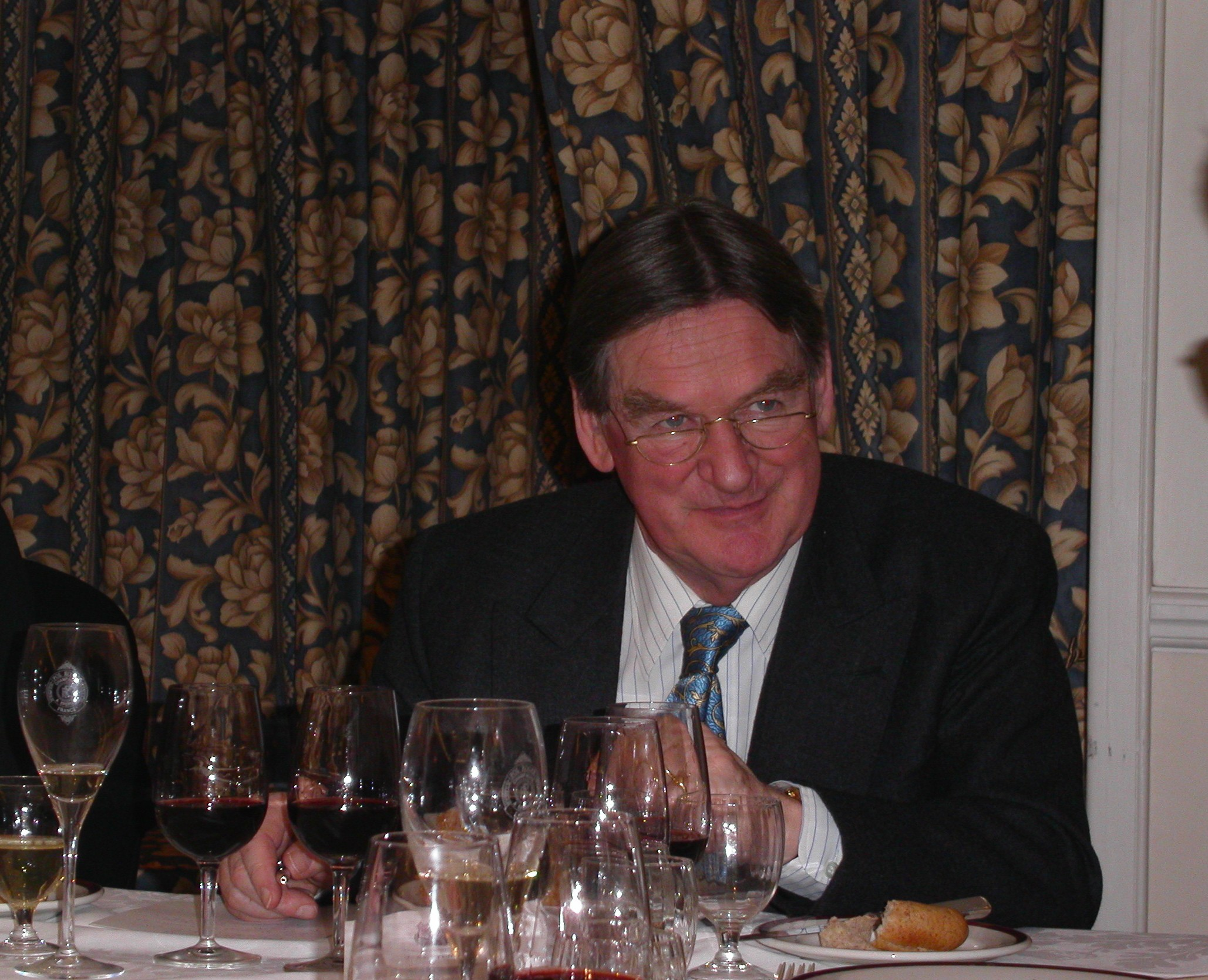
- Hugh Johnson in 2003
- Born: Hugh Eric Allan Johnson; 10 March 1939 (age 87); London, England
- Occupation: Writer
- Writing career
- Subjects: Wine, Gardening
- Website: tradsdiary.com

Hugh Eric Allan Johnson OBE (born 10 March 1939, in London) is an English journalist, author, editor, and expert on wine. He is considered the world's best-selling wine writer. A wine he tasted in 1964, a 1540 Steinwein from the German vineyard Würzburger Stein, is considered one of the oldest to have ever been tasted.

He is a keen gardener, and has written books and columns on gardening for many years.

== Early life ==
He was born the son of Grace (Enid) Kittel and Guy F. Johnson CBE. He was educated at Rugby School and studied English at King's College, Cambridge.

== Career ==
Johnson became a member of the Cambridge University Wine and Food Society while an undergraduate in the 1950s. On describing his introduction to wine-tasting Johnson has recalled:

...my room-mate Adrian Cowell, committee member of the University Wine & Food Society came in after dinner with two glasses and said, "Come on, Hugh, are they the same? Or different?" Both were, I am sure, red Burgundy, but one was magic and one was ordinary. This caught my imagination. It was my Damascene moment.

Johnson has been writing about wine since 1960, was taken on as a feature writer for Condé Nast Publications upon graduation, and started work on Vogue and House & Garden, becoming in 1962 editor of Wine & Food and in the same year wine correspondent of The Sunday Times, of which in 1967 he became Travel Editor. From 1968 to 1970 he edited Queen magazine in succession to Jocelyn Stevens.

He has published a wide array of books, starting with the publication of Wine in 1966. The World Atlas of Wine (1971) was considered the first serious attempt to map the world's wine regions, described by the director of the INAO as "a major event in wine literature".

Since its launch in 1973 Johnson has been President of the Sunday Times Wine Club, part of Laithwaites, now the world's largest mail-order wine merchant. From 1986 to 2001 he was a Director of the Bordeaux First Growth Chateau Latour and in 1990 was a co-founder of the Royal Tokaji Wine Company in an attempt to rebuild the foundering Tokaji industry after Communism. In 1986 he started the Hugh Johnson Collection, which sold (until 2010) wine glasses and other artefacts related to wine, mainly in the Far East, with a shop in St James's Street, London.

His book Vintage: The Story of Wine, an authoritative 500-page compendium, was first published in 1989 by Octopus, and re-edited in 2004 as a fully illustrated edition published by Mitchell Beazley. It also was made into a 13-part TV series for Channel 4 and WGBH in Boston, first airing in 1989. Since 1977 he has compiled his annual Pocket Wine Book, selling many million copies in up to 14 languages.

In 1973 Johnson wrote The International Book of Trees. In 1975 he became Editorial Director of the journal of the Royal Horticultural Society (The Garden) and its columnist, "Tradescant". "Trad's Diary", now in its 44th year, appears online and in Hortus magazine. In 1979 he published The Principles of Gardening and in 2010 a new rewritten edition of Trees. "Trad's Diary" has been anthologised three times, as Hugh Johnson on Gardening (1993), Hugh Johnson in the Garden (2009) and Sitting in the Shade (2021).

He was selected Decanter Man of the Year in 1995, and was promoted Officer in the French Order Nationale du Mérite in 2004 and Officer of the Order of the British Empire (OBE) in 2007 "for services to wine-making and horticulture". He was awarded the Veitch Memorial Medal of the Royal Horticultural Society in 2000.

Johnson is known as one of the wine world's most vocal opponents to awarding numerical scores to wine. In the autobiography A Life Uncorked, he also expressed regret over the wine critic Robert Parker's influence on the world of wine, which has in his view moved winemaking in many regions towards a more uniform, bigger and richer style. In 2005 Johnson stated, "Imperial hegemony lives in Washington and the dictator of taste in Baltimore".^{[a]}

== Personal life ==
In 1965, he married Judith Eve Grinling and together they had two daughters and a son.

== Selected publications ==
- Wine (1966)
- The World Atlas of Wine (1971, eight editions; since 2004 co-authored with Jancis Robinson)
- Trees – A Lifetime's Journey through Forests, Woods and Gardens (2010)
- Hugh Johnson's Pocket Wine Book (1977, since published annually)
- The Principles of Gardening (1979), Mitchell Beazley Publishers (UK)/Simon & Schuster, Inc. (US)
- Hugh Johnson's Wine Companion (1983, six editions)
- The Story of Wine (1989), and illustrated re-edition (2004), Mitchell Beazley/Octopus, London, UK, 2020 edition, Academie du Vin Library, London, UK
- The Art and Science of Wine (1992, co-authored with James Halliday)
- Hugh Johnson on Gardening: the best of Tradescant's Diary (Royal Horticultural Society, 1993)
- A Life Uncorked (2006, autobiography, anecdotes and opinions), republished with additions as 'My Life and Wines' Academie de Vin Library 2022).
- Hugh Johnson in the Garden (2009)
- Hugh Johnson's Wine Guide 2012, iPhone app (2010)
- Sitting in the Shade (A third anthology of Trad's Diary, 2021)

=== Television ===
- Vintage: A History of Wine (1989)

== See also ==
- List of wine personalities
