= Yerevan Wine Days =

Street event in Yerevan, Armenia

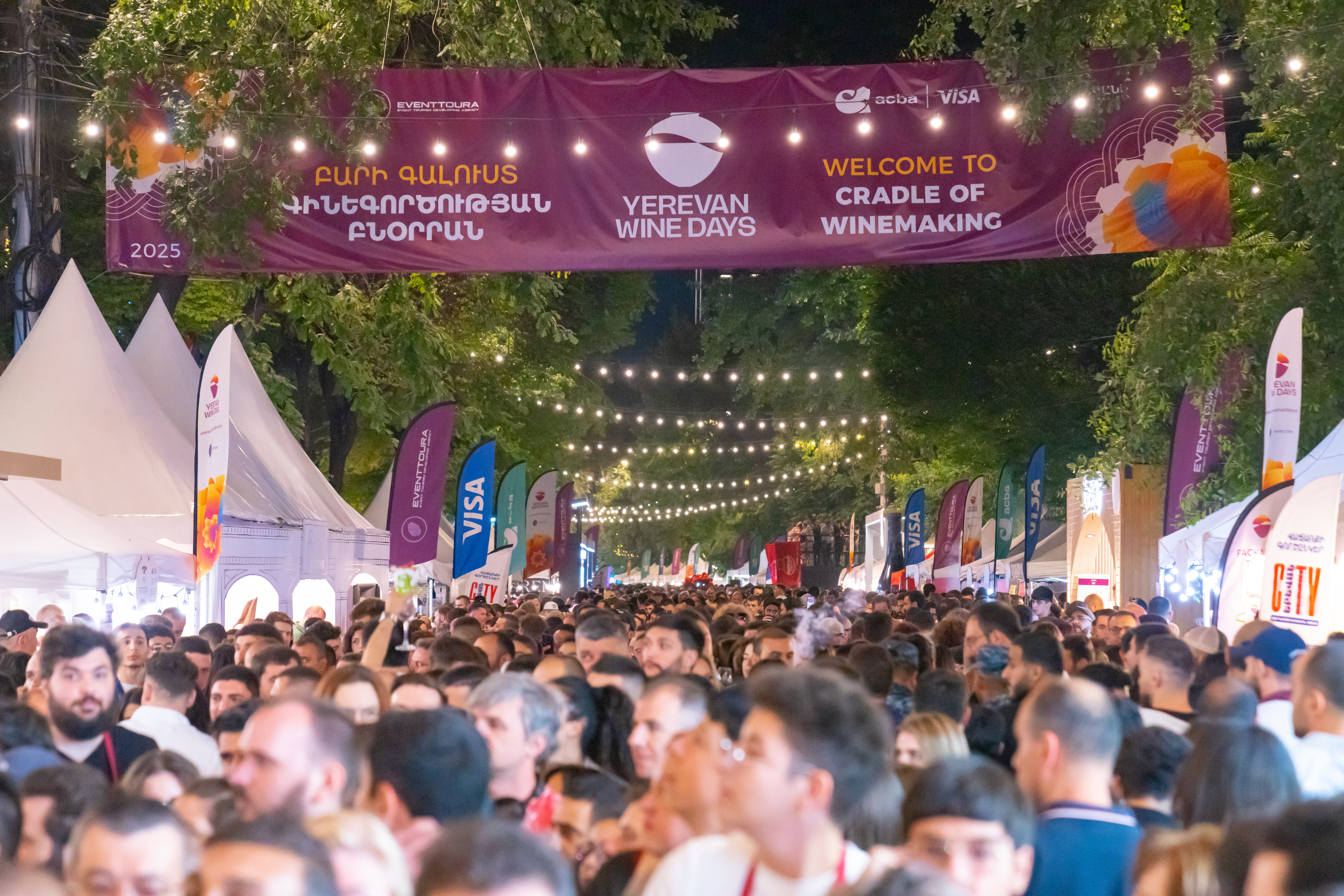
- The festival in 2025
- Dates: The first weekend of June, June 5–7, 2026
- Locations: Yerevan, Armenia
- Years active: 2017–present
- Organizer: EventToura
- Website: yerewinedays.am

Yerevan Wine Days (arm. Երևանի Գինու Օրեր) is an annual international street festival in Yerevan, Armenia dedicated to winemaking. The festival was launched in 2017 and is organized by the EventToura Company. It takes place every year on the first Friday, Saturday, and Sunday of June, on Yerevan's central streets — Saryan, Tumanyan, and Moskovyan. In 2026, the event will be held from June 5 to 7.

Yerevan Wine Days is unique in its format across the region and has become not only a leading platform for event tourism, but also one of Armenia's most important economic and cultural events. In 2025, the festival welcomed around 180,000 visitors, including approximately 40% tourists.

== Purpose ==
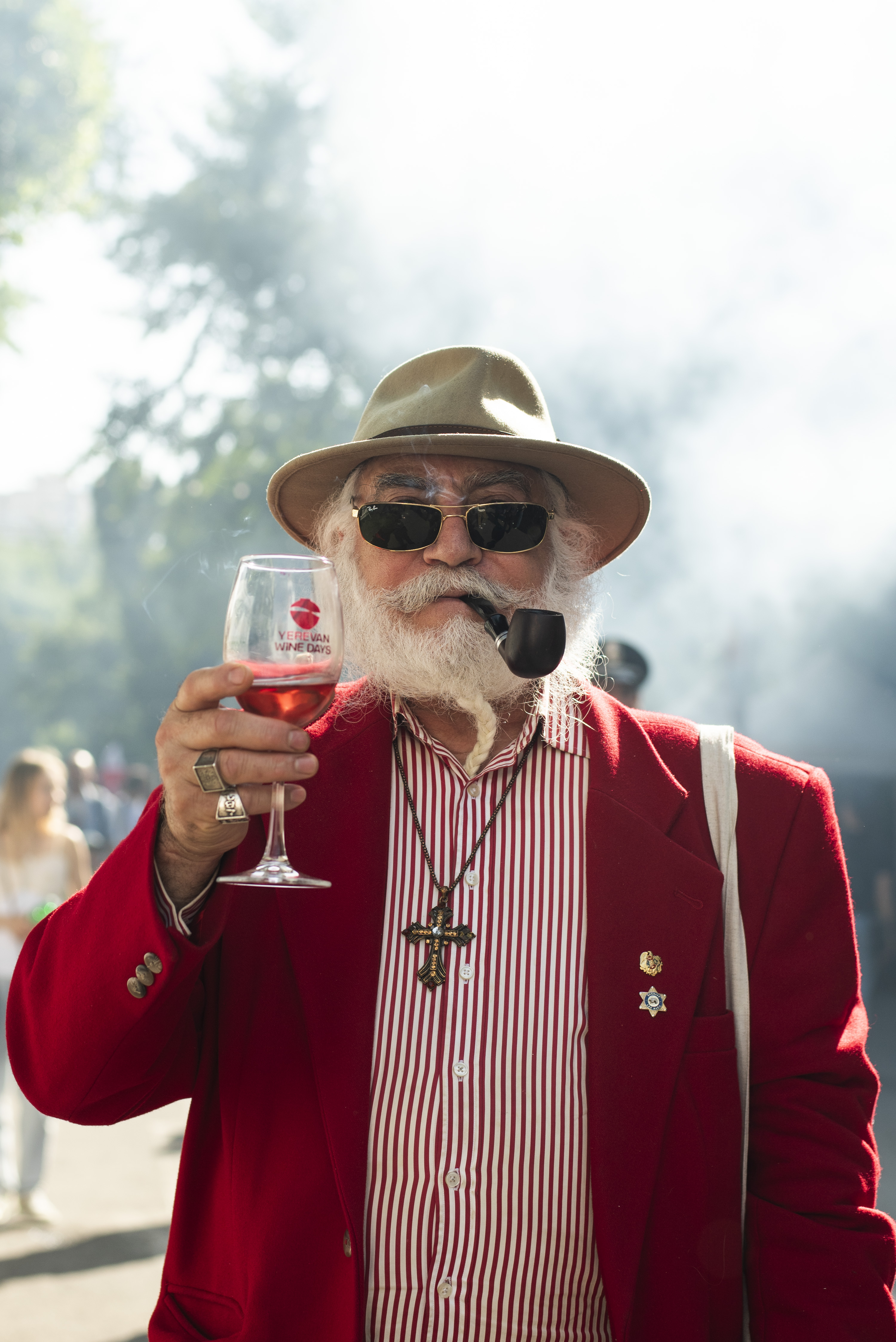
Yerevan Wine Days visitor

The goal of the festival is to promote wine tourism in Armenia and increase the country's recognition as one of the ancient cradles of winemaking. By developing event tourism, the festival aims to popularize Armenian winemaking traditions, support the advancement of local wine producers, and create a sustainable platform for collaboration between winemakers, consumers, and international tourists.

The festival has a multifaceted economic, cultural, and social impact. Year after year, it contributes to the growth of tourism, which in turn improves the business environment for local enterprises, enhances the country's reputation, and ensures financial inflow. According to official data, the Yerevan Wine Days festival has had a positive influence on the development of Armenia's wine industry, contributing to the expansion of vineyard areas, grape harvest volumes, and wine production.

For example, following 2017 — the year the festival started being held regularly — a significant increase in vineyard acreage was recorded. Growth was already evident in 2017 and 2018 compared to 2016, the year before the festival's launch. In parallel, both grape procurement and wine production volumes grew, indicating an upward trend in the industry.

In addition to promoting wine consumption culture, the festival has played a key role in stimulating Armenia's economic development. By establishing a platform for event tourism, the festival generates substantial economic inflow and encourages investment in both the tourism and winemaking sectors. By increasing demand for Armenian wine and related products, the festival has created opportunities for local producers to gain international exposure and enter export markets. Yerevan Wine Days has become a unique “window to the world,” strengthening the global competitiveness of Armenian wine.

== Festival agenda ==
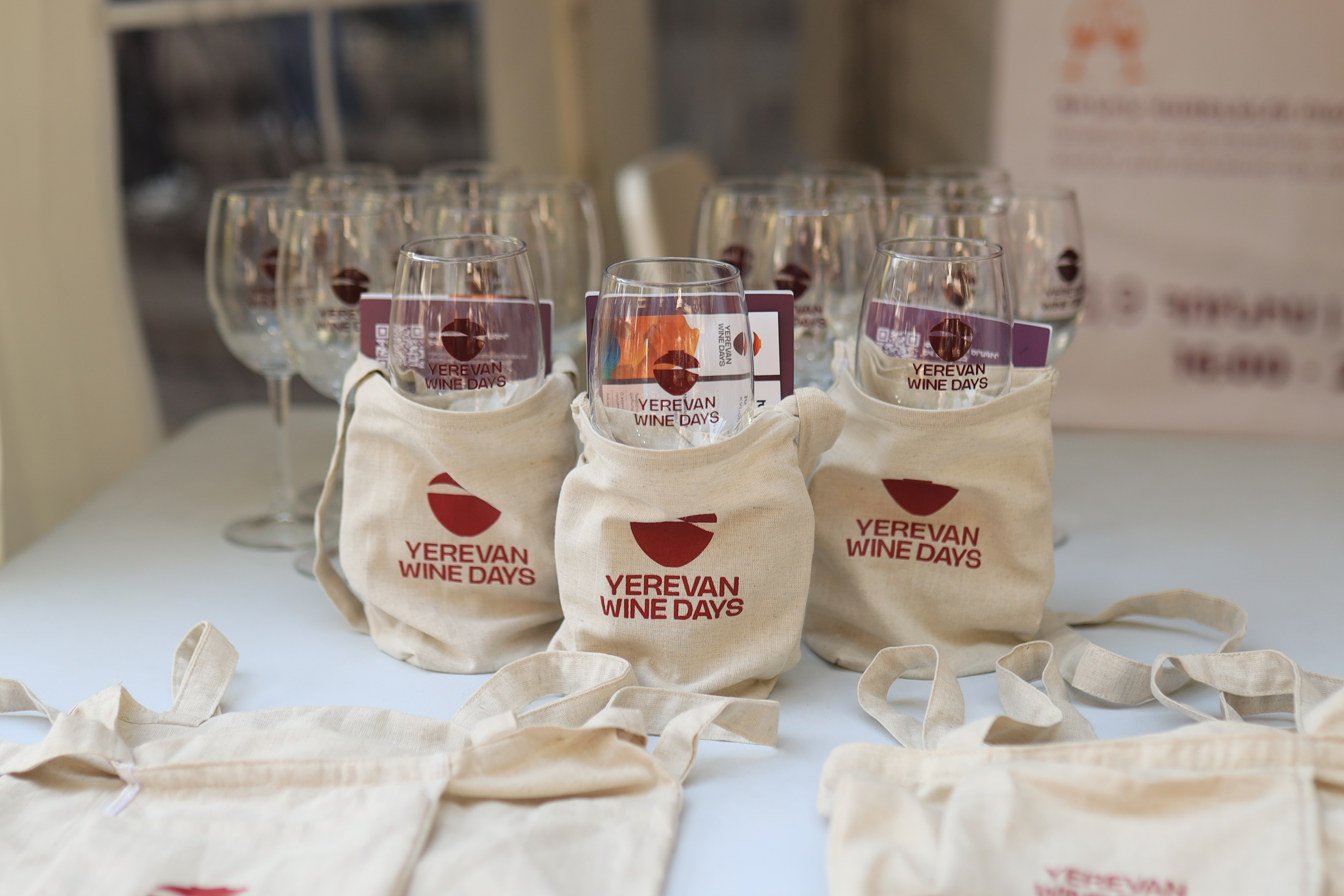
Wine enjoying package

At Yerevan Wine Days, wine-loving tourists and locals are offered a wide selection of options — to taste the finest wines made from indigenous Armenian grape varieties and enjoy the full flavor spectrum of white, red, and rosé wines, paired with their favorite Armenian delicacies, cheese assortments, and/or snacks from various international cuisines.

Entrance to the event is free. However, to taste the wines presented, visitors need to purchase special Wine Enjoying Packages. These packages include a The Wine Days-branded glass, 12 tickets, branded wine case, an informational booklet containing detailed information about participating winemakers, a raffle ticket, gifts and special offers from partners, museum campaigns. All of this is accompanied by diverse music performances from top bands and DJs.

== Festival zone ==
The Yerevan Wine Days festival is divided into four main zones, each designed to provide visitors with a complete, comfortable, and diverse experience. Each zone has its own functional and specialized purpose.

=== Wine tasting zones ===
This is the main part of the festival, where over 700 varieties of Armenian and imported wine are presented. Visitors have the opportunity to taste hundreds of wines made from local and traditional grape varieties. Visitors can explore the winemakers' booths by purchasing a 'Wine Enjoyment Package'. The number of winemakers represented in the Wine Zone increases year by year, reflecting the growth of the industry and the trust in the festival.

- In 2017 – 25 winemaking companies
- In 2018 – 35 winemaking companies
- In 2019 – 40 winemaking companies
- In 2022 – more than 50 winemaking companies
- In 2023 – 70 winemaking companies
- In 2024 – up to 80 winemaking companies participated, including both small family-owned wineries and large-scale producers.

This growth reflects not only the active development of Armenian winemaking but also the reputation of the "Yerevan Wine Days" festival as an effective platform for collaboration. The Wine Zone also serves as a B2B platform, where winemakers have the opportunity to meet international suppliers, importers, HoReCa representatives, and tour operators. These meetings often lead to long-term partnerships and new export opportunities, opening pathways to new markets for Armenian wine.

=== Gastronomy Zones ===
The Gastronomy Zone perfectly complements the wine tasting by offering a wide variety of delicious wine and food pairings.Over 30 restaurants take part in the festival, offering a blend of traditional Armenian dishes alongside a range of well-known international dishes.

The participation of food-related companies contributes to increasing the visibility of the Armenian HoReCa sector, providing restaurants and food service companies with the opportunity to showcase their offerings to a new audience.

=== Wine Culture Awareness Zone ===
By providing visitors with a rich and diverse entertainment experience, the festival also aims to spread the culture and history of Armenian wine. To this end, during the festival, masterclasses are held with the participation of local and international sommeliers, wine pairing workshops, as well as the 'YereWine' Audioperformance.

This is a unique experience created with advanced 3D audio technology.Through headphones, listeners hear the romantic story of Daniel and Miriam, during which Daniel, together with sommelier Miriam, embarks on a journey of wine discovery. For the listeners, this entire experience is accompanied by tastings of red and white wines and music, creating a unique atmosphere to reinforce the knowledge gained on the spot.

=== Music zone ===
The entire festival is accompanied by live music, creating a festive, positive, and energetic atmosphere. This zone serves as a unique platform where both emerging musicians and bands, as well as well-known and beloved performers, showcase their music. On the two stages of the festival, performances of various genres can be heard, ranging from jazz and folk to modern electronic and pop music. The musical segment of the event is diverse and accessible to a wide range of audiences.

Each year, the festival provides an opportunity for several emerging artists to perform in front of a large audience and gain widespread recognition. Alongside these up-and-coming artists, the festival also features performances by well-known performers such as Forsh, Lav Eli Band, Astghik Safaryan, the Nemra band, YereOne Project, Arsen Grigoryan, and many others. The event also hosts popular groups and artists from other countries, such as the Czech Blue Apple band, the American Black Alley band, and the Sihasin band representing Navajo culture.

== Festival branding ==
The symbol of the millennia-long history of winemaking, the karas (wine jug), has been a key part of the festival's branding. The festival's main logo depicts the silhouette of a clay karas dating back to the 10th-9th century BC, discovered during archaeological excavations in the area of Dvin. The choice of this emblem has deep cultural significance, emphasizing Armenia's role as one of the world's oldest winemaking centers.

The wave-like element on the karas in the logo symbolizes the liquid—wine—while the horizontal line represents the level of the ground, where the karas was buried halfway. The wave-like element also symbolizes the earth and the air. The color scheme further reflects the unique characteristics of the karas' placement: the dark wine color at the bottom represents the buried portion of the karas, while the warm tones at the top symbolize the sun, under which they were dried. You can see the original karas, which serves as the foundation of the logo, by visiting the National Museum of Armenian History.

To develop the festival's branding, up to 20 karas were studied, all of which were excavated from various historical sites in Armenia, including Karmir Blur, Teghut, Erebuni, and Metsamor. The decorative patterns on the karas are depicted in a sketch-like manner, emphasizing the handcrafted nature of both the karas and the designs.

== Participants ==
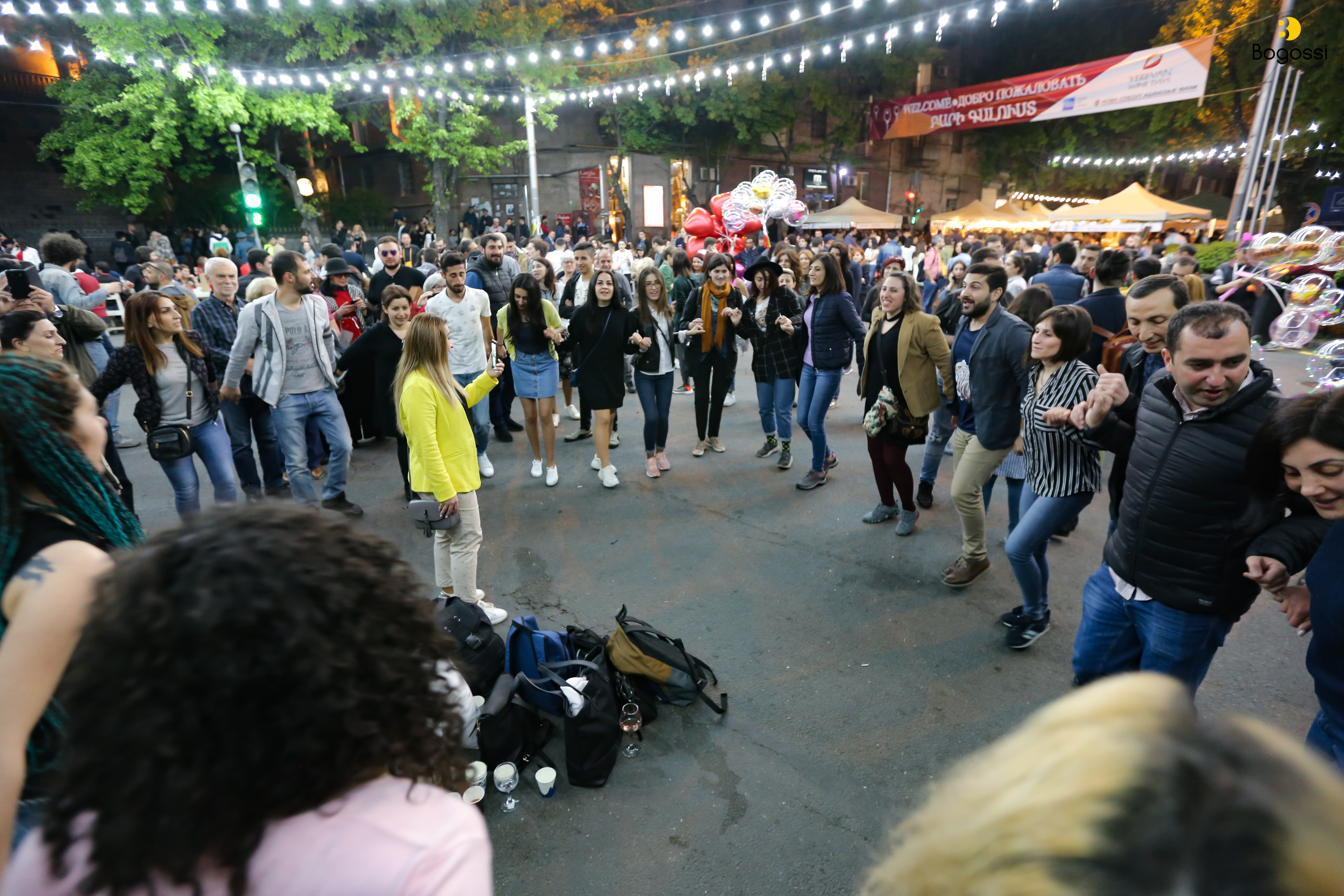
Roundelay on Saryan Street on Yerevan Wine Days

The event involves a great number of Armenian and Artsakh winemakers, as well as restaurants and cafes featuring dishes and sweets specific to Armenian, Japanese, Mexican, Italian, French cuisines.

In three years (2017–2019) there have been 79 wine-presenting participants. The following museums were presented in Yerevan Wine Days 2019:

1. Hovhannes Toumanian museum
2. Ara Sargsyan and Hakob Kojoyan Museum
3. Martiros Sarian House-Museum

The event also hosts Armenian musicians, small bands and artists to join the musical part which is a set of various performances on large and several small stages situated in different parts of the streets.

== Visitors ==
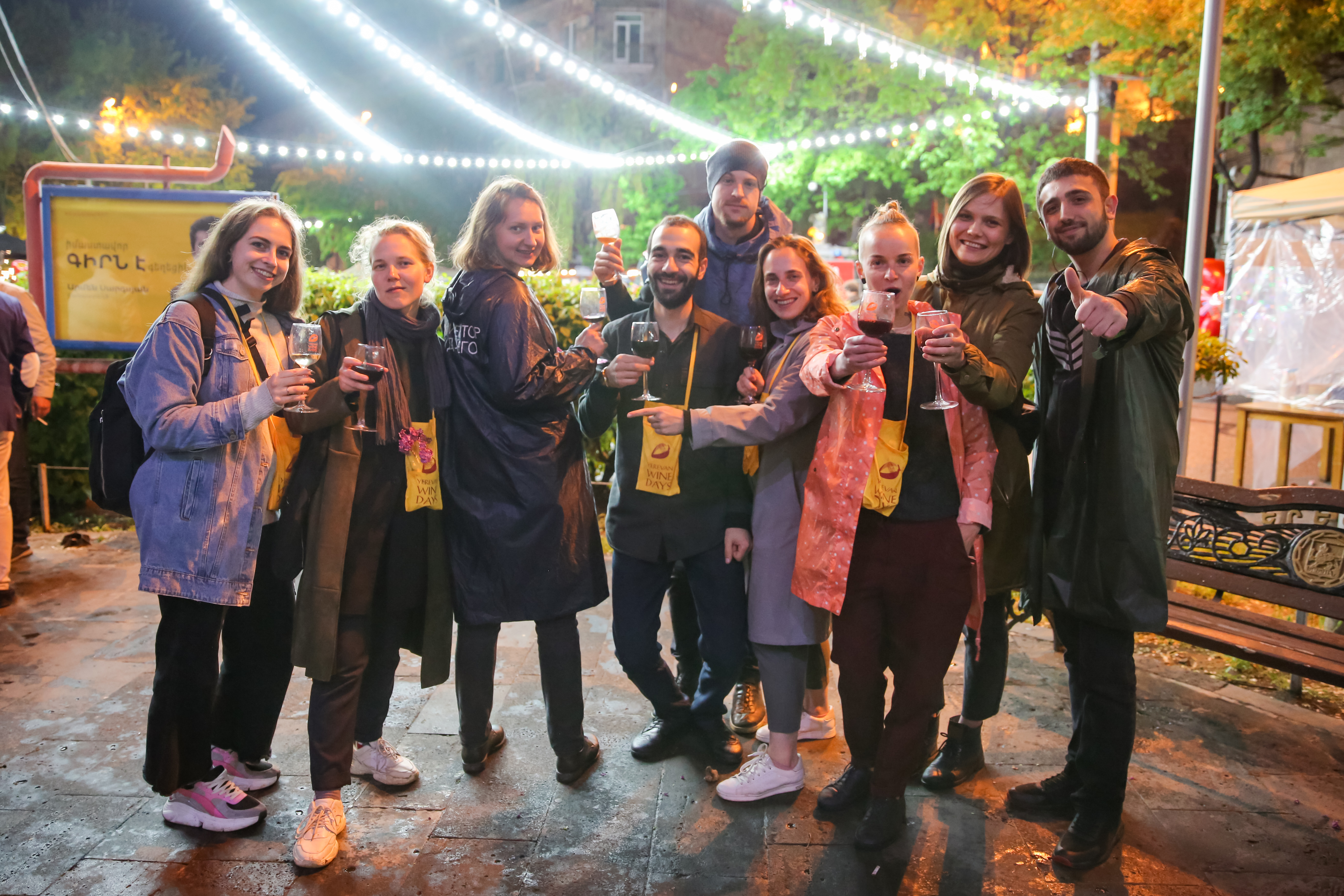
The visitors gathered on YereWineDays to drink wine and spend good time together.

Yerevan Wine Days is a major tourism event in Armenia, annually welcoming thousands of tourists from around the world and positioning Armenia as one of the leading wine destinations on the global tourism map. The geographic diversity of visitors is vast—ranging from neighboring countries in the region to wine enthusiasts from Europe, Asia, the Americas, and even Australia. Yerevan Wine Days has become one of the rare events capable of bringing together a multicultural and multinational audience, creating a unique atmosphere of international connection and cultural exchange.

Visitors have come from countries such as:

Canada, USA, Colombia, Mexico, Australia, Belgium, Germany, Poland, France, Czech Republic, Hungary, Bulgaria, Scotland, Norway, Italy, Austria, Denmark, Russia, Ukraine, Belarus, Georgia, the Philippines, Switzerland, Singapore, China.

Yerevan Wine Days had over 25,000 visitors in 2017, about 30,000 in 2018, and more than 30,000 in 2019. These numbers caught the attention of Forbes’ journalist Tom Mullen, who mentioned Yerevan Wine Days in his article "Yerevan City In Armenia Is A Jewel For Travel, Food And Wine":

"Yerevan Wine Days—a two-day, free festival focused on showcasing national food and some 200 Armenian wines. The event includes music and traditional dances."

By expanding the number of participating winemakers and partners, the event also tripled the number of festival visitors. In 2024, the event welcomed over 120,000 attendees over the course of three days.

== The Chronology of the Event ==
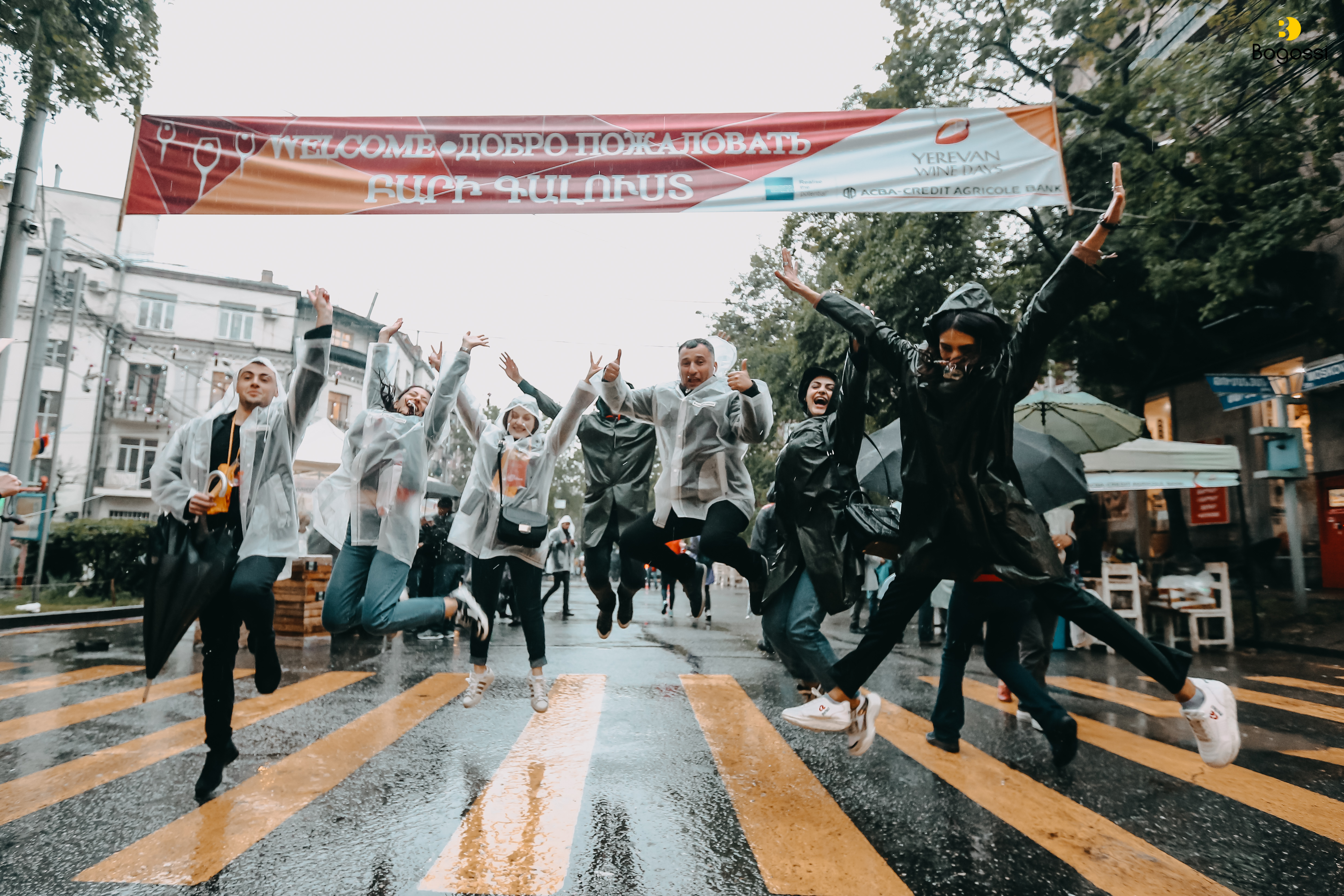
Rain Never Disturbs Yerevan Wine Days

Yerevan Wine Days has been held since 2017, and starting from 2021, it takes place annually on the first Friday, Saturday, and Sunday of June.

- 2025 - June 6–8, Saryan, Moskovyan and Tumanyan streets.
- 2024 - June 7–9, Saryan, Moskovyan and Tumanyan streets.
- 2023 - June 2–4, Saryan, Moskovyan and Tumanyan streets.
- 2022 - June 3–5, Saryan, Moskovyan and Tumanyan streets, Yerevan
- 2021 - June 4–5, Saryan, Moskovyan and Tumanyan streets, Yerevan
- 2020 - May 3, Online Yerevan Wine Days 2020
- 2019 - May 3–4, Saryan and Moskovyan streets, Yerevan In 2019 it was dedicated to 150th anniversary of the national poet of Armenia Hovhannes Tumanyan.
- 2018 - May 11–12, Saryan street, Yerevan In 2018 Yerevan Wine Days was dedicated to the 2800th anniversary of Erebuni-Yerevan
- 2017 - May 5–6, Saryan street, Yerevan

Because of the COVID-19 pandemic Yerevan Wine Days 2020, which was to be held on May 1–2, has been postponed until 2021.

== Symbols ==
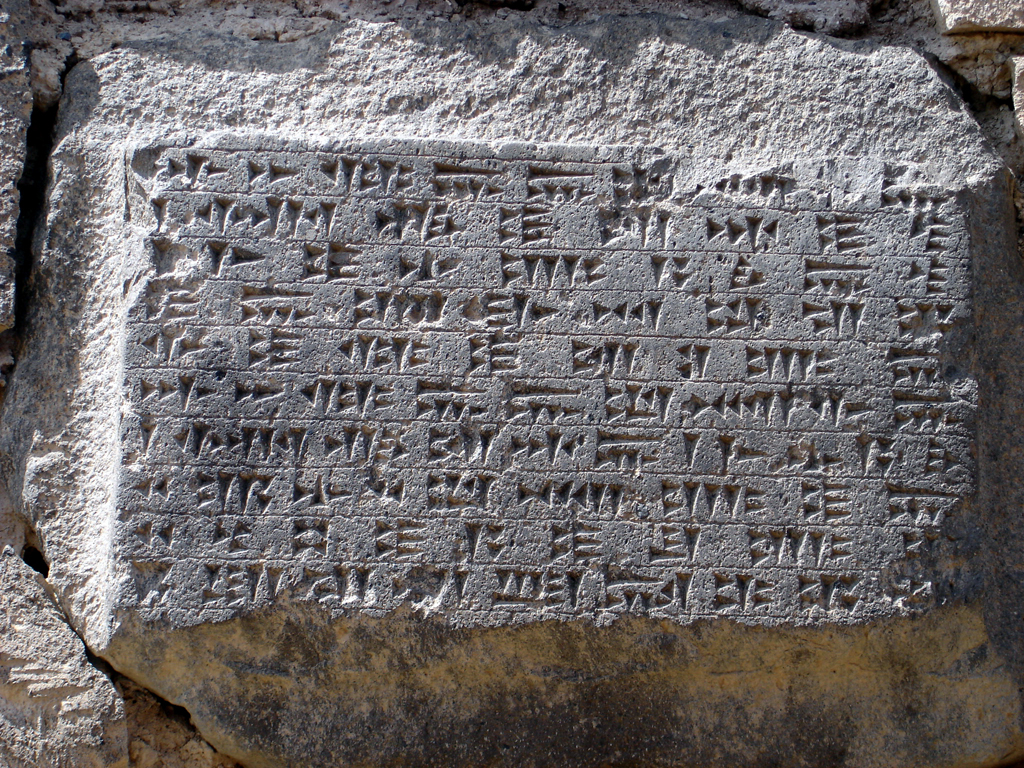
The "birth certificate" of Yerevan at the Erebuni Fortress—a cuneiform inscription left by King Argishti I of Urartu on a basalt stone slab about the foundation of the city in 782 BC

The emblem of the Yerevan Wine Days event is a traditional Armenian wine jar (karas, Armenian: կարաս) that depicts a cuneiform inscription left by King Argishti I of Urartu. A cuneiform inscription is archaeological evidence which indicates that the Urartian military fortress of Erebuni (Էրեբունի) was founded in 782 BC by the orders of King Argishti I at the site of modern-day Yerevan.
