= Jancis Robinson =

British journalist

Jancis Robinson OBE ComMA MW
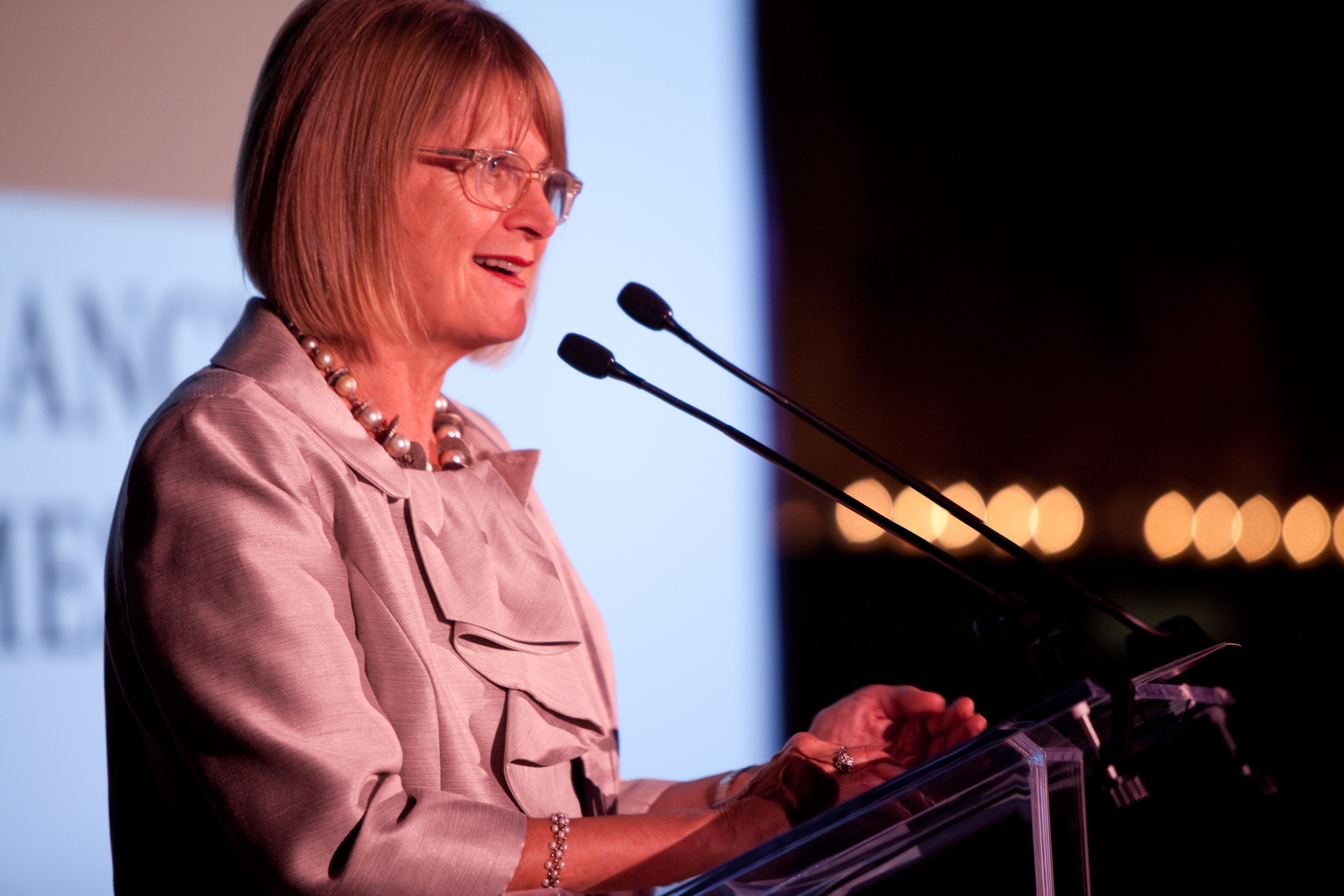
- Jancis Robinson at a Financial Times Charity Wine Dinner in 2010.
- Born: Jancis Mary Robinson; 22 April 1950 (age 76); Carlisle, England
- Occupation: Wine critic
- Writing career
- Subject: Wine
- Notable awards: Order of the British Empire
- Website: www.jancisrobinson.com

Jancis Mary Robinson OBE, ComMA, MW (born 22 April 1950) is a British wine critic, journalist and wine writer. She currently writes a weekly column for the Financial Times, and writes for her website JancisRobinson.com, updated daily. She provided advice for the wine cellar of Queen Elizabeth II.

== Early life and education ==
Robinson was born in Carlisle, Cumberland. She attended the village primary school in Kirkandrews-on-Eden followed by Carlisle and County High School for Girls. She studied mathematics and philosophy at St Anne's College, University of Oxford, and worked in marketing for Thomson Holidays.

== Career ==
Robinson started her wine writing career on 1 December 1975 when she became assistant editor for the trade magazine Wine & Spirit. In 1984, she became the first person outside the wine trade to become a Master of Wine. From 1995 until she resigned in 2010 she served as British Airways' wine consultant, and supervised the BA Concorde cellar luxury selection.

As a wine writer, she has become one of the world's leading writers of educational and encyclopedic material on wine and was described by Decanter as "the most respected wine critic and journalist in the world". The Oxford Companion to Wine, edited by Robinson, is widely considered to be the most comprehensive wine encyclopedia in the world. The first edition was published in 1994, and took five years to write after she was signed on as editor in 1988. In addition, The World Atlas of Wine by Hugh Johnson and Robinson is one of the world's leading wine atlases.

In 1995, Robinson appeared in a 10-episode wine course on BBC 2 television. This series was later reissued on DVD. A book titled Jancis Robinson's Wine Course was written to accompany the series and has gone through several editions. In 2015 she launched an online wine course, "Mastering Wine – Shortcuts to Success" on udemy. In 2022 she launched "An Understanding of Wine", an exclusive online course for BBC Maestro.

She has an honorary doctorate from the Open University, and was made an OBE in 2003, among numerous other awards for her writing. Her accolades include multiple Glenfiddich Awards and André Simon Memorial Awards, and a selection as the Decanter "1999 Woman of the Year". In 2016, she was made an Officier de l'Ordre du Mérite Agricole, was given the German VDP association's highest honour and won her fourth James Beard Award in the US.

Following a difference of opinion with Robert Parker over the 2003 vintage of Château Pavie, the following media coverage frequently described a "war of words" between the two critics. In 2008, Robinson contested that they had an antagonistic relationship.

In 2012, Allen Lane (Penguin) in the UK and Ecco in the US published a 1,200-page book called Wine Grapes co-authored by Robinson with Julia Harding MW and Jose Vouillamoz. The book provides comprehensive details on 1,368 vine varieties and won six major wine book awards.

In 2018, Robinson appeared in the documentary SOMM 3.

In 2021, Recurrent Ventures acquired Jancis Robinson’s website, JancisRobinson.com, for an undisclosed sum. She continues to run the editorial team and contribute her own writing.

== Personal life ==
Robinson is married to the food writer Nicholas Lander, author of The Art of the Restaurateur; they have three children.

== Honours ==
- Officer of the Order of the British Empire, United Kingdom (2003)
- Officer of the Order of Agricultural Merit, France (2010)
- Commander of the Order of Entrepreneurial Merit (Category of Agricultural Merit), Portugal (2011)

== Bibliography ==
- Robinson, Jancis (1979). The wine book : a straightforward guide to better buying and drinking for less money. A & C Black. ISBN 0-71362-011-0.
- Robinson, Jancis (1982). The Great Wine Book. Sidgwick & Jackson. ISBN 978-0-28398-766-3.
- Robinson, Jancis (1983). Masterglass : a practical course in tasting wine. Pan Original. ISBN 978-0-33028-097-6.
- Robinson, Jancis (1984). How to choose and enjoy wine. Orbis. ISBN 978-0-85613-743-3.
- Loftus, Simon; Robinson, Jancis (1985). Anatomy of the wine trade : Abe's sardines and other stories. Harper & Row. ISBN 978-0-06015-785-2.
- Belfrage, Nicolas; Robinson, Jancis (1985). Life beyond Lambrusco : understanding Italian fine wine. Sidgwick & Jackson. ISBN 978-0-28399-271-1.
- Robinson, Jancis (1986). Vines, Grapes and Wines. Mitchell Beazley. ISBN 978-1-85732-999-5.
- Robinson, Jancis (1997). Confessions of a Wine Lover (UK); Tasting Pleasure (U.S.). Penguin/Viking. ISBN 978-0-14-023529-6.
- Robinson, Jancis (2003). Jancis Robinson's Wine Course (2nd ed.). Abbeville Press Publishers. ISBN 978-0-7892-0791-3.
- Robinson, Jancis (2008). How to Taste Wine (UK); How to Taste (U.S.). Conran Octopus/Simon & Schuster. ISBN 978-1-84091-520-4.
- Robinson, Jancis; Harding, Julia; Vouillamoz, José (2012). Wine Grapes. Allen Lane. ISBN 978-1-84614-446-2.
- Johnson, Hugh; Robinson, Jancis (2013). The World Atlas of Wine (7th ed.). Mitchell Beazley. ISBN 978-1-84533-301-0.
- Robinson, Jancis; Murphy, Linda (2013). American Wine. University of California Press. ISBN 978-1-84533-528-1.
- Robinson, Jancis, ed. (2015). The Oxford Companion to Wine (4th ed.). Oxford University Press. ISBN 978-0-19-870538-3.
- Robinson, Jancis (2016). The 24-Hour Wine Expert. Penguin. ISBN 978-0-141-98181-9.

== See also ==
- List of wine personalities
