= Queens' College Chapel Choir, Cambridge =

Queens' College Chapel Choir, Cambridge is the choir of Queens' College, Cambridge, England. It is a mixed collegiate Chapel Choir composed both of Choral Scholars and volunteers from across Cambridge University. Between 2011 and 2015 the choir was run by Director of Music, Silas Wollston, and two undergraduate organ scholars. Between 2015 and 2022 most services were directed by British conductor Ralph Allwood. Nicholas Morris joined the college as Director of Music in September 2022.

== About the choir ==
Until October 2008, the choir was run by the organ scholars, who were responsible for music in Chapel and the recruiting, training and conducting of the Choir. Since then, the Director of Music has been responsible for conducting the chapel choir, and, in turn, tutoring and mentoring the organ scholars. Additionally the choir employs two singing teachers to aid in the training of the choral scholars and volunteers.

The Choir meets three times per week during full term, singing choral evensongs on Wednesday and Sunday evenings, and compline on a Friday. The choir also performs concerts, and sings at special services, such as Eucharists on feast days, the college's Commemoration of Benefactors, weddings and memorial services. The Choir tours regularly, singing for services around the country in cathedrals such as Westminster Abbey (2017), Canterbury Cathedral (2008), Southwell Minster and Truro Cathedral (2005). The choir also travels on international tours further afield on an annual basis. The Choir has recorded with three labels: Guild Music, Past Times, and Orchid Classics. The Choir's most recent recordings have been with Orchid Classics.

The choir appoints up to four choral scholars a year; scholarships are usually awarded to undergraduate applicants of the college who partake in the university choral trials which take place in September. Choral volunteers are appointed by audition at the start of the academic year and come from a large range of the university's colleges.

== Discography ==
- For the Wings of a Dove Orchid Classics (2015)
- And Comes The Day: Carols and Antiphons for Advent Orchid Classics (2012)
- Love and Honour Guild Music (2005)
- Songs of Heaven and Earth Guild Music (2003)
- Flight of Song Guild Music (2001)
- Christmas from Cambridge Past Times (1999)
- Wedding Hymns Guild Music (1999)
- Evening Watch Guild Music (1999)
- Vox Dicentis Mirabilis (1995)
- The Queen's Service Mirabilis (1994)

== Tours ==
- December 2007 – Hong Kong
- December 2008 – East Coast US
- March 2009 – Angers, France
- March 2010 – Sicily
- December 2010 – West and South Germany
- April 2011 – Exeter Cathedral
- December 2011 – Brussels and Ghent
- August 2012 – North Germany
- December 2012 – Paris
- March 2013 – Bury St. Edmunds
- July 2013 – Switzerland
- January 2014 – Hong Kong
- July 2015 – Budapest
- July 2016 – North France: Loire Valley and Paris
- April 2017 – East Coast US
- July 2018 – Greece: Athens and Thessaloniki
- July 2019 – France: Paris and Angers

== See also ==
- Queens' College, Cambridge
- Suzi Digby
- Ralph Allwood

== Bibliography ==
1. "Guild Music". Guild Music.
2. "Queens' College Chapel Choir". Queens' College Chapel Choir. Archived from the original on 23 June 2013.
