= The Movement (theatre company) =

The Movement is a theatre company formed at the University of Cambridge in Cambridge, England, in 2009. It has moved from amateur to professional productions over the last two years.

== Company history ==
Originally performing to critical acclaim within the university's theatre scene, it has evolved into a fully functioning professional company. It has toured plays nationally and internationally, visited the Edinburgh Fringe and been favourably compared to the Royal Shakespeare Company by The Stage. The most recent national tour, Shakespeare's The Tempest, was described by the British Theatre Guide as "uniformly excellent...this gifted company deserve West End exposure...a team of most auspicious future theatre stars". In August 2011, the company took the Earl of Rochester's Farce of Sodom to the Edinburgh Fringe, in keeping with their focus on verse drama.

The company has now effectively disbanded due to financial difficulties.
