= Cambridge University Wireless Society =

The Cambridge University Wireless Society (CUWS) is the amateur radio club of the University of Cambridge, England.

CUWS is one of the oldest still active radio clubs in the United Kingdom. It was founded on 13 October 1920 and its call sign has since 1932 always been G6UW. The society operates a radio shack outside Cambridge and frequently enters amateur radio contests such as CQWW in both the single-sideband modulation (SSB) and continuous wave (CW) category. The society also holds the call sign M4A for use in certain contests.

Some notable ex-members are Maurice Wilkes and Ernest Rutherford.

== DXpeditions ==
The Cambridge University Wireless Society regularly organise DX-peditions. Previous trips have included the following locations, among others:

- Faroe Islands
- Iceland
- Isle of Man
- Jersey
- Saint Pierre and Miquelon
- Switzerland
- Tristan da Cunha
